= Julian Potter =

American banker and diplomat (1858-1913)

- Born: August 10, 1858; New Rochelle, New York, U.S.
- Died: August 14, 1913 (aged 55); Greenwich, Connecticut, U.S.
- Education: Harvard College; Magdalene College, Cambridge
- Spouse: Alice Berenice Pixley (m. 1894)
- Parent(s): Edward Tuckerman Potter; Julia Blatchford Potter
- Relatives: Alonzo Potter (grandfather); Howard Potter (uncle); Robert Potter (uncle); Clarkson Potter (uncle); Henry Potter (uncle); William Potter (uncle); Samuel Blatchford (uncle); Howard Nott Potter (cousin)

Julian Potter (August 10, 1858 – August 14, 1913) was an American banker and diplomat who was prominent in New York society during the Gilded Age.

== Early life ==
Potter was born in New Rochelle, New York on August 10, 1858. He was the son of Edward Tuckerman Potter and Julia Maria (née Blatchford) Potter (1834–1922). Among his siblings was Edward Clarkson Potter (husband of Emily Blanche Havemeyer, daughter of Theodore Havemeyer), Richard Milford Blatchford Potter, Robert Francis Potter, Ethelinda Potter, Louisa (née Potter) Delano (wife of William Adams Delano); and Julia Selden (née Potter) McIlvaine.

His maternal grandparents were U.S. Minister to the State of the Church Richard Milford Blatchford and Julian Ann (née Mumford) Blatchford. His uncle was Samuel Blatchford, an Associate Justice of the Supreme Court of the United States. His paternal grandparents were Sarah (née Nott) Potter (daughter of Eliphalet Nott, the longest serving college president in the United States) and Alonzo Potter, the Episcopalian Bishop of Pennsylvania. Among his many prominent Potter relatives were uncles Howard Potter, a New York City banker; Robert Brown Potter, a General in the American Civil War; Democratic U.S. Representative Clarkson Nott Potter; Henry Codman Potter, the bishop of the Episcopal Diocese of New York; Eliphalet Nott Potter, who served as President of Union College and Hobart College; and William Appleton Potter, also an architect who designed the Church of the Presidents in Elberon, New Jersey.

Potter fitted for college at St. Paul's School in Concord, New Hampshire, and then attended Harvard College, studying architecture, from October 1877 until March 1878. Due to his health, he left Harvard and thereafter began attending Magdalene College, Cambridge, graduating with a B.A. degree in 1882 and M.A. degree in 1885.

== Career ==
After graduating from Cambridge, Potter began his career with the firm of Breese and Smith, stockbrokers, in 1890.

In October 1900, he was commissioned U.S. Consul at Nassau, Bahamas, where he served for nine years. After the Bahamas, he was transferred to a port in France, but resigned due to ill health, and returned to America, where he died within a year.

=== Society life ===
In 1892, Potter was included in Ward McAllister's "Four Hundred", purported to be an index of New York's best families, published in The New York Times. Conveniently, 400 was the number of people that could fit into Mrs. Astor's ballroom. Potter was a member of the Knickerbocker Club and the Lambs Club.

== Personal life ==
On September 14, 1894, Potter was married to actress Alice Berenice Pixley, the sister of fellow actress Annie Pixley. Alice acted in several well known plays, including Trilby in 1895 and Shore Acres in 1893 by James A. Herne. In 1903, while he was in Newport, his wife was staying at a boarding house at 63 West 36th Street where she suffered acute morphine poisoning forcing her to be taken to Bellevue Hospital for treatment. Together, they were the parents of one child: Julia Anne Dorothea Potter (born 1905).

Potter died in a sanitarium in Greenwich, Connecticut on August 14, 1913.
