= Howard Nott Potter =

American architect

- Born: May 6, 1859; New York City, New York, U.S.
- Died: July 31, 1937 (aged 78); Westhampton Beach, New York, U.S.
- Education: Union College; Columbia College
- Occupation: Architect
- Spouse: Ethel Potter (m. 1884)
- Parent(s): Clarkson Nott Potter; Virginia Mitchell Potter
- Relatives: Howard Potter (uncle); Robert B. Potter (uncle); Edward T. Potter (uncle); Henry C. Potter (uncle); William A. Potter (uncle); Alonzo Potter (grandfather)

Howard Nott Potter (May 6, 1859 – July 31, 1937), was an American architect known for his design of churches who was prominent in New York society during the Gilded Age.

== Early life ==
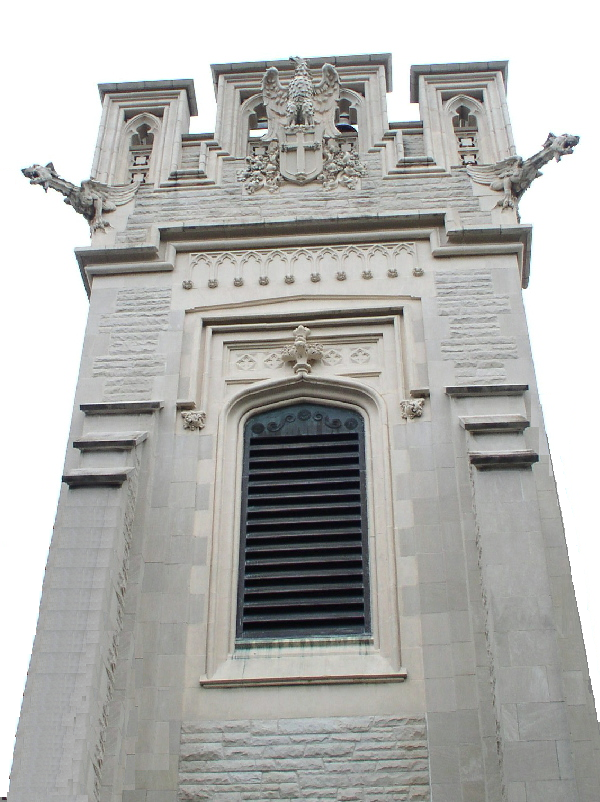
Tower of St. John's Cathedral.

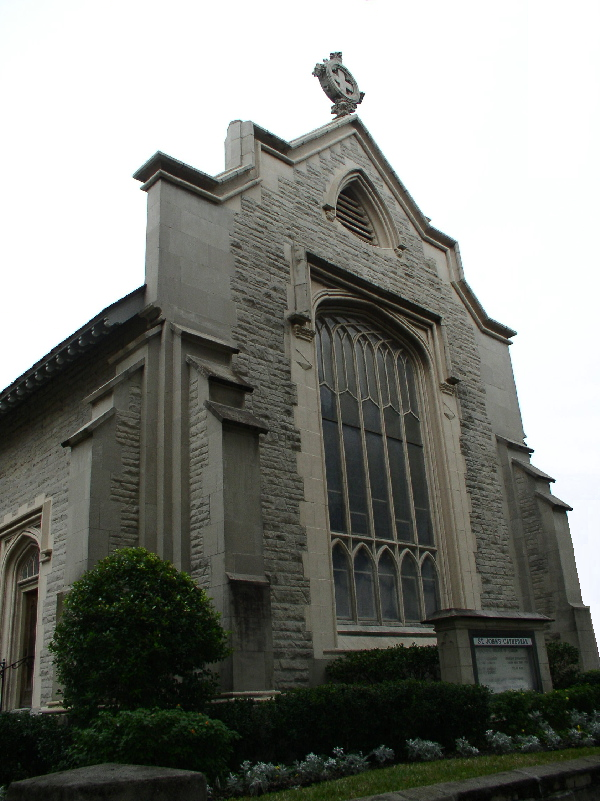
Front of St. John's Cathedral.

Potter was born in New York City on May 6, 1859. He was the son of Virginia (née Mitchell) Potter (1827–1890) and Democratic U.S. Representative Clarkson Nott Potter (1825–1882). Among his siblings was Maria Louisa Potter, who married Joseph Leslie Cotton of Boston; Virginia Potter, who did not marry, Eleanor Potter, and Clarkson Alonzo Potter. Upon his father's death in 1882, he shared in his estate valued in excess of $1,000,000.

His paternal grandparents were Sarah (née Nott) Potter (daughter of Eliphalet Nott, the longest serving college president in the United States) and Alonzo Potter, the Episcopalian Bishop of Pennsylvania. His maternal grandparents were Matthew and Louisa (née Kidd) Mitchell of Philadelphia. Among his many prominent relatives were uncles Howard Potter, a New York City banker, Robert Brown Potter, a General in the American Civil War, Edward Tuckerman Potter, an architect, Henry Codman Potter, the bishop of the Episcopal Diocese of New York, Eliphalet Nott Potter, who served as President of Union College and Hobart College, and William Appleton Potter, also an architect who designed the Church of the Presidents in Elberon, New Jersey.

Potter was educated in private schools in New York, then "fitted for college" under Dean Oliver. He entered Union College and graduated in 1881 with an A.B. degree. After Union, he went abroad for several years until he returned in 1890 to attend Columbia College to study architecture. He returned to Europe to finish his education.

== Career ==
After completing his architectural education in Europe, Potter returned to New York and began his career by partnering with Grenville Snelling to form the architecture firm of Snelling & Potter. In his practice, he was known for designing many private homes in the city and country, including the Bencoe Residence in White Plains, New York. He also designed several churches, including the St. John's Cathedral in Jacksonville, Florida and the enlargement of The Priory in Pelham, New York.

Potter also wrote about architecture, including Stable Planning, published in The Architectural Review in September 1902. He served on the New York Society of Architects as the vice-chair of the Decoration committee in 1922.

=== Society life ===
In 1892, Potter and his wife were included in Ward McAllister's "Four Hundred", purported to be an index of New York's best families, published in The New York Times. Conveniently, 400 was the number of people that could fit into Mrs. Astor's ballroom.

Potter was a member of the Kappa Alpha Society, the Racquet Club, the Westchester Country Club, and the City Club of New York.

== Personal life ==
On May 9, 1884, Potter was married to Ethelinda "Ethel" Potter (1860–1949). Ethel, his first cousin, was the daughter of his paternal uncle, and fellow architect, Edward Tuckerman Potter, who designed the Nott Memorial at Union College. Together, they were the parents of:

- Howard Clarkson Potter (1894–1894), who died in infancy.
- John Howard Nott Potter (1896–1961), who married Margaretta Wood, daughter of Rear Adm. Spencer Shepard Wood. He was president of Brett, Wyckoff, Potter, Hamilton Inc., real estate brokers in New York.
- Ethel Julia Howard Potter (1898–1971), who married artist Allyn Cox (1896–1982), son of artists Kenyon Cox and Louise King Cox, in 1927.

Potter inherited fifty percent of his father's country house, known as "Nutwood", in New Rochelle, overlooking the Long Island Sound. They also had a home in Harrison, New York known as "Allendale Farm".

Potter died at his home, "The Sea Horse" in Westhampton Beach, on July 31, 1937. His widow died in Mendham, New Jersey in January 1949.
