= Johann Ludwig Tellkampf =

German politician (1808–1876)

Johann Ludwig Tellkampf (28 January 1808 – 15 February 1876) was a German scholar and politician who taught in Germany and the United States.

== Biography ==
Tellkampf was born 28 January 1808 in Bückeburg in the Principality of Schaumburg-Lippe. He came to the United States in 1838, engaged in teaching, and in 1843–47 was professor of the German language and literature in Columbia. He then returned to Germany as professor in Breslau. In 1848 he was elected to the Frankfurt parliament, in 1849 to the Prussian Chamber of Deputies, in 1855 to the Herrenhaus, and in 1871 to the first German Reichstag. He died 15 February 1876 in Breslau.

== Works ==
- Political Economy, with Alonzo Potter (New York, 1840)
- Ueber die Besserungsgefängnisse in Nord-Amerika und England (On reformatories in North America and England, 1844)
- Essays on Law Reform and Commercial Policy, with his brother Theodore (London, 1859)
- Ueber Arbeiterverhältnisse und Erwerbsgenossenschaften in England und Nord-Amerika (1870)
- Selbstverwaltung und Reforme der Gemeinde und Kreisordnungen in Preussen, und Self-Government in England und Nord-Amerika (Self-government and reform of community and district regulations in Prussia, and self-government in England and North America, 1872)
