= Clarkson N. Potter =

Clarkson N. Potter may refer to:

- Clarkson Nott Potter (1825–1882), American civil engineer, lawyer, and politician
- Clarkson N. Potter, an American publishing house, now an imprint of the Crown Publishing Group
