= Bishop Potter =

Bishop Potter may refer to:

- Bishop Henry Codman Potter (1835–1908) of the Episcopal Church in the Diocese of New York
- Bishop Alonzo Potter (1800–1865) of the Episcopal Church in the Diocese of Pennsylvania
- Bishop Horatio Potter (1802–1887) of the Episcopal Church in the Diocese of New York
