= All Saints Memorial Church (Federal Hill, Providence, Rhode Island) =

Historic church in Rhode Island, United States

- U.S. National Register of Historic Places
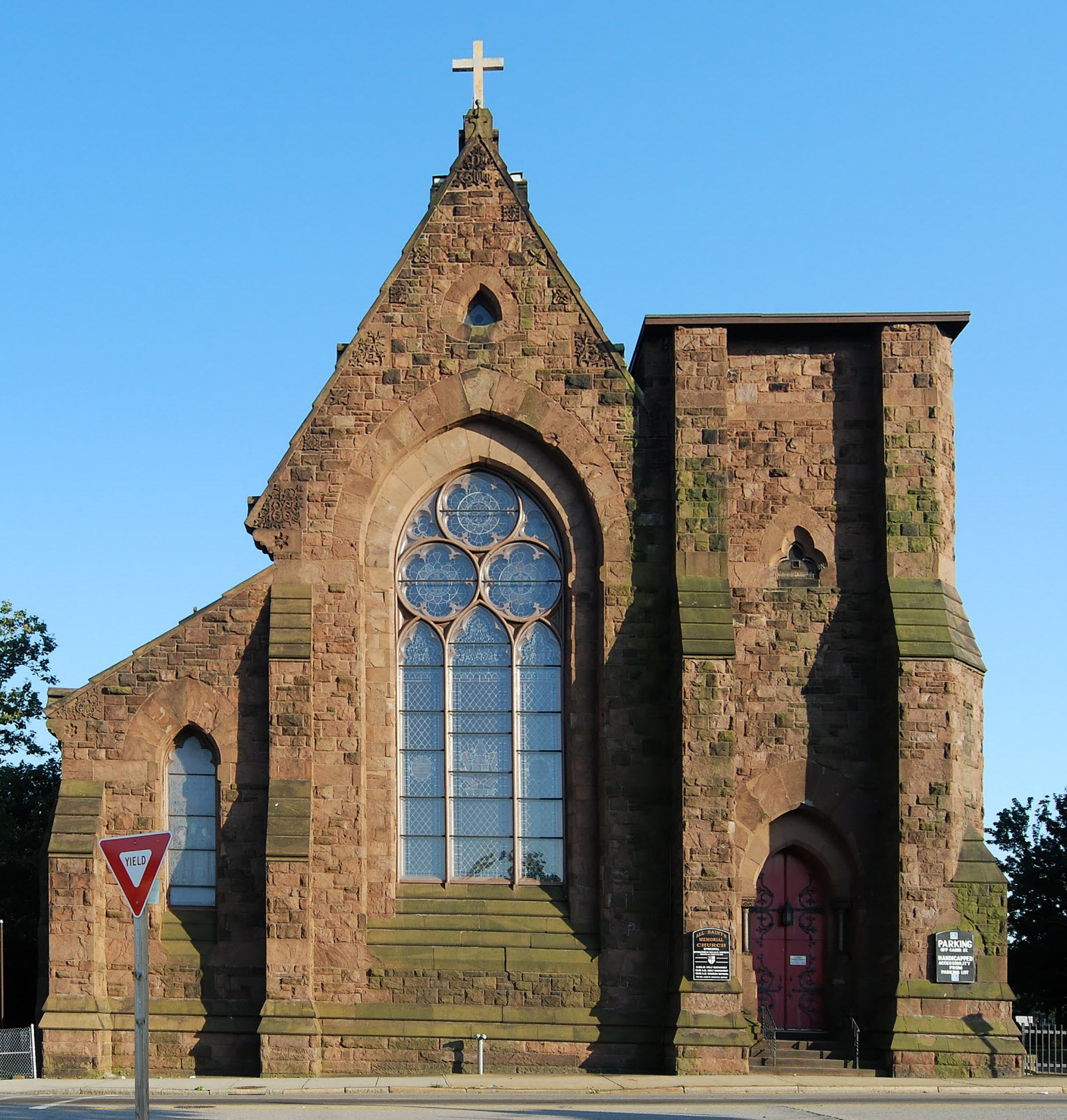

- Location within Rhode Island Location within the United States
- Location: 674 Westminster Street; Providence, Rhode Island 02909
- Coordinates: 41°49′7″N 71°25′8″W
- Area: 1 acre (0.40 ha)
- Built: 1872
- Architect: Edward Tuckerman Potter; Gorham Henshaw
- Architectural style: Gothic, Tudor Revival
- MPS: Elmwood MRA
- NRHP reference No.: 80000083
- Added to NRHP: January 7, 1980

All Saints Memorial Church is a historic Episcopal church at 674 Westminster Street in Federal Hill, Providence, Rhode Island. The congregation is part of the Episcopal Diocese of Rhode Island.

In 2020, the church reported 141 members; in 2023, it reported 103 members. No membership statistics were reported in 2024 national parochial reports. Plate and pledge financial support reported by the church in 2024 was $212,945. Average Sunday Attendance (ASA) reported in 2019 was 45 persons. This was a relative decrease from ASA of 59 persons reported in 2015.

== Building ==
The current church building, a large brownstone structure with a flat-topped tower, was designed by architect Edward Tuckerman Potter in a Gothic, Tudor Revival style, and built from 1869 to 1872. It is the largest Episcopal church building in the state, and its only known Potter-designed church. The accompanying (now-demolished) parish house is a Tudor Revival structure designed by Gorham Henshaw and built in 1909. The church building was added to the National Register of Historic Places in 1980.

== See also ==
- National Register of Historic Places listings in Providence, Rhode Island
