= Downtown Main Street Historic District (East Hartford, Connecticut) =

Historic district in Connecticut, United States

- U.S. National Register of Historic Places
- U.S. Historic district
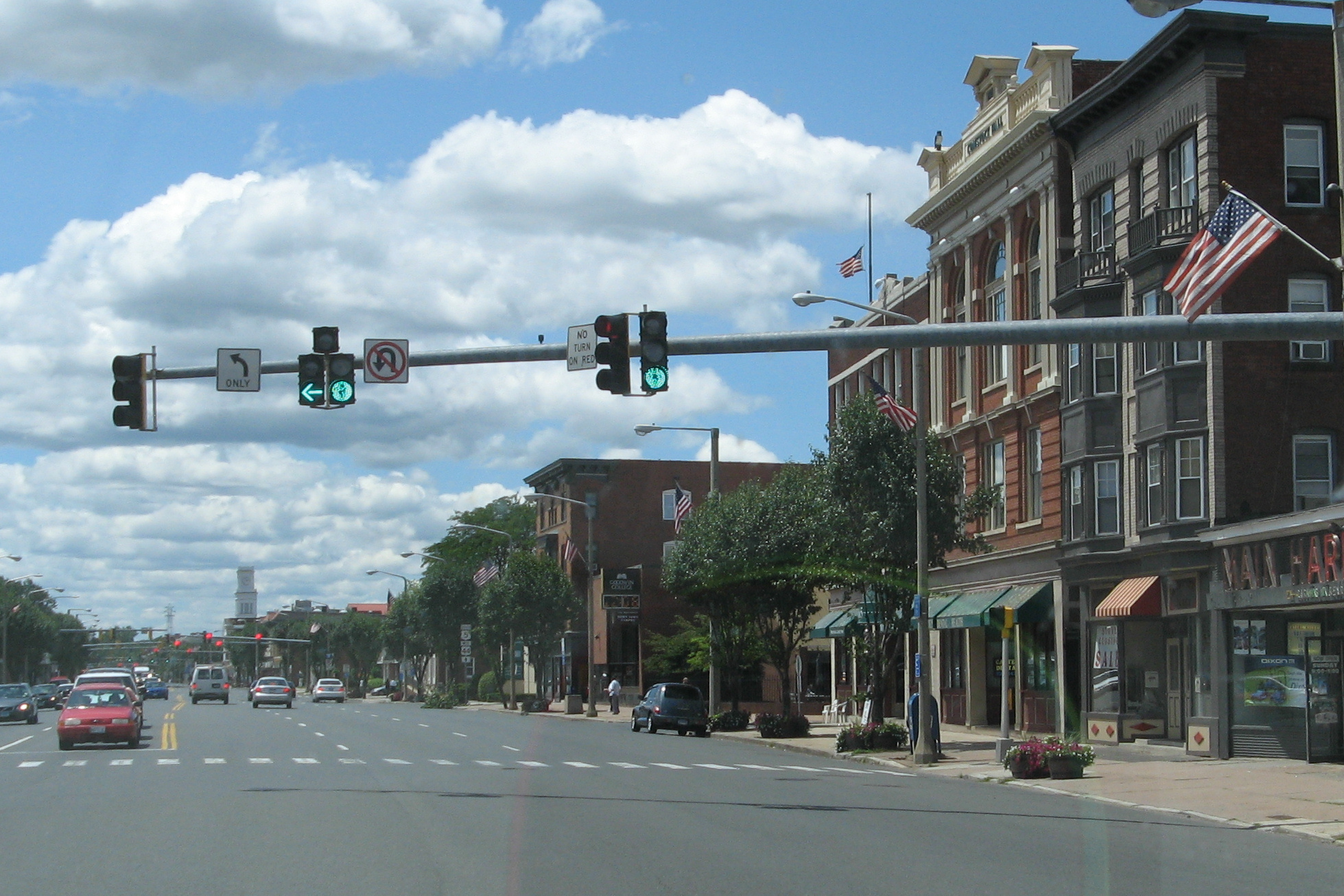

- Location within Connecticut Location within the United States
- Location: Roughly bounded by Main Street, Governor Street, Chapman Place, and Burnside Avenue, East Hartford, Connecticut
- Coordinates: 41°46′20″N 72°38′31″W
- Area: 25 acres (10 ha)
- Architect: Potter, Edward T.
- Architectural style: Gothic, Classical Revival, Colonial Revival
- MPS: East Hartford MPS
- NRHP reference No.: 96001464
- Added to NRHP: December 20, 1996

The Downtown Main Street Historic District encompasses a well-preserved historical section of downtown East Hartford, Connecticut, United States. It extends along Main Street from between Burnside Avenue and Governor Street, and along Chapman Street to Chapman Place. Developed between about 1890 and 1945, its architecture encapsulates the town's transition from a main agrarian community to a modern suburb. The district was listed on the National Register of Historic Places in 1996.

== Description and history ==
The town of East Hartford was settled as part of Hartford in the 17th century, primarily as an agricultural outpost, and was separately incorporated in 1783. Main Street was laid out in the 1670s, and became a major roadway between Hartford and communities to the east. Its economy remained agricultural for many decades, transitioning from a subsistence farming economy to one based on tobacco farming in the late 19th century. The economy benefited to some extent from industry powered by the waters of the Hockanum River, which roughly bisects the town. The town's transition away from agriculture was largely prompted by the development of a streetcar railway providing ready access to Hartford, and the development of a major railroad depot, both events dating to about 1890. Growth was significantly spurred by completion of the Bulkeley Bridge across the Connecticut River.

The historic section of the downtown contains surviving architecture from the early 19th century forward. The oldest buildings are the Comstock House (c. 1830, 1132 Main Street) and Wells Hall, built in 1832 as a private academy and now serving as town hall. One of its 31 contributing buildings is the St. John's Episcopal Church, which is individually listed on the National Register; it is a fine example of Gothic Revival architecture built in 1867. Most of the commercial buildings in the district date to the period 1890-1925.

== See also ==
- National Register of Historic Places listings in Hartford County, Connecticut
