= St. James Episcopal Church (Lewistown, Illinois) =

Historic church in Illinois, United States

- U.S. National Register of Historic Places
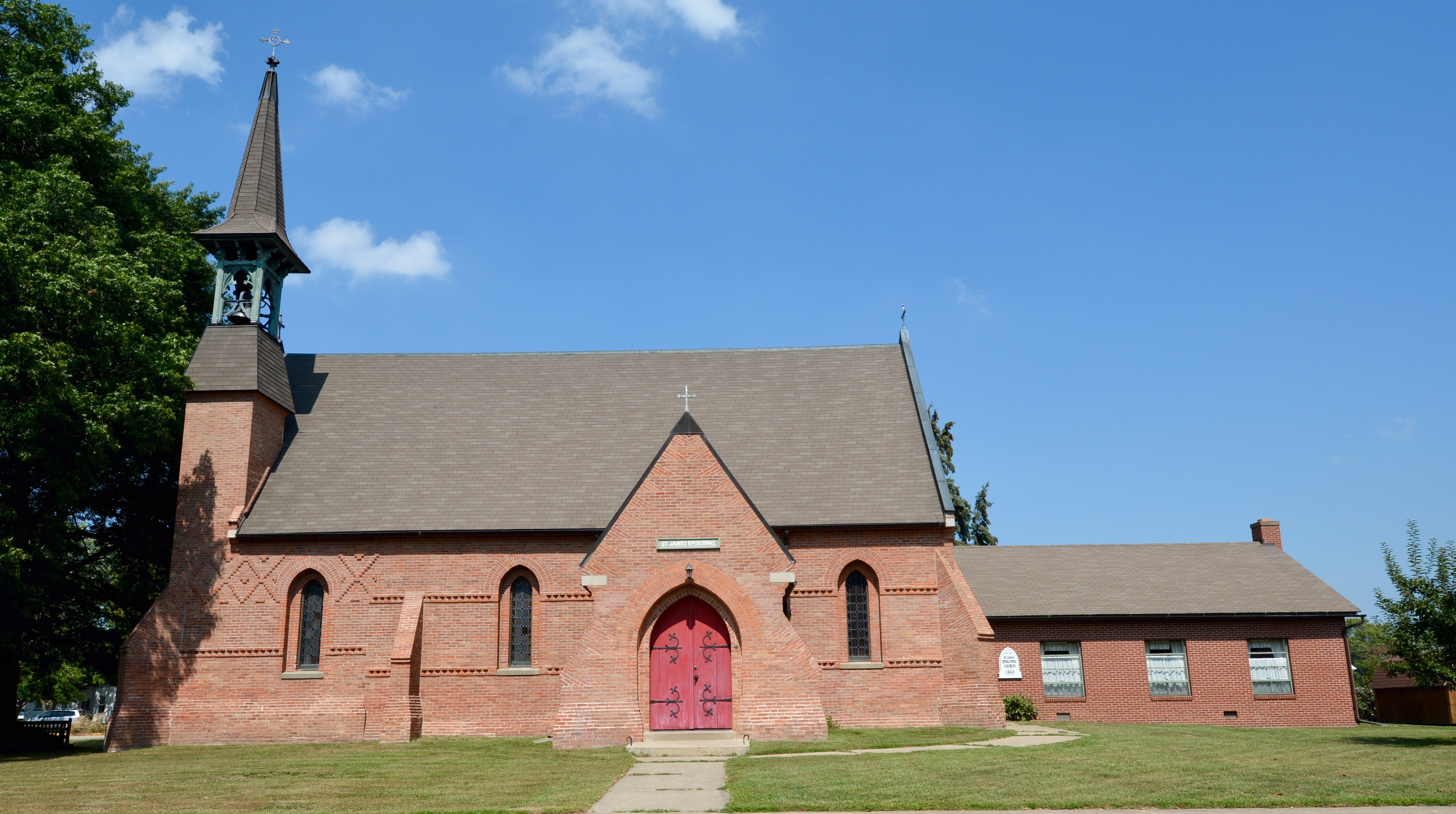

- Location within Illinois Location within the United States
- Location: NE corner of MacArthur and Broadway, Lewistown, Illinois
- Coordinates: 40°23′56″N 90°9′6″W
- Built: 1863-65
- Architect: Potter, Edward Tuckerman
- NRHP reference No.: 74000761
- Added to NRHP: December 31, 1974

St. James Episcopal Church is an Episcopal church located at the northeast corner of MacArthur and Broadway in Lewistown, Illinois. The church serves the Lewistown Episcopal parish, which formed in 1860, six years after Episcopal services began in the city. S. Corning Judd, the senior warden of the parish, obtained plans for the church building from architect Edward Tuckerman Potter in 1862, and construction began on the church in 1863. Work on the church was finished in 1865, and church services began in the same year. The church took its name from St. James Cathedral in Chicago, since the bishop of that church granted Lewistown its parish. The red brick church's Gothic design features diagonal buttresses, arched windows and an arched door, decorative brickwork forming a pattern of X's on the west side, and a small bell tower.

The church was added to the National Register of Historic Places on December 31, 1974.
