= St. John's Episcopal Church (East Hartford, Connecticut) =

Historic church in Connecticut, United States

- U.S. National Register of Historic Places
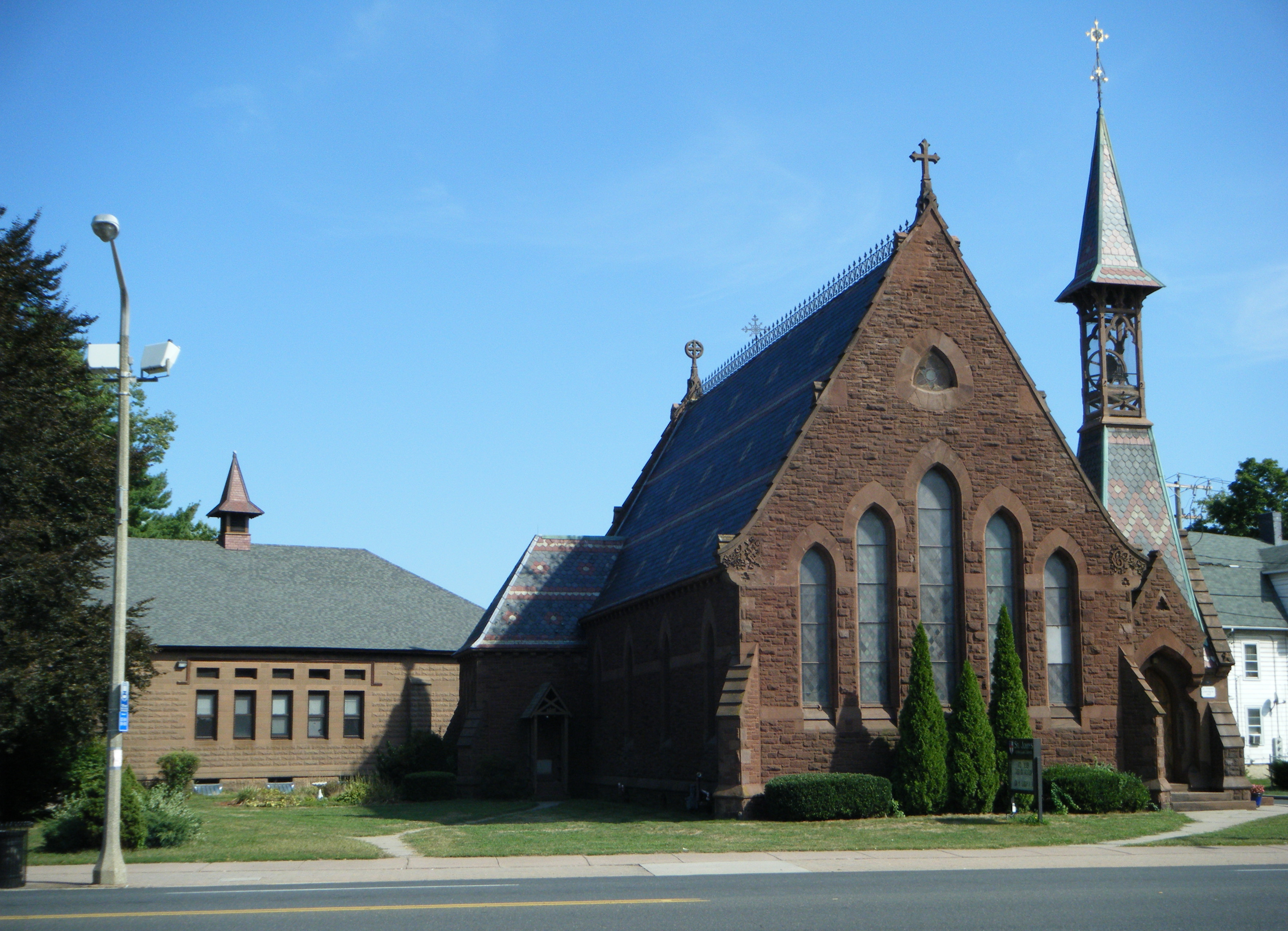

- Location within Connecticut Location within the United States
- Location: 1160 Main Street, East Hartford, Connecticut
- Coordinates: 41°46′25″N 72°38′27″W
- Area: 1 acre (0.40 ha)
- Built: 1867
- Architect: Tuckerman, Edward Potter
- Architectural style: Gothic
- NRHP reference No.: 83003567
- Added to NRHP: November 28, 1983

St. John's Episcopal Church is a historic church building at 1160 Main Street in East Hartford, Connecticut. It was designed by Edward T. Potter and was built in 1867, and is a prominent local example of High Gothic Revival executed in stone. Its congregation, begun as an Episcopal mission in 1854, has recently been merged into the St. John's Episcopal Church in Vernon. The building was listed on the National Register of Historic Places in 1983.

== Architecture and history ==
St. John's occupies a prominent location in downtown East Hartford, occupying a lot bounded on three sides by Main Street (United States Route 5), Burnside Avenue (United States Route 44), and Rector Street. It is a large single-story brownstone structure, with a steeply pitched polychrome slate roof, and a series of lancet-arched Gothic windows in the gable end facing the street. At the rear of the church, oriented perpendicular to its main axis, is a parish hall, built in 1912, in an early use of concrete blocks as a building material.

The first Episcopal mission in East Hartford was established by students of Trinity College in 1842, but did not last. A second effort in 1852 was more successful, resulting in the formal establishment of the mission in 1854. Prior to the construction of this building, the congregation met in a variety of locations, and had several different names before settling on St. John's Church in 1868. Its first minister was John James McCook, a Trinity graduate. McCook served as the parish minister for 61 years, and was probably involved in the design and construction plans for the church. The church is one of a small number of works in Connecticut by Potter, who was a protégé of Richard Upjohn, and would attend services here.

== See also ==
- National Register of Historic Places listings in Hartford County, Connecticut
