= Clarkson Nott Potter =

American politician (1825–1882)

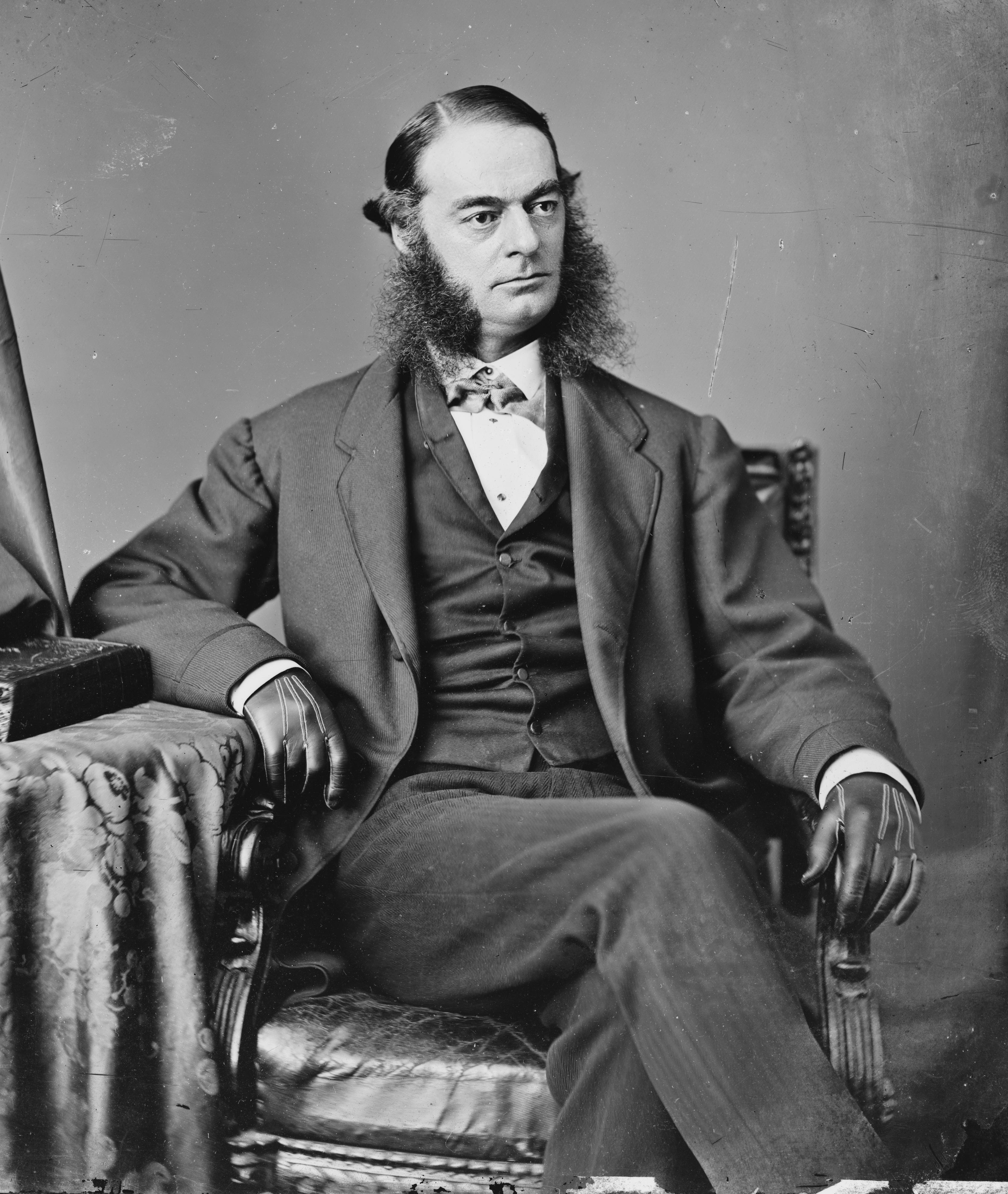
- Potter, 1860–1875

Member of the U.S. House of Representatives from New York
- In office March 4, 1869 – March 3, 1875
- Preceded by: William H. Robertson
- Succeeded by: Benjamin A. Willis
- Constituency: 10th district (1869–1873); 11th district (1873–1875)
- In office March 4, 1877 – March 3, 1879
- Preceded by: Nathaniel H. Odell
- Succeeded by: Waldo Hutchins
- Constituency: 12th district

Personal details
- Born: April 25, 1825 Schenectady, New York, U.S.
- Died: January 23, 1882 (aged 56) New York City, New York, U.S.
- Party: Democratic
- Spouse: Virginia Mitchell (m. 1851)
- Relations: Howard Potter (brother); Robert B. Potter (brother); Edward T. Potter (brother); Henry C. Potter (brother); William A. Potter (brother)
- Children: 5
- Parent(s): Alonzo Potter; Sarah Nott Potter
- Education: Union College; Rensselaer Polytechnic Institute
- Occupation: Civil engineer, lawyer

Clarkson Nott Potter (April 25, 1825 – January 23, 1882) was a New York attorney and politician who served four terms in the United States House of Representatives from 1869 to 1875, then again from 1877 to 1879.

== Early life ==
Potter was born in Schenectady, New York, on April 25, 1825. Potter was the eldest of seven children (six boys and one daughter) born to Sarah (née Nott) Potter (1799–1839) and Episcopalian Bishop Alonzo Potter (1800–1865) of Pennsylvania. After his mother's death in April 1839 from complications arising from giving birth to their seventh child (and only daughter), his father remarried in 1840 (to his mother's cousin Sara Benedict) and had three more children, all boys. Sara died in 1864 and his father remarried for the third time to Frances Seton, just three months before his death in July 1865. Among his siblings were brothers Howard Potter, a New York City banker, Robert Brown Potter, a General in the American Civil War (to whom he gifted a house known as "The Rocks" in Newport, Rhode Island), Edward Tuckerman Potter, an architect who designed the Nott Memorial at Union College, Henry Codman Potter, who succeeded Horatio Potter as Bishop of New York in 1887, Eliphalet Nott Potter, who served as President of Union College and Hobart College, and William Appleton Potter (1842–1909), also an architect who designed the Church of the Presidents in Elberon, New Jersey.

His mother was the only daughter of Eliphalet Nott, who served as the longtime president of Union College. His paternal grandparents were Joseph Potter and Anne Brown (née Knight) Potter and his uncle was Horatio Potter, the bishop of the Episcopal Diocese of New York.

Potter graduated from Union College in 1842, and completed his qualifications as a civil engineer at Rensselaer Polytechnic Institute in 1843.

== Career ==
After qualifying as a civil engineer, Potter relocated to Wisconsin, where he worked as an engineer and surveyor. Potter then studied law, was admitted to the bar in 1846 and returned to New York where he commenced the practice of law in New York City.

In 1868, he was elected as a Democrat to represent New York's 10th District in the 41st United States Congress. He was reelected to the 42nd and 43rd Congresses, the last term from the 11th District, and served from March 4, 1869, to March 3, 1875. He did not run for reelection in 1874.

In 1876, Potter again elected to the House, and represented New York's 12th District in the 45th Congress, serving from March 4, 1877, to March 3, 1879. During this term Potter was appointed Chairman of the Committee on Pacific Railroads. He did not run for reelection in 1878.

Potter was President of the New York State Democratic Conventions in 1875 and 1877, and he was a Delegate to the Democratic National Conventions in 1872 and 1876. He ran unsuccessfully for Lieutenant Governor of New York in 1879.

From 1863 to 1882, Potter was a trustee of Union College. He was President of the American Bar Association from 1881 until the time of his death in January 1882.

== Personal life ==
In 1851, Potter was married to Virginia Mitchell (1827–1890) of Philadelphia, the daughter of Matthew and Louisa (née Kidd) Mitchell. The Potters owned a country house, known as "Nutwood", two miles from Trinity Church in New Rochelle, overlooking the Long Island Sound. Together, they were the parents of:

- Maria Louisa Potter (1855–1882), who married Joseph Leslie Cotton of Boston in 1881. After her death, her widower remarried to the artist Mariette Leslie Cotton.
- Virginia Potter (1857–1937), who did not marry, founded several independent hotels for women in New York.
- Howard Nott Potter (1859–1937), an architect known for his design of churches. He married his first cousin, Helen Potter, the daughter of fellow architect Edward Tuckerman Potter.
- Eleanor Potter (b. c. 1862).
- Clarkson Alonzo Potter (c. 1870–c. 1936).

Potter died in New York City on January 23, 1882. After a funeral at Grace Church in New Rochelle, he was buried at Vale Cemetery in Schenectady. His estate, estimated in excess of $1,000,000, was divided among his wife and children.

== See also ==
- List of United States representatives from New York

U.S. House of Representatives
Preceded by William H. Robertson	Member of the U.S. House of Representatives from New York's 10th congressional district March 4, 1869 – March 3, 1873	Succeeded by Fernando Wood
Preceded by Charles St. John	Member of the U.S. House of Representatives from New York's 11th congressional district March 4, 1873 – March 3, 1875	Succeeded by Benjamin A. Willis
Preceded by N. Holmes Odell	Member of the U.S. House of Representatives from New York's 12th congressional district March 4, 1877 – March 3, 1879	Succeeded by Waldo Hutchins
