= Annie Pixley =

American actress

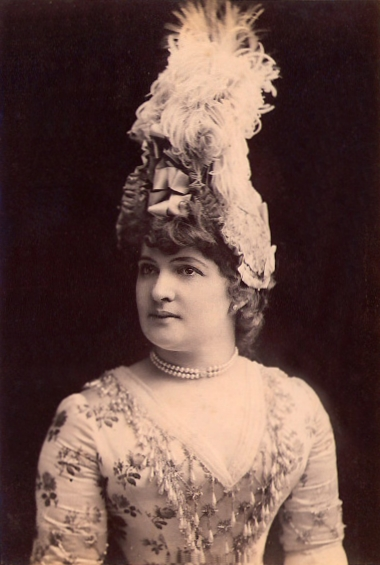
Annie Pixley

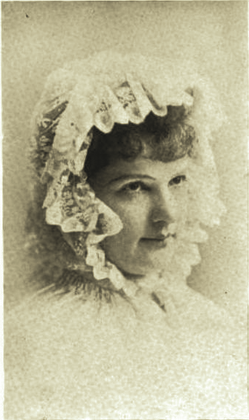
Pixley in a 1907 publication.

Annie Pixley (née Annie Shea, c.1848 – November 8, 1893) was an American stage actress.

Pixley was born in Brooklyn, and moved with her family to San Francisco. After her father died, her mother married a California rancher, and Annie took his last name, Pixley.

She made her debut performing comic opera and was well known for her work on stage. She went to Australia in 1876 and performed in comic opera there. Pixley's work in the United States included portraying the widow in The Danites and Gretchen in Rip Van Winkle. On Broadway, Pixley produced, and portrayed Ruth Homewebb, in The Deacon's Daughter (1887).

Pixley was married to Robert Fulford. Their 12-year-old son, Tommy, died in 1886, after which Pixley "lost her ebullience and her nimble grace".

She died November 8, 1893, of brain fever in London, England while visiting family. Her ashes and those of her husband and son are in a mausoleum in the Woodland cemetery in London, Ontario, Canada.
