= Robert Brown Potter =

Union Army general (1829–1887)

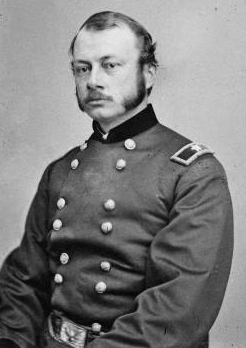
- Robert Brown Potter
- Born: July 16, 1829; Schenectady, New York, U.S.
- Died: February 19, 1887 (aged 57); Newport, Rhode Island, U.S.
- Burial place: Woodlawn Cemetery, The Bronx, New York, U.S.
- Military career
- Allegiance: United States of America; Union
- Branch: United States Army; Union Army
- Service years: 1861-1866
- Rank: Major General
- Commands: 51st New York Volunteer Infantry
- Conflicts: American Civil War: • Battle of New Bern • Second Bull Run • Battle of Antietam • Siege of Vicksburg • Knoxville Campaign • Overland Campaign • Siege of Petersburg • Battle of Fort Stedman

Robert Brown Potter (July 16, 1829 – February 19, 1887) was an American lawyer and a Union Army general in the American Civil War.

== Early life ==
Potter was born in Schenectady, New York on July 16, 1829. He was the third son of Alonzo Potter, the bishop of the Episcopal Church of Pennsylvania, and Sarah Maria (née Nott) Potter. His mother was the only daughter of Eliphalet Nott, President of Union College. After the death of his mother in 1839, his father remarried in 1840 to his mother's cousin, Sarah Benedict, with whom his mother had placed the children in the event of her death. Sarah also predeceased Bishop Potter, and three months before his death in 1865, he remarried to Frances Seton, who lived in Flushing until she died in 1909.

Potter had eight brothers and a sister, including Clarkson Nott Potter, a Democratic member of the U.S. House of Representatives; Howard Potter, an attorney and banker; Edward Tuckerman Potter, an architect who designed the Nott Memorial at Union College; Henry Codman Potter, who succeeded Horatio Potter as Bishop of New York in 1887; Eliphalet Nott Potter, an Episcopal priest and president of Hobart College; Maria Louisa Thompson, the wife of sculptor Launt Thompson; James Neilson Potter, a businessman; William Appleton Potter, an architect who designed the Church of the Presidents in Elberon, New Jersey, and Frank Hunter Potter, a journalist who was the choirmaster of the Cathedral of St. John the Divine.

== Career ==
Potter served as an attorney in New York City prior to the outbreak of the Civil War.

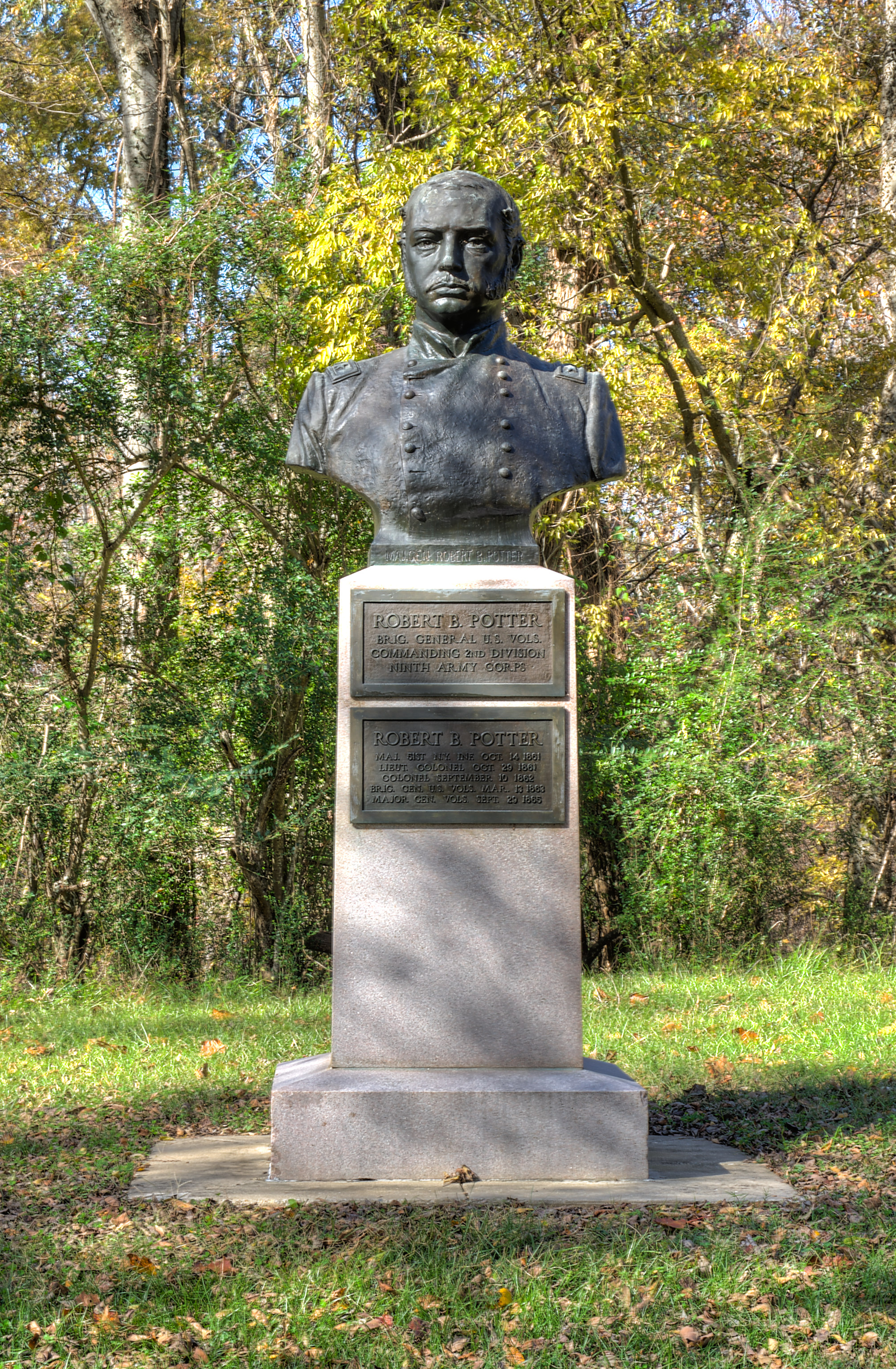
Bust of Potter by Roland Hinton Perry at Vicksburg National Military Park

=== Military career ===
At the start of the Civil War, Potter enlisted as a private in the New York militia, was promoted to lieutenant, and then commissioned as a major on October 14, 1861. He was promoted to lieutenant colonel on November 1 of that year. He was wounded at the Battle of New Bern on March 14, 1862, while serving under Brig. Gen. Ambrose E. Burnside. Potter commanded the 51st New York Volunteer Infantry in IX Corps at Second Bull Run. Promoted to the rank of colonel on September 10, he led the regiment at the Battle of Antietam. Potter was wounded while participating in Burnside's attack on the Confederate right flank at Antietam. The wound was only "slight", however, and Potter continued in command of the 51st NY regiment through the rest of the fall and winter of 1862; notably at the Battle of Fredericksburg.

Potter was promoted to the rank of brigadier general on March 13, 1863. He led the 2nd Division, IX Corps, in the siege of Vicksburg. He next commanded IX Corps in the Knoxville Campaign. After serving on recruiting duty in New York state, he was assigned in 1864 to command of the 2nd Division of IX Corps under Burnside. Potter led the division in the Overland Campaign and at the siege of Petersburg. He was wounded in the final assault on Petersburg on April 2, 1865, Potter's third wound of the war.

Upon his recovery, he was given command of the Rhode Island and Connecticut district of the Department of the East. On his wedding day was given his commission as full major general of volunteers.

He was honorably mustered out of the volunteer service, January 15, 1866.

=== Later career ===
After he retired from the military, he served for three years as receiver of the Atlantic and Great Western Railroad. He moved to England in 1869, but returned to Rhode Island in 1873, where he died in 1887.

== Personal life ==
On September 20, 1865, General Potter was married to Abigail Austin "Abby" Stevens (1836–1913). Abby was the daughter of prominent banker John Austin Stevens.

Potter died in Newport, Rhode Island on February 19, 1887. He was buried at Woodlawn Cemetery in the Bronx, New York City.
