= Alonzo Potter =

American bishop (1800–1865)

The Right Reverend Alonzo Potter D.D., LL.D.
- Bishop of Pennsylvania
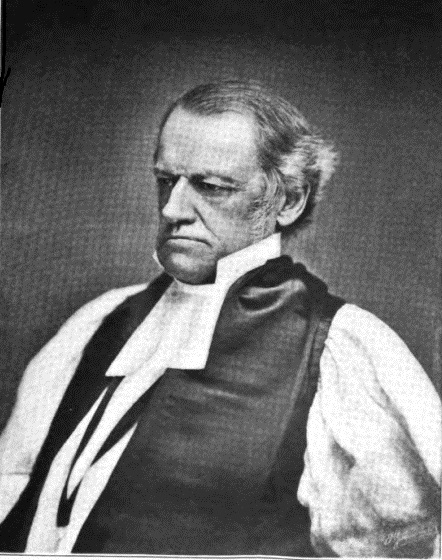
- Church: Episcopal Church
- Diocese: Pennsylvania
- Elected: May 23, 1845
- In office: 1845–1865
- Predecessor: Henry Onderdonk
- Successor: William Bacon Stevens

Orders
- Ordination: September 16, 1824 by Thomas Church Brownell
- Consecration: September 23, 1845 by Philander Chase

Personal details
- Born: July 6, 1800 Beekman, New York, United States
- Died: July 4, 1865 (aged 64) San Francisco, California, United States
- Buried: Laurel Hill Cemetery
- Denomination: Anglican
- Parents: Joseph Potter & Anne Brown Knight
- Spouse: Sarah Marie Nott (m. 1824; died 1839) Sarah Benedict (m. 1840; died 1864) Frances Seton (m. 1865)
- Children: 10

Alonzo Potter (July 6, 1800 – July 4, 1865) was an American bishop of the Episcopal Church in the United States who served as the third bishop of the Diocese of Pennsylvania.

== Early life ==
Potter was born on July 6, 1800, in Beekman, New York. He was the sixth child of Anna and Joseph Potter, who was a farmer. His ancestors emigrated from England to Portsmouth, Rhode Island, in the mid-seventeenth century. Through his grandparents Thomas Potter and Esther Sheldon, respectively, Alonzo was descended from the co-founders of Rhode Island, William Arnold and Roger Williams. There have been in the Potter family two brothers who were bishops in the Episcopal Church: Alonzo Potter was bishop of the Diocese of Pennsylvania and his younger brother Horatio Potter was bishop of the Episcopal Diocese of New York. Alonzo's son Henry Codman Potter, successor to Bishop Horatio Potter in New York, was a third.

== Education ==
Alonzo first attended the district school in his hometown. Although he was a "bright" student, he did not care for reading until he read The Life and Surprising Adventures of Robinson Crusoe. Potter was so taken with the story that he could not put it down except for eating and sleeping. He later said that from then on, "I took pleasure in books."

When Potter was twelve years old, he entered an academy in Poughkeepsie, New York. Within three years, his teacher said that, "by capacity and scholarship," Potter was ready for college. At age fifteen, Potter passed the entrance examination and enrolled in Union College in Schenectady, New York. In 1818, at age eighteen, he graduated with honors, and he "won the prize of college ambition." At his graduation, he gave the Valedictory Oration.

After graduating from Union College, Potter moved to Philadelphia to be with his brother, who was a bookseller. During this time, his interest in books continued. He also became interested in the Episcopal Church.

== Religious convictions ==
Potter's "religious convictions became so decided" in Philadelphia that he joined the Episcopal Church. He had not been baptized, so he requested and received it in St. Peter's Church, Philadelphia. Later, in Christ Church, Philadelphia, he was confirmed by Bishop White. Shortly after that, Potter decided that he wanted to be ordained in the Episcopal Church. He began theological studies under the direction of the Rev. Dr. Samuel H. Turner, afterward for many years a distinguished Professor in the General Theological Seminary. He continued studying theology after he returned to Union College as a Tutor.

While still in Philadelphia before he returned to Union College, he gave instruction to "colored persons." This action foreshadowed his later concern as a bishop for "equal rights and opportunities in Church and State to all sorts and conditions of men."

== Union College: 1821–1826 ==
In 1821, after his time with his brother in Philadelphia, Potter returned to Union College as a Tutor and soon became "Professor of Mathematics and Natural Philosophy."

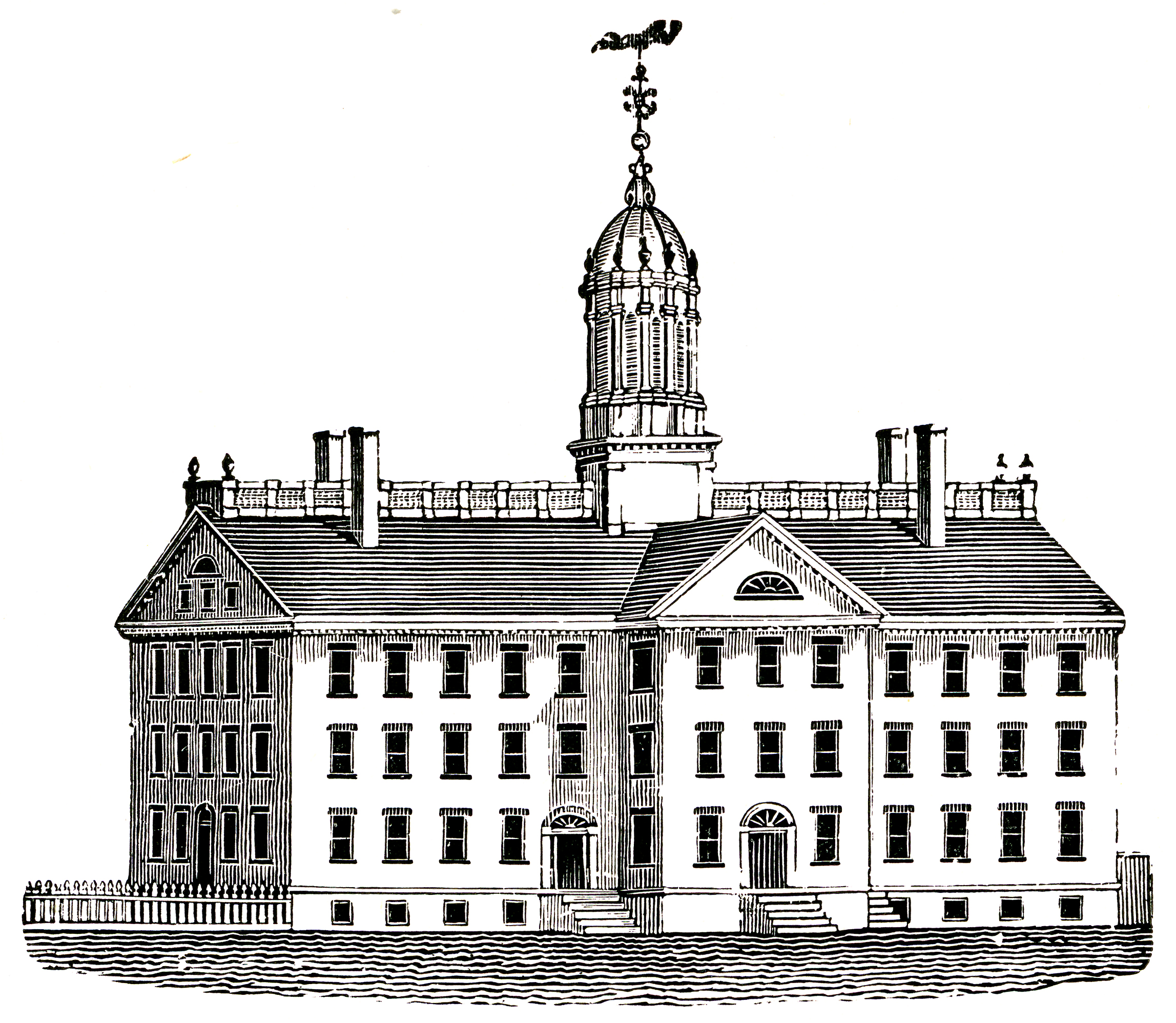
Union College, 1804

While he was teaching at Union College, Potter was made a deacon in 1822 by Bishop John Henry Hobart. When he was twenty-four years old, he was ordained Priest in 1824 by Bishop Thomas Church Brownell. Shortly after he was ordained, Potter gathered "a little congregation of blacks in Schenectady" and became their minister.

In 1823, Potter published his first book. It was A Tractate on Logarithms, by which he came to be known "as a proficient mathematician."

In 1825, Geneva College, now Hobart College, offered the twenty-five-year-old Potter its presidency. However, he declined the offer.

== Marriages ==
Potter married three times: first to Sarah Maria Nott, next to her first cousin, Sarah Benedict, and last to Frances Seton.

=== Sarah Maria Nott Potter ===
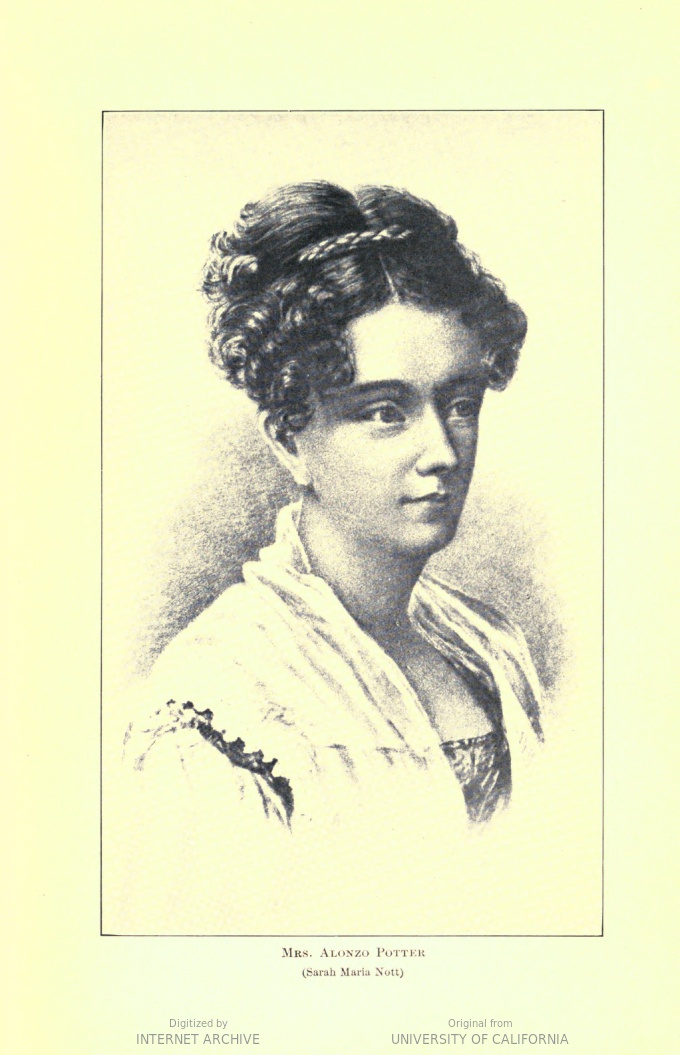
Mrs. Alonzo Potter (Sarah Maria Nott)

In 1824, Potter married Sarah Maria Nott. She was the only daughter of Eliphalet Nott, President of Union College. On March 16, 1839, Sarah Nott Potter died about four hours after giving birth to her seventh child and only daughter. Potter described his wife's many virtues: "she gave herself, seemingly without a pang, to her household, to her friends, and to anyone whom she could make more happy." She was "a centre of delight to all who knew her."

=== Sarah Benedict Potter ===
According to his wife's request, the children were placed under the care of her cousin Sarah Benedict. Alonzo married Miss Benedict in 1840. She was thirty-one years old. They had three boys. Before her death, Sarah Benedict Potter suffered from consumption, which made her "too ill to do active work." She died at their home in Philadelphia on January 29, 1864.

=== Frances Seton ===
In 1865, Potter married his third wife, Miss Frances Seton. They were married only three months before he died on July 4, 1865. She died on October 27, 1909, in Flushing, Long Island, N. Y. Her will bequeathed $10,700 to charitable and religious bodies. Of this, $5,000.00 (~$121,354 in 2024) was given to the Board of Mission of The Domestic and Foreign Missionary Society of the Protestant Episcopal Church.

== Children ==
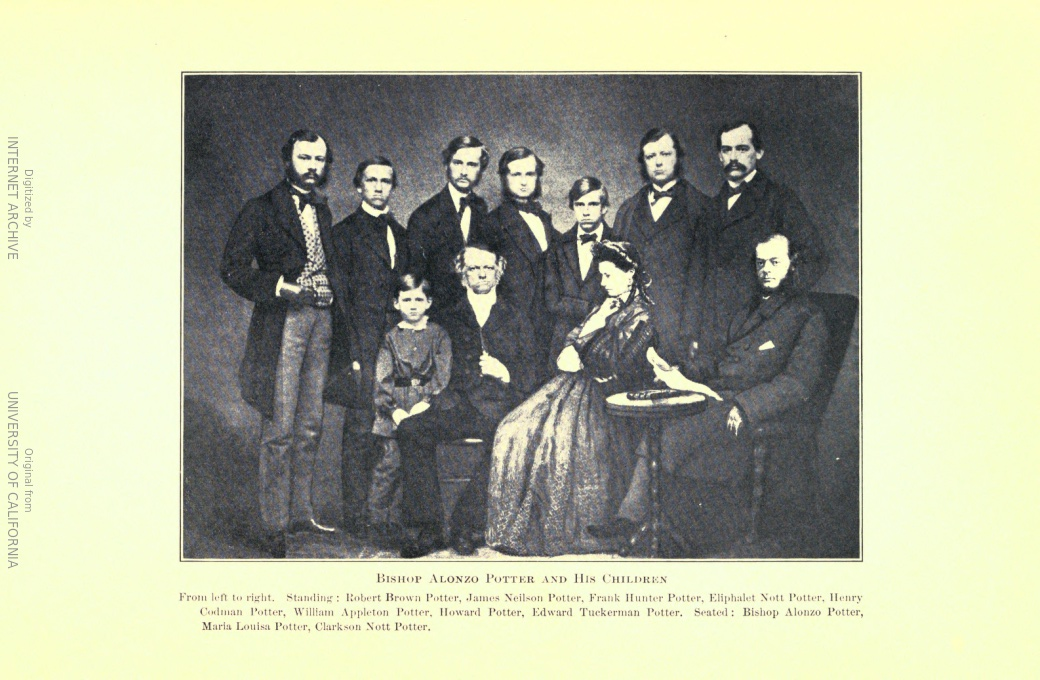
Alonzo Potter with all his ten children

In total, Alonzo Potter had ten children: seven (six boys and one daughter) by Sarah Nott and three boys by Sara Benedict.

=== Children by Sarah Nott Potter ===
- Clarkson Nott Potter (1825–1882) was a Democratic member of the House of Representatives after the Civil War.
- Howard Potter (1826–1897) was a New York City banker who was known for his contributions to the Metropolitan Museum of Art, the Museum of Natural History, the Children's Aid Society, and the New York Orthopaedic Hospital.
- Robert Brown Potter (1829–1887) was a United States General in the American Civil War and a financier.
- Edward Tuckerman Potter (1831–1904) was an architect who designed the Nott Memorial at Union College.
- Henry C. Potter (1834-1908) was a priest in the Episcopal Church and the seventh bishop of the Episcopal Diocese of New York.
- Eliphalet Nott Potter (1836-1901) was rector of an Episcopal Church, college professor, and president of three colleges.
- Maria Louisa Potter (1839-1916) married sculptor Launt Thompson and lived in Italy.

=== Children by Sarah Benedict ===
- James Neilson Potter (1841–1906).
- William Appleton Potter (1842–1909) was an American architect who designed numerous buildings, including the Church of the Presidents (New Jersey) in Elberon, New Jersey.
- Frank Hunter Potter, (1851–1932) served as a first lieutenant in the American Civil War.

== St. Paul's, Boston: 1826–1831 ==
In 1826, Potter accepted a call as rector of St. Paul's Church, Boston, Massachusetts and was instituted on August 29, 1826. He succeeded Dr. Samuel Farmar Jarvis, who, leaving the parish in 1827, left it without a rector. At the time, there was no rectorship in the Episcopal Church "more important or more difficult to fill." St. Paul's had been founded in 1820, but it did not attract a sufficient congregation, so the bishop and his presbyters vacated the rectorship. The parish was "left prostrated, depleted and in debt."

Under Potter's ministry, "a large parish was formed." His ministry includes sermons, lectures, and pastoral visits. Potter's sermons were "always Gospel truths" and "illustrated plainly." He gave weekly "evangelical lectures" on Tuesday evenings. Pastoral visits were the third factor in Potter's success. He spent all day Monday and Tuesday mornings making "general visits" to parishioners. The visits included Scripture reading and prayer. He made "visits to the sick and dying" as needed.

On May 12, 1829, Potter preached a sermon on "behalf of missions" before the Board of Directors of the Domestic and Foreign Missionary Society of the Episcopal Church. The Spirit of the Pilgrims, which was a short-lived (1828-1833) religious magazine, reported on the sermon with these words: "We have seldom read a more earnest and touching appeal on the subject of missions, particularly foreign missions, than this sermon presents... His discourse, wherever circulated, cannot fail of doing good."

Potter's work became too much for him. He began to suffer from a "partial loss of voice" and "impaired health," so, in 1831, he resigned and went back to Union College to teach. His five years in Boston had been "a marked success." Potter came to a parish marked by dissension and debt and it was marked by "unity, quietness, strength and prosperity."

== Union College: 1831–1845 ==
In 1831, Potter returned to Union College as professor of Moral and Intellectual Philosophy. Also, on demand, he taught "Greek and Latin, algebra and geometry, logic and rhetoric, technology and trigonometry." In 1838, he was elected vice-president of the college and served in that capacity until he became a bishop in 1845. While at the college and later as bishop, Potter was nationally known "as a leader in education."

While at Union College, Potter declined three offers. In November 1835, he declined the Professorship of Ecclesiastical History in the General Theological Seminary. Also in 1835, Potter declined a call to Grace Church, Boston. In 1838, he declined election as bishop coadjutor of the Diocese of Massachusetts. Although Potter's health had improved, it was, "especially in his vocal powers, far from satisfactory."

== Bishop of the Diocese of Pennsylvania: 1845–1865 ==
In 1845, Bishop Henry Ustick Onderdonk resigned his office as bishop of the Episcopal Diocese of Pennsylvania because of "widespread dissatisfaction." Furthermore, the diocese was divided between Tractarians and those who wanted a more Protestant Episcopal Church.

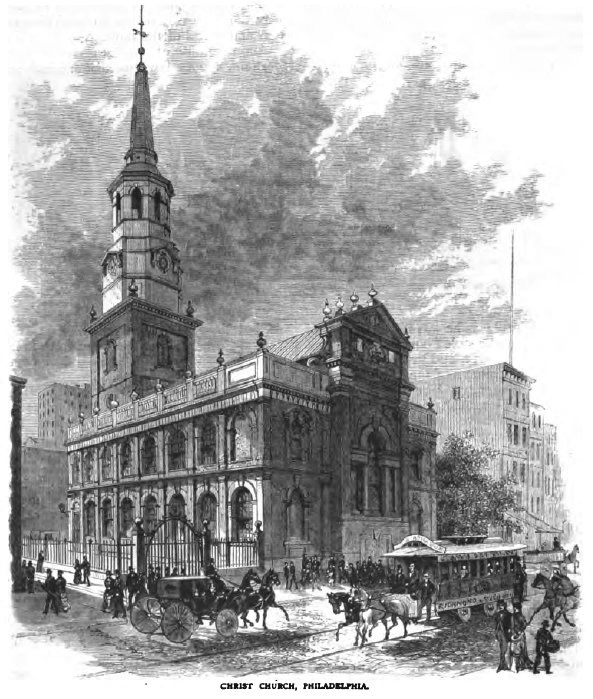
Christ Church, Philadelphia

The Diocesan Convention met in May 1845 to elect a bishop. After four days, no nominee had been elected by both orders. Then, on May 23, 1845, Potter was nominated. On the first ballot, he was elected by the clergy. The laity gave Potter their unanimous vote. On June 4, 1845, Potter wrote his "formal letter of acceptance." He was consecrated September 23, 1845, in Christ Church, Philadelphia. Bishop John Henry Hopkins of Vermont was the preacher.

On September 24, 1845, the day after his consecration, Potter consecrated a new church. Five days later, he began making visitations to the part of his Diocese farthest from Philadelphia. By May 1846, Potter "had visited every parish in his Diocese but two."

=== Lowell Lectures in Boston ===
Potter had already committed himself to deliver the Lowell Lectures in Boston. The Diocese of Pennsylvania allowed him to take time off from his episcopal duties to prepare for the lectures and deliver them. In 1847, 1848, 1849 and 1853 Potter delivered five courses of lectures on "Natural Theology and Christian Evidences." When he delivered the lectures, the Federal Street Theatre, the largest auditorium in Boston, was packed. He delivered the lectures without a manuscript. At most, he used a small piece of paper outlining his arguments. The lectures showed Potter's "intellectual power" and his "compass of knowledge."

=== Other projects ===
Besides preparing and delivering Lowell Lectures in Boston, Potter began working on philanthropic projects, which he believed the Episcopal Church should undertake, within a year after his consecration.

The Academy. In the winter of 1846, Potter, in co-operation with the Trustees, reopened the Academy of the Protestant Episcopal Church, located in Philadelphia, in the spring of 1846. The Academy attracted so many students that a new building was opened in September 1850 to accommodate one hundred and fifty youths.

Convocation System. In 1846, Potter began the Convocation system. He saw this as a better "means of promoting ministerial unity" and of "cultivating missionary work" than could be done with the existing "large districts." They worked out as he had hoped.

Young Man's Institute. When Potter moved to Philadelphia, he was shocked by the many lawless and violent young men, drinking and fighting in the streets at night. They had jobs, but they were illiterate and had no other activities available. Therefore, in 1849 and 1850, he began work which led to the formation of the Young Man's Institute. The Institute provided night-schools with libraries and reading rooms for young men more than sixteen years of age.

Clergy Daughters' Fund. In his address to the Diocesan Convention of 1849, Potter announced the establishment of the Clergy Daughters' Fund. The purpose of the Fund was "to provide free scholarships at different schools for the daughters of such Pastors as receive small salaries and live where good schools are not yet established."

Church Hospital. Dr. Caspar Morris, a Philadelphia physician had appealed for a hospital. Potter responded to the appeal and began work to establish "the Hospital of the Protestant Episcopal Church in Philadelphia." In 1850, "a comfortable house and grounds" were donated and "the Hospital began its work."

The hospital was opened on December 11, 1852. However, the house was too small and inadequate in plan for a Hospital. Money was raised for a new building and a cornerstone was laid by Potter on May 24, 1860. Enough of the hospital had been completed by 1862 that it could be used to treat Union soldiers wounded in the American Civil War.

Training Candidates for Holy Orders. In Potter's first address to his Diocesan Convention in 1846, he spoke about the need for of a Diocesan Training School to instruct Candidates for Holy Orders in the City of Philadelphia who were not able to attend the Episcopal Church's regular Seminaries. In his 1857 address Potter reported that in the last year sixteen Candidates and Deacons in Philadelphia had been instructed by him and a few of the Clergy. To more adequately meet the need for training Candidates for Holy Orders, Potter founded the Philadelphia Divinity School in 1861.

First allusion to impaired health
In his address to the 1855 Diocesan Convention, Potter spoke for the first time about his "impaired health" and that "he might need relief." For now, he said that he might reduce his activities outside the Church "to the extent, which his reduced physical ability might indicate to be proper."

=== Ten years as bishop: 1855 ===
During the 1855 Diocesan Convention, Potter "reviewed the labors and results of the ten years since his election to the Episcopate." First he reviewed his official acts. They included officiating "in public on two thousand two hundred and eighty-four occasions" and preaching "seventeen hundred sermons." Then, regarding the diocese as a whole, Potter reported that fifty-four churches had been built. The number of Clergymen had increased from121 to 167. The number of Parishes had grown from 100 to 156. Communicant strength had increased from 8,865 to 12,600. Sunday-school pupils had increased from 9,305 to 15,004.

Winter of 1855–56 in Florida
As with Potter, Mrs. Potter's health was declining. They spent the winter of 1855–56 in Florida with the hope that the mild weather would help restore their health. From Florida, Potter wrote a letter to his son Henry, who was a student at the Virginia Theological Seminary. He said, "I hope my winter will not be lost... I seem to have so much work and so short a time to live that I can poorly afford so long a vacation. It will not be lost, however, if I can renew my labors with recruited powers."

Potter reported on the state of his health at the Diocesan Convention of 1856. He was not "sanguine in respect to the future," but he assured the Convention that he would perform his "proper discharge of duty." For the future, he said that he would "not feel authorized to apply for an Assistant unless in my own judgment and that of my medical advisers such a measure is urgently required." In the meantime, he suggested that "the whole subject" of his health be put to rest.

=== Illness and trip to Europe: 1858 ===
On February 10, 1858, Potter was ordaining a deacon in Christ Church, Greensburg, where his son Henry was rector. During the service, Potter faltered "once or twice" and "slightly stumbled." After the service, he went to his son's house and laid down. At dinner, "he became very ill" and "staggered" with his son's assistance, to his room. In a week, he had improved enough ("though still feeble") to return to Philadelphia.

After this attack, at the urging of "his friends and the Diocese," Potter left for Europe on April 30, 1858, to recuperate to recuperate. He spent most of the time in England at Great Malvern, a healing resort. However, his stay there did not "give him strength." He also spent time at a "resort for invalids in the South of France." After his attempt to recuperate in Europe, Potter returned with a "faded look and shrunken form."

During Potter's time in Europe, Samuel Bowman was elected as his assistant bishop. However, Bishop Bowman died of a heart attack in less than three years. On October 18, 1861, the Convention elected William Bacon Stevens as the assistant bishop.

=== Race relations ===
Potter's care for blacks "had been manifested in his boyhood, at his brother's house in Philadelphia, and again in his ministry to the colored people while a Professor at Schenectady."

In 1845, the first year of Potter's episcopate, he supported the efforts of some Episcopal laymen to provide for the "spiritual good" for the "colored population of Philadelphia" that lived in neighborhoods "festering with filth and corruption." In 1846, the Church of the Crucifixion was founded. It was an integrated church with black and white worshiping together. The Church of the Crucifixion had the distinction of being "admitted into communion with the Diocese at one convention and thrown out at the next."

When the church was admitted into union with the Diocesan Convention, its representatives were white and nothing was said about its being mostly "composed of people of African descent." When that became known, at the next Convention the representatives were not admitted and the issue was debated "for several successive Conventions." When "the issue was finally to be decided," Potter, believing "that truth and justice were ... compromised," spoke to a Convention, as the presiding officer in his episcopal "gown of office." With honesty and passion, he spoke against the "prejudice and injustice" that denied the Church of the Crucifixion admission to the convention. When Potter put the question for a vote, called his name first rather than last so that it could be known by the convention.

=== Muhlenberg Memorial ===
In 1853, at the Episcopal Church's General Convention, the Rev. William Augustus Muhlenberg and others presented what came to be called "The February 16, 2017Muhlenberg Memorial." The Memorial "upheld the traditional catholic teaching of the Episcopal Church concerning the Creeds, the Eucharist, and episcopal ordination." At the same time, it asked for "as much freedom in opinion, discipline, and worship as is compatible with the essential faith and order of the Gospel." The Memorial urged two specific things: 1. Episcopal bishops should ordain Protestant clergy "who could accept the basic teachings of the Episcopal Church" and 2. The Episcopal Church should relax "somewhat the rigidity of her Liturgical services."

Potter was "the chief defender" of the Memorial. This placed him "on the side of liberty and church expansiveness." In his essay on "Church Comprehension and Church Unity," published soon after in the 1857 volume of Memorial Papers, Potter wrote: "Our Church recognizes the cardinal fact that large diversities of opinion are compatible with loyalty to a common Saviour ... Advances toward the restoration of Christian unity can be made more gracefully by no Church than by ours."

=== Church unity ===
Church unity was one of the issues which Potter addressed.

Within the Episcopal Church
Potter was "opposed to party prejudices." He warned his son Henry "against excessive views or censorious judgments of those with whom he could not agree." Potter believed the Episcopal Church should embrace both high church and low church members. Alonzo Potter's son Eliphalet Nott Potter wrote about his father's not belonging to any Church party: "He did not believe in the necessity of partisan action within the Church," and "he did not claim to belong to any Church party as such."

In a letter of June 7, 1845, Potter wrote that God was preparing to fill the church "not only with unity, but also with purity." The next year, in May 1846, after becoming a bishop, Potter said in his first address to the Diocesan Convention that a bishop should live "for the promotion of a spirit of unity and peace in the household of faith." The Episcopal Church's General Convention of October 1853, established a Commission on Church Unity. Potter was an active member.

In Potter's 1857 essay on "Church Comprehension and Church Unity," published in the volume of Memorial Papers, he wrote that "The theory of our Church recognizes the cardinal fact that large diversities of opinion are compatible with loyalty to a common Saviour."

Between denominations
Potter believed that the Episcopal Church should lead the way "toward the restoration of Christian unity" because it can be made "more gracefully" by the Episcopal Church than any other. Regarding the Roman Catholic Church, Potter said that a "union with Rome ... must not be solely through concessions of ours." Rome must also make concessions, by which it would become a reasonable union resulting from "principles common to us both." Potter saw "the process of reunion" as a matter of give and take compromise.

=== Controversy with Bishop Hopkins over slavery ===
Potter was an opponent of slavery and published a reply to the pro-slavery arguments of Bishop John Henry Hopkins (1792-1868) of Vermont. In January 1861, Hopkins gave several men who had asked for his opinions regarding "the Biblical argument on the subject of Negro slavery in the Southern States." Hopkins sent them a pamphlet he had written on the Bible View of Slavery in which he argued that "there was a clear biblical sanction for the practice." The pamphlet and its contents were widely disseminated in New York City.

In May 1863, after President Abraham Lincoln's Emancipation Proclamation Bishop Hopkins authorized the publication of his paper entitled "Bible View of Slavery," In the paper, Hopkins argued that "there was a clear biblical sanction for slavery that it "should be gradually abolished with respect for the rights of southern states, but that abolition had no biblical or theological warrant."

Potter and some two hundred of his clergy issued a response, wherein they said,

This attempt not only to apologize for Slavery in the abstract, but to advocate it as it exists in the cotton States, and in the States which sell men and women in the open market as their staple product, is, in their judgment, unworthy of any servant of Jesus Christ, as an effort to sustain, on Bible principles, the States in rebellion against the Government, in the wicked attempt to establish, by force of arms, a tyranny under the name of a Republic, whose corner-stone shall be the perpetual bondage of the African, it challenges their indignant reprobation.

In 1864, Hopkins published a response to A Scriptural, Ecclesiastical, and Historical View of Slavery: From the Days of the Patriarch Abraham, to the Nineteenth Century. Addressed to the Right Rev. Alonzo Potter In the book, Bishop Hopkins said to Potter, "I am sorry to be obliged to charge you, not only with a gross insult against your senior, but with the more serious offense of a false accusation."

Potter not only opposed Hopkins' defense of slavery, he was also worried about "the danger of clerical demagoguery." Therefore, he wrote to the diocesan clergy "urging them to remember that as Ministers of the Prince of Peace" and that "it is our duty as far as possible to avoid all unseemly exhibitions of feeling and to bear with serene patience any seeming provocation that may be presented."

== Potter by characteristics ==
William Bacon Stevens, who succeeded Potter as bishop of the Diocese of Pennsylvania, delivered A Discourse about Potter to the 1865 General Convention of the Episcopal Church in which spoke about Potter's "several characteristics and labours," namely, an educationist, a parochial minister, a legislator in the Church, a philosopher, a philanthropist, a patriot, and a bishop.

Potter as an educator
Potter was a leader in all the educational movements of his time. He worked "to perfect and extend the benefits of popular education."

Potter was active in the formation of the American Association for the Advancement of Education, which was a forerunner of the modern National Education Association. He participated in the first meetings in 1849 and 1850. At the second meeting, Potter was appointed as chairman of a committee to write a constitution for the Association. He presided over the 1851 and 1820 meetings.

In 1843, Potter wrote the first part of The School and the Schoolmaster with the title of "The School; its Objects, Relations, and Uses." Thirteen thousand copies were distributed in New York state and five thousand copies in Massachusetts. Also, thousands of copies were distributed in the other states.

Potter as a parochial minister
Potter served as a parochial minister only during the five years he was the Rector of St. Paul's from 1826 to 1831. However, his "effective work" demonstrated his capability as a parochial minister. When Potter arrived, St. Paul's was "almost like a dismantled and half water-logged ship ready to sink." By his ministry, the parish was "righted and refitted."

Potter as a legislator in the Church
As a Legislator in the Church, Potter was viewed "as wise and progressive." In the Massachusetts and New York Diocesan Conventions, he took "a prominent part" and his views were respected.

As a member of the House of Bishops, Potter influenced its legislation in "beneficial" ways.legislation. In 1835, the Muhlenberg Memorial urged the House of Bishops to relax "somewhat the rigidity of her Liturgical services." Potter was "the most able and influential champion" of the Memorial. In this he took a position "on the side of liberty and church expansiveness."

Potter as a philosopher
Potter studied and mastered "the theory, history, definitions and criticism of the great schools of philosophy." His Lowell Lectures in Boston demonstrate that Potter was "a Christian philosopher of the highest order."

Potter as a philanthropist
As a Philanthropist, Potter was "a benefactor of humankind."

In Potter's ministry, the temperance problem was one of the issues he addressed. By his refusal to drink or serve alcoholic drinks and by his lectures and writings, Potter worked "to overcome the far-spreading evils of intemperance." In 1852, Potter gave an address in Pittsburgh on Drinking Usages of Society which became a national temperance influence in pamphlet form." Alonzo told "those earlier Pittsburghers, "Our simple duty is to prevent drunkenness"; or when he declares, "To arrest an evil effectually we must know its nature and its cause." In his preface to a volume of Discourses published in 1851, he claims that his general purpose is to deal with "topics connected with the interests of the clerical profession, i.e., the extension of the Christian church and the welfare of society."

Potter was actively involved in "the relief of the sick, the poor, the infirm." He held office in the Institution for the Deaf and Dumb, in the New York House of Refuge, and in the Prison Discipline Society. He served as President of the Hospital of the Protestant Episcopal Church and of the Asylum for Feeble-Minded Children. Potter was so active in philanthropic agencies because he believed that the Church should create and administer them.

In Potter's ministry, "the Negro question" was one of the issues he dealt with. Right after graduating from Union College, Potter gave instruction to "colored persons" in Philadelphia. As a bishop, he continued his concern for "equal rights and opportunities in Church and State to all sorts and conditions of men," including the "colored race."

Potter as a patriot
On Thanksgiving Day, November 23, 1848, Potter delivered a discourse in which he laid out four teachings from his biblical text about patriotism:

1. That nations, as well as individuals, are immediately accountable to God.
2. That they ought to look with increased abhorrence on war and on all its accessories.
3. That they should shun alike law without liberty and liberty without law, and
4. That they should ever beware of a civilization, however refined, which is not enlightened and animated by a healthy national conscience—or in other words, which is not founded on the immovable rock of public and private morality.

Potter strongly supported the United States government during the American Civil War. After the war began, Potter's address to the next Diocesan Convention about the situation included these words: "Let us implore in behalf of all who are in civil or military authority the heavenly wisdom and longsuffering which they so much need." After President Abraham Lincoln's Emancipation Proclamation, Potter saw the need to provide the Freedmen with food, education, and the Christian religion.

Potter as a bishop
Potter understood his office as a bishop as "guiding the Church, shaping great institutions of charity or learning, moulding the clergy." For his work as a bishop, he was "honored not only by the Episcopal Church, but by all denominations of Christians."

Sympathy with his Clergy was of the marks of Potter's Episcopate. In part his sympathy was expressed in "individual expressions of friendship, consolatory, vindicative and admonitory." He also expressed his sympathy by "securing a better provision for the maintenance and comfort of themselves and their families."

== Last voyage, death, and burial: 1865 ==
On March 30, 1865, Potter left from New York for California as a guest of the Pacific Mail Steamship Company. This seemed a good way to regain his health. On the voyage he was active. He held services and preached on the voyage. Along the way, when the ship stopped at major ports, Potter went ashore and engaged in activities such as sightseeing, conducting worship services, and meeting local people. On June 29, 1865, as the ship was nearing San Francisco, Potter became dangerously ill. When the ship arrived in San Francisco on July 1, 1865, Potter was too sick to leave his cabin, The physician diagnosed the disease as the malignant Panama Fever. Potter died on July 4, 1865. His corpse was taken to Grace Cathedral, San Francisco, until it could be sent to Philadelphia.

Potter's funeral was in Christ Church, Philadelphia, on September 11, 1865. It was in this church that Potter had been consecrated bishop on September 23, 1845. He was buried in Laurel Hill Cemetery, Philadelphia.

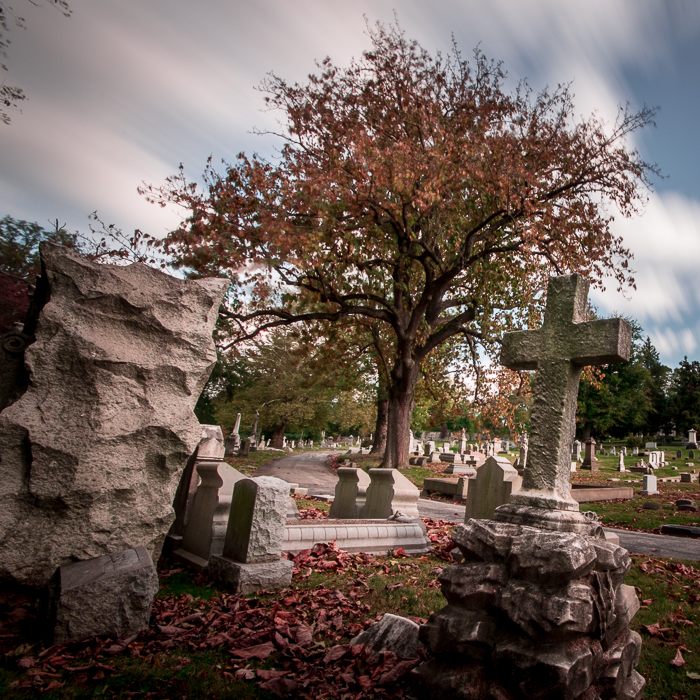
Laurel Hill Cemetery

== Honorary degrees and positions ==
Potter was one of the vice-presidents of the Pennsylvania Bible Society during his episcopate.

In 1844, Potter was elected as a member of the American Philosophical Society.

After Potter moved to Philadelphia, he was elected a Trustee of the University of Pennsylvania.

Potter was awarded the degrees of D. D. and LL. D.

== Legacy ==
In Christ Church, Schenectady, N. Y., there are tablets to Potter, his wife Sarah Maria Nott, and their children with information about them.

In his 1871 Memoirs, Bishop Howe wrote that Potter "had identified himself with all the best interests of society, and good men of every name felt that a beneficent power was withdrawn when Alonzo Potter" died.

The Schaff–Herzog Encyclopedia of Religious Knowledge said that Potter was considered one of the best American preachers of his time.

The Alonzo Potter Diocesan Library and Reading-Room in Philadelphia was named for Potter.

A 1933 biography of Potter said that as bishop of the Diocese of Pennsylvania, he left "a record of twenty years in that office probably never surpassed." Except for the Revolutionary hero, Bishop White, Potter was "the greatest bishop ever ruling in the State of Pennsylvania."

== Works ==
Potter wrote many books and edited many reprints and collections of sermons and lectures. According to his New York Times obituary, his Handbook for Readers and Students "had a wide circulation and great popularity among young men engaged in study."

=== Books ===
- No Church Without a Bishop, Or a Peep into the Sanctuary (Boston: no publisher, 1845).
- A Treatise on Logarithms (1823) This book gave Potter "rank as a proficient mathematician."
- Political Economy: its Objects, Uses, and Principles Considered with Reference to the Condition of the American People with a Summary, for the Use of Students (Harper and Brothers, 1840).
- The School and the Schoolmaster (Boston: W. B. Fowle & N. Carpenter, 1843). Part I by Alonzo Potter; "The School; its Objects, Relations, and Uses." Part II. by George Barrell Emerson. The book had a large circulation and great influence.
- The Uses and Advantages of Sunday Schools (Tract Committee of the Diocese of Massachusetts, 1846).
- Handbook for Readers and Students (Harper & brothers, 1843 4th edition, 1855).
- Discourse, Pronounced at Schenectady, July 22, 1845 on the Fiftieth Anniversary of the Foundation of Union College, Schenectady (I. Riggs, 1845).
- Evening Schools and District Libraries: An Appeal to Philadelphians, in Behalf of Improved Means of Education and Selfculture, for Apprentices and Young Workmen (King & Baird, 1850). Potter chaired the committee that produced this book.
- The Proper Method Matter and Object of Ministerial Study: a Charge to the Clergy of the Protest ant Episcopal Church in Pennsylvania, Delivered in St. Andrew's Church, Philadelphia, Wednesday, May 22, 1850. (King & Baird, 1850).
- Education of Idiots: An Appeal to the Citizens of Philadelphia, Signed by A. Potter, J. K. Kane, G. B. Wood, and others (H. Evans, 1853).
- Lectures on the Evidences of Christianity Delivered in Philadelphia by Clergymen of the Protestant Episcopal Church in the Fall and Winter of 1853-4 (E. H. Butler, 1855).
- The Principles of Science applied to the Domestic and Mechanic Arts (Harper and Brothers, rev. ed. 1855).
- John Rogers Bolles, A Reply to Bishop Hopkins' View of Slavery and a Review of the Times (1865).
- John Rogers Bolles A reply to Bishop Hopkins' View of Slavery and a Review of the Times. (1865). Bolles narrates the controversy between Bishop Potter and Bishop Potter and his clergy skewed in defense of Hopkins.
- Discourses, Charges, Addresses, Pastoral Letters, etc. (E. H. Butler, 1858).
- Occasional Services for Missionary Meetings, etc. (Philadelphia, 1861).
- William Welsh, Lay Co-operation in St. Mark's Church, Frankford, Philadelphia, January 1861 (King & Baird, 1861. Written at the request of Potter as recorded in the book.
- Religious Philosophy or Nature, Man, and the Bible Witnessing to God and to Religious Truth. The substance of four courses of lectures delivered before the Lowell Institute between the years 1845-1853 (J. B. Lippencott, 1872).

=== Sermons, addresses, discourses ===
- A Sermon, Delivered in Christ Church, Hartford, Before the Connecticut Church Scholarship Society, Aug. 5, 1829 (Putnam and Hunt, 1830).
- An Appeal in Behalf of Missions: Addressed to Episcopalians. A Sermon Preached before the Board of Directors of the Domestic and Foreign Missionary Society of the Protestant Episcopal Church in the United States of America, in St. James' Church, Philadelphia, on Tuesday, May 12, 1829 (P. & C. Williams, 1829).
- Christian Philanthropy: A discourse, preached in St. George's Church, Schenectady, Sunday evening, January 13, 1833, before the African School Society (1833).
- An Address Delivered December 9th, 1835, before the Mechanics' Literary and Benevolent Society of Poughkeepsie, at the Opening of Their First Course of Lectures (S. S. Riggs, 1836).
- Primary Address to the Convention of the Protestant Episcopal Church in the Diocese of Pennsylvania, Delivered May 20, 1846 (King & Baird, 1846).
- A Sermon Before the Churchmen's Missionary Association of the Port of Philadelphia (S. H. George, 1848).
- Address of the Right Rev. A. Potter, D. D. to the Sixty-fourth Convention of the Protestant Episcopal Church in the Diocese of Pennsylvania. Delivered May 17, 1848 (King & Baird, 1848).
- A Discourse Delivered in St. Luke's Church, Philadelphia: November 23, 1848, Being the Day of Public Thanksgiving (King & Baird, 1848).
- A Charge to the Clergy of the Diocese of Pennsylvania: Delivered at the Opening of the Sixty-fifth Convention, May 16, 1849. (King and Baird, 1849).
- A Discourse Delivered in St. Luke's Church, Philadelphia on November 23, 1848 Being the Day of Public Thanksgiving (King & Baird, 1848).
- The Christian Bishop: a Sermon Preached at St. George's Church, New York, November 20, 1851 (Stanford & Swords,1851).
- Third and Fourth Charges to the Clergy of the Diocese of Pennsylvania, Delivered at the Opening of the Sixty-seven and Sixty-eight Conventions, May 1851, and 1852. (King & Baird, 1852).
- Drinking Usages of Society: Being the Substance of a Lecture Delivered by Request in the Masonic Hall, Pittsburgh, on Saturday Evening, April 3, 1852 (Massachusetts Temperance Society, 1852).
- An Address to the Clergy and Laity of the Diocese of Pennsylvania: Delivered at the Opening of the Sixty-eighth Convention, May, 1852 (King & Baird, 1852).
- The Eleventh Annual Address to the Convention of the P.E. Church in Pennsylvania (J. S. McCalla's Book Press, 1856).
- National Accountability: the Stewardship of Nations, a Sermon Preached on Thanksgiving Day, November 26, 1857.
- Southern Slavery in Its Present Aspects: Containing a Reply to a Late Work of the Bishop of Vermont on Slavery (J. B. Lippincott & Company, 1864). The reply was issued in September 1863 by Potter and one hundred sixty-three of his clergy to a biblical justification of slavery by the Bishop of Vermont John Henry Hopkins entitled Bible View of Slavery.

=== Contributions to books ===
- Essays, Moral, Economical, and Political by Francis Bacon (Harper and Brothers, 1844). Potter wrote an Introductory Essay on pages v-xxxv.
- George D. Miles, Memoir of Ellen Mae Woodward, Second edition (Lindsay & Blakiston, 1852). Contains a preface by Potter.
- Formal opening of Franklin and Marshall College in the city of Lancaster, June 7, 1853: together with addresses delivered on the occasion, by Hon. A. L. Hayes, Rev. J. W. Nevin, D. D., and Right Rev. Alonzo Potter, D. D.. Potter's address in on page 37–44.
- Lectures on the Evidences of Christianity: Delivered in Philadelphia by Clergymen of the Protestant Episcopal Church in the Fall and Winter of 1853-4 (E. H. Butler, 1855). Contains an Introduction and Lecture by Potter.
- Christ Church Hospital: Proceedings on the Occasion of Laying the Corner-stone of the New Hospital in Belmont, Philadelphia, including the Address of the Right Rev. Alonzo Potter (E.C. and J. Biddle, 1856).
- Memorial Papers: (E. H. Butler & Co., 1857). Potter wrote the Introduction and a chapter.
- Lectures on Temperance (Sheldon, Blakeman, 1857). Includes an "Address on the Drinking Usages of Society" by Potter, pages 315–336.
- Notes of Hospital Life, from November, 1861 to August, 1863 (Lippincott and Co. 1864). Potter wrote the Introduction.
- The Sunday School Chant and Tune Book: a Collection of Canticles, Hymns and Carols for the Sunday Schools of the Episcopal Church (E. P. Dutton, 1868). Preface contains a letter by Potter requesting that the Collection be chosen and published.

== Sources ==
- Hodges, George (1915). Henry Codman Potter, seventh bishop of New York. Macmillan. p. 389.
- Howe, Mark Antony De Wolfe (1871). Memoirs of the Life and Services of the Rt. Rev. Alonzo Potter, D.D., LL.D.,: Bishop of the Protestant Episcopal Church in the Diocese of Pennsylvania. J.B. Lippincott Company. Howe served as the first Bishop of the Episcopal Diocese of Central Pennsylvania.
- Potter, Frank Hunter (1923). The Alonzo Potter Family. Rumford Press.
- Sheerin, James (1933). Henry Codman Potter, an American metropolitan. Fleming H. Revell Company.
- Stevens, William Bacon (1866). A Discourse Commemorative of the Rt. Rev. Alonzo Potter, D.D., LL. D.: Late Bishop of the Diocese of Pennsylvania : Delivered Before the General Convention of the Protestant Episcopal Church, in St. Luke's Church, Philadelphia, October 19th, 1865. McCalla & Stavely, Printers. Stevens was assistant to and successor to Potter.

Episcopal Church (USA) titles
Preceded by Henry Ustick Onderdonk	3rd Bishop of Pennsylvania; 1843-1865	Succeeded by William B. Stevens
