= Johnson Hagood =

Johnson Hagood may refer to:

- Johnson Hagood (governor) (1828–1898), American Civil War soldier and Governor of South Carolina, 1880–1882
- Johnson Hagood (1873–1948), American World War I general

== See also ==
- Johnson Hagood Stadium, Charleston, South Carolina
