= Services of Supply, American Expeditionary Forces =

Services of Supply American Expeditionary Forces
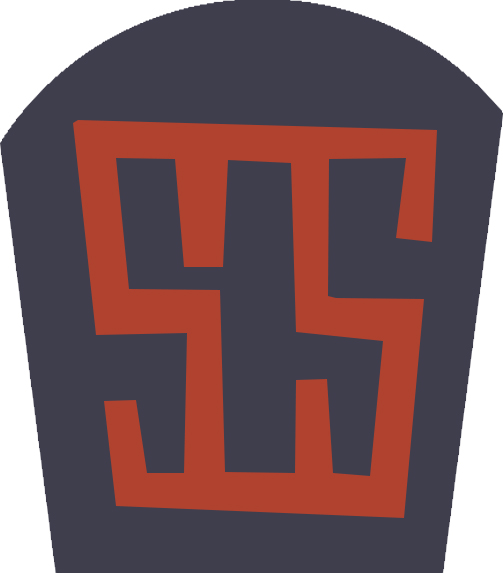
- S. O. S. Distinctive Cloth Insignia
- Active: 1917 – 1919
- Disbanded: August 31, 1919
- Country: United States
- Branch: Army
- Role: Combat service support
- Headquarters: Tours, France
- Nickname: S. O. S.
- Engagements: World War I; Defensive Sector

Commanders
- Notable commanders: Major General Francis J. Kernan; Major General James G. Harbord

The Services of Supply (S. O. S.) was the support chain of the American Expeditionary Forces in France, England, Italy and the Netherlands during World War I. It was disbanded on August 31, 1919, in France.

== Organization ==
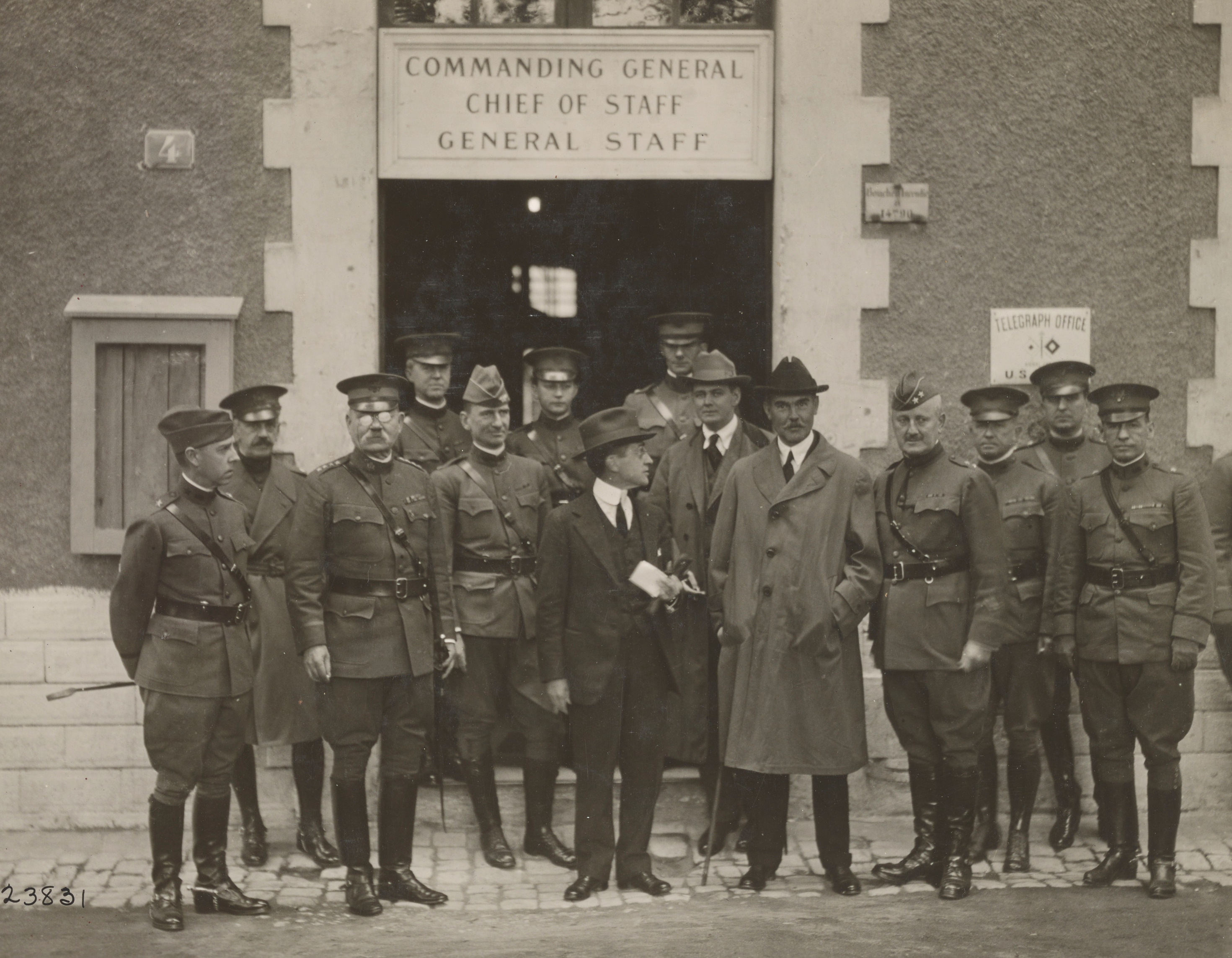
Major General James Harbord (fourth from the right), commander of the SOS, and members of his staff, with a delegation led by Secretary of War Newton D. Baker (center) at the SOS headquarters at Tours, France, October 1918.

The Services of Supply (SOS) of the American Expeditionary Forces (AEF) was established under the designation "Line of Communications," on July 5, 1917. The Line of Communications was judged by senior officers, including Colonel Johnson Hagood, who was in charge of the advance section, to be incompetent. It was re-designated "Service of the Rear" on February 16, 1918, to March 12, 1918. It was finally designated as "Services of Supply" on March 13, 1918. Its headquarters was in Tours, France. The SOS consisted of base sections, which provided seaport and receiving services; an intermediate section, which provided storage and services; and an advanced section, which also stored supplies and issued them to line forces. The SOS remained in operation until July 19, 1919; some of its sections were transferred to American Forces in France and American Forces in Germany

On September 7, 1917, General John J. Pershing, the AEF's commander, directed that a ninety-day reserve of all classes of supplies be maintained by monthly shipments to reduce the impact of possible German submarine attacks. The goal was to have reserves stockpiled as follows in the established sections (see below):

- Forty-five days near ports in the base sections.
- Thirty days in the Intermediate Section.
- Fifteen days in the Advance Section.

=== Commanders ===
Commanders of the S. O. S. were:

- Colonel David S. Stanley (interim), July 5–24, 1917
- Brigadier General (later Major General) Richard M. Blatchford, July 25 – November 1, 1917
- Brigadier General Mason M. Patrick (interim), November 2–27, 1917
- Major General Francis J. Kernan, November 28, 1917 – July 28, 1918
- Major General James G. Harbord, July 29, 1918 – May 26, 1919
- Brigadier General William D. Connor, May 27 – August 31, 1919

=== Sections ===
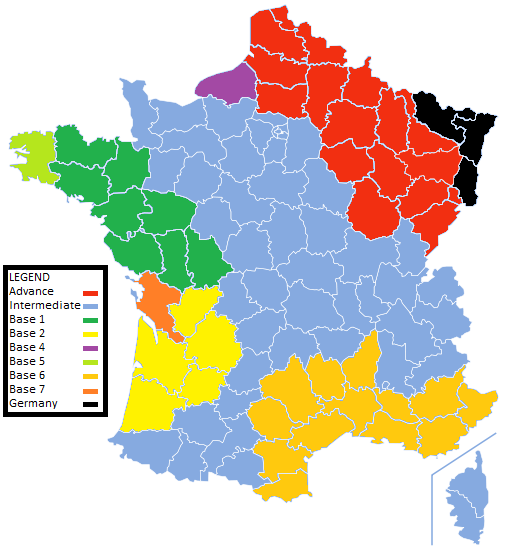
Sections of the S. O. S. in France

Sections were area commands primarily located in France, but also in Italy, England, and Belgium.

==== Advance Section ====
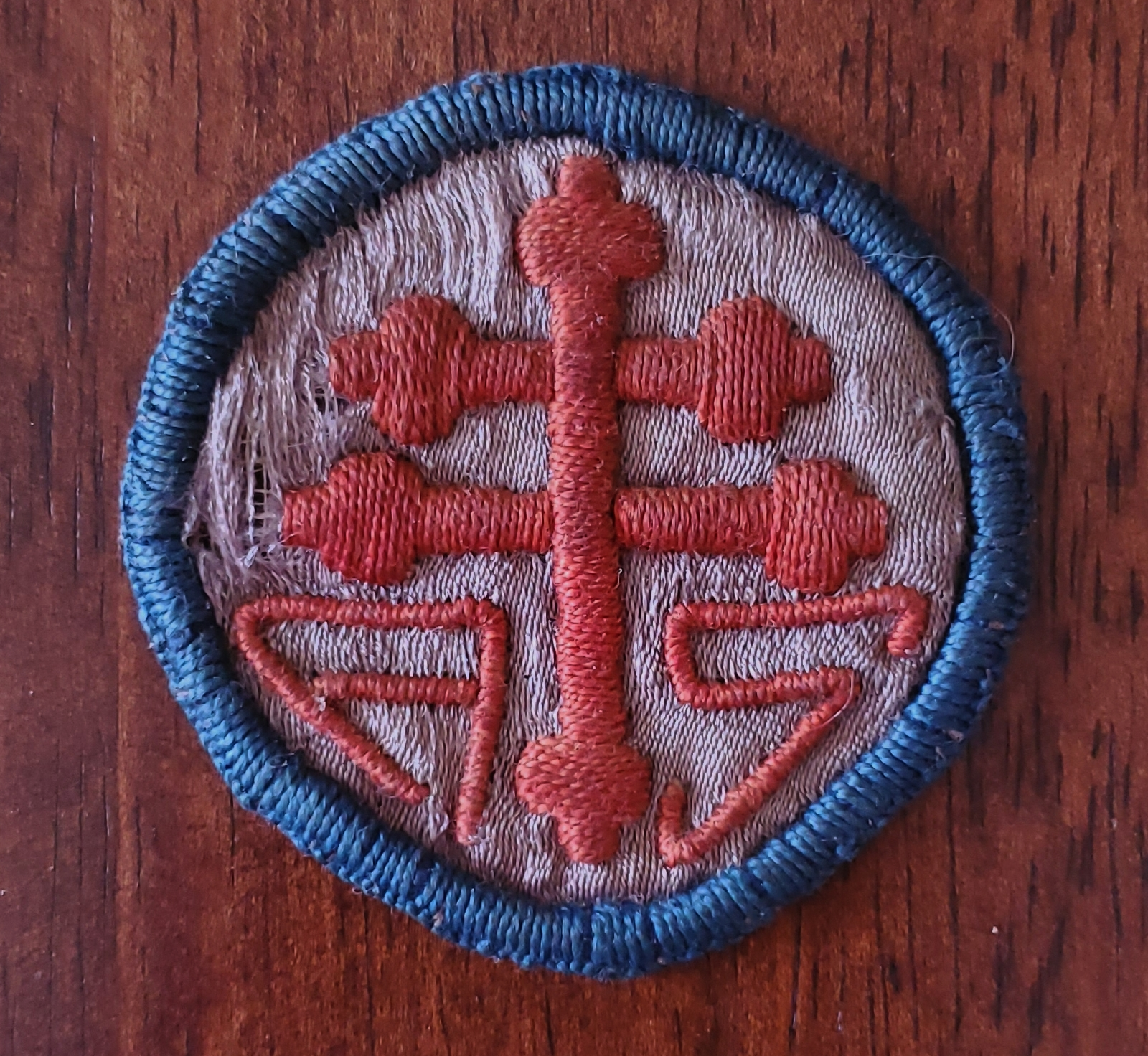
Advance Section Services of Supply Patch

Initially commanded by John F. Madden, the Advance Section, headquartered at Neufchâteau, France, distributed supplies to the zone of operations. After U.S. units entered combat, depots in the Advance Section made up railroad trains which moved the supplies to division railheads; from there on, supplies were the responsibility of the divisions. Advance Section area included the French Departments of Nord, Pas-de-Calais, Somme, Oise, Aisne, Ardennes, Marne, Aube, Meurthe-et-Moselle, Meuse, Haute-Marne, Cote d'Or, Vosges, Haute-Saône, and Doubs and the Territoire de Belfort.

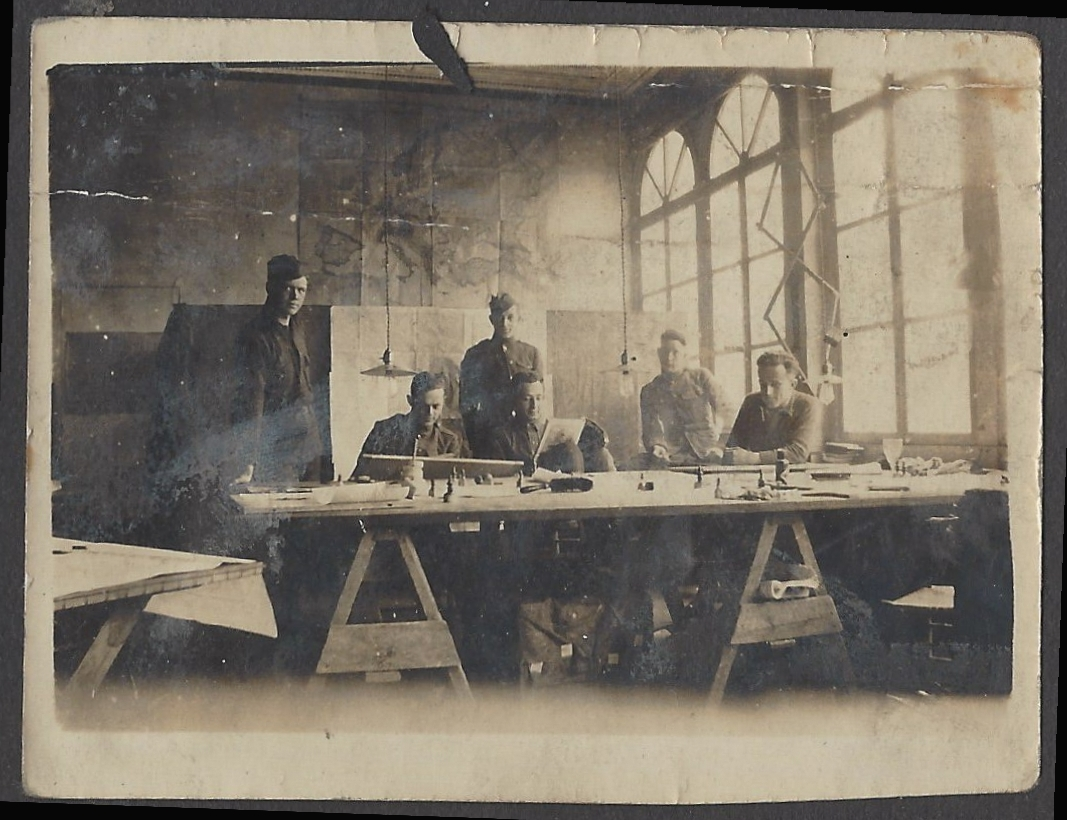
Mapping Unit, Advance Section Headquarters, Neufchateu-Vosges, France 1919

==== Intermediate Section ====
The Intermediate Section, headquartered at Nevers, France; its territory covered all of France not included in the Advance Section or in any of the base sections. This section stored and classified supplies. Among the commanders were Colonel (later Brigadier General) Arthur Johnson, Brigadier General Charles Gerhardt, and Major General William H. Hay.

==== Base Section Number 1 ====
Base Section Number 1 was established on August 13, 1917, with headquarters in St-Nazaire, France. Its area comprised the French Departments of Morbihan, Côtes-du-Nord, Ille-et-Vilaine, Loire-Inférieure, Maine-et-Loire, Vendée, Deux-Sèvres, and Vienne. Base Section Number 1 was discontinued on October 20, 1919; its personnel and units were assigned to American Forces in France. Troops and cargo moved through the ports in this section. Base Section Number 1 used St-Nazaire, Nantes, and Les Sables-d'Olonne as its ports, which handled troops and cargo. Approximately 200,000 soldiers entered France through the two ports and cargo handling reached 350,000 tons a month in October 1918. Its activities included training for engineer officers, artillery, and aerial observation. It had hospitals able to handle 35,000 sick and wounded. Among the commanders were Colonel (later Major General) Louis H. Bash, Brigadier General Charles A. Doyen (U.S. Marine Corps), Brigadier General Robert D. Walsh, Colonel (later Major General) Ulysses G. McAlexander, Brigadier General Samuel D. Rockenbach, and Colonel (later Brigadier General) Casper H. Conrad Jr.

==== Base Section Number 2 ====
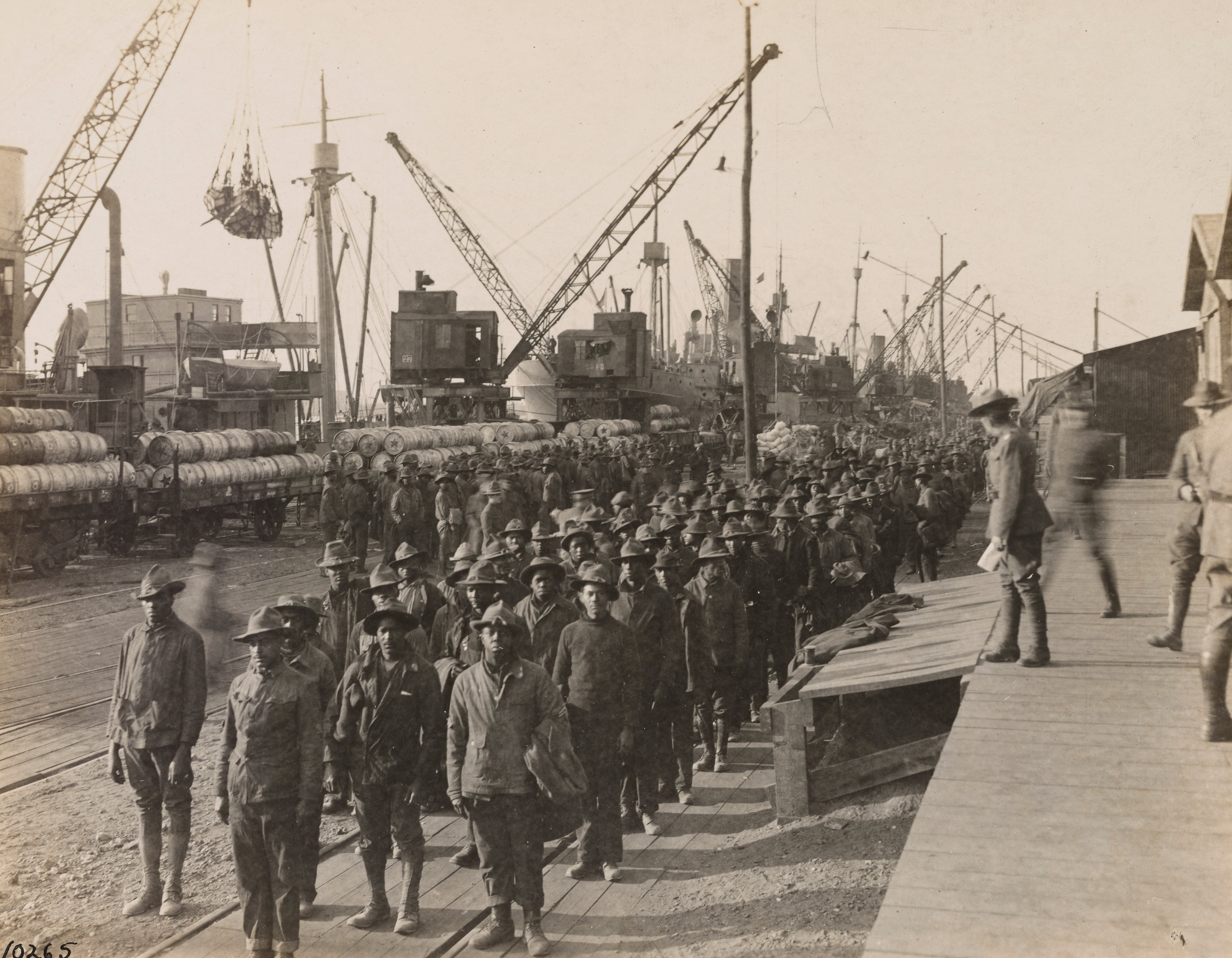
Night shift ready for work, Bassens Docks, Bordeaux, April 1918.

Base Section Number 2 was established on August 13, 1917. This base section, headquartered at Bordeaux, France, included the French Departments of Charente-Inferieure, Gironde, Landes, Lot-et-Garonne, Dordogne, and Charente. Section 2 processed more than 50,000 incoming personnel and 25% of all cargo that entered France for the American Expeditionary Forces. Base Section Number 2 was discontinued on September 30, 1919; its personnel and units were assigned to American Forces in France. Its base port was at Bordeaux. Commanders included Brigadier General Charles H. Cole, Brigadier General William S. Scott, Brigadier General William D. Connor, Brigadier General Robert D. Walsh, and Major General Charles D. Rhodes.

==== Base Section Number 3 ====
Base Section Number 3 was established on November 27, 1917, with headquarters in London, England by separating it from Base Section Number 4. Base Section Number 3 was discontinued on June 15, 1919; its personnel and units were assigned to Headquarters, Services of Supply. Troops being deployed to France through England typically debarked at Liverpool, were transported by rail to the British coast on the English Channel, and embarked at Southampton and Dover for transportation to Le Havre, Cherbourg, and Calais. All U.S. personnel in England are under the command of this station. The Murmansk Expedition was deployed through Base Section Number 3. Commanders included Major General George T. Bartlett, Major General John Biddle (three times), and Brigadier General Charles B. Wheeler

==== Base Section Number 4 ====
Base Section Number 4 was established as Base Section Number 3 on August 13, 1917, in Le Havre, France. Its territory was the French Department of Seine-Inferieure with a subordinate element in England. It was re-designated as Base Section Number 4 on November 27, 1917, when the element in England was detached and designated as Base Section Number 3. The section's port was Le Havre; that port was the first to receive U.S. troops. Between establishment and the Armistice, 700,000 tons of materiel were received and shipped onward. Commanders included Brigadier General William Lassiter, Brigadier General Richard Coulter Jr., and Brigadier General John B. Bennett Base Section Number 4 was discontinued on April 20, 1919; its personnel and units were assigned to the Intermediate Section.

==== Base Section Number 5 ====
Base Section Number 5 was established on November 27, 1917, with headquarters in Brest, France, comprised the French Department of Finistère. The section's ports were at Brest (the only deep water port available to the U.S.) and Cherbourg. The ports could handle over 6,000 tons daily and more than 30,000 troops in 12 hours. Through the port at Brest, Section Number 5 was the major path to repatriation for U.S. troops. On December 31, 1919, Base Section No 5 was discontinued as a port of embarkation. Among the commanders were Colonel (later Brigadier General) Nathaniel F. McClure, Brigadier General George H. Harries, Major General Eli A. Helmick, and Colonel (later Brigadier General) Asa L. Singleton.

==== Base Section Number 6 ====
Base Section Number 6 was established on June 28, 1918, with headquarters in Marseille (Bouches-du-Rhône), France. The section's territory covered the French Departments of Bouches-du-Rhone, Var, Alpes-Maritimes, Basses-Alpes, Vaucluse, Ardèche, Lozère, Aveyron, Tarn, Aude, Pyrenees-Orientales, Herault, and Gard. The section's two ports were at Marseille and Toulon. The ports primarily processed freight and could handle 3000 tons daily. Base Section Number 6 was discontinued on June 15, 1919; its personnel and units were assigned to the Intermediate Section.The section's only two commanders were Colonels Melvin W. Rowell and George McDougall Weeks.

==== Base Section Number 7 ====
Base Section Number 7 was established on June 28, 1918, with headquarters in La Pallice, France in the French Department of Charente-Inferieure, which was the only department in the base section and had previously been a part of Base Section No 2. It had ports at La Pallice, Rochefort-sur-Mer, and Marans. It received and forwarded almost 1,500,000 tons of cargo during 1917 and 1918. Base Section Number 7 was discontinued on April 25, 1919; its personnel and units were assigned to Base Section Number 2. Commanders included Brigadier General Charles Gerhardt

==== Base Section Number 8 ====
Base Section Number 8 was established on November 4, 1918, with headquarters and only port in Padua, Italy. The base section provided administrative control of all U.S. troops in Italy, including the 332nd Infantry Regiment. Base Section Number 8 was discontinued on May 20, 1919; its personnel and units were assigned to Headquarters, Services of Supply. Brigadier General (later Major General) Charles G. Treat was its only commander.

==== Base Section Number 9 ====
Base Section Number 9 was established on April 8, 1919, with headquarters and sole port in Antwerp, Belgium. The section supported the forces occupying Germany. On August 15, 1919, the section was transferred to American Forces in Germany. Its two commanders were Colonels John B. Sewell and William Kelly.

=== Independent districts ===
The District of Paris and the Arrondissement of Tours, although lying within the Intermediate Section, were exempted from the control of that section and directly administered by Headquarters, Services of Supply.

== Subordinate elements ==
=== Army Service Corps ===
On August 22, 1918, the Army Service Corps was established to operate units in the Services of Supply. Eventually, more than 400 organizations would fall under the control of the Army Service Corps, including:

- Headquarters Battalion, S. O. S.
- Headquarters Detachment, Renting, Requisition, and Claims (RR&C) Service, and RR&C companies
- Cement mills companies
- Headquarters Detachment, Central Prisoners of War Enclosure and prisoners of war escort companies
  - 236th Prisoner of War Escort Company
- Administrative labor companies
- The Labor Bureau
- The War Risk Section
- Graves registration units
- Fire trucks and hose companies

=== Transportation Corps ===
- Stevedore operations, American Expeditionary Forces
- Railway operations, American Expeditionary Forces

== Units ==
No one source document seems to list all the units of the Services of Supply. This list is incomplete.

- 332nd Butchery Company
- 363rd Butchery Company
- 301st Stevedore Regiment
- 302nd Stevedore Regiment
- 303rd Stevedore Regiment
- 701st Stevedore Battalion
- 702nd Stevedore Battalion
- Engineer Service Battalions, numbered from 505th to 550th, inclusive.
- Labor Battalions, numbered from 304th to 348th, inclusive (excluding the 316th, 327th and 328th) and the 357th.
- Labor Companies, numbered from 301st to 324th, inclusive.
- Pioneer Infantry Battalions numbered 80lth to 809th, as well as the 811th and 813th to 816th, inclusive.

Also there were 207 US Army labor battalions in France during the war, but nothing is known of their designations.

== Deployment of stevedore units ==
- Intermediate Section: One company
- Base Section Number 1: Six battalions
- Base Section Number 2: Five battalions
- Base Section Number 3: One detachment
- Base Section Number 4: One company
- Base Section Number 5: Two battalions
- Base Section Number 6: One battalion (less two companies)
- Base Section Number 7: Elements of two battalions

== See also ==
- Charles G. Dawes, in overall command of logistics
- Military Board of Allied Supply (MBAS) the coordinating unit for all the Allied armies on the Western and Italian fronts
