= Francis Joseph Kernan =

United States Army general

Francis J. Kernan
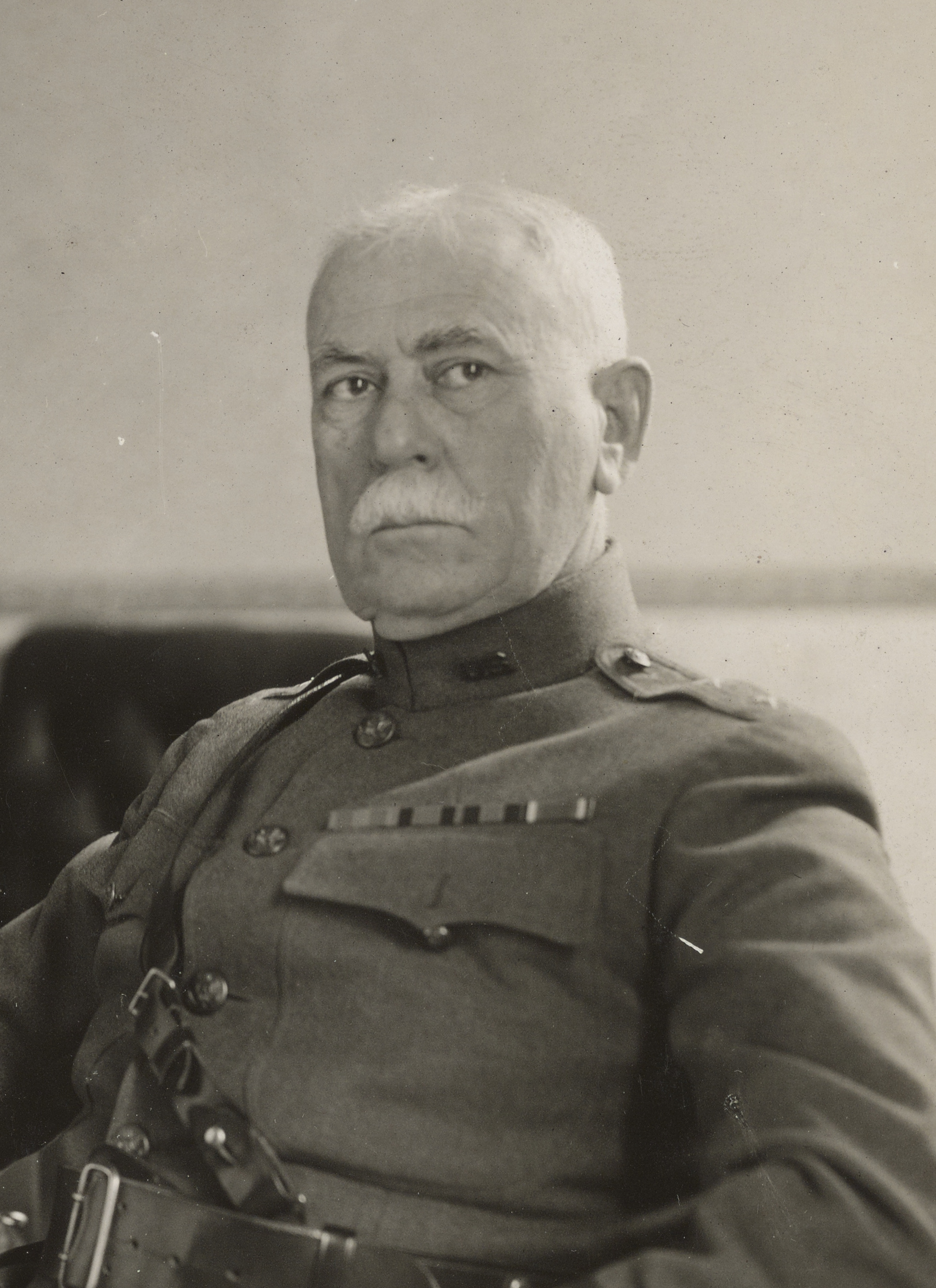
- Born: 19 October 1859; Jacksonville, Florida, U.S.
- Died: 3 February 1945 (aged 85); Daytona Beach, Florida, U.S.
- Burial place: Arlington National Cemetery
- Military career
- Allegiance: United States
- Branch: United States Army
- Service years: 1881–1922
- Rank: Major General
- Service number: 0-19
- Commands: Services of Supply, American Expeditionary Forces
- Conflicts: Philippine–American War; World War I
- Awards: Silver Star (Citation Star); Army Distinguished Service Medal

Major General Francis Joseph Kernan (19 October 1859 – 3 February 1945) was a United States Army officer who participated in the Philippine–American War and later served as a general officer in World War I where he commanded the Services of Supply, American Expeditionary Forces from 1917 to 1918.

== Education ==
Francis Kernan was born in 1859 in Jacksonville, Florida on 19 October 1859 as son of John A. and Elizabeth C. Kernan. He entered the United States Military Academy in 1877 and graduated 18th in a class of 53 in 1881. Among his classmates were several men who would attain the rank of general officer, such as John Frank Morrison, Joseph T. Dickman, Enoch Crowder, Edwin St. John Greble, Charles H. Barth, Clarence Page Townsley, Charles L. Phillips, George True Bartlett, Joseph Alfred Gaston, Henry Clay Hodges Jr. and John Biddle.

== Military career ==
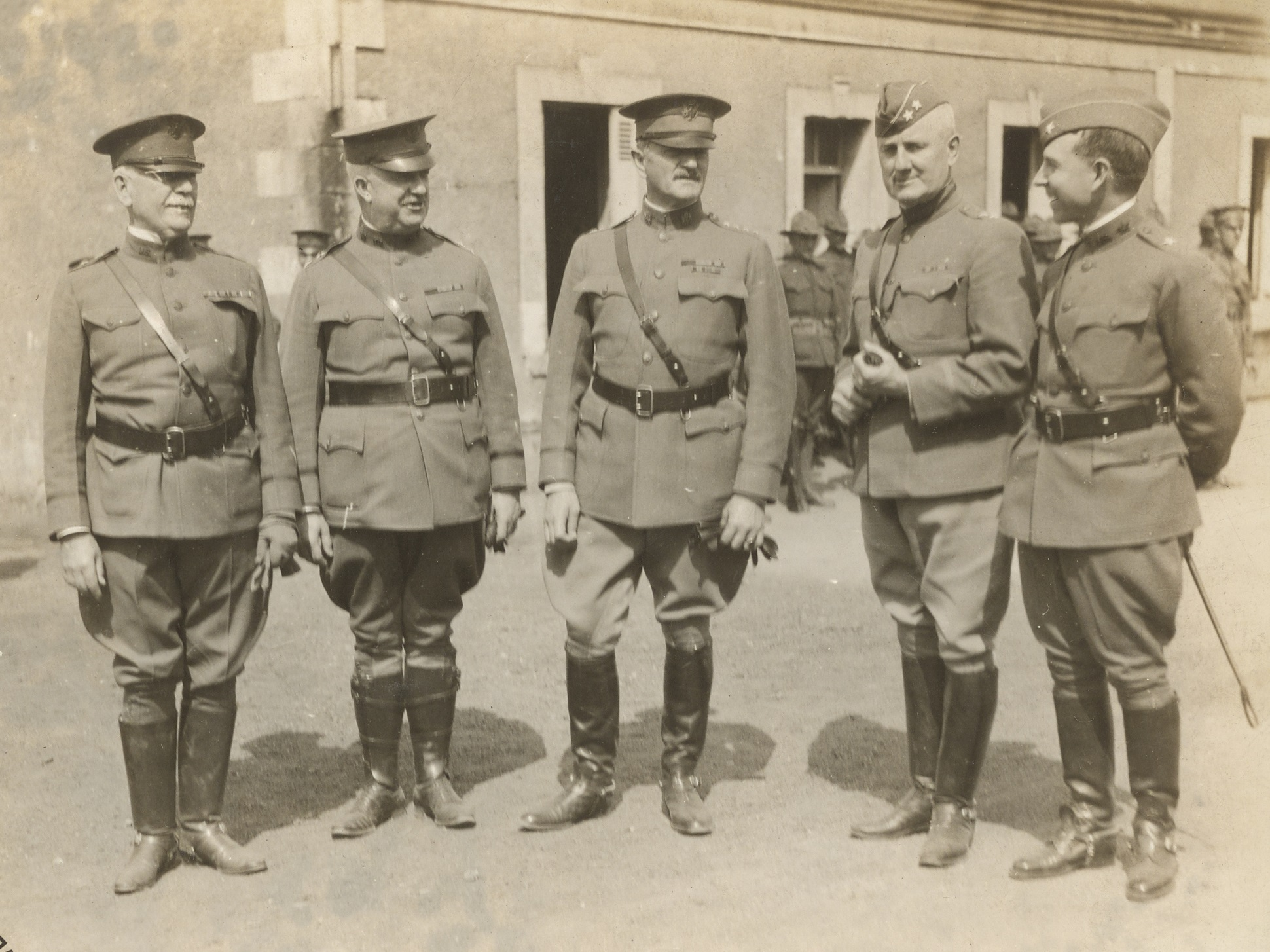
From left to right: Major General Francis J. Kernan, Major General James W. McAndrew, General John J. Pershing, Major General James Harbord and Brigadier General Johnson Hagood in Tours, France, July 1918.

After his graduation he was stationed at Fort Canby, Fort Klamath and Fort Sidney, before going back to West Point in 1888 to work as an instructor in Law and History until 1891. Kernan became judge advocate in the departments for Dakota and later Texas until 1896.

During the Spanish–American War, Francis Kernan became a member of General Arthur MacArthurs staff on his tour to the Philippine Islands in 1898, where he earned a Silver Star citation for gallantry. After the Philippines he took over duties in the Judge Advocate Generals office and later on Cuba.

Kernan went back to the Philippine Islands to serve under MacArthur from 1900 to 1903. Now a major, he was appointed member of the General Staff Corps in Washington D.C. in 1906. Following his staff duties, he served for a short time in the Philippines again at Fort William McKinley, commanding a regiment. After this he attended the United States Army War College, from where he graduated in 1914.

In 1917, the year of the American entry into World War I, Kernan became a brigadier general and when the United States planned to join World War I, Kernan, to his own statement, was asked to formulate the official instructions for the Commander-in-Chief (C-in-C) of the American Expeditionary Forces (AEF) in France, General John J. Pershing.

Now a major general of the National Army, he arrived in France in September 1917 where he took over command of the Service of Supply section, after Major General Richard M. Blatchford had failed to organize a functioning line of communication and was replaced on Pershings' order. Kernan kept the position until July 1918, but he also failed to organize an adequate delivery of supplies and was replaced by Major General James Harbord.

Kernan was sent on a diplomatic mission, to negotiate with German envoys in Switzerland to reach an agreement concerning treatment and exchange of prisoners of war. After the Armistice of 11 November 1918 he became an advisor to the American Commission to Negotiate Peace in late 1918. For his services in the war he was awarded the Army Distinguished Service Medal, the citation for which reads:

The President of the United States of America, authorized by Act of Congress, July 9, 1918, takes pleasure in presenting the Army Distinguished Service Medal to Major General Francis Joseph Kernan, United States Army, for exceptionally meritorious and distinguished services to the Government of the United States, in a duty of great responsibility during World War I. General Kernan was entrusted with the important duty of organizing the Services of Supply of the American Expeditionary Forces in France, and the foundation then laid was later successfully carried out to completion. As a member of the War Prisoners' Commission, Berne, Switzerland, and of the American Section of the Supreme War Council, he has rendered conspicuous services to the Government.

Kernan became a major general of the regular Army in October 1919 and was sent to the Philippine Islands again until late 1922, when he briefly commanded the Seventh Corps Area before requesting to be retired.

== Personal life and death ==
Francis Kernan married Ella M. McCaffrey. The couple had four children. He died in Daytona Beach, Florida on 3 February 1945. He was buried at Arlington National Cemetery.

== Bibliography ==
- Cooke, James J. (1997). Pershing and his Generals: Command and Staff in the AEF. Praeger Publishers. ISBN 0-275-95363-7.
- Davis, Henry Blaine Jr. (1998). Generals in Khaki. Raleigh, North Carolina: Pentland Press. ISBN 1571970886. OCLC 40298151.
- Lacey, Jim (2009). Pershing: A Biography: Lessons in Leadership. St. Martin's Publishing Group. ISBN 978-0230614451.

Military offices
Preceded by Omar Bundy	Commanding General Seventh Corps Area; May−September 1922	Succeeded by George B. Duncan
