= Stevedore operations, American Expeditionary Forces =

Stevedore element of the American Expeditionary Forces during World War I

Stevedore operations
- Part of Services of Supply (S.O.S.)
- SOS shoulder insignia
- Operational scope: Base sections, S.O.S.
- Type: Quartermaster/Transportation
- Planned by: Quartermaster Corps
- Commanded by: Services of Supply
- Date: November 1917

Stevedore operations were established by the United States Army to provide movement of supplies through ports in support of the American Expeditionary Forces during World War I. The first American stevedores in France were civilians. Stevedores were originally organized into regiments, and were among the first troops sent to France. Three regiments and two separate battalions were deployed, and were later reorganized into separate battalions and transferred from the Army Service Corps to the Transportation Corps. The battalions were inactivated in France and the troops were assigned to companies without a branch affiliation for their return to the U.S.

== Organization ==
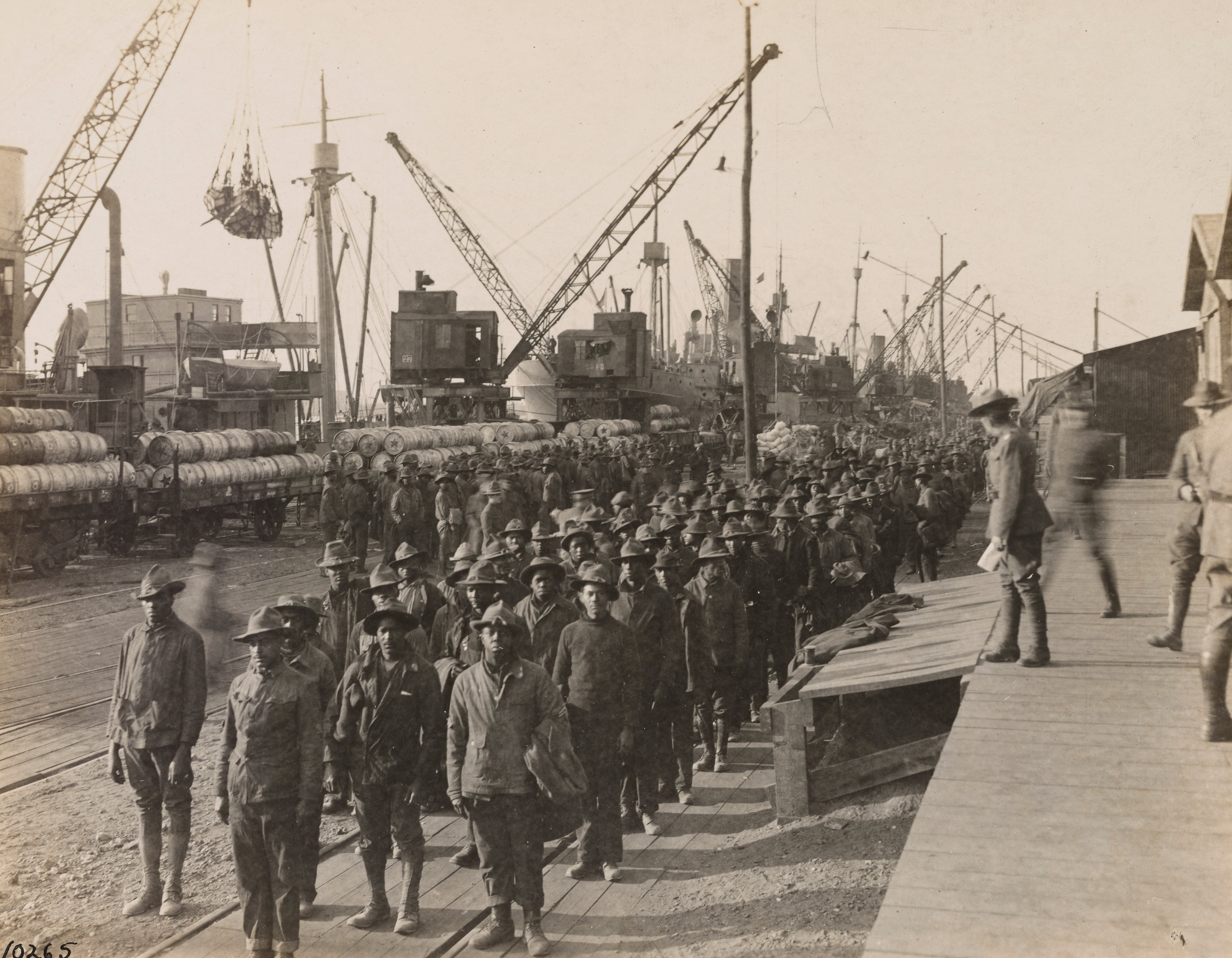
Night shift ready for work, Bassens Docks, Bordeaux, April 1918.

Stevedore operation began with a group of nearly 500 civilian stevedores known as the transport workers battalion. This group was found to be less than well qualified because most were laborers from cotton plantations in the American South, rather than being stevedores with experience handling cargo. Stevedore regiments were organized by the Stevedore and Labor Branch, Administrative Division, Quartermaster Corps, originally managed by Colonel William G. Austin and later by Colonel Carey E. Goodwyn. The 301st, 302nd and 303rd regiments were described by Henry Granville Sharpe as each having an authorized strength of 127 Officers, 858 Enlisted Men (White), and 6121 Enlisted Men (Colored). Conversely, Robert J. Dalessandro, Gerald Torrence, and Michael G. Knapp wrote "A stevedore regiment had an aggregate strength of 2,498. It consisted of a regimental headquarters, headquarters and supply company, two battalions, and a medical detachment. Each battalion consisted of four companies; each company consisted of 253 soldiers (three officers and 250 enlisted men)." Cadre for the regiments was drawn from the Regular Army.

The Army advertised for Colored men to enlist as stevedores. Married men who agreed to support their families and who were otherwise qualified were acceptable. Recruits were to be sent to Newport News, Virginia without benefit of being issued uniforms. Many African Americans applied to join the Army on the front lines but were often turned away, as positions in black fighting regiments were limited and in the regular army only cooks and bakers with credentials were accepted, while only chauffeurs and automobile men were accepted in the medical department or quartermaster's corps, making stevedore positions desirable. By June 1918, the Army was seeking White men for the stevedore service. Men "accustomed to handling colored labor" were preferred; potential enlistees were required to present a letter of acceptance from the commander of the stevedore regiment to enlist. The Army Medical Department subsequently observed that the quality of the recruits was below standard. "Few had had much education, and as a group they were regarded as 'ignorant negroes of the poorest class, both physically and mentally.' They were in questionable health from the outset, no physical examinations having been administered at mobilization camps to weed out those who were ill or in any other way unfit for service." New troops often reported without warning, wearing little more than rags because they had been incorrectly told the Army would issue uniforms when they arrived. Stevedores were described in December 1917 as wearing a variety of uniforms from different branches of the Army or, in some cases, blue dungaree suits and as being unarmed.

By December 14, 1917, there were five stevedore regiments operating at Newport News, Virginia. The stevedores were described as being "happy as larks." The presence of the African American stevedore regiments in Newport News led to the construction of a YMCA at Camp Hill for the use of African-American soldiers in the winter of 1918. There were problems integrating the Colored stevedores into the Army. In early March 1918, approximately 300 troops of an unidentified stevedore regiment rioted and attempted to wreck a store north of Newport News, Virginia. The riot followed an argument between a Colored soldier and a White clerk at a soda fountain. Troops of an infantry regiment were ordered to arrest the stevedores, who ran and failed to halt when so ordered. The infantrymen fired and hit three stevedores; one died at the scene and another's wounds were probably fatal.

After stevedores had deployed to France, they were unsuited for the work because they had substandard clothing and had been poorly fed and had had poor medical care; these conditions required remediation before the men could work. Stevedores were used in some cases in the interior instead of at ports. There was some indecision about assigning them to the Army Service Corps, which was labor oriented, or to the Transportation Corps, which was oriented toward moving equipment. There were serious disagreements about administration, funding, discipline, allocation of supplies, and allocation of promotions. The Transportation Corps won the argument and the stevedores, along with railway units were transferred out of the Army Service Corps.

== Units ==
Stevedores were originally organized into regiments. This was found to lack flexibility because of varying demands at ports and they were reorganized into battalions. Individual companies had and authorized strength of 200 men until the spring of 1918 when they were reorganized to a strength of six officers and 250 men; the reorganization provided for enough non-commissioned officers and White enlisted men to provide supervision for the Colored soldiers.

=== 301st Stevedore Regiment ===
The 301st Stevedore Regiment (Quartermaster Corps) was organized at Camp Hill, Virginia in September 1917. In October 1917 the regiment moved to the port of Embarkation in Hoboken, New Jersey. The 301st Stevedore Regiment was transferred to the Transportation Corps in September 1918.

In October 1918, A Company of the 301st was cited by Rear Admiral Wilson and General McClure for setting a record by unloading and coaling the SS Leviathan in 56 hours.

=== 302nd Stevedore Regiment ===
The 302nd Stevedore Regiment (Quartermaster Corps) was organized at Camp Hill, Virginia in October 1917. Colonel W. G. Austin was assigned to command the regiment. In December 1917 the regiment moved to the port of Embarkation in Hoboken, New Jersey. The 302nd Stevedore Regiment was transferred to the Transportation Corps in September 1918.

=== 303rd Stevedore Regiment ===
The 303rd Stevedore Regiment (Quartermaster Corps) was organized at Camp Hill, Virginia in October 1917. Colonel C. E. Goodwin was placed in command of the regiment. In December 1917 the regiment moved to the port of Embarkation in Hoboken, New Jersey. The 303rd Stevedore Regiment was transferred to the Transportation Corps in September 1918.

=== 304th Stevedore Regiment ===
The 304th Stevedore Regiment ( also known as the 304th Training Regiment) was organized at Camp Hill, Virginia in October 1917. The regiment had an authorized strength of 59 Officers, 286 Enlisted Men (White), and 2469 Enlisted Men (Colored). Colonel M. J. O'Leary was assigned as commander of the 304th. The regiment was demobilized in February 1918 at Camp Hill.

=== 305th Reserve Stevedore Regiment ===
The 305th Reserve Stevedore Regiment, Newport News, Virginia, had an authorized strength of 76 officers, 3556 Enlisted Men (White), and no Enlisted Men (Colored). In January 1918, Colonel Charles L. Dulin was ordered to assume command of the 305th.

=== Stevedore battalions ===
- 701st Engineer Battalion (Stevedores) was organized at Camp Alexander, Virginia in September 1918 and moved to the port of embarkation at Newport News, Virginia in October 1918. It was converted to a Transportation Corps unit in December 1918.
- 702nd Engineer Battalion (Stevedores) was organized at Camp Alexander, Virginia in October 1918 and moved to the port of embarkation at Newport News, Virginia in November 1918. It was converted to a Transportation Corps unit in December 1918.
- A provision existed for the 1st through 800th Stevedore Battalions, but these units were not organized.
- The 801st through the 815th Stevedore Battalions (Transportation Corps) were organized from the 301st through the 303rd Stevedore Regiments (Date of authorization: September 16, 1918). Which regiments were sources of which battalions varies by reference.

=== Other units ===
- Service Battalion Number 336 was organized at Camp Hill, Virginia in May 1918. It departed to the port of embarkation at Newport News, Virginia in June 1918, arriving in France the same month. It was absorbed into the 301st Stevedore Battalion (sic) in August 1918.
- Service Battalion Number 337 was organized at Camp Hill, Virginia in May 1918. It departed to the port of embarkation at Newport News, Virginia in June 1918, arriving in France the same month. It was absorbed into the 301st Stevedore Battalion (sic) in July 1918.

== Operations ==
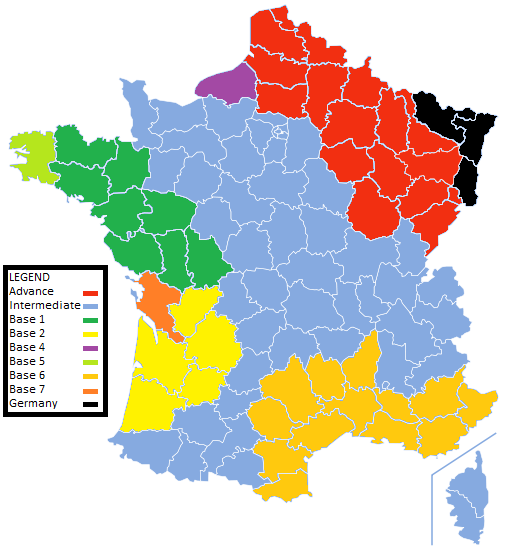
Sections of the SOS in France

Stevedores unloaded supplies at American port facilities established in Brest, St. Nazaire, Bordeaux, Havre, and Marseilles (all in France). "Negro" stevedores were praised for the speed with which they offloaded troops and supplies.
