= James Harbord =

United States Army general (1866–1947)

James G. Harbord
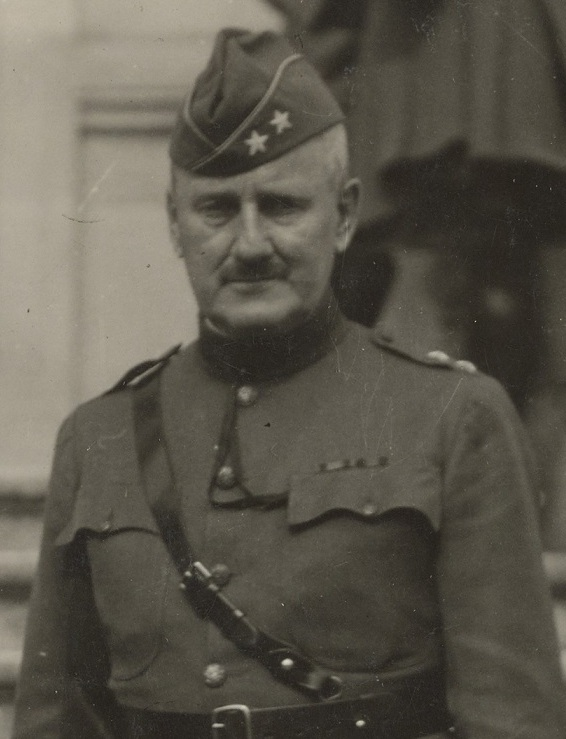
- Harbord, pictured here in France in October 1918 when he was a major general
- Born: James Guthrie Harbord; March 21, 1866; Bloomington, Illinois, U.S.
- Died: August 20, 1947 (aged 81); Rye, New York, U.S.
- Alma mater: Kansas State University (BS, MS)
- Military career
- Allegiance: United States
- Branch: United States Army
- Service years: 1889–1922
- Rank: Lieutenant General
- Service number: 0-18
- Unit: Cavalry Branch
- Commands: 4th Marine Brigade; 2nd Division; Services of Supply, American Expeditionary Forces
- Conflicts: Spanish–American War; Philippine–American War; Mexican Border War; World War I
- Awards: Army Distinguished Service Medal; Navy Distinguished Service Medal

James Guthrie Harbord (March 21, 1866 – August 20, 1947) was a senior officer of the United States Army and president and chairman of the board of RCA. During World War I, he served from mid-1917 to mid-1918 as chief of staff of the American Expeditionary Forces (AEF), commanded by General John J. Pershing, before commanding a brigade and briefly a division and then the AEF Services of Supply. In the former role he was, in the words of former soldier-turned historian David T. Zabecki,

The U.S. Army's first modern operational-level chief of staff in a combat theater, and he would be the model for all others who followed. He played a key role in developing the staff structure and organization used throughout the U.S. military to this day, as well as by most NATO countries. He was one of the most influential U.S. Army officers of the early 20th century.

== Early life ==
Harbord was born on March 21, 1866, in Bloomington, Illinois, the son of George W. and Effie (Gault) Harbord. His family moved when he was four, and Harbord was raised in Pettis County, Missouri and Lyon County, Kansas. He graduated from Kansas State Agricultural College, later renamed Kansas State University, with a Bachelor of Science degree in 1886. After unsuccessfully applying to the United States Military Academy (USMA) at West Point, New York, Harbord taught school, and afterwards taught at the agricultural college. In January 1889, Harbord enlisted in the United States Army, joining the 4th Infantry Regiment as a private. He served in the enlisted ranks at Fort Spokane, Washington and Fort Sherman, Idaho until July 31, 1891, and advanced to corporal, sergeant, and regimental quartermaster sergeant. In August 1891, Harbord applied for a commission and was one of several non-commissioned officers selected to take a competitive examination. He finished first of the 12 successful candidates and received appointment as a second lieutenant in the 5th Cavalry Regiment, with which he served first at Fort Reno, Oklahoma, and later at Fort Leavenworth, Kansas. He received a Master of Science degree from Kansas State Agricultural College in 1895.

== Start of military career ==
Harbord's first overseas experience came as a member of the occupation army in Cuba after the Spanish–American War. On January 21, 1899, during an extended leave, he married Emma Yeatman Overshine, daughter of Brigadier General Samuel Ovenshine. In 1901, he was promoted to captain and transferred from Cuba, where he has served initially as quartermaster and commissary for the 10th Cavalry Regiment, and later as aide-de-camp and adjutant-general of the department of Santiago and Puerto Principe.

After serving briefly in the Secretary of War office, he requested and received transfer to duty in the Philippines with the 11th Cavalry Regiment. He then served as Assistant Chief of the Philippine Constabulary from 1903 to 1909 and again from 1910 through 1913. By late April 1914 he was commanding the unit defending the California border at Calexico. In 1916, he was on the Mexican border with Brigadier General John J. Pershing, pursuing Pancho Villa.

== World War I ==
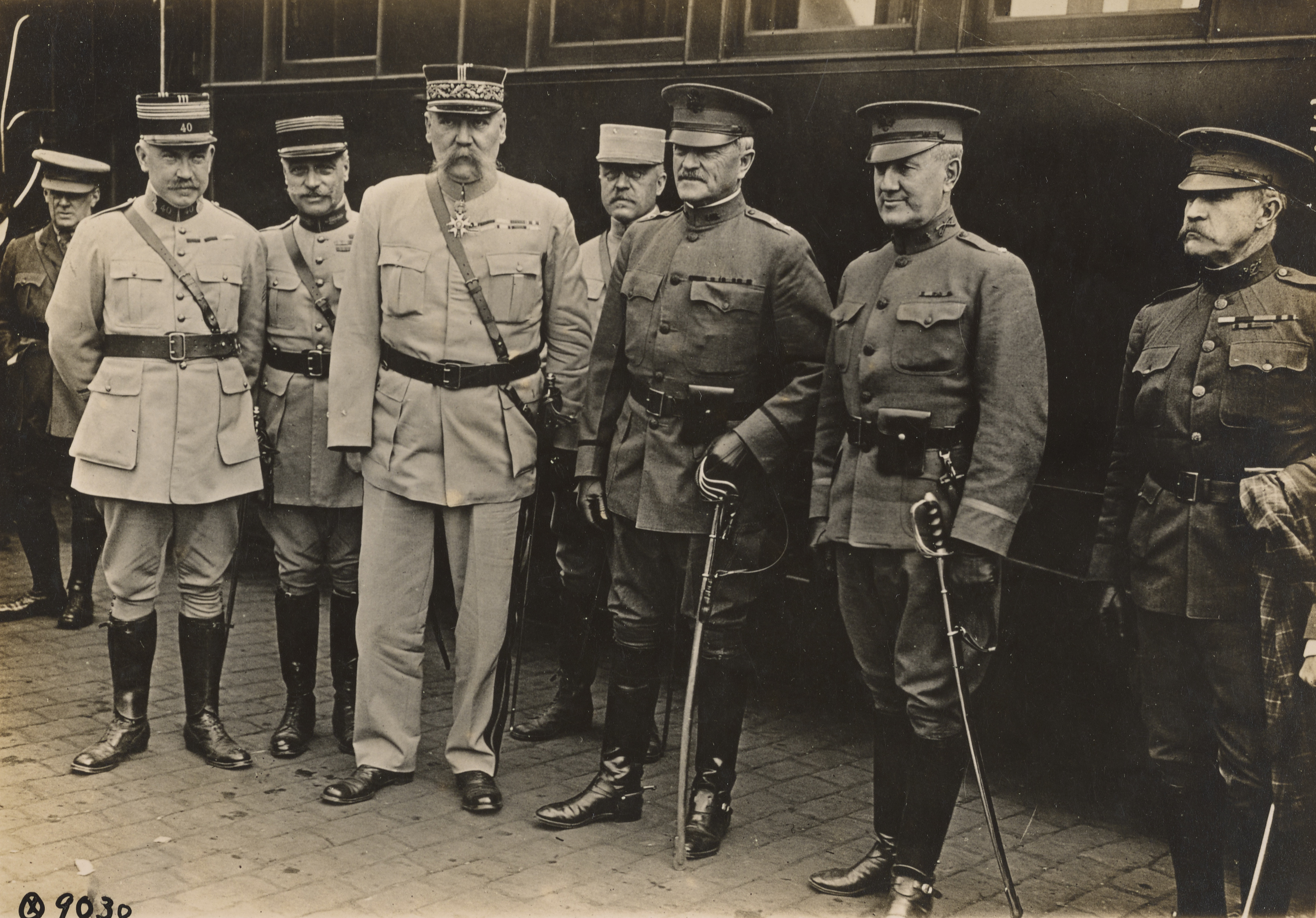
Arrival in France of Major General Pershing and Lieutenant Colonel James Harbord, with General Peter Peltier of the French Army stood to Pershing's right, France, June 13, 1917

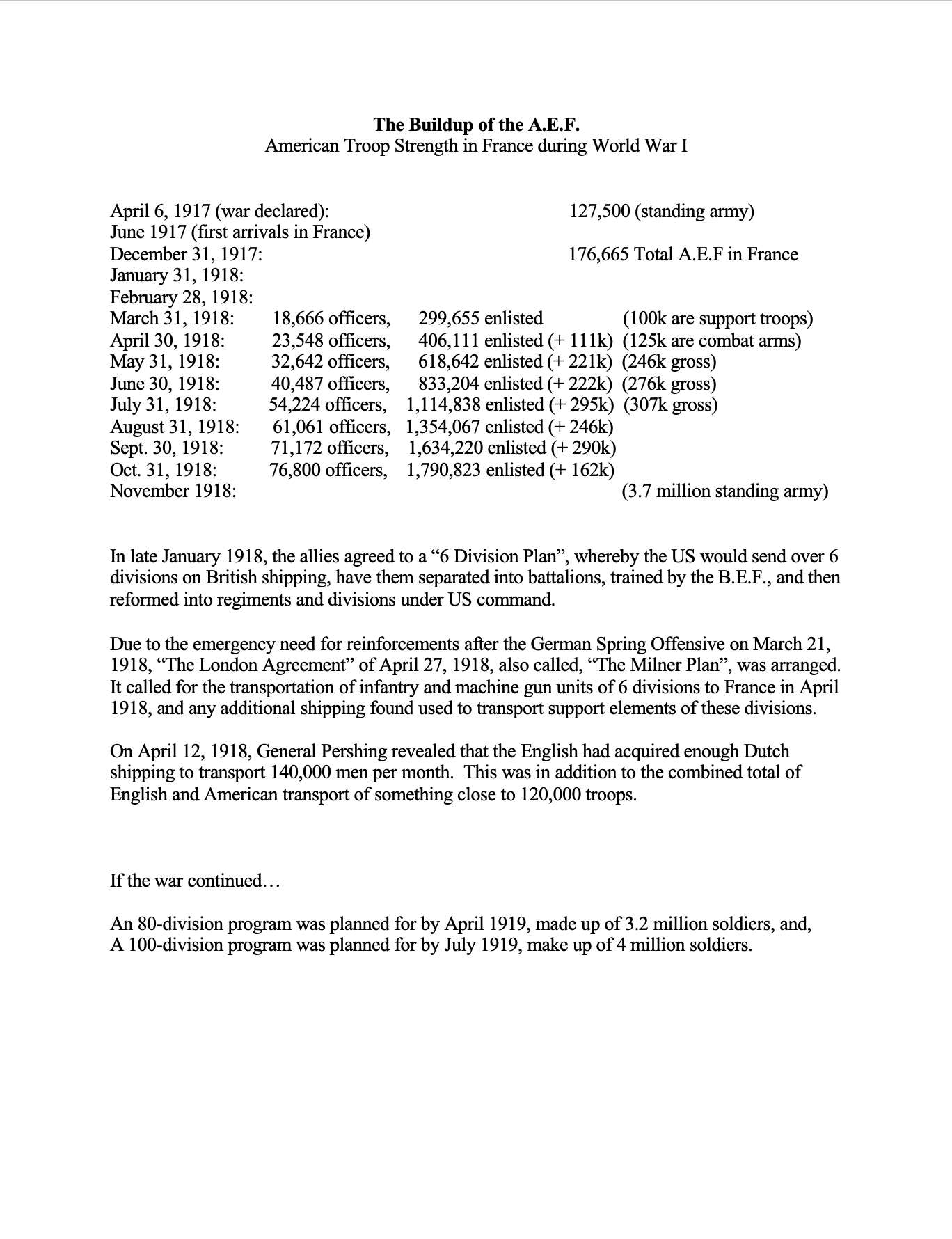
The buildup of the AEF in France

=== Staff officer ===
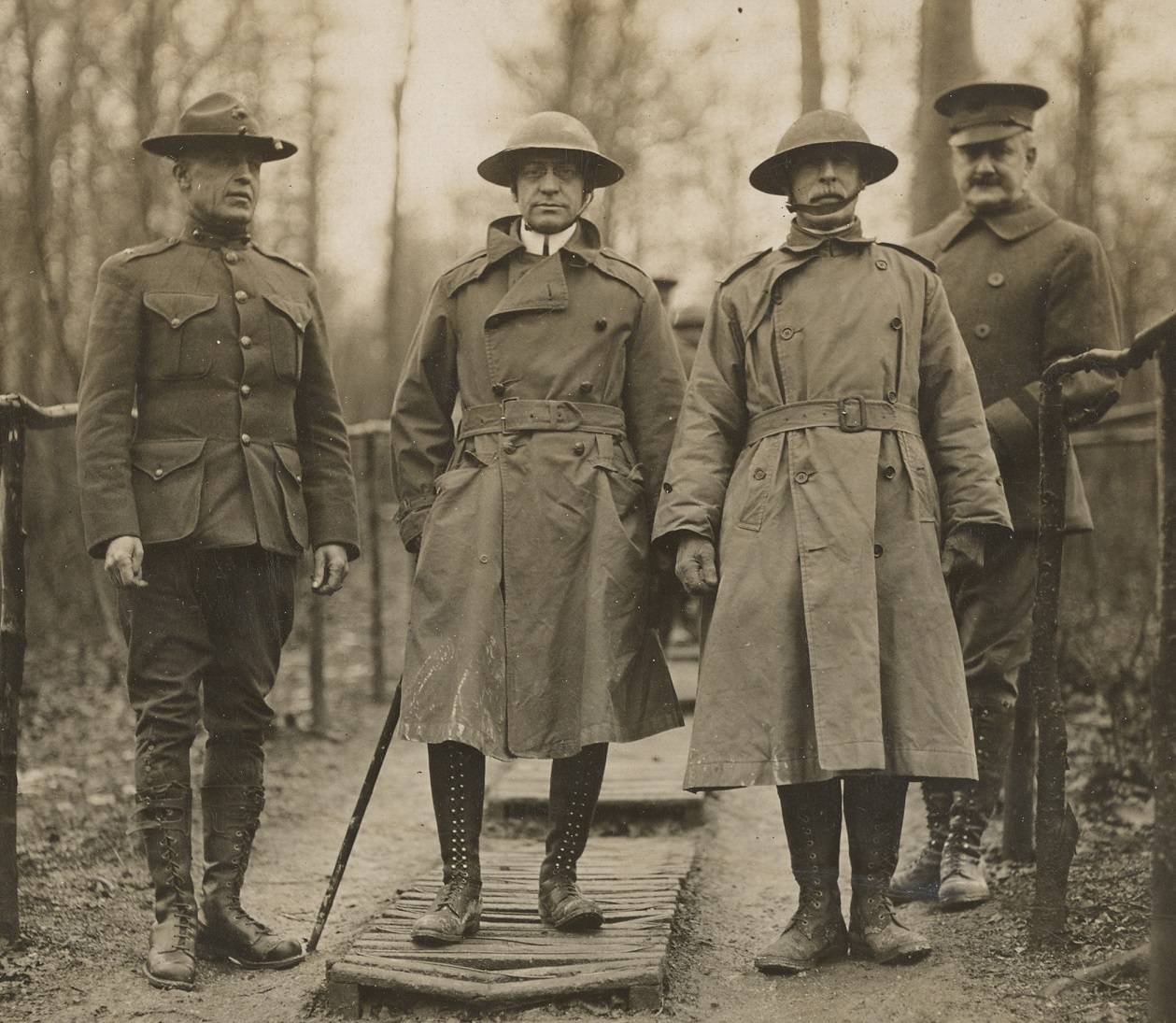
Major General Omar Bundy (second from the right) with Brigadier General James Harbord (right) and Secretary of War Newton D. Baker (second from left) March 20, 1918, during a tour of inspection of the AEF's lines of communication.

When the United States entered World War I in April 1917, Harbord was attending the United States Army War College. He was selected by Pershing, now a major general appointed to command the American Expeditionary Forces (AEF), to be his chief of staff. Harbord graduated in early May, and on 28 May set sail for England with Pershing and his headquarters staff. Over the next few months Harbord worked closely with Pershing to organize the AEF's buildup on France's Western Front, including the shipping schedules of American forces being sent to Europe, and he was promoted to temporary brigadier general in August 1917.

Following a great German offensive against the Western Front on March 21, 1918, the British and French armies were in retreat, and the need for American troops was urgent. Previously agreed to arrangements to provide 120,000 servicemen a month for three months was cast aside when Pershing was informed by the British that by using confiscated Dutch shipping, over 300,000 American soldiers could be sent a month. However, due to manpower attrition within the British Expeditionary Force (BEF), its combat divisions were reduced in strength by 25%, and with the breakthrough on the front, the British were asking that only infantry and machine gun battalions be sent over, and all other units be held back, as the overwhelming need at that time was for infantrymen. The American policy on this matter was quite different: Pershing was sent to France to organize American armies under American leadership; the idea that its combat units would be used solely as replacement units, or as reinforcements, for foreign countries was unthinkable. President Woodrow Wilson would not agree to this. He thought the idea would not go over well with the American public, and it risked preventing an American army from ever being formed. In secret conversations, General Pershing even said he was willing to risk the fall of France, because the United States would still carry on the war against the Kaiser; if his forces were stripped away from him and the Allies lost, then Germany would win complete victory. For his part, Prime Minister Clemenceau thought this plan appealed to the romantic side of America's intervention.

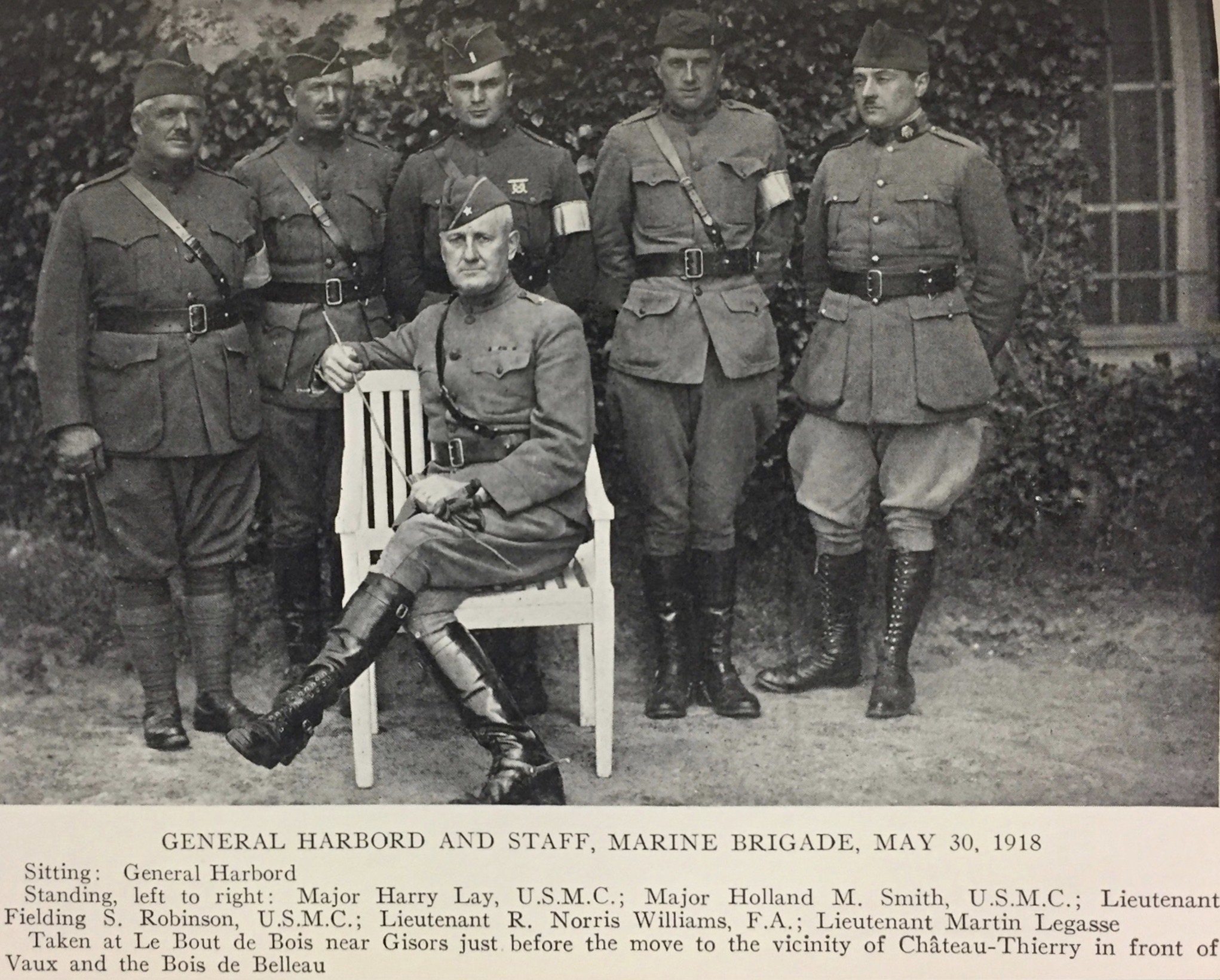
Brigadier General Harbord and members of his 4th Marine Brigade staff, May 1918

During a Supreme War Council meeting in Versailles on March 28, President Wilson shifted his position on American ground forces by allowing the temporary duty of AEF combat units in the British and French ranks (Joint Note #18). This was confirmed in, "The London Agreement" of April 27. However, at the next Supreme War Council meeting in Abbeville, held a month later, other troops were allowed, and Pershing held that the latest agreement was in force. This brought rebuke and a letter from Prime Minister Clemenceau to President Wilson. In a follow-up conversation between Lord Reading, the British ambassador to the United States, and Harbord, the ambassador said the British would be willing to supply the transportation of 120,000 American infantry and machine gun unit personnel to France, if the United States could supply the men. Harbord says the statement was like, "the sun breaking through the clouds" because, "If Great Britain can give us the ships to carry infantry alone, she could not refuse to carry troops from any other arm of the service. Accordingly, I said to him, 'Give me the ships, and I will furnish 120,000 men a month.'" When the ships arrived, the ship captains were instructed to accept only infantry and machine gun units. When Lord Reading found out that complete divisions were assembling, he was furious. When he was told that he must have misunderstood his conversation with Harbord, it looked like a conspiracy was in the works by the American generals. As a result of this, in May 1918, General Pershing transferred out much of his staff who he said, 'were too complacent about themselves, and how things are run around here'. The first to go was Harbord, who was sent forward to the trenches to command troops in battle. However, due to Harbord's decision, the American position prevailed, and full American divisions kept coming, so much so that by the time of the Armistice, the AEF. was two million men strong, two full American armies were formed, and a third was ready and deployed to the Rhineland in January 1919. In all, 40 complete divisions had arrived, 30 were fielded, and 10 were under temporary British control. A complete list of A.E.F. divisions can be found here.

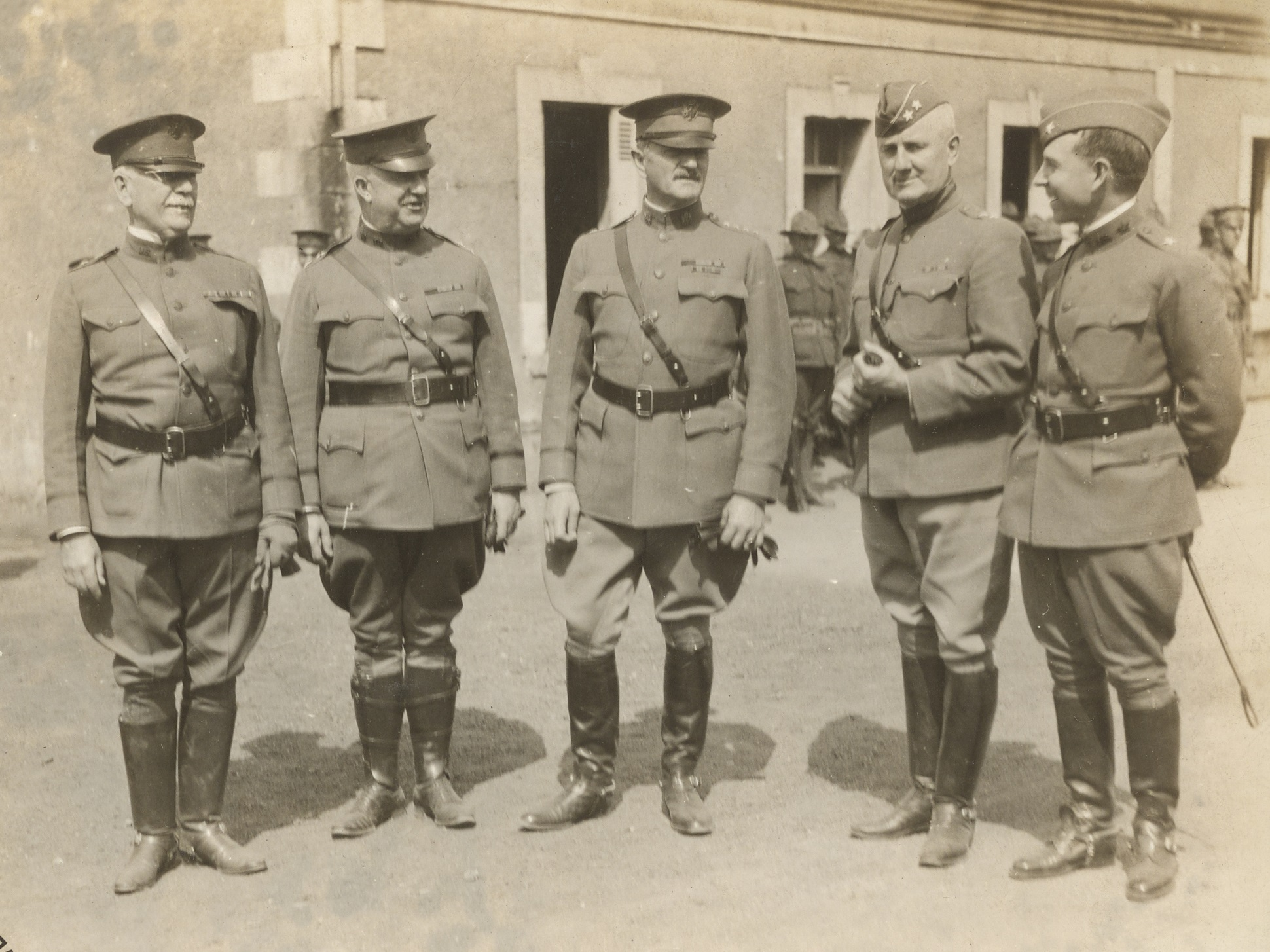
From left to right: Major General Francis J. Kernan, Major General James W. McAndrew, General John J. Pershing, Major General James Harbord and Brigadier General Johnson Hagood in Tours, France, July 1918

=== Combat commander ===
In early May 1918, Harbord, anxious to command men in battle, was succeeded as the AEF's chief of staff by Brigadier General James W. McAndrew. This was due to his new assignment, to command of the 4th Marine Brigade after its former commander, Brigadier General Charles A. Doyen, failed to pass a medical examination. The brigade, whose adjutant was Holland Smith, later famous during World War II, was serving as one of two infantry brigades which formed part of the 2nd Division, then commanded by Major General Omar Bundy. It was not long before Harbord was to see action with his brigade, commanding the marines at the famous battles of Château-Thierry and, in particular, at Belleau Wood where, on June 6, they suffered almost 1,100 casualties on just that day alone.

On July 15 Harbord was promoted to the temporary rank of major general and succeeded Bundy in command of the 2nd Division. That day also saw the Germans launch a new and, as it turned out, their last offensive of the war, Operation MARNESCHUTZ-REIMS, more commonly known as the Second Battle of the Marne. The attack immediately ran into difficulties and soon stalled. On July 18, three days after the opening of the offensive, the Germans were counterattacked by a well coordinated French assault, crashing into the German's right flank. Harbord's 2nd Division, by now serving in XX Corps of Charles Mangin's French 10th Army, launched an assault in the direction of Soissons, one of the enemy's key communications centers. Harbord and his divisional staff had had less than a day to prepare the attack plan for the division. In the midst of a thunderstorm, the infantry elements of the division marched all through the night to reach their lines of departure on time. The division launched three separate attacks over the next 24 hours although none of these received enough artillery support. Despite this, the 2nd Division still managed to reach its initial objective, the Soissons-Château-Thierry Highway, and had driven ahead nearly 7 miles, more than any other Allied units and formations involved. The cost was very high, however, as the division had sustained over 4,200 casualties.

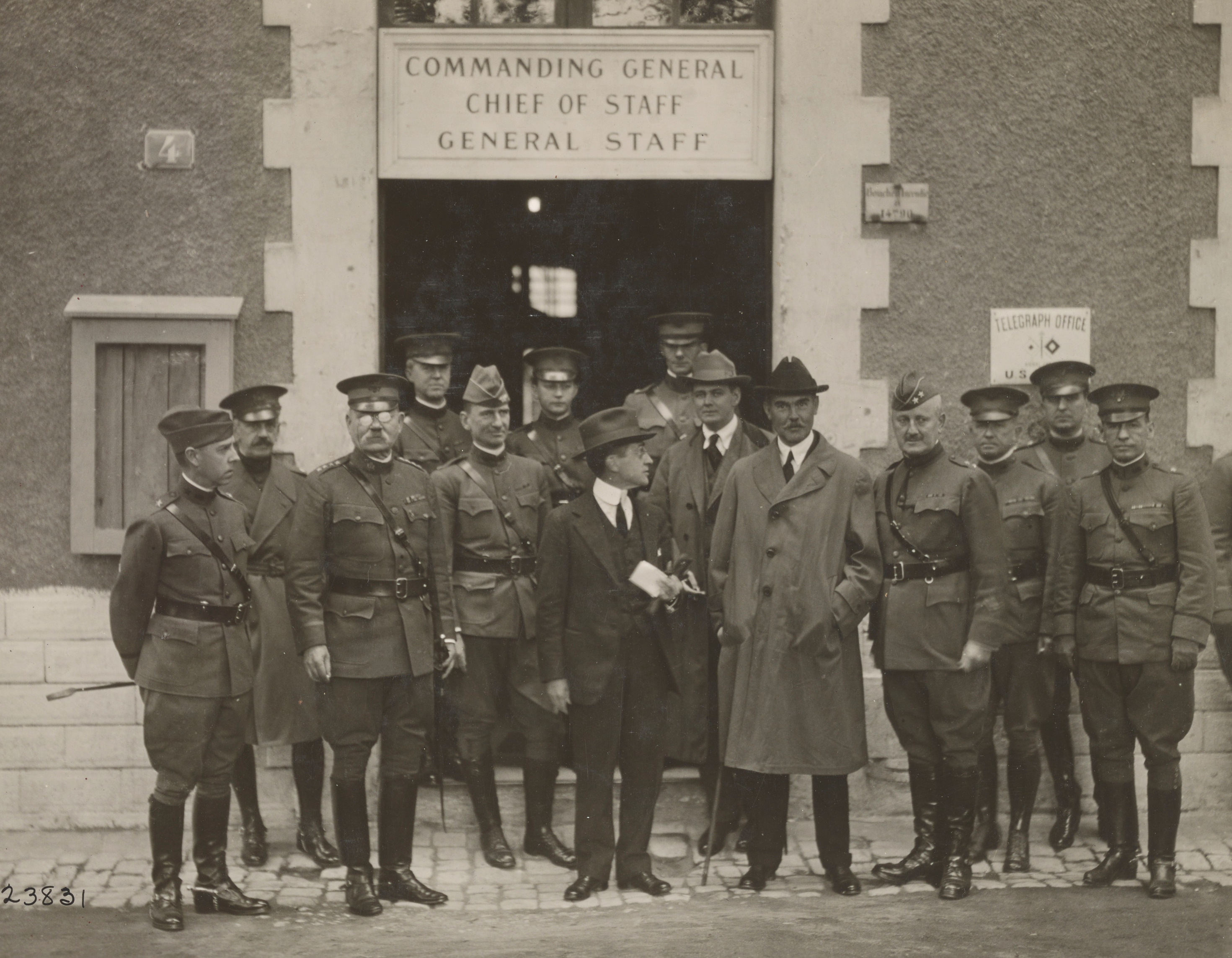
Harbord (fourth from the right) and staff during a visit of Secretary of War Newton D. Baker (center) at Harbord's SOS headquarters in Tours, France, October 1918

=== SOS commander ===
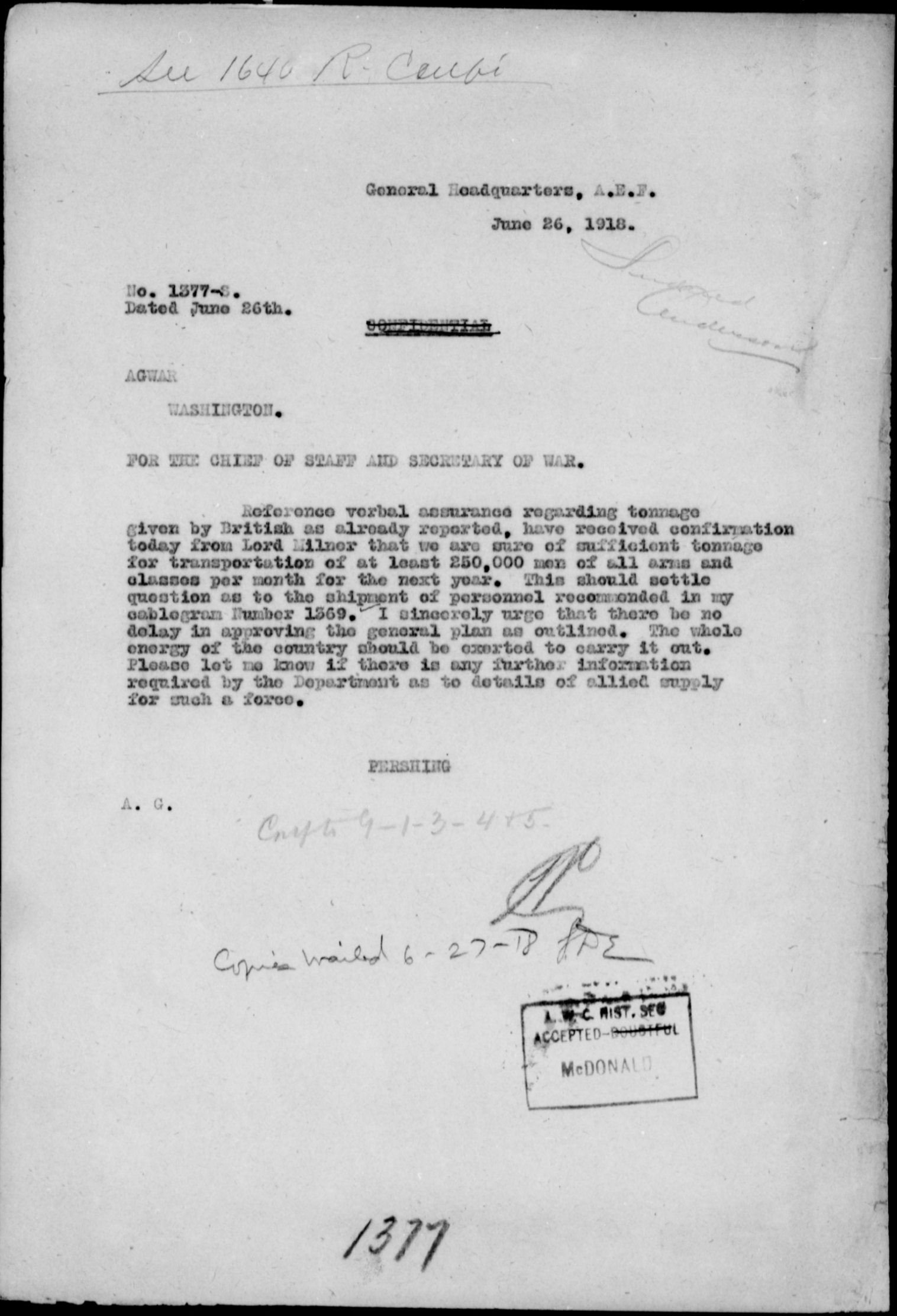
Confirmation of US Army Troop Shipments to France

After Major General Richard M. Blatchford, commanding the AEF's Services of Supply (SOS), and his replacement, Major General Francis J. Kernan, had failed to organize an adequate delivery of supplies to the American forces in France, Pershing asked Harbord in late July 1918 to take the job. Although disappointed, having only just assumed command of the 2nd Division, he nevertheless complied with Pershing's wishes. Marine Brigadier General John A. Lejeune took over from Harbord as the 2nd Division's new commander.

After moving the SOS headquarters to Tours, Harbord began introducing several reforms to the SOS and achieved almost instant improvements. The task of anticipating the arrival of divisions in France, and their type, and having in place the correct amount of supplies for them at the rear, toward the front, and at the front, was all worked out. It was at Harbord's insistence that the SOS became fully integrated among the American, British, and French armies. Pershing's trust in Harbord went so far that Jim Lacey wrote in his Pershing biography "if a problem were outside Harbord's ability to solve, it was not solvable by mortal man".

Despite this, things were not going well for the SOS. Although numbering 602,910 enlisted men, 30,593 officers and 5,586 nurses–almost a third of the entire strength of the AEF–under its control by November 1918, "the SOS system always operated under great strain and required constant tight control. After the war Harbord admitted that if the Armistice had not come when it did on 11 November 1918, the AEF would have had to stop fighting because its logistics system would have totally collapsed."

== Post-World War I ==
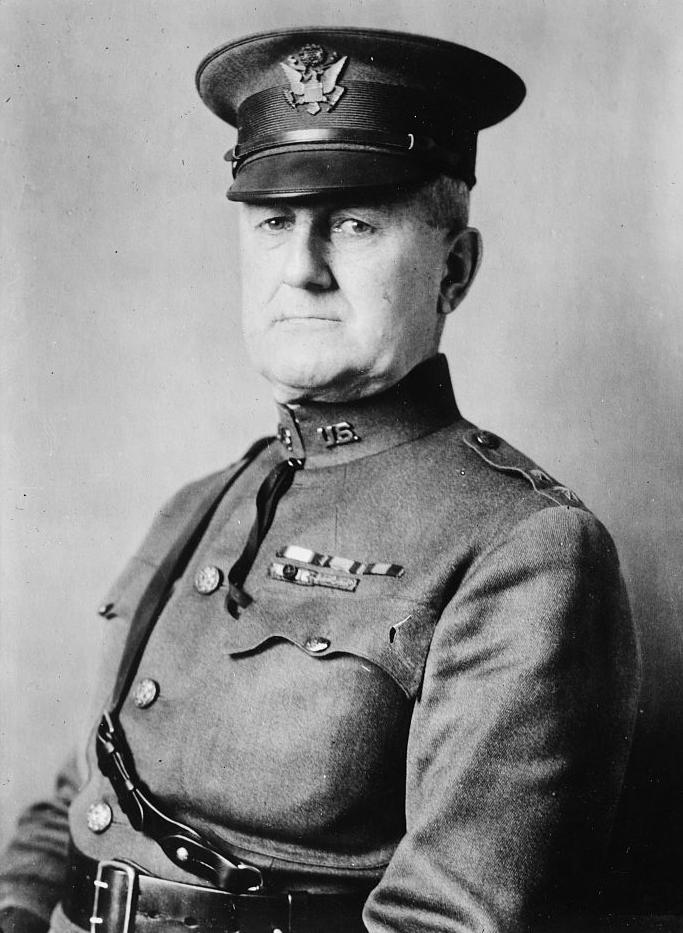
Harbord as a major general post-World War I

Following the war, he was promoted to permanent major general and was awarded both the Army Distinguished Service Medal and Navy Distinguished Service Medal. The citation for his Army DSM reads:

The President of the United States of America, authorized by Act of Congress, July 9, 1918, takes pleasure in presenting the Army Distinguished Service Medal to Major General James Guthrie Harbord, United States Army, for exceptionally meritorious and distinguished services to the Government of the United States, in a duty of great responsibility during World War I, as Chief of the Staff of the American Expeditionary Forces, and later as Commanding General, Services of Supply, in both of which important positions his great constructive ability and professional attainments have played an important part in the success obtained by our armies. General Harbord commanded the Marine Brigade of the 2d Division, Belleau Wood, and later ably commanded the 2d Division during the attack on Soissons, France, on 18 July 1918.

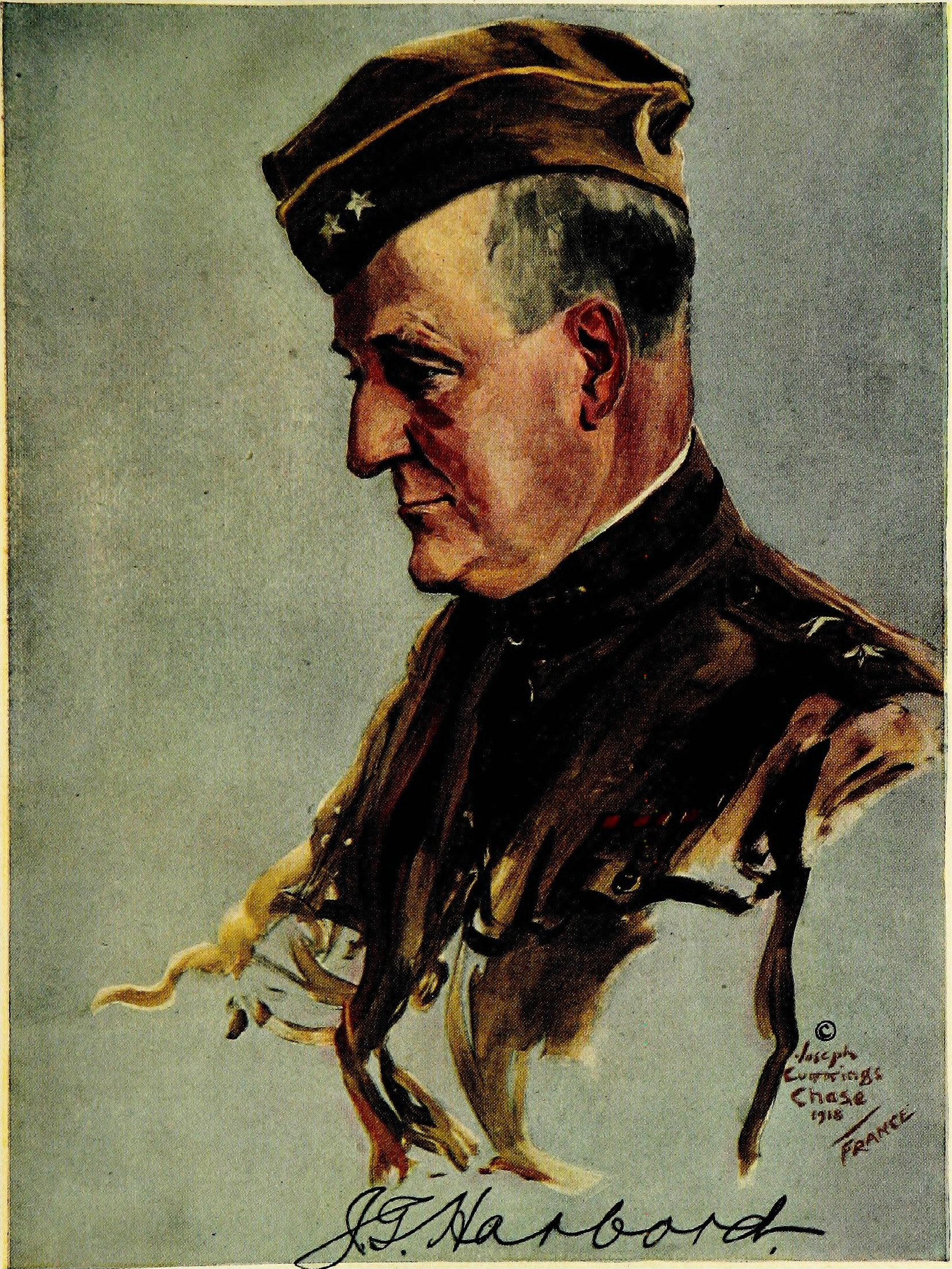
James G. Harbord, 1920

Harbord was also awarded numerous foreign decorations, which included: Legion of Honor (Commander) (France); Croix de Guerre with two palms (France); Order of the Crown (Grand Officer) (Belgium); Order of St Michael and St George (Knight Commander) (Great Britain); Order of Saints Maurice and Lazarus (Commander) (Italy); Order of Prince Danilo I (Grand Officer) (Montenegro); Order of Polonia Restituta (Grand Officer) (Poland); and La Medalla de Solidaridad (second class) (Panama).

=== The Harbord Report ===
In August 1919 President Wilson sent a fact-finding mission headed by Harbord to the Middle East to report on Ottoman–Armenian relations in the wake of the Armenian genocide. As chairman of the Harbord Commission, Harbord wrote a summary of the mission, Conditions in the Near East: Report of the American Military Mission to Armenia. The report includes maps, statistics, and a historical analyses of the country and its population. In addition, Harbord's commission collected evidence regarding the massacres of Armenians. Harbord's report stated that "the temptation to reprisals for past wrongs" would make it extremely difficult to maintain peace in the region. The report concluded that the inclusion of Armenia in the possible American mandate for Asia Minor and Rumelia was not feasible. Harbord was also sent to investigate the feasibility of the Balfour Declaration, which supported the creation of a Jewish state in the former Ottoman Empire's Palestine.

=== Continued military career ===
After returning home to the United States Harbord took command of the 2nd Division, the same formation he had commanded in France in 1918. His stay was short-lived, as it had been back then, as in 1921, when Pershing succeeded General Peyton C. March as Chief of Staff of the United States Army, he requested Harbord to join him in Washington, D.C. to serve as his Assistant Chief of Staff. At the time it was only a major general's appointment, equivalent to the modern day position of Vice Chief of Staff of the United States Army. While he was serving in this position Harbord "was instrumental in making the AEF's wartime G-staff system the standard model throughout the Army. That finally broke the bureaucratic power-lock of the old bureau chief system."

== Radio Corporation of America ==
In 1922, Harbord retired from the Army to become President of the Radio Corporation of America. In 1928, Harbord took a leave of absence to campaign for Herbert Hoover for president. He officially retired as RCA president in 1930 and was succeeded by David Sarnoff. Harbord then succeeded Owen D. Young as RCA's chairman of the board, and he served until July 1947, when he was succeeded by Sarnoff.

In 1932, Harbord was a candidate for vice president at the Republican National Convention. He finished in third place on the first ballot with 161 3/4 votes; 634 1/4 went to incumbent Charles Curtis, and 182 3/4 were cast for Hanford MacNider. The delegates then moved to make Curtis' re-nomination unanimous.

== Death and legacy ==
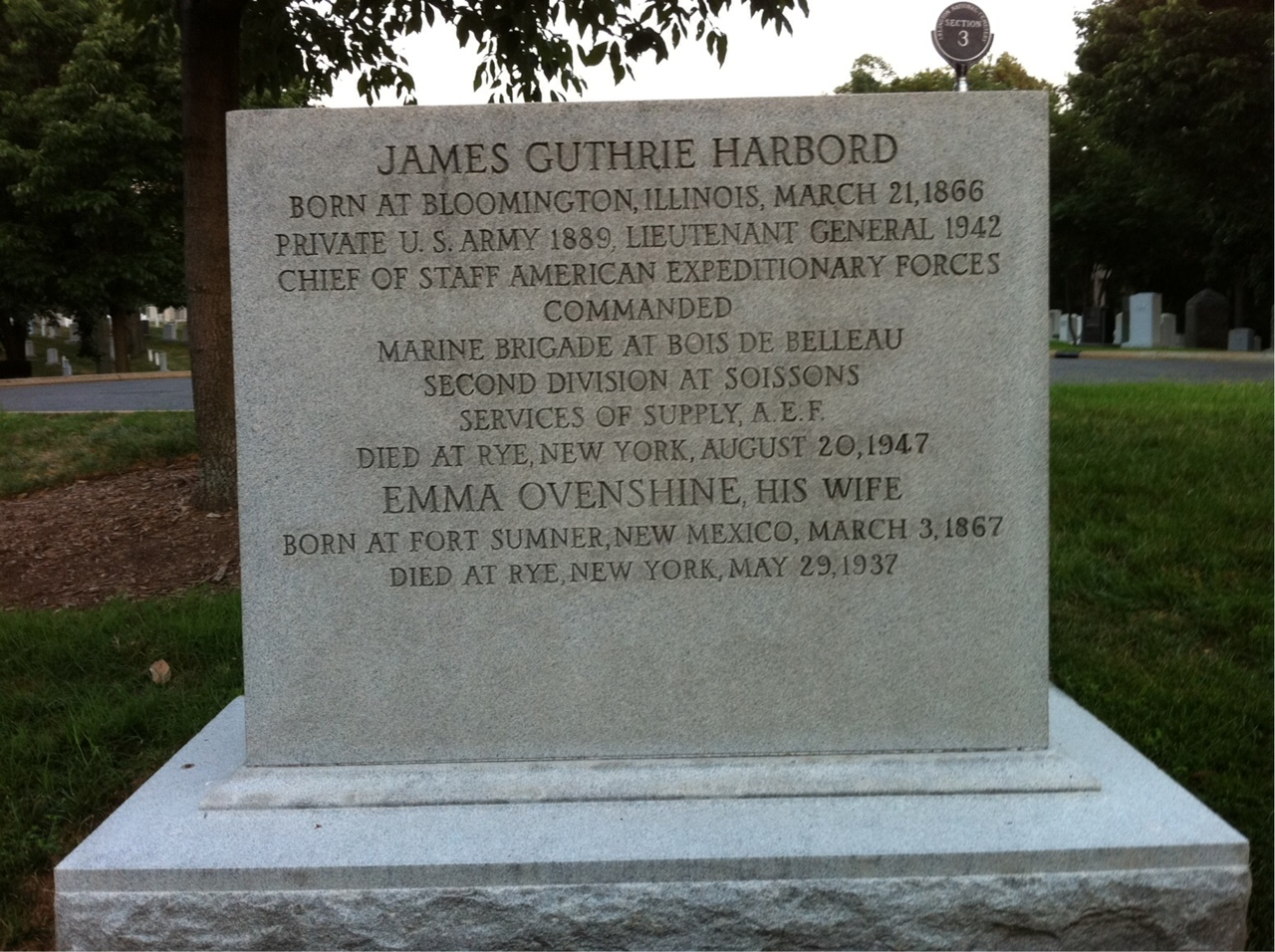
The grave of Lieutenant General James Harbord at Arlington National Cemetery, Virginia, US

In 1942, the U.S. Congress passed legislation allowing retired army generals to be advanced one rank on the retired list or posthumously if they had been recommended in writing during World War I for a promotion which they did not receive, and if they had received the Medal of Honor, the Distinguished Service Cross or the Army Distinguished Service Medal. Under these criteria, Harbord and William M. Wright were eligible for promotion to lieutenant general, and they were both advanced on the retired list effective July 9, 1942.

Harbord's civilian awards included the honorary degree of LL.D. from Kansas State Agricultural College (1920), Trinity College (Hartford, Connecticut) in 1924 and Yale University in 1928.

Harbord died in Rye, New York on August 20, 1947. He was buried at Arlington National Cemetery.

== Writings ==
- The American Expeditionary Forces, Its Organization and Accomplishments (1929) Link
- Leaves From a War Diary (1925) Link
- The American Army in France 1917-1919 (1936) Link
- The 40 Year March of Radio (1943) Link

== See also ==
- Witnesses and testimonies of the Armenian genocide
- "United Kingdom National Archives, CAB 23-6", (troops): pgs. 16-17, 164-165, and 172-173 of 457
- "United Kingdom National Archives, CAB 24-46", (dutch shipping): pg. 282 of 343

== Bibliography ==
- Archive.org (sign in to view highlighted footnotes and bibliographies)
- Callwell, C.E., Field Marshall Sir Henry Wilson, Vol II, London: Cassell, 1927
- Clemenceau, Georges, Grandeur and Misery of Victory, London: George Harrp, 1930
- Greenhalgh, Elizabeth, Foch in Command, New York: Cambridge, 2011
- Harbord, James G., Leaves From a War Diary, New York: Dodd Mead, 1925
- Harbord, James G., The American Army in France, Boston: Little Brown, 1936
- Harbord, James Guthrie. The American Expeditionary Forces: Its Organization and Accomplishments (Evanston Publishing Company, 1929)
- Lloyd George, David, War Memoirs of David Lloyd George, Vol V, Boston: Little Brown, 1936
- Marcosson, Issac F, S.O.S. America's Miracle in France, New York: Curth, 1919
- Pershing, John J., My Experiences in the World War, Vol I, New York: Frederick Stokes, 1931
- Russell, Thomasa H, America's War For Humanity, Detroit: F.E. Ritz, 1919
- Stewart, Richard, American Military History, Vol. II, Washington, D.C.: Center of Military History, 2005
- The Times (of London), archive
- The United States Army in the First World War, 1917–1919, Volume 3, Washington D.C.: US Army, 1989 pdf download
- UK National Archives, online
- Smythe, Donald, Pershing: General of the Armies, Bloomington, IN: Indiana University Press, 1986

Military offices
Preceded by Harry A. Eaton	Commanding General 2nd Infantry Division; 1920–1921	Succeeded by John L. Hines
