= Casper H. Conrad Jr. =

U.S. Army brigadier general

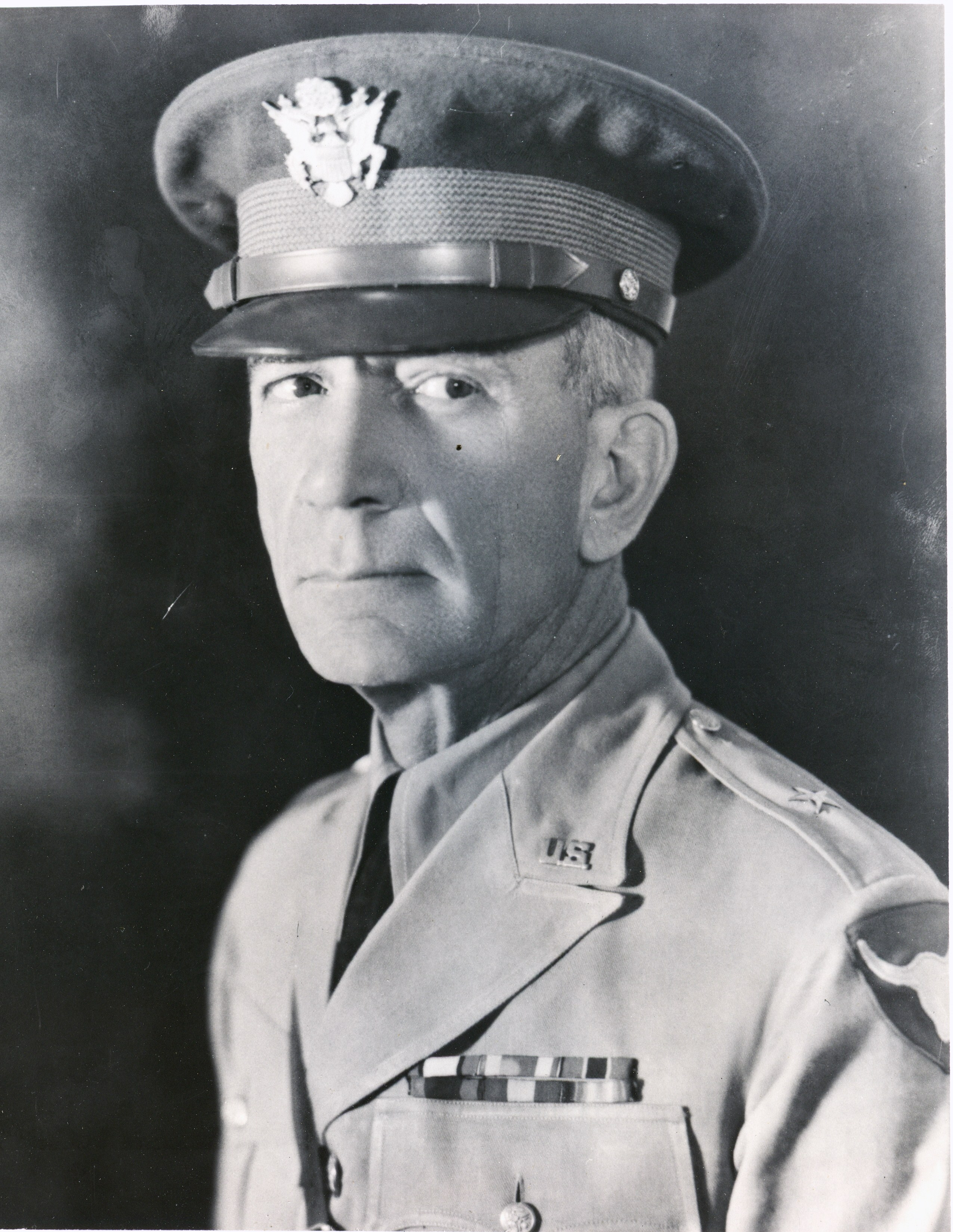
- Conrad as commander of the Philippine Division, circa 1932
- Born: September 26, 1872; Columbus, Ohio, U.S.
- Died: August 12, 1954 (aged 81); San Antonio, Texas
- Burial place: Arlington National Cemetery
- Spouse(s): Harriet Marshall Shacklette (m. 1911–1917, her death); Eva M. Shacklette (m. 1923–1954, his death)
- Military career
- Allegiance: United States
- Branch: United States Army
- Service years: 1895–1936
- Rank: Brigadier General
- Unit: U.S. Army Cavalry Branch
- Commands: Troop A, 3rd Cavalry; Front Royal Remount Depot; 360th Infantry, 90th Division; Advanced Embarkation Section, Germany; Base Section Number 1; 12th Infantry Brigade; Fort Sheridan, Illinois; 23rd Infantry Brigade; Philippine Division; Fort William McKinley; 4th Infantry Brigade; Wyoming Civilian Conservation Corps District; 3rd Infantry Division; Fort Lewis Civilian Conservation Corps District; Ninth Corps Area
- Conflicts: Spanish–American War; Philippine–American War; Pancho Villa Expedition; World War I
- Awards: Army Distinguished Service Medal; Order of the Dragon of Annam (Commander) (French Indochina)

Casper H. Conrad Jr. (September 26, 1872 – August 12, 1954) was a career officer in the United States Army. A veteran of the Spanish–American War, Philippine–American War, Pancho Villa Expedition, and World War I, he served from 1895 to 1936 and attained the rank of brigadier general.

== Early life ==
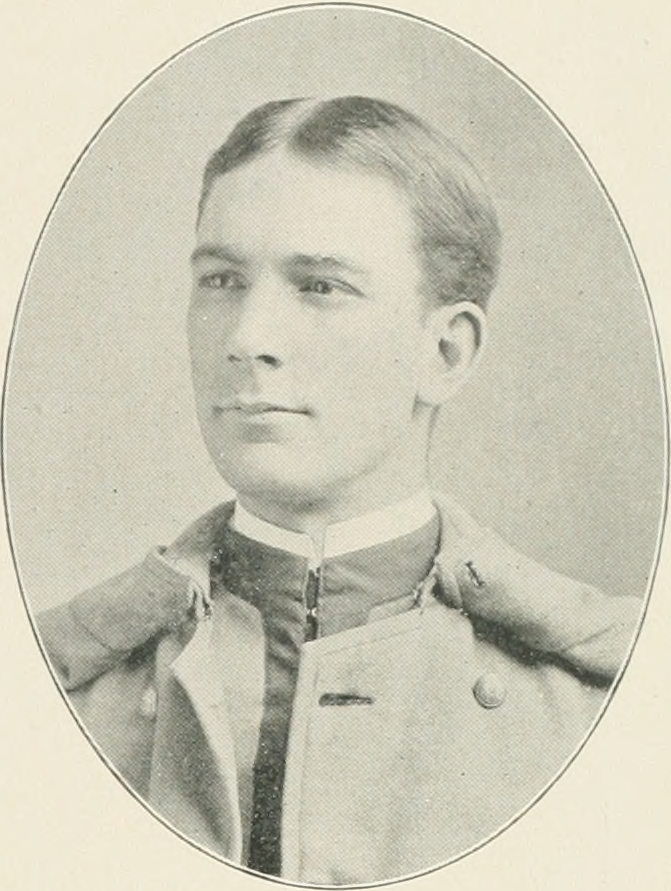
Conrad as a United States Military Academy cadet c. 1895

Casper Hauzer Conrad Jr. was born in Columbus, Ohio on September 26, 1872, the son of Major Casper H. Conrad Sr. (1844–1898), a Union Army veteran of the American Civil War who remained on active duty until his death during the Spanish–American War, and Ella (Cotton) Conrad (1849–1908).

Conrad was raised and educated at various Army posts as the family traveled for his father's career. After attending Shattuck Military Academy, in 1890 he was appointed to the United States Military Academy from South Dakota. In 1893, Conrad was chosen for the post of Cadet First Captain, the highest position in the student rank structure, but before the start of the 1893–1894 school year he was dismissed from the academy. Conrad's expulsion resulted from his decision to go to off limits locations during a cadet visit to the World's Columbian Exposition in Chicago. In 1894, he was permitted to return to the academy and he graduated in 1895, ranked fifth of 52.

== Start of career ==
In June 1895, Conrad was commissioned as a second lieutenant and assigned to the 6th Cavalry Regiment. In July he was transferred to the 5th Cavalry. He performed garrison duty at Fort Ringgold, Texas from October to December 1895. He next served at Fort Clark, Texas until May 1898. At the start of the Spanish–American War, Conrad traveled to New Orleans with the 5th Cavalry in preparation for deployment to Cuba. He performed temporary recruiting duty at Jackson Barracks, Louisiana, then rejoined his regiment, first at the Port of Mobile, then at the Port of Tampa. He became ill before the regiment left for Cuba in June, and was hospitalized in Huntsville, Alabama from June to August 1898. From August 1898 until March 1899, Conrad was on extended sick leave. He was promoted to first lieutenant on March 2, 1899.

Conrad was on duty at Camp George Meade, Pennsylvania from March to June 1899, and served as assistant quartermaster and assistant chief of staff of the post hospital. In June 1899, Conrad rejoined the 5th Cavalry in Quemado de Güines, Cuba, and he was assigned as adjutant of the regiment's 3rd Squadron. He served with the regiment at Pinar del Río, Cuba from July 1899 to August 1900. From August 1900 to May 1901, Conrad served at Columbia Barracks, Cuba. He was promoted to captain in the 3rd Cavalry on April 23, 1901.

After travel from Cuba to the Philippines, Conrad took part in the Philippine–American War as commander of Troop A, 3rd Cavalry. He was on duty with his troop at Namacpacan, La Union (now Luna, La Union) from May to August 1901. He served in La Union from August 1901 to January 1902. From January to May 1902, he served at San Fernando, La Union.

== Continued career ==
Conrad returned to the United States in the summer of 1902. He served with Troop A at Fort Assinniboine, Montana from August 1902 to June 1903. From June to October 1903 he served at Fort Yellowstone, Wyoming, after which he returned to Fort Assinniboine. He was on detached duty as adjutant of the Jefferson Guard at the Louisiana Purchase Exposition in St. Louis from April 1904 to March 1905. He then returned to Fort Assinniboine, where he remained until November 1905.

From December 1905 to April 1907, Conrad served with the 5th Cavalry at Fort Stotsenburg, Philippines. He served in Leyte, Philippines during an expedition against the Pulahan from April to July 1907, after which he returned to Camp Stotsenburg. From February to June 1908, Conrad served with the 5th Cavalry at Fort Clark, Texas. From June to August 1908 he served with his regiment on the Texas-Mexico border, after which he returned to Fort Clark.

From April to October 1909, Conrad served in the office of the Army's Quartermaster General. He then returned to Fort Clark, where he served with the 5th Cavalry until March 1910. From March 1910 to May 1913, Conrad served at Front Royal, Virginia, where he established a remount depot and started a department that oversaw the breeding of Cavalry horses.

As a member of the 15th Cavalry, Conrad served at Fort Sheridan, Illinois, then at a Cavalry camp of instruction in Winchester, Virginia. The 15th Cavalry moved to Fort Bliss, Texas in November 1913, where it performed security duty on the Texas-Mexico border until August 1915. In August 1915, Conrad transferred to the 8th Cavalry. He then attended the School of Equitation at the Fort Riley, Kansas Mounted Service School. After graduation in May 1916, he returned to Fort Bliss. In July 1916 he was promoted to major in the 3rd Cavalry.

During the Pancho Villa Expedition, Conrad served on the Texas–Mexico border as an advisor to federalized National Guard units. He served at Camp Wilson, Texas, as an advisor to the 1st Alabama Cavalry from December 1916 to March 1917. He then returned to duty with the 3rd Cavalry at Fort Sam Houston, Texas, where he remained until August 1917. In July 1917, Conrad was promoted to lieutenant colonel.

== World War I ==
In August 1917, Conrad was promoted to temporary colonel and assigned to command the 360th Infantry Regiment, a unit of the 90th Division, at Camp Travis, Texas. He led his regiment until June 1918, then was assigned to duty in Washington, D.C., with the General Staff Corps, where he remained until February 1919. In March 1919, Conrad arrived in Europe and was assigned to command the Service of Supply's Advanced Embarkation Section in Germany, followed by command of Base Section Number 1 in Saint-Nazaire, France. He returned to the United States in July 1919. In August 1919 he reverted to his permanent rank of lieutenant colonel.

== Post-World War I ==
Conrad attended the School of the Line (now the United States Army Command and General Staff College) at Fort Leavenworth, Kansas from August 1919 to June 1920 and was an honor graduate. In July 1920, he was promoted to colonel. From September 1920 to June 1922, Conrad attended the University of Illinois at Urbana–Champaign, and he completed a Bachelor of Science degree in agriculture with senior honors. He was then assigned as a student at the United States Army War College, from which he graduated in June 1923.

From July to November 1923, Conrad performed temporary duty in the office of the Army's Inspector General. He served as inspector general of the Philippine Department from January 1924 to March 1926. He then returned to duty with the Army Inspector General, where he remained until October 1928. On October 16, 1928, Conrad was promoted to brigadier general.

== Later career ==
From January 1929 to August 1930 Conrad was commander of the 12th Infantry Brigade and the post at Fort Sheridan, Illinois. From October 1930 to June 1931 he commanded the 23rd Infantry Brigade at Fort William McKinley, Philippines. He was then assigned to command the Philippine Division and Fort McKinley, where he remained until July 1933.

Conrad commanded the 4th Infantry Brigade and the Wyoming Civilian Conservation Corps District at Fort Warren, Wyoming from August 1933 to June 1935. From August 1935 to August 1936 Conrad commanded the 3rd Infantry Division and the Fort Lewis, Washington Civilian Conservation Corps District. In 1936, he also served as acting commander of Ninth Corps Area. Conrad left the military in September 1936 after reaching the mandatory retirement age of 64.

== Later life ==
Conrad was a recipient of the Army Distinguished Service Medal for his World War I service. In 1932, Conrad received the Order of the Dragon of Annam (Commander) from French Indochina.

In retirement, Conrad was a resident of San Antonio, Texas. He died in San Antonio on August 12, 1954. He was buried at Arlington National Cemetery.

== Family ==
In 1911, Conrad married Harriet Marshall Shacklette (1874–1917). In 1923, he married Eva Shacklette (1873–1956), the sister of his first wife. Conrad had no children with either wife.
