= Johnson Hagood (United States Army officer) =

United States Army general (1873–1948)

Major General Johnson Hagood
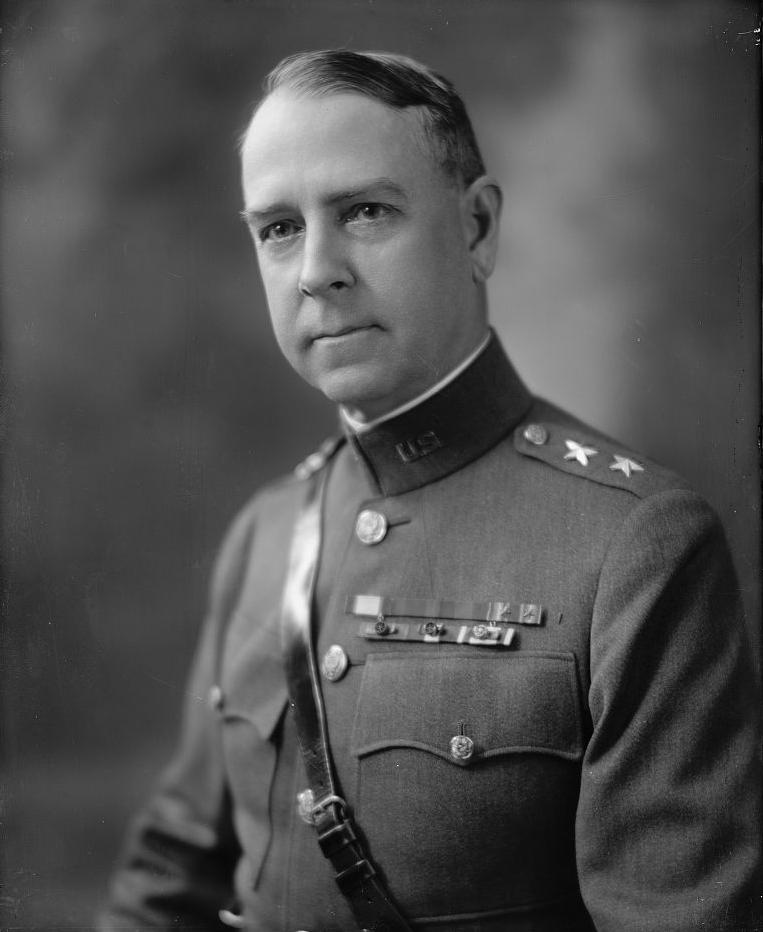
- Major General Johnson Hagood
- Born: June 16, 1873; Orangeburg, South Carolina, U.S.
- Died: December 22, 1948 (aged 75); Chicago, Illinois, U.S.
- Relatives: James L. Holloway, Jr. (son-in-law); Johnson Hagood (uncle)
- Military career
- Allegiance: United States
- Branch: United States Army
- Service years: 1896–1936
- Rank: Major General
- Service number: 0-82
- Commands: Third United States Army
- Conflicts: Spanish–American War; World War I
- Awards: Army Distinguished Service Medal; Commander of the Legion of Honor (France); Commander of the Order of the Crown of Italy; Grand Officer of the Order of the Sacred Treasure (Japan)

Major General Johnson Hagood (June 16, 1873 – December 22, 1948) was born in Orangeburg, South Carolina, graduated from the United States Military Academy in 1896, was commissioned in the artillery, and served in France in World War I, where he created the Services of Supply. He retired in 1936 after publicly criticizing New Deal funding.

== Early military career ==
- Garrison service in Rhode Island, Connecticut, and South Carolina from 1896 to 1901.
- Instructor in the department of philosophy, U.S. Military Academy, 1901–04.
- Assistant to chief of artillery, Washington, D.C., 1905–07.
- Member of the General Staff Corps, 1908.
- Aide de camp to Maj. Gen. J.F. Bell, 1908–10.
- Assistant to Major General Leonard Wood, re-detailed to General Staff Corps until 1912.
- Commander Fort Flagler, Washington, 1912–13.
- Overseas service in the Philippines, 1913–15.
- Various commands, Coastal Defense, 1915–17.

== During World War I ==
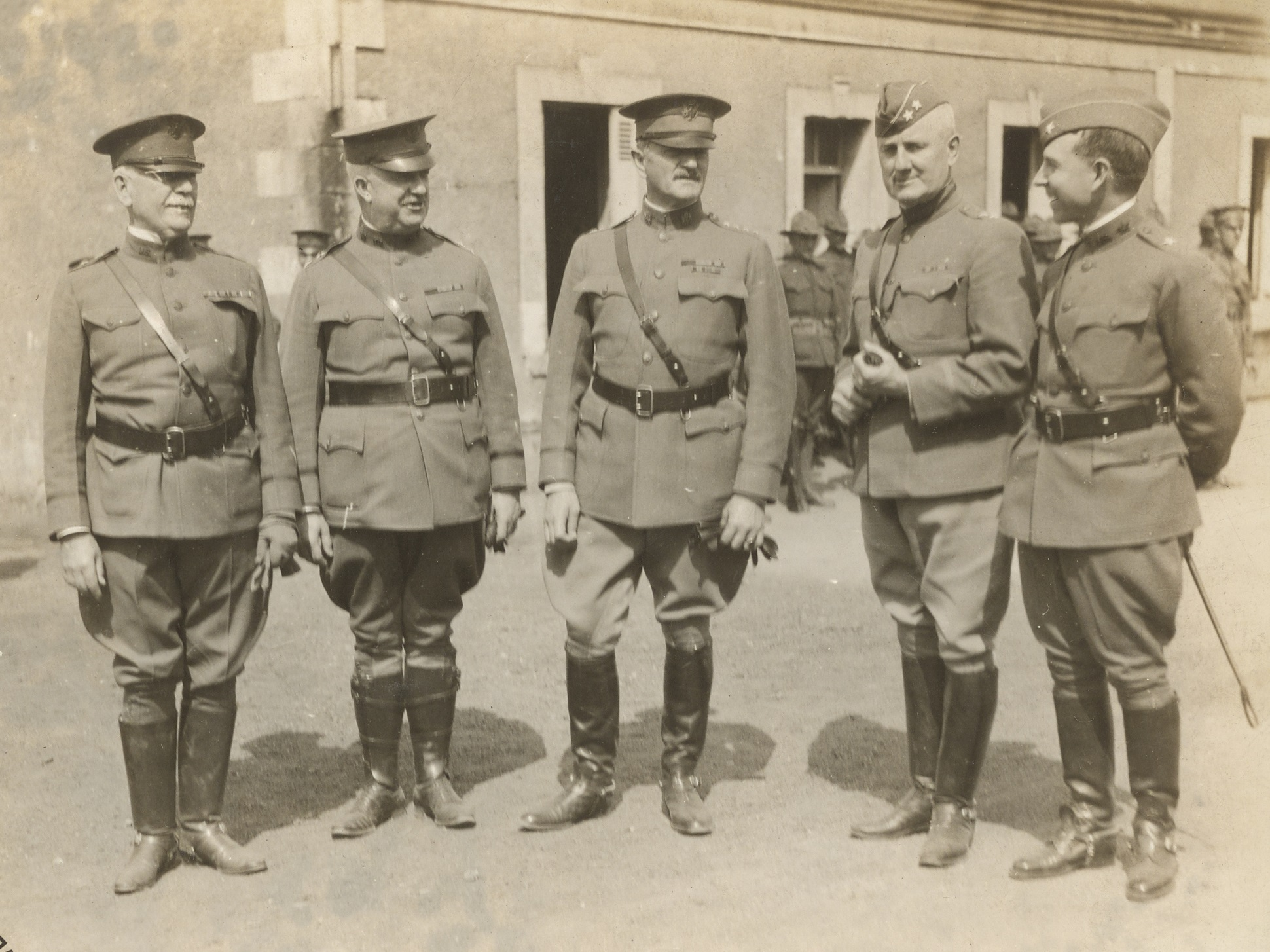
From left to right: Major General Francis J. Kernan, Major General James W. McAndrew, General John J. Pershing, Major General James Harbord and Brigadier General Johnson Hagood in Tours, France, July 1918.

- Commander, 7th Regiment, 1st Expeditionary Brigade, Coast Artillery Corps, July 16, 1917.
- He arrived in France on Sept. 11, 1917, and fought near Soissons, September to October.
- He organized and commanded the advance section Line of Communications, A.E.F.
- He served in command Neufchateau, Nov. 1 to Dec. 1, and as chief of staff, Line of Communications, Dec. 2. He was assigned to the General Staff, A.E.F., on Jan. 10, 1918.
- He served as President of the board that reorganized the A.E.F. staff and created the Services of Supply (S.O.S.). He served as chief of staff S.O.S. until Armistice.
- He was in battle sectors along American, French, and British fronts, June–July 1918 and participated in the Meuse-Argonne offensive, Oct. 1918.
- He was appointed commander 20th C.A. Brigade and was transferred to the 66th F.A. Brigade.
- He represented the American Army in replying to address of Marshal Joffre, Paris, May 12, 1918.
- On Dec. 31, 1918, he crossed the Rhein River and established headquarters at Hohr, Germany.
- Commanded army artillery of Third Army and corps artillery of 3d Corps.
- Served in the Army of Occupation until May 16, 1919, when he sailed for the U.S.

== After World War I ==
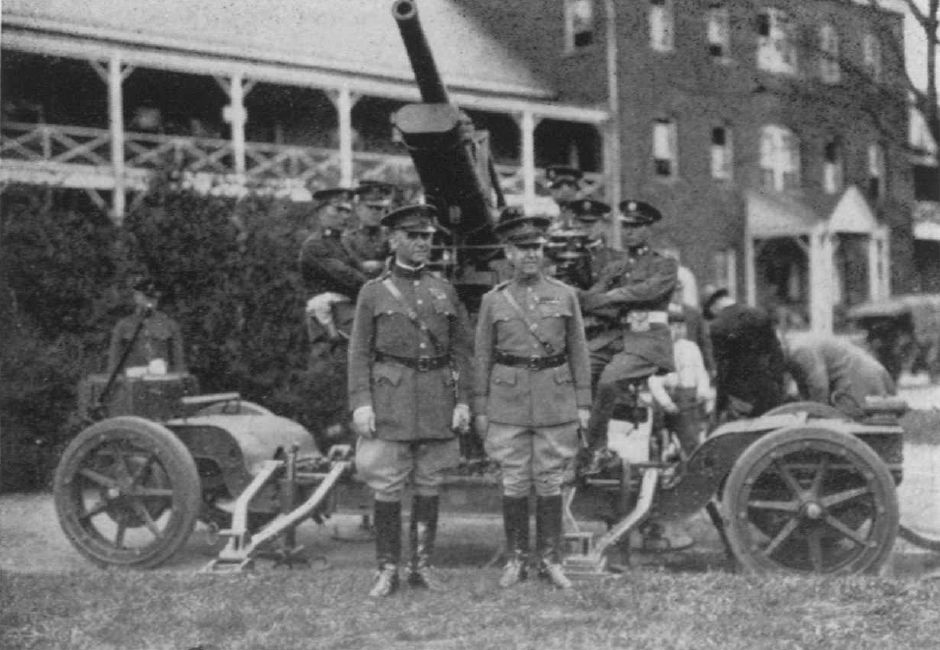
Major General Charles P. Summerall, commanding the 2nd Corps Area, and Brigadier General Johnson Hagood, commanding the 2nd Coast Artillery District, during an anti-aircraft day, May 1925.

- He was assigned to command 30th Brigade (Ry.), C.A.C., and Camp Eustis, Va., Nov. 24, 1919.
- Commanded South Atlantic Coast Artillery District., Nov. 1920 to Sep. 1921.
- Commander, Fort Stotsenburg, P.I., Feb. 1, 1922.
- Commander, 2d Coast Art., Dist., Ft. Totten, N.Y., August 1924.
- Commander, 4th Corps Area, Oct. 5, 1925 to March 1927.
- Commander Philippine Division, April 1927 to June 1929.
- Commander, Seventh Corps Area August 1929 to October 1933.
- Commander, 4th Army Area 1932–33.
- Commander, Third Army and 8th Corps Area, 1933–36.

== Inventions ==
Among his inventions were the Hagood tripod mount, mortar deflection board, and other apparatus connected with sea-coast defense.

== Political controversy ==
Toward the end of the career, Hagood was embroiled in political controversy when he criticized President Franklin Delano Roosevelt's New Deal, saying its funding was "stage money". Soon after his comments became public on February 10, 1936, he was relieved from command of the Eighth Corps Area (headquartered at Fort Sam Houston, Texas). Hagood requested a meeting with Roosevelt to explain himself, and was granted three months leave. Hagood's friends in the U.S. Congress pressured Roosevelt to give him a new command, however, and less than half the leave had elapsed before he was given command of the Fifth Corps Area, headquartered in Chicago, Illinois. Just one day after assuming command May 1, he asked for and was granted immediate retirement. After one month of leave, he officially left the U.S. Army on May 31, 1936.

== Awards ==
Hagood's decorations include the Distinguished Service Medal, Commander of the Legion of Honor (French), Commander Order of the Crown of Italy, Grand Officer Order of the Sacred Treasure (Japanese). Hagood also received the Spanish Campaign Medal, Philippine Campaign Medal and World War I Victory Medal.

In 1927, General Hagood was admitted as an hereditary member of the South Carolina Society of the Cincinnati.

=== Distinguished Service Medal citation ===
Brigadier General Johnson Hagood, U.S. Army. (General Orders No. 12, War Department, 1919.) As Chief of Staff of the Services of Supply of the American Expeditionary Forces in France, his ability for organization, his energy, and his sound judgement were factors in the efficiency of this important branch. By his marked zeal and aggressiveness he greatly added to the successful administration of the Services of Supply.

== Personal life ==
His homes were in Charleston, S.C., and San Antonio, Texas.

Asked how to say his name, he told The Literary Digest: "The name, peculiar to the South, is pronounced in a southern way. During all the years of my boyhood in South Carolina, I never knew there was anything unusual about it, for I never heard it in any other way than as haig'-wood. The name was originally spelled Haguewood, and is still properly so pronounced."

Hagood was the nephew of Confederate Brigadier General Johnson Hagood who commanded the troops at Fort Wagner during the attack by the 54th Massachusetts Infantry and served as Governor of South Carolina from 1880 to 1882. Hagood held a romanticized view of the Reconstruction era South, claiming that his family recovered "after Sherman's March through their plantations, all without one penny of outside help." Hagood was a staunch defender of white supremacy and segregation, claiming that they were a primary law of nature and necessary for preserving the United States. However, he rejected antisemitism, saying that Jews "are a very fine people, and what would we have done without them?" He claimed that antisemitism was motivated purely by the economic success of Jews. Ironically, his praise of Jews still mentioned the concept of race; Hagood admired Jews for having maintained "their race pride, their prejudice against other races and survived," and thus remaining "true to their blood and their faith."

Hagood died on December 22, 1948.

== Bibliography ==
- Association of Graduates, U.S.M.A. Register of Graduates and Former Cadets. Cullum no. 3691.
- Hagood, Johnson. The Services of Supply: A Memory of the Great War, 1927.
- "R.O.T.C. – Key to National Defense". CavJrnl 40 (Sep–Oct 1931) p. 5.
- We Can Defend America, 1937
- Soldiers Handbook, 1946
- Meet Your Grandfather, 1946
- "Closing the Gap in National Defense". Saturday Evening Post
- "I Had a Talk with the President". Saturday Evening Post
- United States. American Decorations. Washington: U.S. Government Printing Office, 1927. p. 711.

Military offices
Preceded by Edwin B. Winans	Commanding General of the Third United States Army; 4 October 1933 – 27 February 1936	Succeeded by Frank Parker
