= George True Bartlett =

United States Army general (1856–1949)

George T. Bartlett
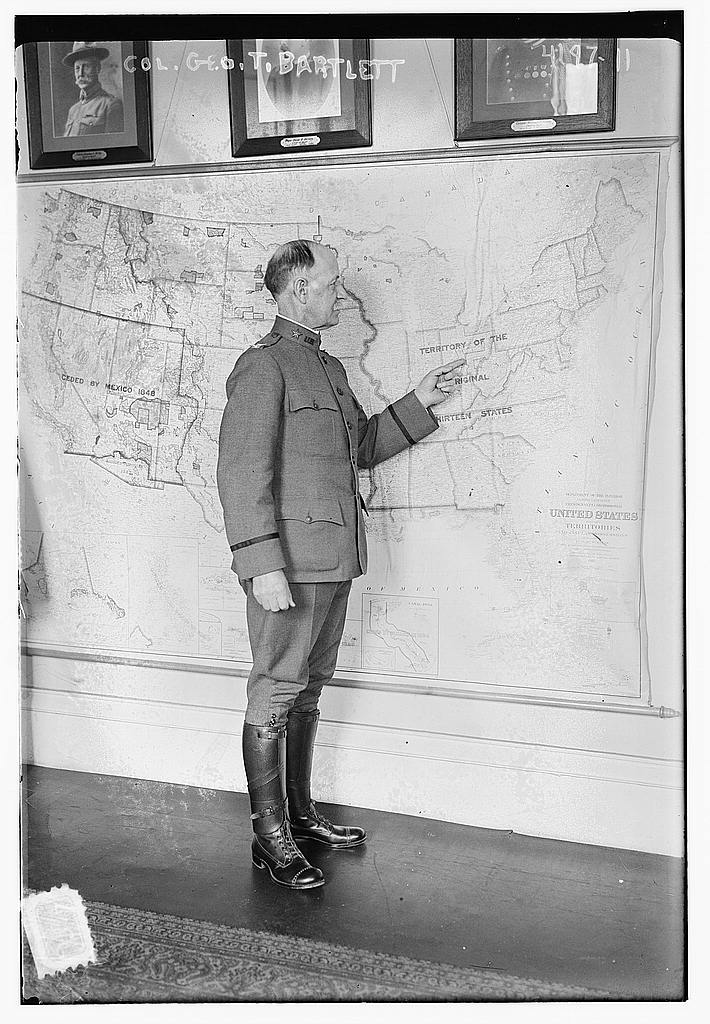
- George T. Bartlett in 1917
- Born: April 29, 1856; Wolfeboro, New Hampshire, U.S.
- Died: March 11, 1949 (aged 92); San Antonio, Texas, U.S.
- Burial place: Fort Sam Houston National Cemetery, Texas, U.S.
- Military career
- Allegiance: United States
- Branch: United States Army
- Service years: 1881–1918
- Rank: Major general
- Service number: 0-13119

George True Bartlett (April 29, 1856 – March 11, 1949) was a major general in the United States Army.

== Early life ==
Bartlett was born at Wolfeboro, New Hampshire on April 29, 1856. He was admitted to the United States Military Academy in 1877 as a candidate from Kansas. He graduated number ten of fifty-three in the class of 1881.

== Career ==
Bartlett was commissioned in the Third Artillery Brigade upon graduation. He was a professor of Military Science and Tactics at Pennsylvania Military College from 1885 to 1888. In 1889, he was promoted to first lieutenant, and in 1890 he graduated from the Artillery School. From 1894 to 1898, he was again Professor of Military Science and Tactics, this time at the Agricultural and Mechanical College of Texas. When the Spanish–American War started he became a major of United States Volunteers and chief commissary of the Department of Santiago in Cuba, was promoted to captain of artillery in 1899, and was the adjutant of the Artillery School at Fort Monroe, in Virginia, from 1903 to 1906.

He was also a member of the board to revise the Coast Artillery drill regulations. On March 26, 1906, Bartlett was promoted to major, Coast Artillery, and on December 4, 1909, he became lieutenant colonel. He became colonel of the Coast Artillery in December 1911 and a brigadier general in August 1917, serving two long tours of duty with the General Staff. In France, he commanded a brigade of railroad artillery. From October 1917 to March 1918, he commanded Base Section Number 3. Bartlett then became a member of the Inter-Allied Military Commission in Greece, as well as the United States' military attaché in Athens.

On September 25, 1918, he retired as a brigadier general.

In 1930, Bartlett's major general status was restored by act of Congress.

== Death and legacy ==
George True Bartlett died at the age of ninety-two in San Antonio, Texas on March 11, 1949. He was buried at the Fort Sam Houston National Cemetery in San Antonio, Texas.

== Bibliography ==
- Davis, Henry Blaine. Generals in Khaki. Raleigh, NC: Pentland Press, 1998. ISBN 1571970886 OCLC 231779136
- Marquis Who's Who, Inc. Who Was Who in American History, the Military. Chicago: Marquis Who's Who, 1975. ISBN 0837932017 OCLC 657162692
