= Persian (roll) =

Fried sweet roll or doughnut with a spiral shape

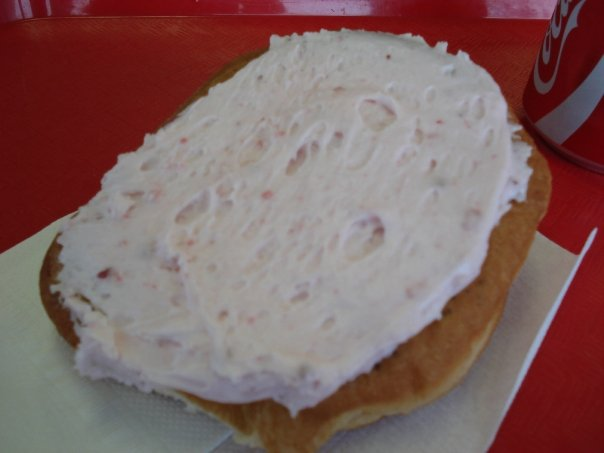
- A Persian roll as made in Thunder Bay, Ontario, Canada
- Alternative names: Pershing
- Type: Sweet bread
- Main ingredients: Sweet dough
- Variations: Iced, glazed, cinnamon sugar

A Persian, Persian roll or Pershing is a deep fried sweet roll with a spiral shape similar to a cinnamon bun. It may be covered with a sugar glaze, iced or frosted, or sprinkled with sugar or cinnamon sugar. The roll is especially popular around Thunder Bay, Ontario. Despite its name, it is unrelated to the Persian empire.

== Regional variations ==
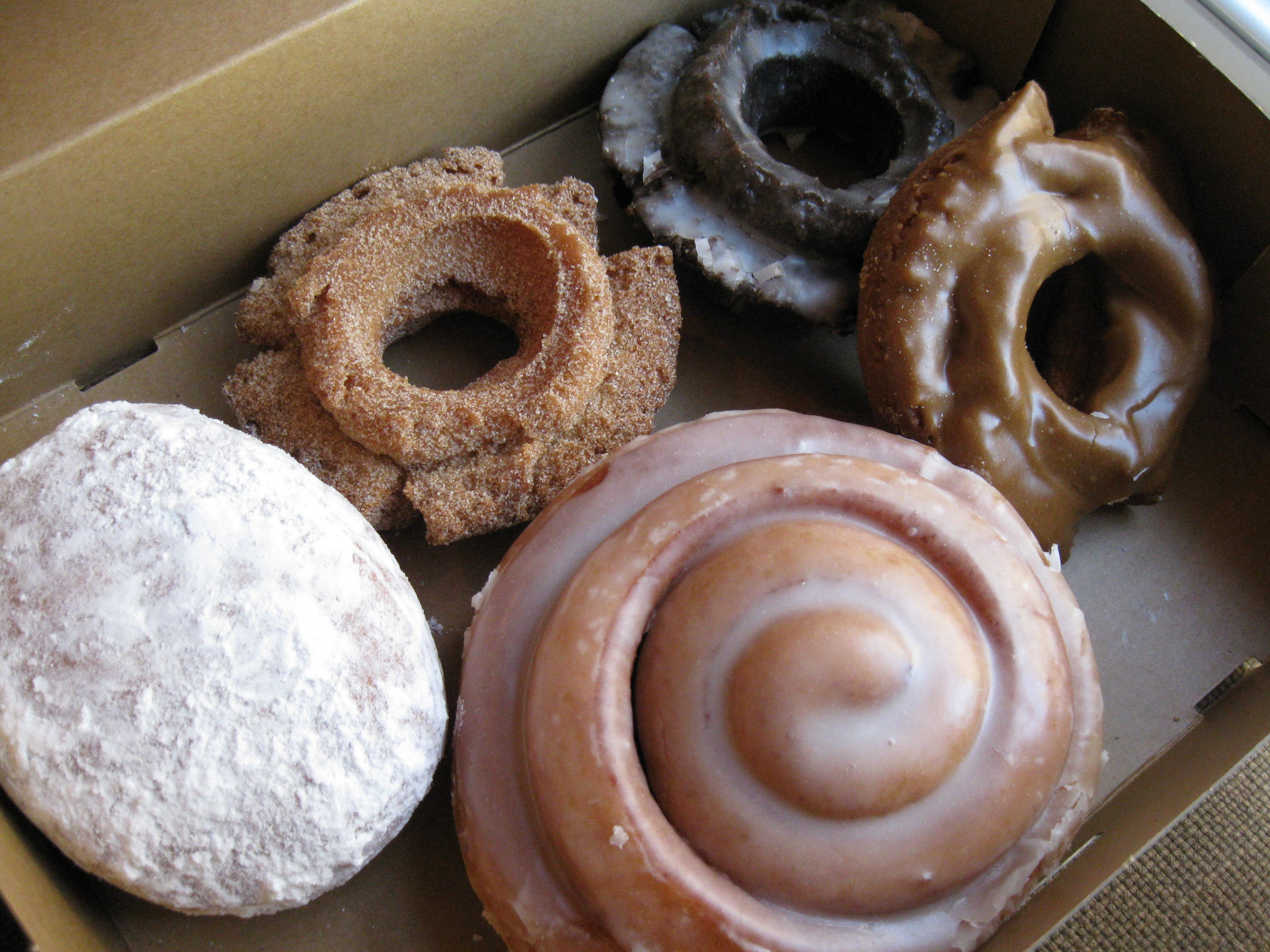
From left: Valley Girl Lemon, old fashioned doughnuts (cinnamon sugar, chocolate glazed, maple), Pershing (cinnamon roll)

In Thunder Bay, Ontario, Canada, it is said to have originated at Bennett's Bakery in Port Arthur, where it is served with a sweet, pink icing made of either raspberries or strawberries. Traditional lore is that the Persian was named for U.S. general John "Blackjack" Pershing but the exact date of its inception and circumstances of its creation are no longer known, giving rise to competing claims and stories. Its recipe remains a secret, with long-running debates on whether the icing contains raspberries or strawberries. Persians are often used as fundraising items to be sold at schools, churches, shopping malls, and other social events. They may be served "toasted" – sliced in half, heated in a frying pan and iced on both sides.

In Camden, Maine, they were historically made with chocolate frosting. In Lehighton, Pennsylvania, they were served with chocolate or vanilla icing with a dollop of cherry–strawberry glaze. Persian buns in Wisconsin can have white (vanilla) or chocolate frosting topped with crushed peanuts. A version is also sold as a "Pershing Donut" at Titus Bakery in Lebanon, Indiana.
