= Blatchford =

Blatchford, a surname, may refer to:

== People ==
- Christie Blatchford (1951–2020), Canadian newspaper columnist and broadcaster
- Claire Blatchford (born 1944), deaf American author
- Edgar Blatchford (born 1950), Alaska politician and newspaper publisher
- Edward Blatchford (born 1972), American actor known for his role in the television series Malibu, CA
- Eliphalet Wickes Blatchford (1826–1915), American manufacturer
- Howard Blatchford (1912–1943), Canadian flying ace in World War II
- Ian Blatchford (born 1965), British museum director
- Joseph Blatchford (1934–2020), founder of Accion International and third director of the United States Peace Corps (1969–1971)
- Kenny Blatchford (1882–1933), mayor of Edmonton, Alberta, and member of the Canadian House of Commons
- Liz Blatchford (born 1980), British professional triathlete
- Neil Blatchford (born 1945), American speed skater
- Olivia Blatchford (born 1993), American squash player
- Richard M. Blatchford (1859–1934), U.S. Army general in World War I
- Richard M. Blatchford (attorney) (1798–1875), American attorney, public official, and diplomat
- Robert Blatchford (1851–1943), British socialist campaigner and author
- Samuel Blatchford (1820–1893), Associate Justice of the Supreme Court of the United States
- Samuel Blatchford (university president), first president of Rensselaer Polytechnic Institute (1824–1828)
- Samuel Nathan Blatchford (1925–2005), American soldier and civil engineer, most decorated Native American veteran of World War II
- Torrington Blatchford (1871–1938), Australian geologist
- Winifred Blatchford (1882–1968), English magazine editor and book critic

== Other uses ==
- Blatchford Field, former site of Edmonton City Centre Airport (1927–2013)
- Blatchford, Edmonton, a planned community in Edmonton, Alberta, under development on the former Blatchford Field
- Glasgow-Blatchford score, a medical screening tool
- USS General R. M. Blatchford (AP-153)

== See also ==
- Blachford (disambiguation)
