= Crenshaw v. United States =

Blake v. United States
- Supreme Court of the United States

Argued January 6, 1890 Decided March 3, 1890
- Full case name: Crenshaw v. United States
- Citations: 134 U.S. 99 (more)

Holding
- Officers of the United States do not hold their office by contract and may be removed at anytime where authorized by law.

Court membership
- Chief Justice Melville Fuller Associate Justices Samuel F. Miller · Stephen J. Field; Joseph P. Bradley · John M. Harlan; Horace Gray · Samuel Blatchford; Lucius Q. C. Lamar II · David J. Brewer

Case opinion
- Majority: Lamar, joined by unanimous

Laws applied
- U.S. Const. art. II, § 2, cl. 2

Crenshaw v. United States, 134 U.S. 99 (1890), was a decision of the United States Supreme Court concerning the removal power under the Appointments Clause.
