= Richard M. Blatchford (attorney) =

American lawyer and politician (1798–1875)

Richard Milford Blatchford
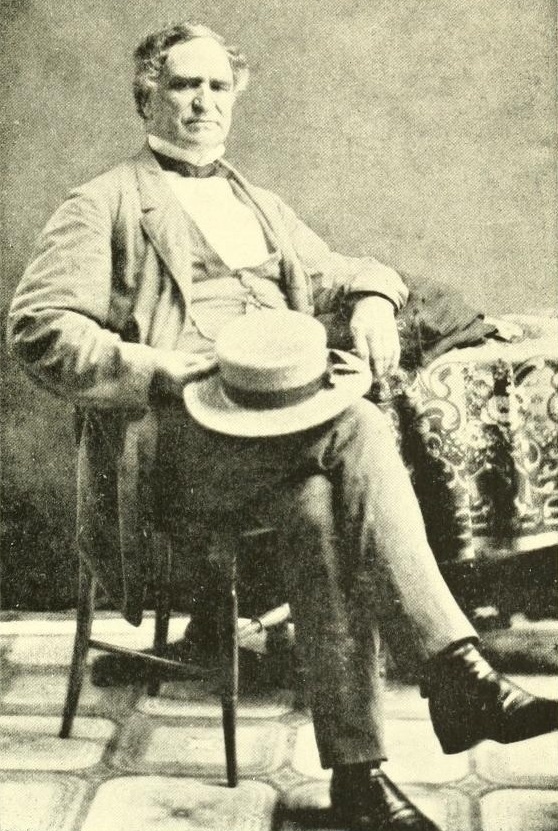
- Blatchford in New York, July 1859

U.S. Minister to the State of the Church
- In office August 9, 1862 – October 7, 1863
- President: Abraham Lincoln
- Preceded by: Alexander Randall
- Succeeded by: Rufus King

Member of the New York State Assembly from New York County's 13th District
- In office January 2, 1855 – December 31, 1855
- Preceded by: William Taylor
- Succeeded by: William A. Guest

Personal details
- Born: April 23, 1798 Stratford, Connecticut, U.S.
- Died: September 4, 1875 (aged 77) Newport, Rhode Island, U.S.
- Resting place: Green-Wood Cemetery, Brooklyn, New York, U.S.
- Party: Whig (before 1855); Republican
- Spouses: Julia Ann Mumford (m. 1819; died 1857) Angelica Hamilton (m. 1860; died 1868) Katherine Hone (m. 1870)
- Relations: Richard M. Blatchford (grandnephew)
- Children: 5, including Samuel Blatchford
- Parent(s): Samuel Blatchford; Alicia Windeatt Blatchford
- Education: Union College (BA)
- Profession: Attorney

Richard Milford Blatchford (April 23, 1798 – September 4, 1875) was an attorney and political figure in New York City. A longtime political and legal associate of college classmate William H. Seward, Blatchford is most notable for his service in the New York State Assembly and as U.S. Minister to the State of the Church. He was also the father of Samuel Blatchford, who served as an associate justice of the United States Supreme Court.

== Early life ==
Blatchford was born in Stratford, Connecticut on April 23, 1798. He was the ninth of seventeen children born to Reverend Samuel Blatchford and Alicia (née Windeatt) Blatchford.

Blatchford's grandnephew, also named Richard M. Blatchford, was a career officer in the United States Army. He attained the rank of major general, and was a veteran of the Spanish–American War and World War I.

He was educated in Connecticut and Lansingburgh, New York, and graduated from Union College in 1815. Blatchford maintained his association with Union College for the rest of his life. He was a member of the college's board of trustees, and received the honorary degree of LL.D. in 1864. He also served as a member of the board of visitors that oversaw management of the Knott Trust Fund, which college president, Eliphalet Nott, left for the school's benefit. In addition, Blatchford endowed Union College's Blatchford Oratorical Prizes, medals which were presented by faculty judges to the top student competitors at an annual speech making competition.

== Career ==
He taught school in Jamaica, Queens while studying law, and attained admission to the bar in 1820.

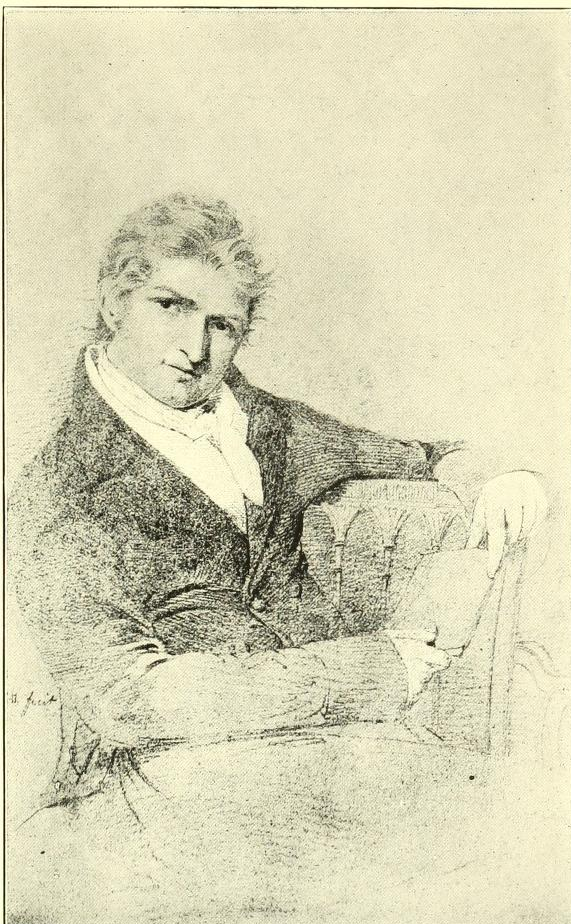
Pencil sketch of Blatchford c. 1820

Blatchford practiced law in Manhattan and Auburn, New York with fellow Union College student William H. Seward and other partners, and became a highly skilled corporation and banking attorney as one of the founders of the firm now known as Cravath, Swaine & Moore. In 1826 he was appointed U.S. counsel and agent for the Bank of England, and he served in the same capacity for the Second Bank of the United States. When the charter for the Bank of the United States expired in 1836, Blatchford was responsible for concluding all pending business and resolving all remaining obligations between the two institutions.

Blatchford was also a successful investor and businessman, and his holdings included New York City real estate, as well as land development ventures as far away as Florida. He also owned shares of stock in several companies, and by 1845, his net worth was over $200,000 (equivalent to $6,390,000 in 2024). He was a longtime friend of Daniel Webster, and was one of the executors of Webster's will.

Blatchford served on the boards of directors of several New York railroads that were subsequently consolidated to form the New York Central, including the Saratoga and Whitehall. After the mergers, he was appointed as a vice president and director of the consolidated company. In addition, he was a director of other corporations, including the North American Fire Insurance Company.

A Whig Party activist, Blatchford was affiliated with Seward in politics and was elected to the New York State Assembly in 1855. He served one term (the 78th session), and was chosen to act as Speaker pro tempore during the absence of Speaker DeWitt Clinton Littlejohn. Blatchford was also a trustee of Bellevue Hospital Medical College.

=== Public service ===
In 1859, Blatchford was appointed to the commission which oversaw creation and operation of New York City's Central Park, and he served until the implementation of a new city charter reorganized the municipal government in 1870; from 1860 to 1863 he was the commission's president. In 1872, he was appointed to the city parks commission, and he served until failing health caused him to resign in 1873.

Blatchford became a Republican when the party was founded in the mid-1850s. Because Congress was not in session at the start of the American Civil War, President Abraham Lincoln named Blatchford, John Adams Dix, and George Opdyke as commissioners of the Union Defense Committee, responsible to expend federal funds on presidential authority for the initial raising and equipping of troops that were mustered into the Union Army.

In August 1862, during the Lincoln Administration, Blatchford was appointed U.S. Minister to the State of the Church in Rome, succeeding Alexander Randall. He served until October 1863, and was succeeded by Rufus King.

Blatchford continued to practice law until ill health caused him to retire in the early 1870s.

== Personal life ==
In 1819, Blatchford married Julia Ann Mumford (1798–1857) of Schenectady, New York and New York City. Before his wife's death in 1857, Blatchford was the father of five children:

- Samuel Blatchford (1820–1893), who served as a Justice of the United States Supreme Court from 1882 to 1893.
- Mary Milford Blatchford (1823–1852), the wife of Burr Wakeman Griswold (1824–1886).
- Julia Alicia Blatchford (1830–1831), who died young.
- Julia Maria Blatchford (1834–1922), who married architect Edward Tuckerman Potter (1831–1904), a son of Bishop Alonzo Potter.
- Sophia Ethelinda Blatchford (1836–1908)

In 1860, Blatchford married Angelica Hamilton (1819–1868). Angelica was the daughter of James Alexander Hamilton and granddaughter of Elizabeth Schuyler Hamilton and Alexander Hamilton, the first Treasury Secretary. Angelica Hamilton died in 1868, and on January 18, 1870 Blatchford married Katherine Hone, the daughter of Philip Hone, a former New York City mayor.

Blatchford was robbed in an 1871 incident that made national headlines and was covered in the news again following his death. According to published accounts, he stopped at a fruit stand and set down a package so he could reach into his pocket for money to complete a purchase. As he did so, a thief tapped him on the shoulder; when Blatchford turned around, the thief or a confederate picked up the package and made an unnoticed getaway. The package contained $50,000 in negotiable securities (equivalent to $1,164,000 in 2024). The thief or thieves were never caught, and the securities were never recovered.

Blatchford died at his summer home in Newport, Rhode Island on September 4, 1875, and was buried at Green-Wood Cemetery in Brooklyn, Section 100, Lot 5643.

== Bibliography ==
- Blatchford, Eliphalet Wickes (1912). Blatchford Memorial II: A Genealogical Record of the Family of Rev. Samuel Blatchford, D.D. Chicago, IL: E.W. Blatchford.
- Castle, Frederick A. (1884). Second Decennial Catalogue of the Trustees, Faculty, Officers and of the Alumni of the Bellevue Hospital Medical College. New York: Alumni Association of Bellevue Hospital Medical College.
- Davis, Henry Blaine Jr. (1998). Generals in Khaki. Raleigh, NC: Pentland Press. ISBN 1571970886. OCLC 231779136.
- Denny, R. Breck (April 2, 2017). "Richard M. Blatchford" (PDF). New York Marble Cemetery – Interesting Ancestors. New York, NY: New York Marble Cemetery. Archived (PDF) from the original on 2018-02-01.
- Hannan, Caryn (2008). Connecticut Biographical Dictionary. Vol. 1, A–G. Hamburg, MI: State History Publications, LLC. ISBN 978-1878592729.
- McAdam, David; et al. (1897). History of the Bench and Bar of New York. Vol. I. New York, NY: New York History Company.
- New York State Assembly (1855). Journal of the Assembly of the State of New York at their Seventy-Eighth Session. Albany, NY: Charles Van Benthuysen.
- New York State Board of Railroad Commissioners (1860). Annual Report of the State Engineer and Surveyor (1860). Albany, NY: Weed, Parsons & Company.
- New York State Board of Railroad Commissioners (1867). Annual Report of the State Engineer and Surveyor (1867). Albany, NY: Weed, Parsons & Company.
- Raymond, Andrew Van Vranken (1907). Union University: Its History, Influence, Characteristics and Equipment, Volume III. New York: Lewis Publishing Company.
- Union University (1895). Union University: Centennial Catalog 1795–1895. Troy, NY: Troy Times Printing House.
- Union University (1915). Annual Catalogue of Union University 1915–1916. Albany, NY: Frank H. Evory & Co.
- United States Department of State (1935). Register of the Department of State. Washington, DC: U.S. Government Printing Office.
- University of the State of New York (1872). Eighty-Fifth Annual Report of the Regents of the University. Albany, NY: The Argus Company.
- "New York: A Most Daring Robbery". The Public Ledger. Memphis, TN. December 18, 1871 – via Newspapers.com.
- "Local Affairs: New York; Richard M. Blatchford". The Newport Daily News. Newport, RI. September 23, 1875 – via Newspapers.com.
