= Samuel Blatchford (university president) =

American academic administrator

Reverend Samuel Blatchford
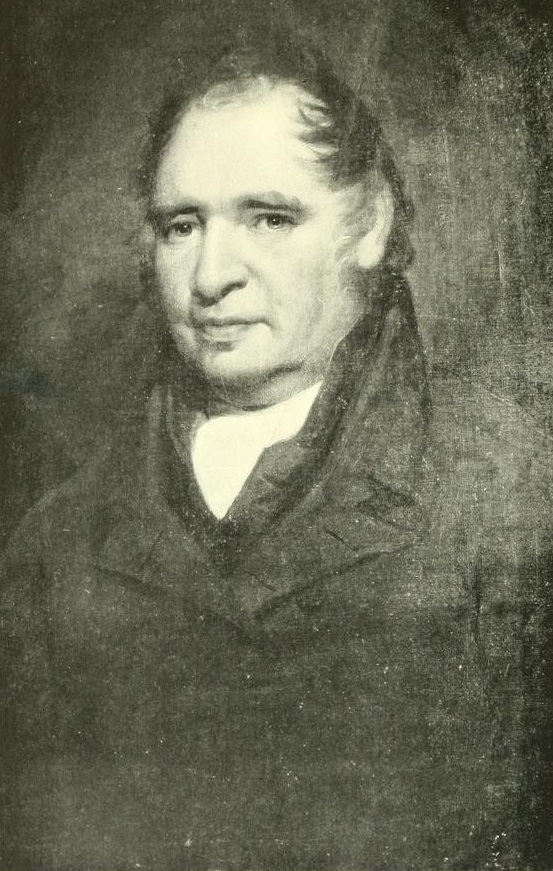
- Blatchford, from the frontispiece of the 1912 book Blatchford Memorial II

1st President of Rensselaer Polytechnic Institute
- In office 1824–1828
- Preceded by: Office created
- Succeeded by: John Chester

Personal details
- Born: August 1, 1767 Devonport, Devon, England
- Died: March 27, 1828 (aged 60) Lansingburgh, New York, U.S.
- Spouse: Alicia Windeatt (m. 1788)
- Children: 17
- Education: Dissenting College of Theology at Homerton, Cambridge

Ecclesiastical career
- Religion: Presbyterian
- Ordained: November 4, 1789

Samuel Blatchford (August 1, 1767 – March 17, 1828) was the first president of Rensselaer Polytechnic Institute.

== Early life ==
Blatchford was born in Devonport, Devon, England on August 1, 1767. He was the oldest of four children born to Henry Blatchford and, his second wife, Mary (nee Heath) Blatchford, who married in 1766. From his father's first marriage, he had an older half-brother, John Blatchford, "who was eminent for his piety." His younger siblings from his parents marriage were Jane Blatchford, Joseph Blatchford (who died aged five) and William Blatchford (who died in infancy).

He was educated at the Dissenting College of Theology at Homerton, now called Homerton College, Cambridge.

== Career ==
On November 4, 1789, he was ordained and became pastor of the Presbyterian Church in Kingsbridge, Devon. In 1791, he became pastor of the church in Topsham, Devon.

In 1795, Blatchford moved from England to the United States, where he became pastor of a church in Bedford, New York, and later pastor of a church in Bridgeport, Connecticut, and pastor of Greenfield Hill Congregational Church in Fairfield Connecticut. In 1804, he became pastor of the Presbyterian churches in Lansingburgh and Waterford (which later merged).

=== Educational career ===
Upon becoming pastor of the church in Lansingburgh, Blatchford was also asked to be principal of Lansingburgh Academy. In 1805, he was appointed a trustee of Union College and later a member of the Board of Examiners.

In 1824, Stephen Van Rensselaer appointed him trustee and the first president of the Rensselaer School, which grew to become Rensselaer Polytechnic Institute (RPI).

He was given an honorary master's degree by Yale College in 1798 and the honorary degree of Doctor of Divinity by Williams College in 1808.

== Personal life ==
On March 25, 1788, Blatchford was married to Alicia Windeatt (1767–1846), a daughter of Thomas Windeatt of Bridgetown, Totnes. Together, they were the parents of seventeen children, including:

- Henry Blatchford (1788–1822), a pastor of the Rehoboth and Manokin Presbyterian Churches.
- Mary Milford Windeatt Blatchford (1790–1847)
- Alicia Windeatt Blatchford (1791–1808).
- Thomas Windeatt Blatchford (1794–1866), who married Harriet Wickes (1789–1875).
- Harriet Peacock Blatchford (1795–1819).
- Samuel Milford Blatchford (1797–1864), who married Betsey Hunt Kellogg (1799–1873).
- Richard Milford Blatchford (1798–1875), a prominent attorney and politician in New York City.
- John Blatchford (1799–1855), who married Frances Wickes (1805–1875) and was the first pastor at the First Presbyterian Church, Chicago.
- Sophia Blatchford (1800–1875).
- Frederick Blatchford (1801–1883), who married Almira Capen Jones (1803–1865).
- George Edgecumb Blatchford (1803–1805), who died young.
- Charles Baynham Blatchford (1804–1804), who died young.
- Ethelinda Jane Blatchford (1805–1879), who married Pliny Moore Corbin (1801–1874).
- George Edgecumbe Blatchford (1807–1808), who died young.
- Edgecombe Heath Blatchford (1811–1853), who married Mary Ann Hubbard (1820–1864).

Blatchford died in Lansingburgh on March 27, 1828. Eliphalet Nott, the president of Union College and later the third president of RPI, delivered the sermon at the funeral services.

=== Descendants ===
Coat of Arms of Samuel Blatchford

Through his son Richard, he was the grandfather of Samuel Blatchford (1820–1893), an attorney and judge who became an Associate Justice of the Supreme Court of the United States.

Through his son Rev John Blatchford, he was the grandfather of Eliphalet Wickes Blatchford (May 31, 1826 – 1915).

A great-grandson, also named Richard M. Blatchford (1859–1934), was a career officer in the United States Army who attained the rank of major general, and was a veteran of the Spanish–American War and World War I.

Academic offices
New institution	President of Rensselaer Polytechnic Institute; 1824 – 1828	Succeeded by John Chester
