= Nathan S. S. Beman =

American academic administrator

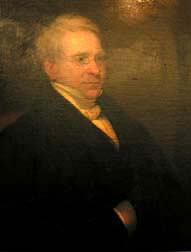
Nathan S.S. Beman

Nathan Sidney Smith Beman (1785–1871) was the fourth president of Rensselaer Polytechnic Institute. He was born in what is now New Lebanon, New York, on November 26, 1785. He graduated from Middlebury College in 1807. He then studied theology and preached in Portland, Maine, and Sparta, Georgia. In 1818, he became president of Franklin College in Athens, Georgia, which was the founding college of the University of Georgia, although he only served a year in that position. He then returned to preaching in Sparta, Georgia, at Mount Zion Presbyterian Church until 1822, when he became pastor of the First Presbyterian Church in Troy, New York.

In 1824, he became a trustee of Middlebury College, a position he maintained until his death. (He was also elected president of Middlebury College in 1846 but declined the position.) He received a doctor of divinity from Williams College in 1824 and a doctor of laws from Middlebury College in 1852. He was a vice president of Rensselaer Polytechnic Institute from 1842 until 1845, when he was elected president. He continued as president of RPI until 1865. He died on August 6, 1871, in Carbondale, Illinois, at the age of 86. Beman Park, located just north of the RPI campus, is named in his honor.

Academic offices
Preceded by Eliphalet Nott	President of Rensselaer Polytechnic Institute; 1845 – 1865	Succeeded by John F. Winslow
