= List of United States Supreme Court cases, volume 134 =

Supreme Court of the United States
- Interactive map of Supreme Court of the United States
- 38°53′26″N 77°00′16″W
- Established: March 4, 1789; 237 years ago
- Location: Washington, D.C.
- Coordinates: 38°53′26″N 77°00′16″W
- Composition method: Presidential nomination with Senate confirmation
- Authorised by: Constitution of the United States, Art. III, § 1
- Judge term length: life tenure, subject to impeachment and removal
- Number of positions: 9 (by statute)
- Website: supremecourt.gov

This is a list of cases reported in volume 134 of United States Reports, decided by the Supreme Court of the United States in 1890.

== Justices of the Supreme Court at the time of volume 134 U.S. ==
The Supreme Court is established by Article III, Section 1 of the Constitution of the United States, which says: "The judicial Power of the United States, shall be vested in one supreme Court . . .". The size of the Court is not specified; the Constitution leaves it to Congress to set the number of justices. Under the Judiciary Act of 1789 Congress originally fixed the number of justices at six (one chief justice and five associate justices). Since 1789 Congress has varied the size of the Court from six to seven, nine, ten, and back to nine justices (always including one chief justice).

When the cases in volume 134 U.S. were decided the Court comprised the following nine members:

Portrait	Justice	Office	Home State	Succeeded	Date confirmed by the Senate (Vote)	Tenure on Supreme Court
	Melville Fuller	Chief Justice	Illinois	Morrison Waite	July 20, 1888 (41–20)	October 8, 1888 – July 4, 1910 (Died)
	Samuel Freeman Miller	Associate Justice	Iowa	Peter Vivian Daniel	July 16, 1862 (Acclamation)	July 21, 1862 – October 13, 1890 (Died)
	Stephen Johnson Field	Associate Justice	California	newly created seat	March 10, 1863 (Acclamation)	May 10, 1863 – December 1, 1897 (Retired)
	Joseph P. Bradley	Associate Justice	New Jersey	newly created seat	March 21, 1870 (46–9)	March 23, 1870 – January 22, 1892 (Died)
	John Marshall Harlan	Associate Justice	Kentucky	David Davis	November 29, 1877 (Acclamation)	December 10, 1877 – October 14, 1911 (Died)
	Horace Gray	Associate Justice	Massachusetts	Nathan Clifford	December 20, 1881 (51–5)	January 9, 1882 – September 15, 1902 (Died)
	Samuel Blatchford	Associate Justice	New York	Ward Hunt	March 22, 1882 (Acclamation)	April 3, 1882 – July 7, 1893 (Died)
	Lucius Quintus Cincinnatus Lamar	Associate Justice	Mississippi	William Burnham Woods	January 16, 1888 (32–28)	January 18, 1888 – January 23, 1893 (Died)
	David Josiah Brewer	Associate Justice	Kansas	Stanley Matthews	December 18, 1889 (53–11)	January 6, 1890 – March 28, 1910 (Died)

== Notable Case in 134 U.S. ==
=== Hans v. Louisiana ===
In Hans v. Louisiana, 134 U.S. 1 (1890), the Supreme Court held that the Eleventh Amendment prohibits a citizen of a U.S. state from suing their own state in a federal court. The Court suggested that the framers of the Constitution had not addressed the possibility of a citizen suing his own state because such a thing would simply be inconceivable to them. At the time the Constitution was written, states had always been immune from such suits, unless the state itself consented to be sued. Furthermore, the Judiciary Acts of 1789 and 1802 had granted the federal courts jurisdiction "concurrent with the courts of the several states," indicating that Congress had not contemplated the possibility that the federal courts would have any powers unknown to the state courts.

== Citation style ==
Under the Judiciary Act of 1789 the federal court structure at the time comprised District Courts, which had general trial jurisdiction; Circuit Courts, which had mixed trial and appellate (from the US District Courts) jurisdiction; and the United States Supreme Court, which had appellate jurisdiction over the federal District and Circuit courts—and for certain issues over state courts. The Supreme Court also had limited original jurisdiction (i.e., in which cases could be filed directly with the Supreme Court without first having been heard by a lower federal or state court). There were one or more federal District Courts and/or Circuit Courts in each state, territory, or other geographical region.

Bluebook citation style is used for case names, citations, and jurisdictions.

- "C.C.D." = United States Circuit Court for the District of . . .
  - e.g.,"C.C.D.N.J." = United States Circuit Court for the District of New Jersey
- "D." = United States District Court for the District of . . .
  - e.g.,"D. Mass." = United States District Court for the District of Massachusetts
- "E." = Eastern; "M." = Middle; "N." = Northern; "S." = Southern; "W." = Western
  - e.g.,"C.C.S.D.N.Y." = United States Circuit Court for the Southern District of New York
  - e.g.,"M.D. Ala." = United States District Court for the Middle District of Alabama
- "Ct. Cl." = United States Court of Claims
- The abbreviation of a state's name alone indicates the highest appellate court in that state's judiciary at the time.
  - e.g.,"Pa." = Supreme Court of Pennsylvania
  - e.g.,"Me." = Supreme Judicial Court of Maine

== List of cases in volume 134 U.S. ==
Case Name	Page & year	Opinion of the Court	Concurring opinion(s)	Dissenting opinion(s)	Lower Court	Disposition
Hans v. Louisiana	1 (1890)	Bradley	Harlan	none	C.C.E.D. La.	affirmed
North Carolina v. Temple	22 (1890)	Bradley	none	Harlan	C.C.E.D.N.C.	reversed
Eilenbecker v. Plymouth Cnty.	31 (1890)	Miller	none	none	Iowa	affirmed
McCormick H.M. Co. v. Walthers	41 (1890)	Fuller	none	none	C.C.D. Neb.	affirmed
Richmond & D.R.R. Co. v. Thouron	45 (1890)	Fuller	none	none	C.C.E.D. Tenn.	dismissed
Ormsby v. Webb	47 (1890)	Harlan	none	none	Sup. Ct. D.C.	affirmed
Cheney v. Libby	68 (1890)	Harlan	none	none	C.C.D. Neb.	affirmed
McKey v. Village of Hyde Park	84 (1890)	Lamar	none	none	C.C.N.D. Ill.	reversed
Crenshew v. United States	99 (1890)	Lamar	none	none	Ct. Cl.	affirmed
Gunther v. Liverpool et al. Co.	110 (1890)	Gray	none	none	C.C.E.D.N.Y.	affirmed
Kenaday v. Edwards	117 (1890)	Harlan	none	none	Sup. Ct. D.C.	affirmed
Bryan v. Kales	126 (1890)	Harlan	Field	none	Sup. Ct. Terr. Ariz.	reversed
In re Wight	136 (1890)	Miller	none	Fuller	C.C.E.D. Mich.	affirmed
McMurray v. Moran	150 (1890)	Harlan	none	none	C.C.D. Nev.	multiple
In re Medley	160 (1890)	Miller	none	Brewer	Colo. Dist. Ct.	conviction vacated
In re Savage	176 (1890)	Miller	none	none	Colo. Dist. Ct.	conviction vacated
Jefferis v. East Omaha L. Co.	178 (1890)	Blatchford	none	none	C.C.D. Neb.	affirmed
Hill v. City of Memphis	198 (1890)	Field	none	none	C.C.E.D. Mo.	affirmed
Tracy v. Tuffly	206 (1890)	Harlan	none	none	C.C.E.D. Tex.	affirmed
Louisiana ex rel. New York et al. Co. v. Steele	230 (1890)	Bradley	none	none	La.	affirmed
Bell's Gap R.R. Co. v. Pennsylvania	232 (1890)	Bradley	none	none	Pa.	affirmed
City of Chester v. Pennsylvania	240 (1890)	Bradley	none	none	Pa.	affirmed
Deputron v. Young	241 (1890)	Fuller	none	none	C.C.D. Neb.	affirmed
Henderson B. Co. v. McGrath	260 (1890)	Lamar	none	none	C.C.D. Ind.	affirmed
Chicago et al. Co. v. Third Nat'l Bank	276 (1890)	Brewer	none	none	C.C.N.D. Ill.	affirmed
Banigan v. Bard	291 (1890)	Miller	none	none	C.C.D. Conn.	affirmed
Toledo et al. R.R. Co. v. Hamilton	296 (1890)	Brewer	none	none	C.C.N.D. Ohio	reversed
De Witt v. Berry Bros.	306 (1890)	Lamar	none	none	C.C.S.D.N.Y.	affirmed
Arndt v. Griggs	316 (1890)	Brewer	none	none	C.C.D. Neb.	reversed
Evans v. State Nat'l Bank	330 (1890)	Fuller	none	none	C.C.E.D. La.	dismissal denied
Macon Cnty. v. Huidekoper	332 (1890)	Field	none	none	C.C.W.D. Mo.	affirmed
Gormley v. Clark	338 (1890)	Fuller	none	none	C.C.N.D. Ill.	affirmed
Penfield v. Chesapeake et al. R.R. Co.	351 (1890)	Harlan	none	none	C.C.E.D.N.Y.	affirmed
Clough v. Curtis	361 (1890)	Harlan	none	none	Sup. Ct. Terr. Idaho	affirmed
In re Loney	372 (1890)	Gray	none	none	C.C.E.D. Va.	affirmed
In re Green	377 (1890)	Gray	none	none	C.C.E.D. Va.	reversed
Pohl v. Anchor B. Co.	381 (1890)	Blatchford	none	none	C.C.S.D.N.Y.	reversed
Howe M. Co. v. National N. Co.	388 (1890)	Fuller	none	none	C.C.D. Mass.	affirmed
Glenn v. Fant	398 (1890)	Fuller	none	none	Sup. Ct. D.C.	affirmed
G.H. Hammond & Co. v. Hastings	401 (1890)	Brewer	none	none	C.C.N.D. Ill.	reversed
Schreyer v. Scott	405 (1890)	Brewer	none	none	C.C.S.D.N.Y.	reversed
Chicago, Milwaukee & St. Paul Railway Co. v. Minnesota	418 (1890)	Blatchford	Miller	Bradley	Minn.	reversed
Minneapolis E. Ry. Co. v. Minnesota	467 (1890)	Blatchford	none	none	Minn.	reversed
United States v. Jones	483 (1890)	Lamar	none	none	Ct. Cl.	affirmed
In re Louisville U'writers	488 (1890)	Gray	none	none	E.D. La.	prohibition denied
Hathaway v. First Nat'l Bank	494 (1890)	Blatchford	none	none	C.C.D. Mass.	affirmed
Elwell v. Fosdick	500 (1890)	Blatchford	none	none	C.C.N.D. Ill.	dismissed
Small v. Northern P.R.R. Co.	514 (1890)	Fuller	none	none	C.C.D. Minn.	dismissed
Hill v. Merchants' M. Ins. Co.	515 (1890)	Harlan	none	none	Mo.	affirmed
Whittemore v. Amoskeag Nat'l Bank	527 (1890)	Fuller	none	none	C.C.D.N.H.	reversed
Brown v. Lake S.I. Co.	530 (1890)	Brewer	none	none	C.C.N.D. Ohio	affirmed
Wheeler v. Cloyd	537 (1890)	Lamar	none	none	C.C.S.D. Ill.	dismissed
Little v. Bowers	547 (1890)	Lamar	none	none	N.J.	dismissed
Mendenhall v. Hall	559 (1890)	Harlan	none	none	C.C.W.D. La.	reversed
Lee v. Simpson	572 (1890)	Blatchford	none	none	C.C.D.S.C.	affirmed
Home Ins. Co. v. New York	594 (1890)	Field	none	Miller	N.Y. Sup. Ct.	affirmed
Blount v. Walker	607 (1890)	Fuller	none	none	S.C.	dismissed
Louisville & N.R.R. Co. v. Woodson	614 (1890)	Fuller	none	none	Tenn.	affirmed
United States v. Lacher	624 (1890)	Fuller	none	none	C.C.S.D.N.Y.	certification
Rich v. Town of Mentz	632 (1890)	Fuller	none	none	C.C.N.D.N.Y.	affirmed
Giles v. Little	645 (1890)	Gray	none	none	Neb.	dismissed
Kingsbury v. Buckner	650 (1890)	Harlan	none	none	C.C.N.D. Ill.	affirmed
Leavenworth Cnty. v. Chicago et al. Ry. Co.	688 (1890)	Blatchford	none	none	C.C.W.D. Mo.	affirmed
