= SS Samuel Blatchford =

Liberty ship of WWII

History

United States
- Name: Samuel Blatchford
- Namesake: Samuel Blatchford
- Owner: War Shipping Administration (WSA)
- Operator: Agwilines Inc.
- Ordered: as type (EC2-S-C1) hull, MCE hull 937
- Awarded: 30 January 1942
- Builder: Bethlehem-Fairfield Shipyard, Baltimore, Maryland
- Cost: $1,073,858
- Yard number: 2087
- Way number: 4
- Laid down: 15 December 1942
- Launched: 6 February 1943
- Sponsored by: Mrs. L. T. Gray
- Completed: 23 February 1943
- Identification: Call sign: KKAH
- Fate: Laid up in Reserve Fleet, 24 September 1948, sold for scrap 10 October 1969

General characteristics
- Class & type: Liberty ship; type EC2-S-C1, standard
- Tonnage: 10,865 LT DWT; 7,176 GRT
- Displacement: 3,380 long tons (3,434 t) (light); 14,245 long tons (14,474 t) (max)
- Length: 441 feet 6 inches (135 m) oa; 416 feet (127 m) pp; 427 feet (130 m) lwl
- Beam: 57 feet (17 m)
- Draft: 27 ft 9.25 in (8.4646 m)
- Installed power: 2 × Oil fired 450 °F (232 °C) boilers, operating at 220 psi (1,500 kPa); 2,500 hp (1,900 kW)
- Propulsion: 1 × triple-expansion steam engine, (manufactured by General Machinery Corp., Hamilton, Ohio); 1 × screw propeller
- Speed: 11.5 knots (21.3 km/h; 13.2 mph)
- Capacity: 562,608 cubic feet (15,931 m^{3}) (grain); 499,573 cubic feet (14,146 m^{3}) (bale)
- Complement: 38–62 USMM; 21–40 USNAG
- Armament: Varied by ship; Bow-mounted 3-inch (76 mm)/50-caliber gun; Stern-mounted 4-inch (102 mm)/50-caliber gun; 2–8 × single 20-millimeter (0.79 in) Oerlikon anti-aircraft (AA) cannons and/or, 2–8 × 37-millimeter (1.46 in) M1 AA guns

SS Samuel Blatchford was a Liberty ship built in the United States during World War II. She was named after Samuel Blatchford, an American attorney and judge who served as an Associate Justice of the Supreme Court of the United States from 3 April 1882, until his death on 7 July 1893.

== Construction ==
Samuel Blatchford was laid down on 15 December 1942, under a Maritime Commission (MARCOM) contract, MCE hull 937, by the Bethlehem-Fairfield Shipyard, Baltimore, Maryland; she was sponsored by Mrs. L. T. Gray, and launched on 6 February 1943.

== History ==
She was allocated to the Agwilines Inc., on 23 February 1943.

On 23 September 1948, she was laid up in the National Defense Reserve Fleet, in Mobile, Alabama. On 22 October 1948, she was damaged while transiting through the Tensas River bridge. On 10 October 1969, she was sold for $43,216.54, to Union Minerals & Alloys Corp., to be scrapped. On 27 October 1969, she was withdrawn from the fleet.

== Bibliography ==
- "Bethlehem-Fairfield, Baltimore MD". www.ShipbuildingHistory.com. 7 August 2021.
- Maritime Administration. "Samuel Blatchford". Ship History Database Vessel Status Card. U.S. Department of Transportation, Maritime Administration.
- Davies, James (May 2004). "Specifications (As-Built)" (PDF). p. 23.
- "SS Samuel Blatchford".
