= Chicago, Milwaukee & St. Paul Railway Co. v. Minnesota =

Chicago, Milwaukee & St. Paul Railway Company v. Minnesota
- Supreme Court of the United States

Argued January 13–14, 1890 Decided March 24, 1890
- Full case name: Chicago, Milwaukee, St. Paul and Pacific Railroad Company v. State of Minnesota ex rel. Railroad and Warehouse Commission
- Citations: 134 U.S. 418 (more) 10 S. Ct. 462; 33 L. Ed. 970; 1890 U.S. LEXIS 1984

Holding
- Procedural due process applies to state regulatory action.

Court membership
- Chief Justice Melville Fuller Associate Justices Samuel F. Miller · Stephen J. Field; Joseph P. Bradley · John M. Harlan; Horace Gray · Samuel Blatchford; Lucius Q. C. Lamar II · David J. Brewer

Case opinions
- Majority: Blatchford, joined by Fuller, Field, Harlan, Brewer
- Concurrence: Miller
- Dissent: Bradley, joined by Gray, Lamar

Chicago, Milwaukee & St. Paul Railway Company v. Minnesota, 134 U.S. 418 (1890), was a case in which the Supreme Court of the United States held that procedural due process limits state regulatory power over railroad rates. A regulatory agency in Minnesota had set railroad rates that the Minnesota Supreme Court had refused to overturn. When the Chicago, Milwaukee, St. Paul and Pacific Railroad appealed the case, the U.S. Supreme Court found that the rates were set without due process of law, specifically without an opportunity to challenge the equality and reasonableness of the charges. The Minnesota court had sanctioned rate-setting without any judicial hearing, requirement of notice or witnesses, "-in fact, nothing which has the semblance of due process of law".

The court rejected the railroad's argument that the state's contract with the Minnesota railroad line, as it existed in prior state-chartered companies that the railroad later bought, remained in force against state law. Instead, they found that the state's right to regulate industry could not be forfeited except by an explicit declaration in law. However, this issue was subsumed by the court's broader decision regarding due process.

Justice Bradley dissented from the decision, arguing that it practically overturned Munn v. Illinois and other railroad cases that left states to decide toll rates. He indicated that it was the province of the states to decide the policy question of railroad rates, and not that of the judiciary.

== See also ==
- List of United States Supreme Court cases, volume 134
