= Blachford =

Blachford may refer to:

- Cecil Blachford (1880–1965), Canadian professional ice hockey forward
- Rogers baronets, of Wisdome in the County of Devon (also known as the Blachford baronets)
- Frederic Rogers, 1st Baron Blachford (1811–1889), British civil servant
- Karen Blachford (born 1966), Canadian wheelchair curler, 2006 Paralympics champion
- Mary Tighe (née Blackford or Blanchford: 1772–1810), Anglo-Irish poet.
- Blachford Lake, a remote lake in Northern Canada, near Yellowknife
- County of Blachford, a cadastral division in South Australia

== See also ==
- Blatchford (disambiguation)
