= John Chester (university president) =

American academic administrator and minister

John Chester (August 17, 1785 – January 12, 1829) was the second president of Rensselaer Polytechnic Institute.

== Biography ==
He was born in Wethersfield, Connecticut, in August 1785. He was the son of John and Elizabeth Chester. He graduated from Yale College in 1804. He studied theology under Dr. Joseph Lyman of Hatfield, Massachusetts, and received a license to preach in 1807 from the Hartford Association College. He first preached in several towns in Massachusetts and Connecticut and then moved to New York State, where he first preached in Cooperstown, New York, and between 1810 and 1815, in Hudson, New York. Chester was elected a member of the American Antiquarian Societyin 1814. In 1815, he moved to Albany, New York, where he was pastor of the Second Presbyterian Church. He was a founder and an early president of the Albany Female Academy, which became the Albany Academy for Girls and was also a trustee of The Albany Academy. He received the degree of Doctor of Divinity in 1821 from Union College. He was appointed president of Rensselaer on June 25, 1828. He died in Philadelphia on January 12, 1829.

== Archival collections ==
The Presbyterian Historical Society in Philadelphia, Pennsylvania, has papers related to John Chester in its holdings. The papers include an 1821 letter to J. Romeyn Beck and a letter of introduction for Erastus Colton.

Academic offices
Preceded by Rev. Dr. Samuel Blatchford	President of Rensselaer Polytechnic Institute; 1828 – 1829	Succeeded by Eliphalet Nott
