= Richard M. Blatchford =

United States Army general (1859–1934)

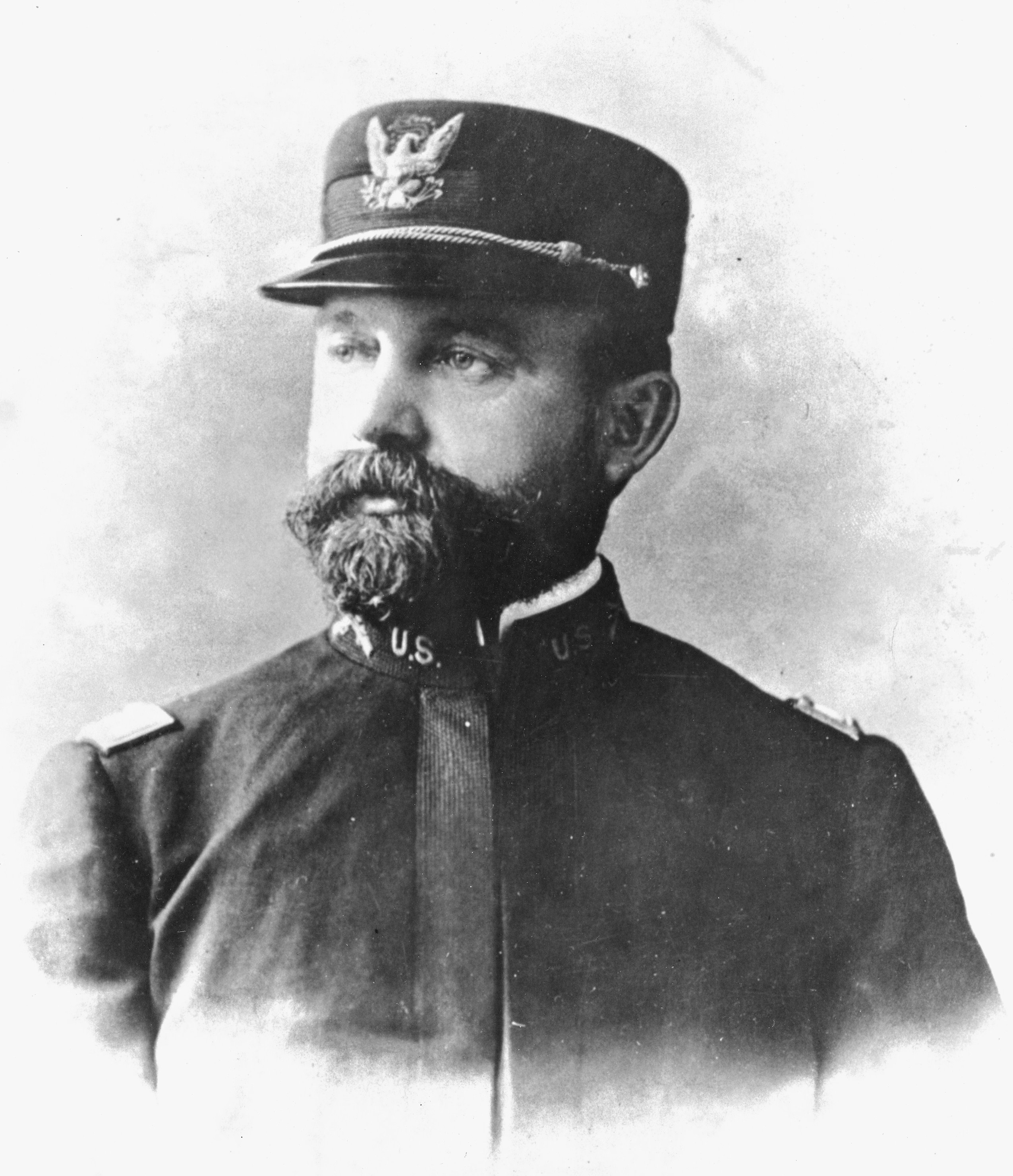
- Richard M. Blatchford, c. 1895–1900
- Born: August 17, 1859; Fort Hamilton, New York, US
- Died: August 31, 1934 (aged 75); San Francisco, California, US
- Burial place: San Francisco National Cemetery
- Education: Rensselaer Polytechnic Institute
- Spouses: Natalie Cary Green (m. 1887–1913); Elinor Hall (m. 1921–1934)
- Relatives: Samuel Blatchford (great-grandfather); Richard Milford Blatchford (great-uncle); Samuel Blatchford (cousin)
- Military career
- Allegiance: United States
- Branch: United States Army
- Service years: 1883–1922
- Rank: Major General
- Service number: 0-46
- Unit: U.S. Army Infantry Branch
- Commands: 11th Infantry Regiment; 12th Infantry Regiment; Army School of Musketry; Line of Communications, American Expeditionary Forces; 158th Depot Brigade; Panama Canal Department; Presidio of San Francisco; 8th Infantry Brigade and Camp Lewis; 5th Infantry Brigade and Vancouver Barracks
- Conflicts: Spanish–American War; Philippine–American War; Mexican Border War; World War I (Western Front)

Coat of Arms of Richard M. Blatchford

Richard Milford Blatchford (August 17, 1859 – August 31, 1934) was a career officer in the United States Army. A veteran of the Spanish–American War, Philippine–American War, Pancho Villa Expedition, and World War I, he attained the rank of major general. He was most notable for his command of the American Expeditionary Forces Line of Communications in France during World War I and his post-war command of the Panama Canal Department.

A native of Fort Hamilton, New York and a member of a family prominent in law, politics, religion, and academia, Blatchford attended Williston Seminary and Claverack College, and was an 1882 graduate of Rensselaer Polytechnic Institute. After graduating, Blatchford successfully applied for a commission as a second lieutenant in the 11th Infantry Regiment. At the start of his career, Blatchford served with his regiment on the western frontier, including postings to Dakota Territory, Kansas, and Arizona.

Blatchford was promoted to captain in 1898 and during the Spanish–American War he served two tours of duty in Puerto Rico. During the Philippine–American War, Blatchford served for three years in both field and garrison assignments. During the Mexican Border War, he commanded the 12th Infantry Regiment in Arizona and arranged the August 1914 peace conference between U.S. commander John J. Pershing and Mexican generals Pancho Villa and Álvaro Obregón.

During World War I, Blatchford received promotions to brigadier general and major general, and commanded the Line of Communications for the American Expeditionary Forces in France. His unsatisfactory performance in this role led to his return to the United States, where he commanded the 158th Depot Brigade. After the war, Blatchford commanded the Panama Canal Department, Presidio of San Francisco, 8th Infantry Brigade and Camp Lewis, and 5th Infantry Brigade and Vancouver Barracks before retiring in 1922. He died in San Francisco on August 31, 1934, and was buried at San Francisco National Cemetery.

== Early life and education ==
Richard Milford Blatchford was born at Fort Hamilton, New York on August 17, 1859, He was the son of Samuel T. Blatchford (1822–1886) and Agnes Leadbeater Blatchford (1824–1911), and his ancestors had come from Devonshire, England in the eighteenth century. His great-grandfather was Reverend Samuel Blatchford, his great-uncle was the New York attorney Richard Milford Blatchford, and the U.S. Supreme Court Justice Samuel Blatchford was a cousin.

He was educated at Williston Seminary in Massachusetts and Claverack College in New York, and graduated from Rensselaer Polytechnic Institute with the class of 1882. He was also an 1887 graduate of the Infantry and Cavalry School at Fort Leavenworth, and in 1912 he graduated from the Army War College, then in Washington, D.C.

== Military career ==
=== Start of career ===
Blatchford was commissioned in the United States Army directly from civil life and appointed as a second lieutenant in October 1883. He served with the 11th Infantry Regiment on the American frontier in Dakota Territory, Kansas, and Arizona.

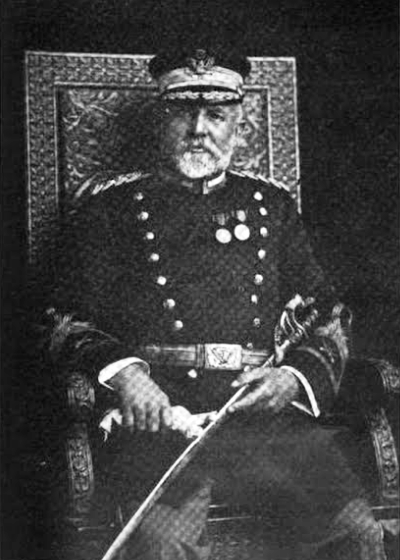
Colonel Blatchford, c. 1915

He became a captain on April 26, 1898, during the first days of the Spanish–American War. Following two tours of duty in Puerto Rico, he served in the Philippines from 1901 to 1904, taking part in the Philippine–American War in both field and garrison assignments with the 28th, 11th, and 6th Regiments.

After a brief tour as a recruiter in New York, Blatchford was an instructor and inspector for the Missouri National Guard. He served with the 11th Infantry Regiment almost continuously while rising through the ranks, and in April 1913 he was promoted to colonel and assigned to command of the regiment in Texas City, Texas.

=== Continued career ===
In 1914, Blatchford was assigned to command the 12th Infantry Regiment, then stationed at the Presidio of San Francisco. Blatchford's regiment, a part of the 8th Brigade under Brigadier General John J. Pershing, included 700 enlisted men and 30 commissioned officers. In April 1914, while on training maneuvers near Stanford University, Blatchford received orders for his regiment to travel with Pershing by rail to El Paso, Texas, where Pershing assembled the brigade to take part in the Mexican Border War. The regiment was later stationed at Nogales, Arizona, where Blatchford made arrangements for Pershing's August 29, 1914 peace conference with Mexican generals Pancho Villa and Álvaro Obregón.

While commanding the 12th, Blatchford organized a regimental school of musketry at the Presidio. By late 1915, Blatchford had been detailed as commandant of the Army's School of Musketry (today's Infantry School) at Fort Sill, Oklahoma. Blatchford was serving as commandant in April 1917, when America officially entered World War I.

=== World War I ===
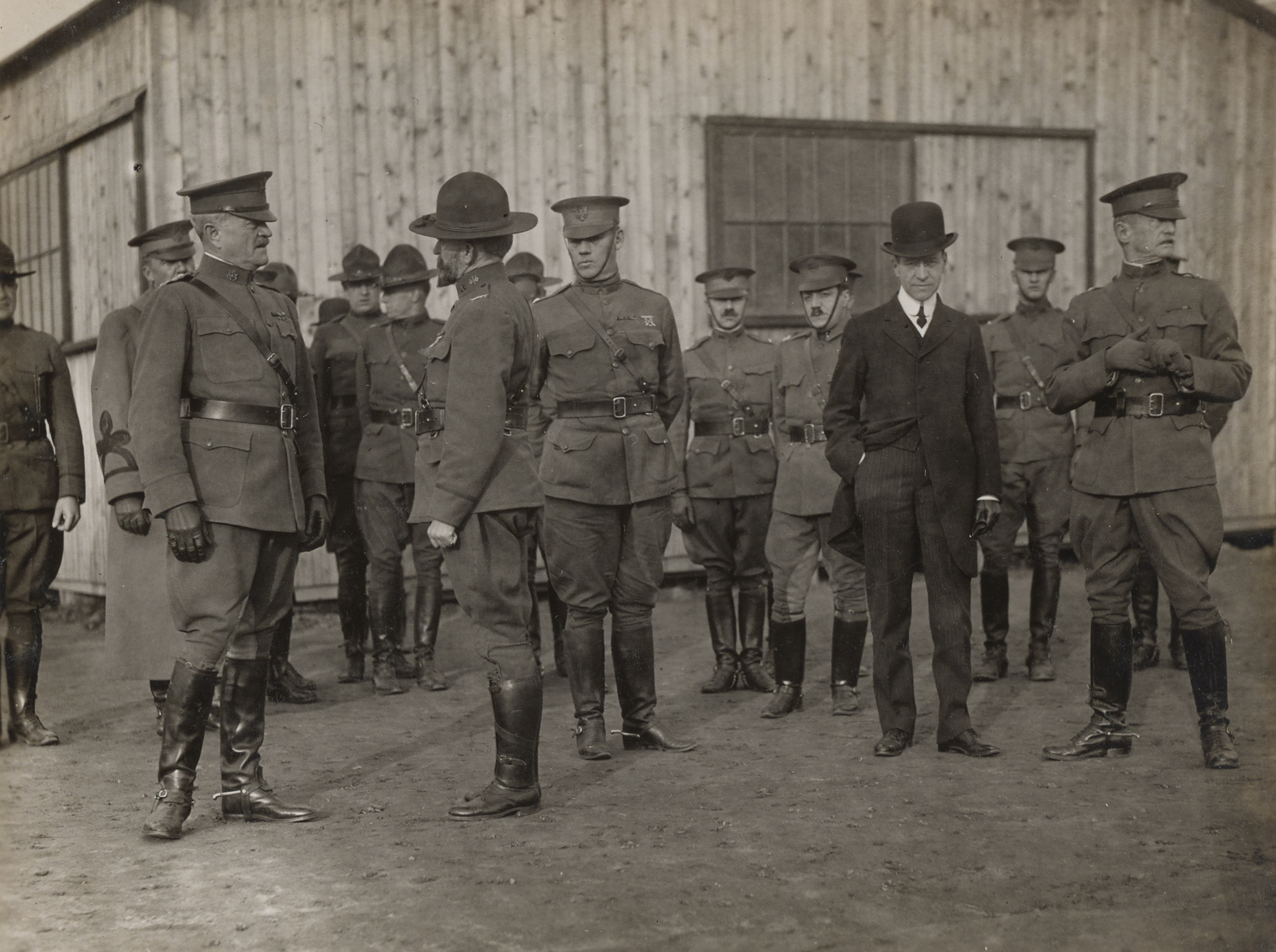
Secretary of War Newton D. Baker, General Pershing and other officers, including Major General Richard M. Blatchford, inspecting Rest Camp No. 1 at Saint-Nazaire, France, March 1918.

On May 15 Blatchford was promoted to brigadier general in the National Army. He sailed for France in July to observe trench warfare and Allied training methods, and on July 25 he was appointed commanding general of the Line of Communications, part of the American Expeditionary Forces (AEF), the commander of which was Pershing, an old friend and now a major general in command of the AEF.

On August 5, he received another promotion, this time to major general in the National Army. Blatchford failed to organize a functioning line of communication in France, resulting in inadequate transport of supplies to U.S. troops. Unhappy with his performance, Pershing decided to replace Blatchford with Brigadier General Francis J. Kernan.

After being relieved of his command in Paris, Blatchford took charge of billeting at Neufchâteau. According to Colonel Johnson Hagood, this job "certainly did not warrant a special headquarters with a major general in command," but Blatchford maintained a large staff for allocating billets and office space, including a colonel in charge of constructing new buildings.

In November 1917, Pershing sent Blatchford back to the United States. To spare his feelings and reputation, Pershing, now a full general, told him he was needed to train a combat unit and then lead it to France to take part in the fighting. Blatchford later viewed this removal as a stain on his career and pursued the matter with Pershing after the war. In response, Pershing wrote that Blatchford's performance had in fact been unsatisfactory, and that their "lifelong friendship" had caused Pershing to refrain from telling him so at the time.

=== Post-World War I ===
Despite being replaced as head of the Line of Communications, Blatchford's career flourished after his return from France. He briefly commanded the 158th Depot Brigade at Camp Sherman, Ohio (1917–1918), before taking command of the Panama Canal Department. He remained in command at the Panama Canal Zone through 1919, continuing after the end of the war. He later commanded the Presidio of San Francisco (1920–1921), 8th Infantry Brigade and Camp Lewis (1921), the Ninth Corps Area (March 1921 to June 1921), and 5th Infantry Brigade and Vancouver Barracks (1921–1922).

He retired on December 1, 1922, with his permanent rank of brigadier general. In 1930, Congress passed legislation allowing the temporary generals of World War I to retire at the highest rank they had held, and Blatchford was promoted to major general on the retired list.

Blatchford died in San Francisco on August 31, 1934. He had no children by either of his two marriages.

== Legacy ==
USS General R. M. Blatchford (AP-153), launched in 1944 and named in his honor, was a General G. O. Squier-class transport ship for the U.S. Navy in World War II.
