= Claire Blatchford =

American poet

- Born: 1944 (age 81–82); Washington D.C.
- Education: Bennington College
- Occupations: Author, Teacher
- Known for: Spiritual books, Deaf literature

Claire Blatchford (born 1944 in Washington D.C.) is an author. She became deaf at the age of six due to mumps. She graduated in 1966 from Bennington College. and earned a master's degree from Adelphi University in the Waldorf School teacher training program and in Deaf education from Teachers College, Columbia University. She is married and has two daughters. She continued working for several years as a teacher of deaf children. Claire Blatchford is an author of spiritual books and Deaf literature, including books and poetry.

== Selected works ==
=== Spiritual books and deaf literature ===
- All Alone (1984)
- Turning: Words Heard from Within (1994, 2001)
- Many Ways of Hearing: 94 Multitasked Lessons in Listening (1997)
- Friend of My Heart: Meeting Christ in Everyday Life (1999)
- Becoming: A Call to Love (2004)
- Experiences with the Dying and the Dead: Waking to Our Connections with Those Who Have Died (2007)

=== Deaf poetry ===
- The Deaf Girl: a memory
- The Collector
- Centering
- Acorn
- Mid-winter
