= Eliphalet Nott =

American academic (1773–1866)

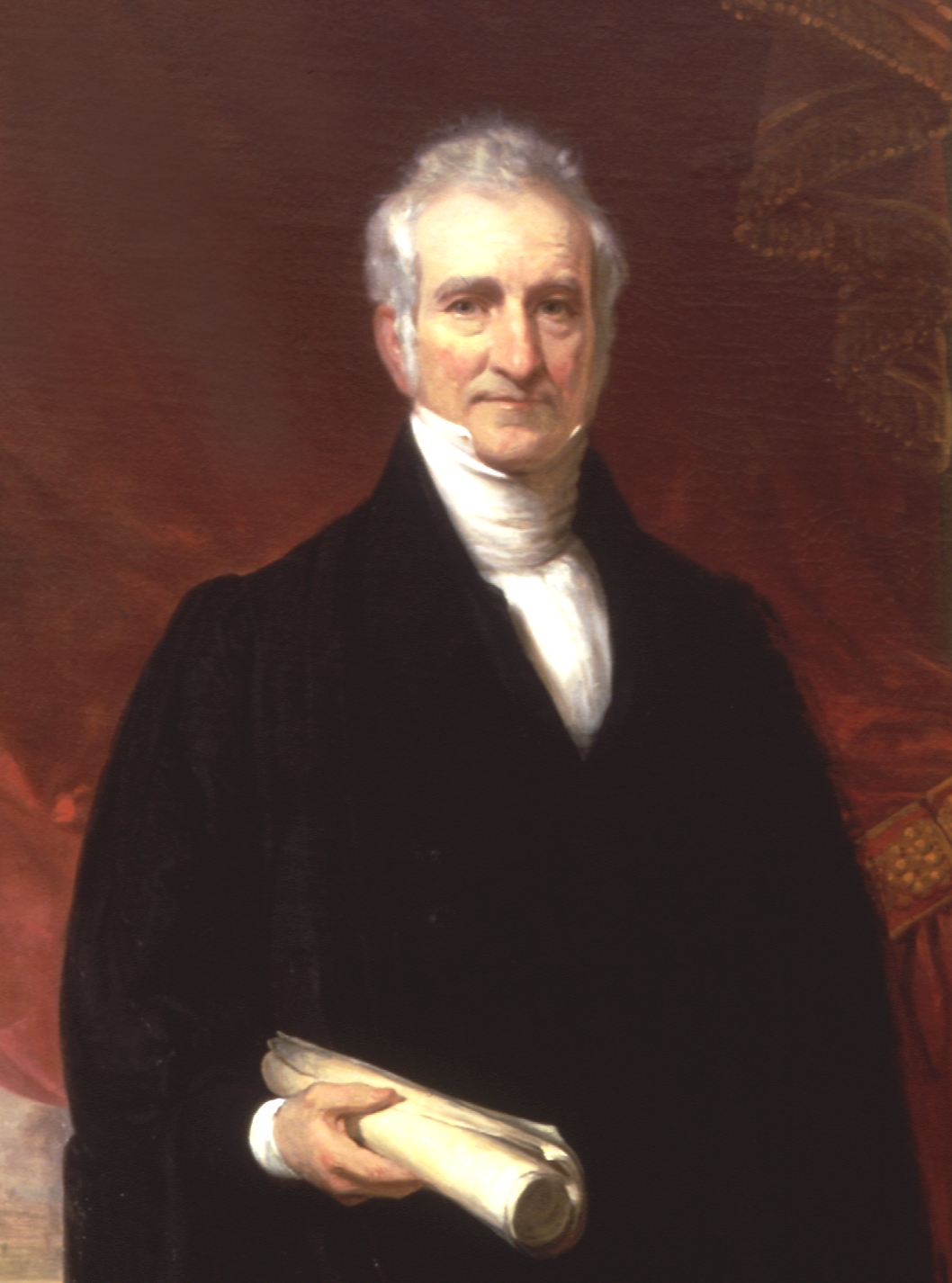
- Portrait of Eliphalet Nott, 1839

President of Union College
- In office 1804–1866
- Preceded by: Jonathan Maxcy
- Succeeded by: Laurens Perseus Hickok

President of Rensselaer Polytechnic Institute
- In office 1829–1845
- Preceded by: John Chester
- Succeeded by: Nathan S.S. Beman

Personal details
- Born: June 25, 1773 Ashford, Connecticut Colony
- Died: January 25, 1866 (aged 92) Schenectady, New York
- Spouses: Sarah Marie Benedict (m. 1796; died 1804) Gertrude Peebles (m. 1807; died 1841) Urania Sheldon (m. 1842)
- Education: Rhode Island College (now Brown University)
- Occupation: Presbyterian minister, inventor, educator
- Known for: Long-term president of Union College

Eliphalet Nott (June 25, 1773 – January 25, 1866) was an American Presbyterian minister, inventor, educational pioneer, and long-term president of Union College, Schenectady, New York.

== Early life ==
Nott was born at Ashford, Connecticut, on June 25, 1773. He was the second son, and youngest of nine children, born to Stephen Nott and Deborah (née Selden) Nott.

In 1795, he earned a degree from Rhode Island College (which later became known as Brown University).

== Career ==
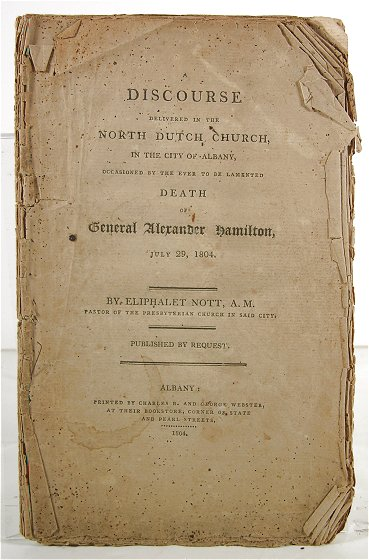
Cover of pamphlet created from 1804 Nott sermon, On the Death of Hamilton

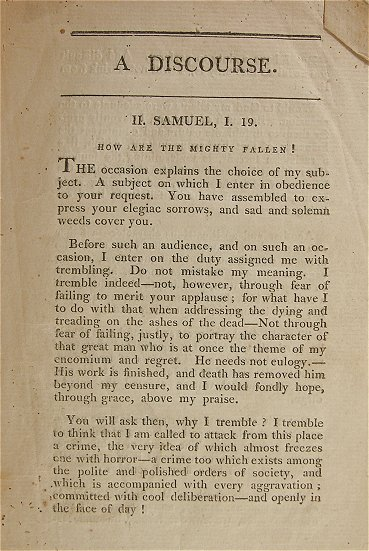
Opening text of sermon

Around 1802, he was called to the Presbyterian Church at Albany, where he took a prominent position as a preacher and was heard by large congregations. Among his successful pulpit efforts at Albany was a sermon on the death of Founding Father Alexander Hamilton, entitled On the Death of Hamilton, condemning the practice of dueling, that had profound influence in curtailing the custom and remains recognized to this day as an exemplary period example of the orator's art.

=== College presidency ===
In 1804, at the age of 31, Nott became president of Union College, a role he served in until his death in 1866, during which time more than 4,000 students are estimated to have graduated from Union. He also served as president of Rensselaer Polytechnic Institute from 1829 to 1845, where he "visited the school at least every third week and was compensated with one dollar per visit plus all graduation fees."

Upon assuming the presidency of Union, he reportedly found the College financially embarrassed and successfully worked to place it on sound footings. In the early 1830s, after the founding of the Union Triad fraternities, Nott called for the dissolution of all fraternities. He was dissuaded from this by a member of Delta Phi named John Jay Hyde.

In 1805, the College of New Jersey conferred upon him the title of D.D. (Doctor of Divinity), and in 1828, he received the title of LL.D. His publications include collections of sermons, Counsels to Young Men (1810), and Lectures on Temperance (1847). In 1814, Nott was elected a member of the American Antiquarian Society. A number of imprints authored by Nott, or related to him in some way, reside in the society's collections.

=== Inventor and real estate investor ===
As a scientist, he studied heat and obtained some thirty or more patents for applications of heat to steam engines, but was best known in his day as the inventor of the first stove for anthracite coal, which was named for him.

Nott was a land speculator and developer and, partnering with his nephew Henry Sheldon Anable, bought several farms on the Long Island shore of the East River that became the sites of industrial enterprises.

== Personal life ==
He married Sarah Marie "Sally" Benedict (1774–1804), the daughter of Rev. Joel Benedict of Plainfield, Connecticut, under whose instruction in early life he pursued his classical and mathematical studies. Before Sally's death at the age of 29 on March 10, 1804, they were the parents of:

- Joel Benedict Nott (1797-1878), who married Margaret Taylor Cooper. Parents of Charles C. Nott.
- Sarah Marie Nott (1799–1839), who married Bishop Alonzo Potter, brother of Bishop Horatio Potter.
- John Nott (1801–1878), who married Mary Ann Lawrence (1824–1911) in 1830.
- Benjamin Nott (1802–1881), who married Elizabeth Cooper (1808–1867).

In 1807, he married Gertrude Peebles Tibbits (1771–1841), who died in January 1841.

In 1842, a year and a half after the death of his second wife, Nott married Urania Elizabeth Sheldon (1806– April 19, 1886) a Troy Female Seminary graduate who was a well-known superintendent of several women's schools and the leader of several local benevolent associations.

Beginning in 1860, Nott suffered a series of strokes while serving as president. He died on January 25, 1866, in Schenectady, New York, and was buried at the Vale Cemetery in Schenectady.

=== Legacy ===
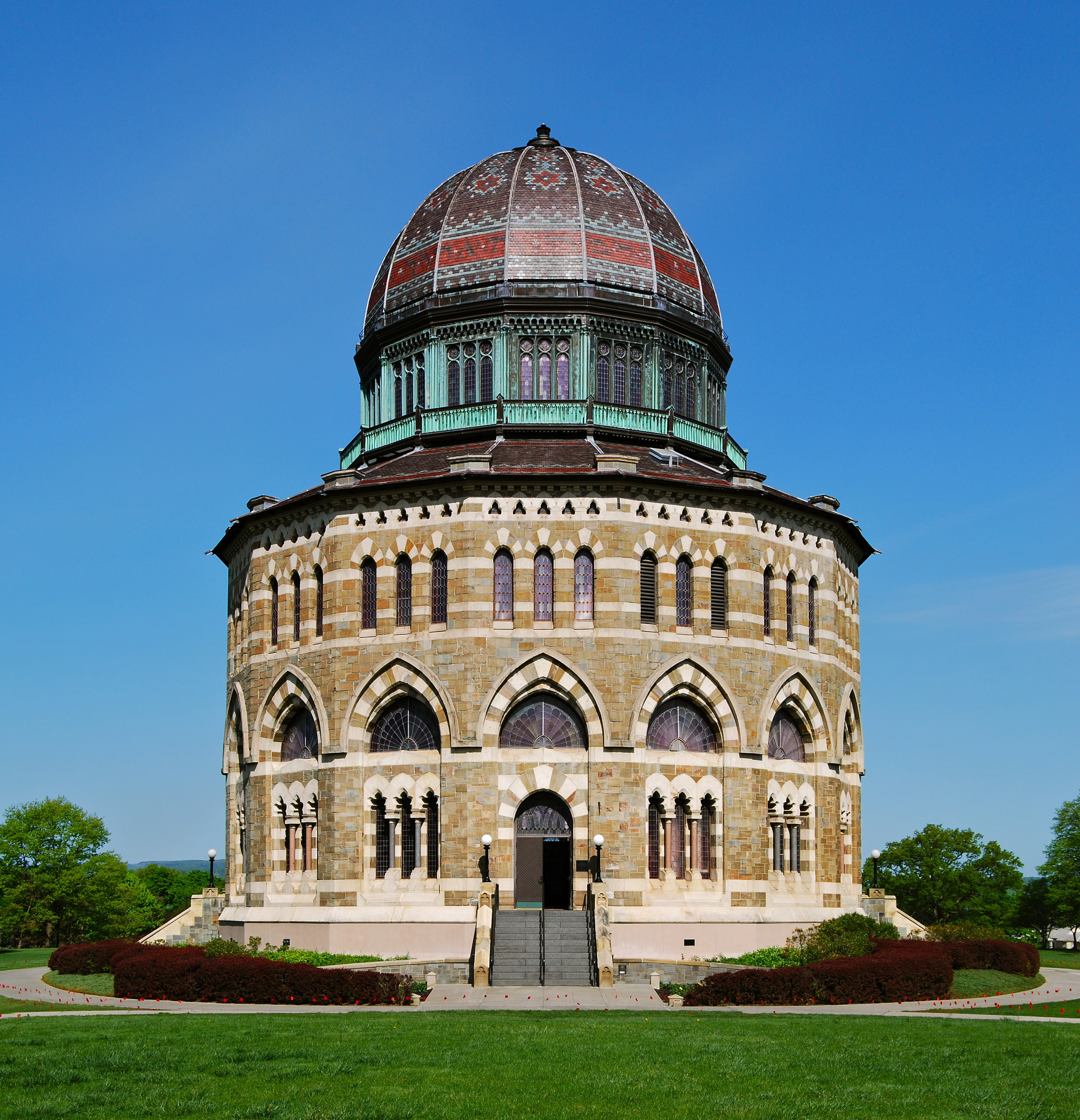
The Nott Memorial

The Nott Memorial, a centerpiece of the Union College's campus, was built by his grandson, and Union graduate, Edward Tuckerman Potter and named in Nott's honor.

Nott Road in Rexford, New York, the location of his farm, is named for him, as are Nott Street and Nott Terrace, which border Union College in Schenectady, New York. He remains the longest serving college president in the United States to this day.

Academic offices
Preceded by Jonathan Maxcy	President of Union College; 1804–1866	Succeeded by Laurens Perseus Hickok
Preceded by John Chester	President of Rensselaer Polytechnic Institute; 1829–1845	Succeeded by Nathan S.S. Beman
