= Laurens Perseus Hickok =

American philosopher (1798–1888)

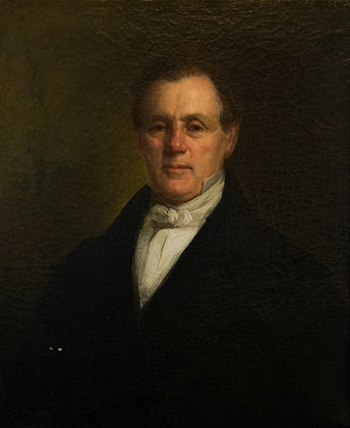
- Born: 20 December 1798; Danbury
- Died: 7 May 1888
- Education: Union College
- Occupations: Philosopher, university teacher, pastor (1822–1836)

Laurens Perseus Hickok (December 20, 1798 – May 7, 1888), American philosopher and divine, was born in Connecticut.

== Biography ==
He took his degree at Union College in 1820. Until 1836 he was occupied in active pastoral work, and was then appointed professor of theology at the Western Reserve College, Ohio, and later (1844–1852) at the Auburn Theological Seminary in Auburn, New York.

From this post he was elected vice-president of Union College and professor of mental and moral science. In 1866, he succeeded Dr. E. Nott as president, but in July 1868 retired to Amherst, Massachusetts, where he devoted himself to writing and study. A collected edition of his principal works was published at Boston in 1875. The Archives and Special Collections at Amherst College holds a collection of his papers.

== Works ==
- Rational Psychology (1849)
- System of Moral Science (1853)
- Empirical Psychology (1854)
- Rational Cosmology (1858)
- Creator and Creation, or the Knowledge in the Reason of God and His Work (1872)
- Humanity Immortal (1872)
- Logic of Reason (1874)

== See also ==
- American philosophy
- List of American philosophers
