= Samuel Nathan Blatchford =

United States Army Air Corps soldier (1925–2005)

- Born: June 23, 1924; Fort Defiance, Arizona
- Died: December 25, 2005 (aged 79–80)
- Burial place: Arlington National Cemetery
- Military career
- Branch: US Army Air Corps
- Rank: Master Sergeant
- Conflicts: World War II; Korean War; Vietnam War
- Awards: Silver Star; Legion of Merit; Distinguished Flying Cross; Purple Heart (4); Air Medal (6); Prisoner of War Medal

Samuel Nathan Blatchford (1925–2005) was an American soldier and civil engineer. He is the most decorated Native American soldier to date.

Blatchford's mother, Pauline Manuelito was the great-granddaughter of the great war chief Manuelito, who fought Kit Carson in the Navajo Wars (1869–63) and led his people in exile to the current Navajo Reservation.

In 1941, Blatchford began his own journey as a warrior, enlisting into the US Army Air Corps before World War II. At the age of 17, standing 5'9" and weighing 130 pounds, it seemed unlikely that Samuel would make much of a name for himself as a warrior. His military service included:

- Serving as a radio operator and gunner on a B17 Flying Fortress in Europe and getting shot down four times.
- Working with the French Resistance until his capture by the Gestapo.
- Numerous escape attempts from Stalag 17-B.
- Combat flying missions in Korea.
- Combat service as a ground forward air controller with an Army unit in Vietnam.

During World War II, Blatchford's plane was shot down and exploded midair over enemy lines. Thrown from the plane, he was able to pull the ripcord on his parachute before losing consciousness. Thereon in, he fought with the French before being captured and spending 18 months as a Prisoner of War in Stalag 17. Upon his rescue and return to the United States, he discovered that his fiancée, who presumed he was dead, had married someone else and was expecting a child. 56 years later, when both had become widows, they finally married.

Over his military career, Blatchford earned a total of 28 medals including; the Silver Star, Legion of Merit, Distinguished Flying Cross with one oak leaf cluster, four Purple Hearts, six Air Medals and the Prisoner of War Medal. The French government presented him with its Freedom Medal for his work with the French Resistance, a Citizenship Medal bestowing honorary citizenship, as well as the key to the city of Lizio, Morbihan (56).

In recognition of his life, the Lakota Sioux adopted Blatchford and gave him the Yellow Eagle Feather – the highest honor a Lakota warrior can receive.

Blatchford was also a Headman for the Memphis TiaPiah Society, holding the title of Grandfather Rabbit. The Memphis TiaPiah is a branch of the TiaPiah Society of Carnegie, now known as the Kiowa TiaPiah Society

In between wars, Blatchford earned a bachelor's degree in civil engineering and a master's degree in business administration. In addition to his native Navajo and second language of English, he also learned to speak Turkish, French, German and Japanese.

Blatchford died at the age of 81 on December 23, 2005. He is buried at Arlington National Cemetery.

In 2008, the US opened a $106 million military complex at Al Udeid Air Base and named it the Blatchford-Preston Complex, so that Sergeant Samuel Blatchford and General Maurice A. Preston would not be forgotten.
