= Neil Blatchford =

American speed skater

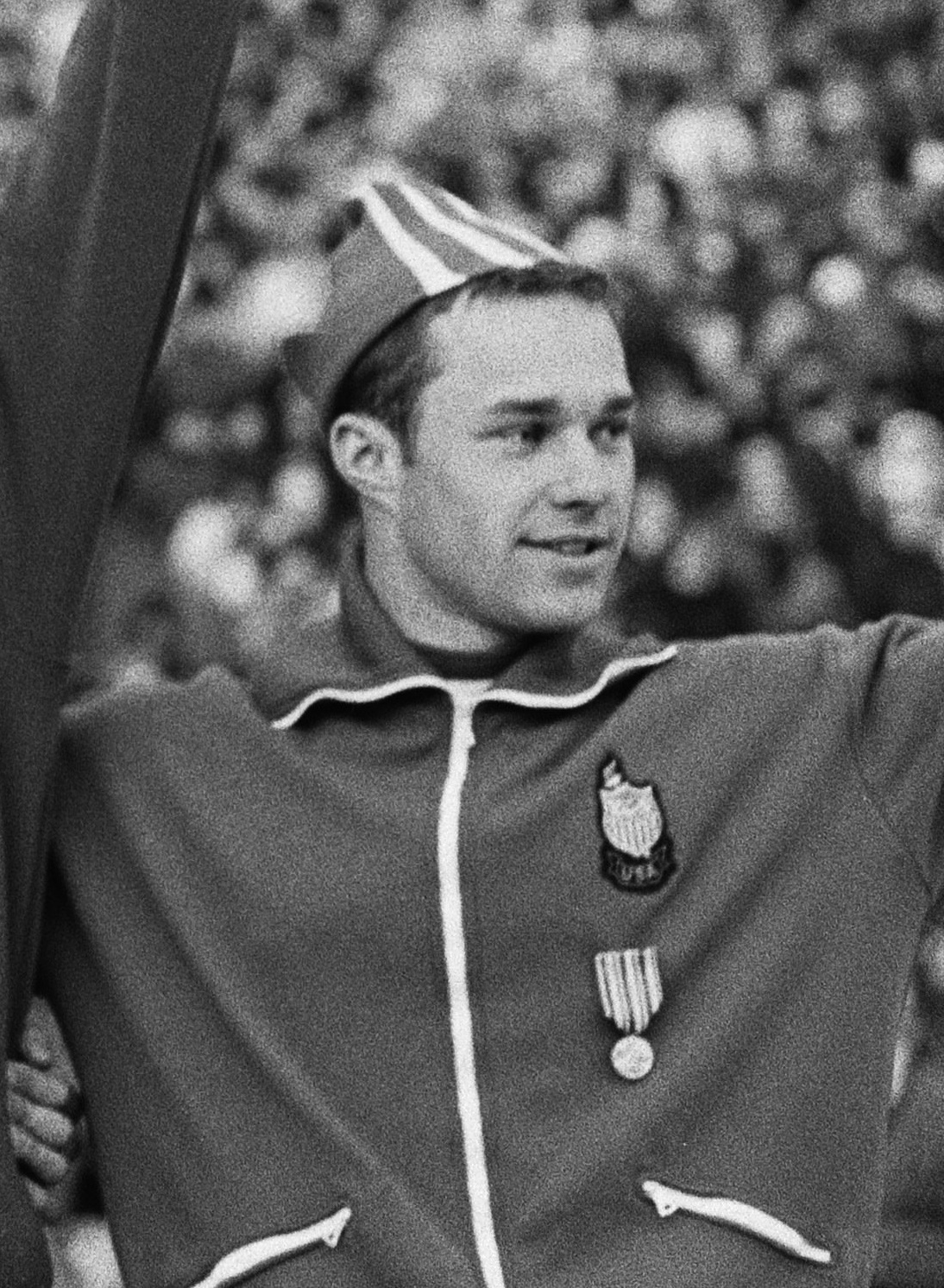
- Neil Blatchford in 1968

Personal information
- Born: October 5, 1945 (age 80) Chicago, United States
- Height: 1.83 m (6 ft 0 in)
- Weight: 80 kg (180 lb)

Sport
- Sport: Speed skating
- Club: Northbrook Speedskating Club
Medal record
Men's speed skating
Representing the United States
World Championships
Silver medal – second place	1969 Deventer	500 m
Silver medal – second place	1968 Gothenburg	500 m

Nathaniel H. "Neil" Blatchford, IV (born October 5, 1945) is a retired American speed skater who specialized in the 500 m sprint. In this event he finished in 5th and 15th place at the 1968 and 1972 Winter Olympics, respectively. He finished second in this distance at the 1968 and 1969 world championships. He was the US Intermediate Champion in 1963 and won the All-around title in 1964.

Personal bests:

- 500 m – 38.46 (1972)
- 1000 m – 1:21.7 (1972)
- 1500 m – 2:12.9 (1972)
- 5000 m – 8:36.9 (1969)
