= Eliphalet Wickes Blatchford =

American manufacturer (1826-1914)

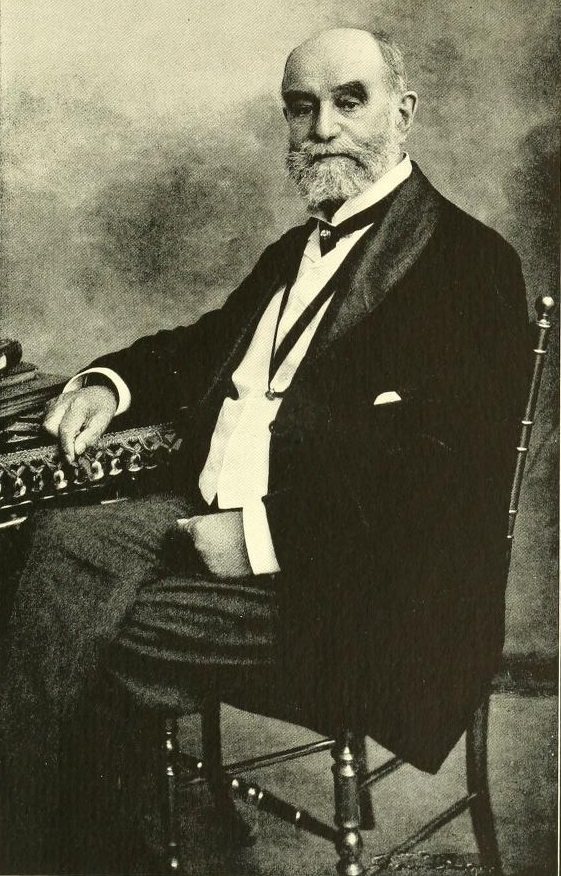
From 1912's Blatchford Memorial II by E. W. Blatchford

Eliphalet Wickes Blatchford (May 31, 1826 – January 25, 1914) was an American manufacturer.

== Biography ==
Coat of arms of Eliphalet Wickes Blatchford

Blatchford's grave at Graceland Cemetery

In 1837, the Blatchfords moved from Stillwater, New York to Chicago, Illinois, where Eliphalet's father, the Rev. John Blatchford, became pastor of the First Presbyterian Church.

The family eventually settled in Marion City, Missouri, where Blatchford's father became president of Marion College. Blatchford attended Illinois College and became a lead manufacturer in St. Louis. His success in this industry allowed him to relocate to Chicago, where his company, E.W. Blatchford and Co., specialized in lead plumbing, animal feed, and wire for munitions.

In addition to being a successful manufacturer, Blatchford was well known for his religious activities. He served for forty years as the president of the Chicago Theological Seminary, and also contributed his time and money to several mission organizations such as the American Board of Commissioners for Foreign Missions and the Chicago Missionary Society.

As longtime chairman of the Newberry Library's board of trustees, Blatchford oversaw the hiring of the Newberry's first librarians and did much to shape the institution, including developing its commitment to genealogy. The Newberry Library originated as half of the $4 million estate of the railroad and real-estate magnate Walter Loomis Newberry (1804–1868). His nephew Walter C. Newberry (himself a library trustee) and other surviving relatives showed keen interest in colonial New England and English lineage.

Blatchford's contributions continue to be present across the state of Illinois through his extensive work as a trustee of Illinois College, Rockford Seminary, and the Art Institute of Chicago. As the executor of Walter Newberry's estate, Blatchford also established the Newberry and was instrumental in early construction and staff decisions . Blatchford married Mary Emily Williams in 1858, and they built and settled in the first of two houses named Ulmenheim, which roughly translates to "elm home" in German. This house was destroyed in the Chicago fire, but was later rebuilt. The Blatchfords remained an active couple in Chicago, devoting their time to social and philanthropic activities until E. W.'s death at their home in Chicago on January 25, 1914. He was buried at Graceland Cemetery.

Following her husband's death, Mary moved to Upper Montclair, New Jersey with her daughter, Fanny Blatchford. The Blatchfords had seven children – Paul (1859–1925), Amy (1862–1941), Frances May (Fanny) (1865–1919), Edward Williams (Ned) (1868–1956), Florence (1872–1874), Charles Hammond (1874–1953), and E. Huntington (1876–1905).
