= Samuel Blatchford =

US Supreme Court justice from 1882 to 1893

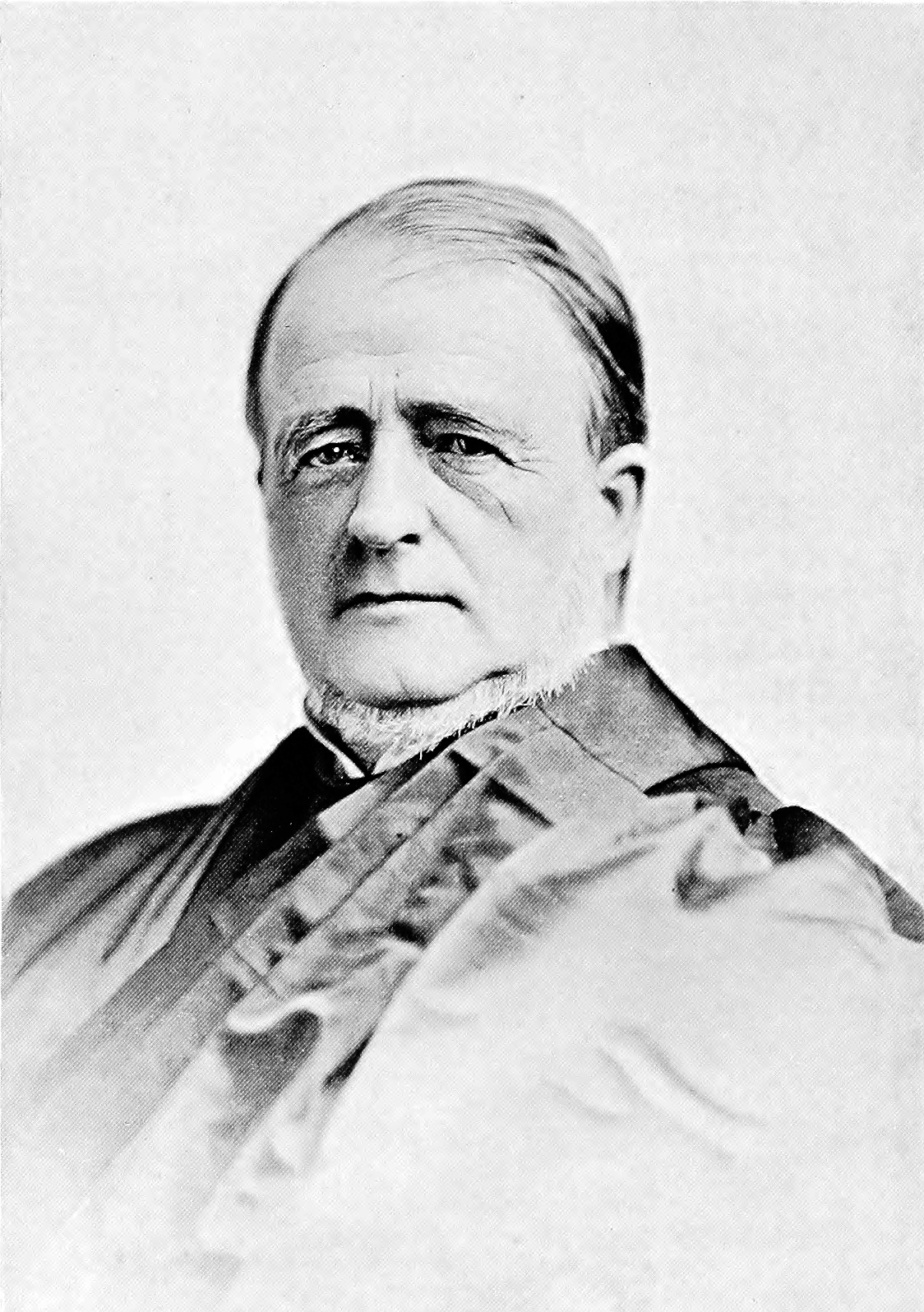
- Blatchford c. 1893

Associate Justice of the Supreme Court of the United States
- In office April 3, 1882 – July 7, 1893
- Nominated by: Chester Arthur
- Preceded by: Ward Hunt
- Succeeded by: Edward White

Judge of the United States Circuit Court for the Second Circuit
- In office March 4, 1878 – March 22, 1882
- Nominated by: Rutherford Hayes
- Preceded by: Alexander Johnson
- Succeeded by: William Wallace

Judge of the United States District Court for the Southern District of New York
- In office May 3, 1867 – March 4, 1878
- Nominated by: Andrew Johnson
- Preceded by: Samuel Betts
- Succeeded by: William Choate

Personal details
- Born: March 9, 1820 Auburn, New York, U.S.
- Died: July 7, 1893 (aged 73) Newport, Rhode Island, U.S.
- Party: Republican
- Spouse: Caroline Appleton (m. 1844)
- Education: Columbia College (BA)

Samuel M. Blatchford (March 9, 1820 – July 7, 1893) was an American attorney and judge who served as an Associate Justice of the Supreme Court of the United States from April 3, 1882, until his death in 1893.

== Early life and career ==
Coat of Arms of Samuel Blatchford

Blatchford was born in Auburn, New York, on March 9, 1820. He was the eldest of five children born to Julia Ann Blatchford (née Mumford) and Richard Milford Blatchford. U.S. Army Major General Richard M. Blatchford was his cousin.

Blatchford read law under Seward and then entered into the private practice of law with his father and uncle. In 1854, he moved to New York City and started a law firm, Blatchford, Seward & Griswold, now known as Cravath, Swaine & Moore. He became well known for preparing summaries of United States circuit court cases, serving for a time as reporter of decisions for the Circuit Court in New York, and developed a lucrative practice in admiralty law.

On May 3, 1867, Blatchford received a recess appointment from President Andrew Johnson to a seat on the United States District Court for the Southern District of New York vacated by Samuel Betts. Blatchford was formally nominated on July 13, 1867, and confirmed by the United States Senate and received his commission three days later.

On February 15, 1878, President Rutherford B. Hayes promoted Blatchford to serve on the United States Court of Appeals for the Second Circuit to fill the vacancy caused by the death of Alexander S. Johnson. Blatchford was confirmed by the Senate and received his commission on March 4, 1878.

== Supreme Court of the United States ==
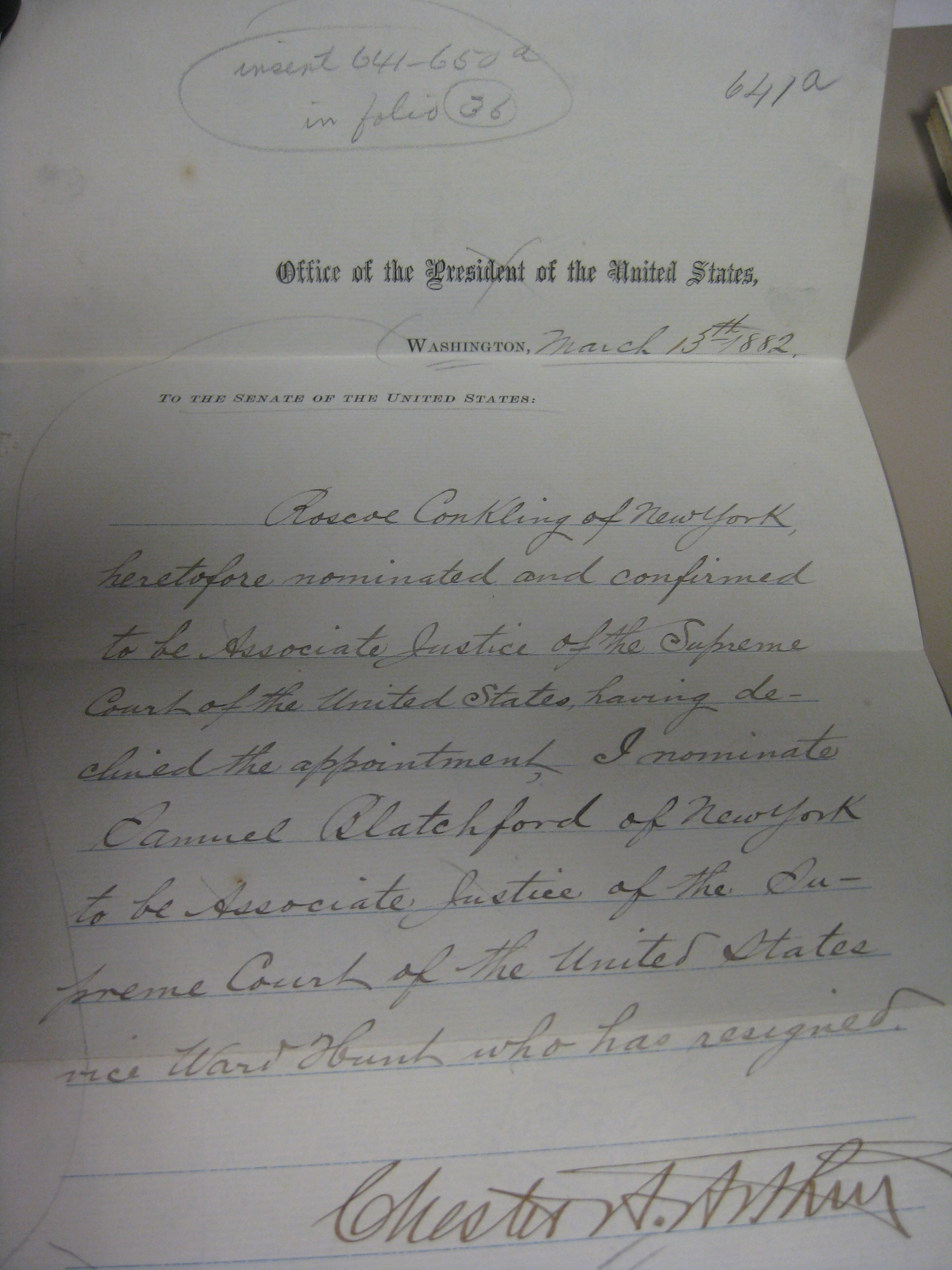
Blatchford's Supreme Court nomination

On March 13, 1882, Blatchford was nominated as an associate justice of the Supreme Court of the United States by President Chester A. Arthur to a seat vacated by Ward Hunt, after Senator George F. Edmunds and former Senator Roscoe Conkling had declined nomination. He was confirmed by the United States Senate on March 22, 1882, and was sworn into office on April 3, 1882. Blatchford thus became the first person to serve at all three levels of the federal judiciary—as a district judge, a circuit judge, and a Supreme Court justice. When he was nominated for the Supreme Court, it was estimated that his personal wealth exceeded $3 million (equivalent to $100,000,000 in 2025), mostly held in real estate.

Blatchford was an expert in admiralty law and patent law, and authored Blatchford and Howland's Admiralty Cases, which was considered the most complete work of its kind. During his eleven-year tenure on the High Court, he wrote 430 opinions and two dissents. His most noteworthy opinions, Chicago, Milwaukee & St. Paul Railway Co. v. Minnesota, and Budd v. People of New York, were roundly criticized for their apparently contradictory conclusions about due process under the Fourteenth Amendment of the U.S. Constitution.

== Personal life ==
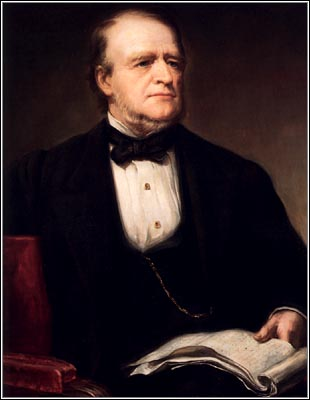
Portrait of Samuel Blatchford

Blatchford's father was a well known attorney and friend of Daniel Webster who served as a New York State Assemblyman in 1855, U.S. Minister to the Papal States, and New York City Park Commissioner in 1872. After his mother's death in 1857, his father remarried to Angelica Hamilton, daughter of James Alexander Hamilton and granddaughter of Alexander Hamilton, the first Treasury Secretary. Angelica died in 1868, and Blatchford married for the third time, to Katherine Hone.

Blatchford's grandfather, also named Samuel Blatchford, was born in England and was the first president of Rensselaer Polytechnic Institute. The younger Samuel Blatchford was educated at Columbia College, where he joined the Philolexian Society and graduated when he was 17 years old. In 1840, he served as private secretary to New York Governor William H. Seward. From 1842 to 1845, he served as the Military Secretary of New York. In 1844, Blatchford was married to Caroline Frances Appleton (1817–1901) in Boston. Caroline was the daughter of Eben Appleton and Sarah (née Patterson) Appleton. Together, they had one son: Samuel Appleton Blatchford (1845–1905), also a lawyer, who married Wilhelmina Bogart Conger (1848–1944), daughter of Hon. Abraham B. Conger, the namesake of Congers, New York.

On what he thought was inside information, Blatchford sold all his shares of stock on the eve of the Battle of Fort Sumter and the decline in stock prices that took place at the onset of the American Civil War, thus preserving his personal fortune.

Blatchford served as a trustee of Columbia College.

In June 1893, Blatchford was stricken with paralysis at his home in Newport, Rhode Island on Greenough Place. He died at his home in Newport at age 73 on July 7, 1893. After a funeral service at the All Saints' Chapel in Newport conducted by Bishop Henry C. Potter (his brother-in-law Edward Tuckerman Potter's brother), his body was transported by train to New York City, where he was buried at Greenwood Cemetery in Brooklyn.

In Blatchford's will, which was drawn on June 15, 1876, he left $100,000 to Rachel Bliss Beckwith and $20,000 to Cordelia F. Green. To his widow, he left the furniture and artwork in his Newport home and the income from half of his estate. His son received the other half of the income and split the realty with his mother. Upon his wife's death, one-third of her share of the realty went to Rachel Beckwith, a third to Julia Maria Potter, and the remaining third to his unmarried sister, Sophia Ethelinda Blatchford.

== Legacy ==
The World War II Liberty Ship SS Samuel Blatchford was named in his honor.

== See also ==
- List of justices of the Supreme Court of the United States

Legal offices
Preceded by Samuel Betts	Judge of the United States District Court for the Southern District of New York; 1867–1878	Succeeded by William Choate
Preceded by Alexander Johnson	Judge of the United States Circuit Court for the Second Circuit; 1878–1882	Succeeded by William Wallace
Preceded by Ward Hunt	Associate Justice of the Supreme Court of the United States; 1882–1893	Succeeded by Edward White
