= Fiber festival =

Art festival involving fibers

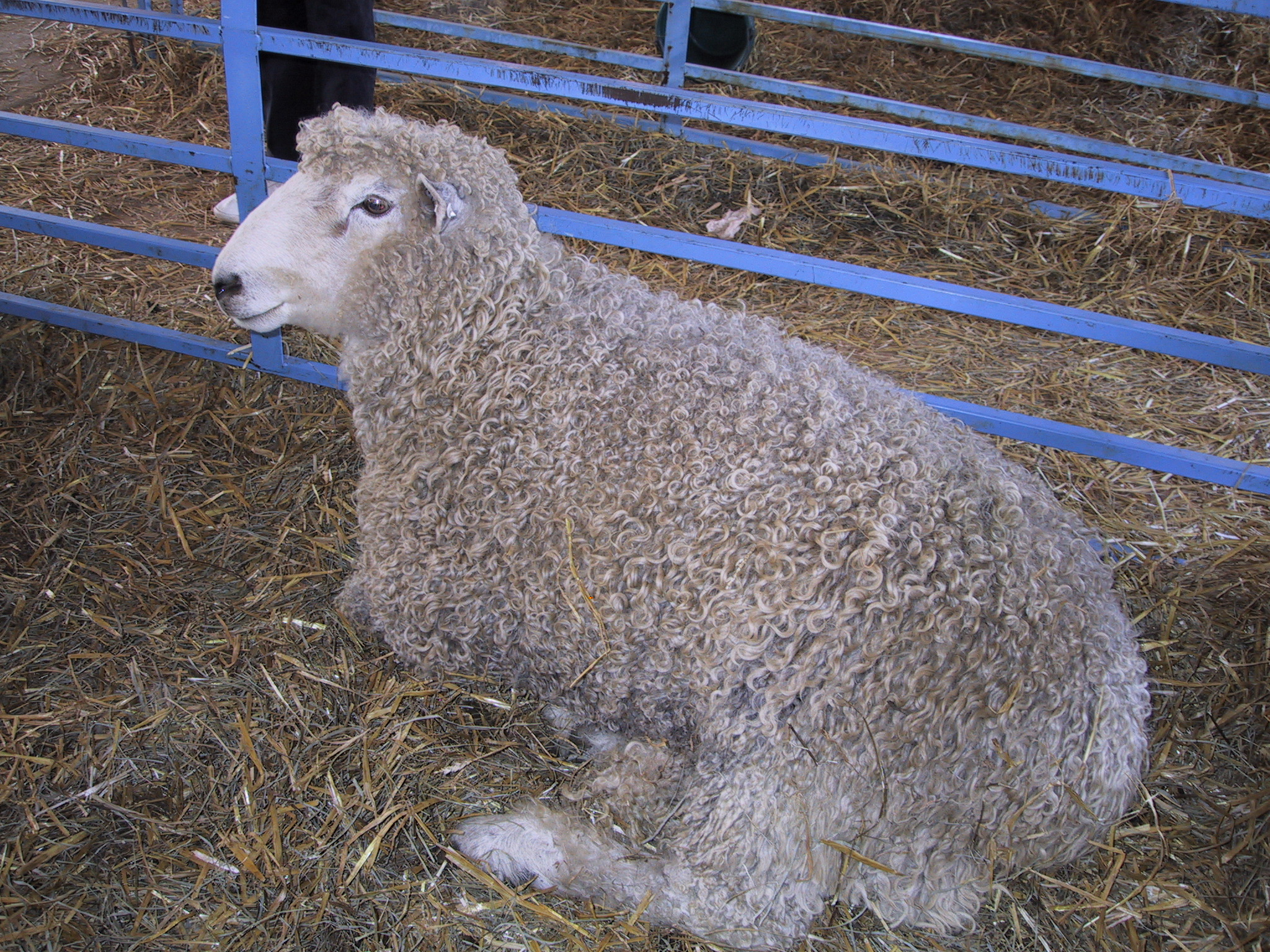
Ewe on display at the Maryland Sheep and Wool Festival

Fiber festivals bring together producers and vendors of mostly animal fibers, such as wool, qiviut, camelid, mohair, and angora. Other fibers include silk, linen, and some synthetic fibers. The festival caters to knitters, spinners, felters, crocheters, and dyers in the United States. Attendees learn and see different materials, techniques, and patterns. Fiber festivals also provide a meeting place for people who otherwise know one another only from Internet lists and blogs.

Events that Take Place at Fiber Festivals:

Vendor booths: One of the main attractions of fiber festivals is the marketplace, where vendors sell a range of fiber materials and supplies, including yarns, roving, fabrics, and tools. These booths offer a chance to see and touch the materials and get advice from the vendors about what would work best for your projects.

Demonstrations and workshops: Fiber festivals often feature workshops and demonstrations led by experts in the field. Participants can learn new techniques, get tips and tricks, and ask questions from experienced instructors.

Competitions and exhibitions: Many fiber festivals host competitions for various fiber arts, such as knitting, weaving, and spinning, and showcase the winners in exhibitions.

Social events: Fiber festivals also provide opportunities for socializing with fellow enthusiasts, such as knit and crochet circles, meet-and-greets with instructors, and other social events.

== Regional festivals ==
- Maryland Sheep and Wool Festival, in West Friendship, Maryland, the first full weekend in May. It is largest and longest-running showcase of domestic sheep and wool in the United States. The festival was started in 1973.
- NH Wool Arts Tour 4 stops in the Monadnock Region of NH. Columbus Day weekend.
- New York State Sheep and Wool Festival in Rhinebeck, New York, in October. The festival was first held in 1972.
- Finger Lakes Fiber Festival in Hemlock, New York, the third weekend in September
- Spin Spa in Portland, Maine, in mid-February
- Connecticut Sheep and Wool Festival in Connecticut, the last weekend in April
- New Hampshire Sheep and Wool Festival in Hopkinton, New Hampshire, on Mother's Day weekend
- Massachusetts Sheep and Wool Festival in Cummington, at the end of May
- Fiber Arts and Animals Festival in Marshall, Michigan on the second or third Saturday in June.
- Vermont Sheep and Wool Festival in Essex Junction, Vermont, in September
- Southern Indiana FiberArts Festival in Corydon, Indiana, the third Saturday in October
- Shepherd's Harvest Festival in Minnesota, each Mother's Day weekend in May.
- Fiber Arts Festival in North Dakota, the fourth weekend in July.
- Kentucky Sheep and Fiber Festival in Lexington, Kentucky, the middle of May.
- Indiana Fiber and Music Festival in Clarksville, Indiana, the weekend before the Kentucky Derby.
- Shenandoah Valley Fiber Festival in Berryville, Virginia, the end of September.
- Finger Lakes Fiber Festival in Hemlock, New York, the middle of September.
- Yarncentrick in Frederick, Maryland, the first Friday in May

Among these regional fiber festivals, the Maryland Sheep and Wool Festival and the New York Sheep and Wool Festival are the largest.

- Sneffels Fiber Festival in Ridgway, Colorado September 13 and 14, 2013 sponsored by the Weehawken Creative Arts Center in Ridgway.
- Upper Midwest Fall Fiber Festival in Hopkins, Minnesota November 2, 2013 (always the 1st Saturday in November.) www.fallfiberfestival.com
