= Sheep and Wool Festival =

Sheep and Wool Festival may refer to:

- Maryland Sheep and Wool Festival
- New York State Sheep and Wool Festival
