= Shepherd's Harvest Festival =

Sheep and wool festival in Minnesota, U.S.

Coordinates: 45°0′37″N 92°51′27″W

Minnesota's Shepherd's Harvest Festival is the largest sheep and wool festival in Minnesota.

== History ==
The festival began in 1997 and is run entirely by volunteers with support from the Minnesota Lamb and Wool Producers Association. Llama Magic is held on the fairgrounds the same weekend as Shepherd's Harvest.

It is held annually, normally each Mother's Day weekend at the Washington County Fairgrounds in Lake Elmo, Minnesota. The official website listed the 2022 festival (the 24th) as the following weekend, 07–08 May.

It has vendors selling a full spectrum of sheep and wool related items including fiber, yarns, spinning wheels, knitting supplies, sheep cheese, lanolin, lamb burgers, vet supplies and breeding stock. It offers the only fleece competition in the state as well as hosting felting, skein and photo competitions. Its educational component includes fiber related and sheep raising classes. Demonstrations include sheep shearing, dog herding, linen-making and a natural fibers fashion show. Local authors, sheep experts, knitting designers and chefs are invited to share their sheep and wool expertise with the community.

== See also ==
- Fiber Festival
- Maryland Sheep and Wool Festival
