= Paraclete Potter =

Publisher, bookseller and politician (1784 - 1858)

Paraclete Potter (1784 – 1858) was a publisher, bookseller, political activist, and civic-minded entrepreneur in Poughkeepsie, Dutchess County, New York. For several years, he was the publisher of the Poughkeepsie Journal newspaper and owned a popular bookstore. He became wealthy in a real estate boom in the 1830s, and went bust by 1840, in a real estate crash; then, he rebuilt his multi-part career in Wisconsin Territory.

== Personal life ==
Paraclete and his eight siblings came from a line of Potters that settled in Rhode Island, New England, USA in colonial times. Paraclete's father, Joseph, moved with his wife Anna and their children to the town of Beekman in Dutchess County, where he became a successful farmer. Joseph was active in community causes, including the Dutchess Agricultural Society, and was twice elected to the New York State Assembly—in 1797 and in 1813. Two of Paraclete's younger brothers, Alonzo Potter (1800 – 1865) and Horatio Potter (1802–1887) eventually became Bishops in the Protestant Episcopal Church.

== Multi-part career ==
=== Newspapers and politics ===
The Poughkeepsie Journal was originally established in 1785, and changed hands numerous times. Paraclete Potter became a co-publisher of the paper in 1806, as junior partner in Bowman & Potter. He owned the paper, fully, from 1809 until he sold it 1834.

Newspapers in those times tended to each support specific political parties. The Journal, in its first years under Potter, supported the Federalist Party, who favored a strong central government, in opposition to the Democratic-Republican Party of Presidents Jefferson and Madison. Other Poughkeepsie papers, which came and went, supported alternative viewpoints. Potter and his Journal strongly opposed the War of 1812, believing the country was unprepared to fight Britain, and that the war would be a disaster, economically.

Besides expressing his political views in the Journal, Potter also participated directly, for many years, in Poughkeepsie's Federal Republican Electors Committee. They drafted resolutions and supported party nominations, such as for state governor. At various times, Potter served as the committee's secretary, and in other roles.

Potter also sometimes lobbied the state in other forums, for improved transportation access to Poughkeepsie, whether by a new turnpike route or for a new canal or railroad route.

When Andrew Jackson ran for president, in 1828, there was a bandwagon of support, across old party lines, in favor of Jackson. Jackson advocated for states’ rights and a “common man” populism; but also supported a strong federal executive. The Journal joined that bandwagon, and it was a Democratic paper by the time Potter left as publisher in 1834. Potter was a delegate at the Dutchess County Democratic Republican Convention in 1835.

Potter later soured on Jackson and his successor, Martin Van Buren, because of their monetary policies, which some believed contributed to the financial Panic of 1837. That national disruption included loan losses and bank failures, as well as real-estate and stock-market price crashes. Potter expressed his objections forcefully in articles published in the Poughkeepsie Journal, in 1837 and 1838, co-signed by numerous others.

Somewhat earlier, in 1832, Potter advocated for having a Dutchess County, New York, auxiliary for the American Colonization Society. That movement encouraged free Blacks to settle in Africa, in what became Liberia. That cause was strongly opposed by Black spokesmen like Frederick Douglass, and abolitionists like William Lloyd Garrison. Yet, at least, the movement recognized slavery as an evil. In prior years, Potter's paper had accepted advertisements for the “sale” of a person (without mentioning “slavery”). He'd also accepted ads for selling of “the time” (i.e. remaining “contract” time) of indentured servants.

=== Paraclete Potter's Bookstore ===
Within months of starting in newspaper publishing in 1806, Paraclete Potter and his partner Godfrey Bowman teamed up with Chester Parsons, who had recently opened a Bookbinding and Bookselling business in Poughkeepsie, to become the partnership Bowman, Parsons, and Potter.

Combining bookselling, printing, and bookbinding was, at the time, a common way for small publishers to save on printing costs for books, and limit expensive shipping. If books (like many British books) were not under U.S. copyright, a store could simply reprint and bind copies, itself, for its own market. For books under copyright, publishers often arranged to reprint, bind, and sell each others’ books—each for its own market; or else, books might be shipped as sheets, to be bound at the receiving bookstores.

Paraclete Potter's printing press produced mostly reprints. But some books it published were originals, including school books, legal-statute guidebooks, and a military-tactics guide.

Besides paper- and book-related services and products, like pamphlets, blank journals, and ink, Paraclete's bookstore also expanded its product lines. It often carried, for instance, various patent medicines; and garden seeds; "strops" for sharpening knives or razors; and fundraising lottery tickets.

The store itself, according to one of Potter's apprentices, became “a great village institution, a sort of club where all those who were fond of literature and of discussion were wont to gather.” Besides books for sale, the store also contained a subscription lending library. The store's front counter was, also, a point of contact for the community, where one could, for instance, respond to a published ad to buy a horse, or return a lost object for an award.

Potter announced periodically that he'd accept such items from customers as grains, pork, wood, butter, and cheese, “at fair market prices” in payment of their debts to him. So, presumably, there was suitable storage somewhere in the back of the store.

=== Civic-minded investing ===
Starting around age 30, Potter was appointed for some corporate-governance roles in the community. In 1814, he was a trustee for the Lancaster School Society. Later, he was a trustee for the Poughkeepsie Collegiate School, founded in 1836. He was also on the board of directors for the Middle District Bank.

Potter was very active from around 1830 in the “Poughkeepsie Improvement Party,” A notable, fellow member was Nathaniel P. Tallmadge, who became a United States senator in 1833. Besides aiming to make their town more attractive, members invested in, and served as directors in, daring ventures, such as a locomotive factory, the Poughkeepsie Whaling Company, and the Dutchess Whaling Company.

These activities contributed to a regional real estate boom—which collapsed following the Panic of 1837. Paraclete Potter was among those who lost his money.

Move to Wisconsin Territory

Potter and several others in the Improvement Party found new opportunities in the Wisconsin Territory. He received a patronage appointment as Land Register for Wisconsin in 1841, and renewed his interests in railroad development, local-school governance, and following politics.

In his later years, he became a corresponding member of the Wisconsin State Historical Society.
