= Dutchess County Fairgrounds =

Fairground in New York, U.S.

- Interactive map of Dutchess County Fairgrounds
- Location: Rhinebeck, New York
- Coordinates: 41.939°N 73.907°W
- Area: 162 acres (66 hectares)
- Operated by: Dutchess County Agricultural Society
- Status: Open
- Website: dutchessfair.com/the-fairgrounds/

The Dutchess County Fairgrounds is the home of the annual Dutchess County Fair. Open for over 160 years, the fairgrounds are open year-round and host a number of events. It is located on U.S. Route 9, about 3 miles from Amtrak's Rhinecliff-Kingston station.

== Events ==
=== Dutchess County Fair ===
The annual fair brings rides, food, live music and myriad attractions to the region for six days. The Grandstand Concert series features live music, and other attractions include police dog demonstrations with the Dutchess County Sheriff's Office, and an action sports exhibition with dirt bike and all-terrain vehicle stunts. In addition to these events, the fairgrounds are home to "Turn of the Century Village" with a one-room school, a working sugar house, and a cider mill.

=== Crafts at Rhinebeck ===
This hybrid vintage market and historical exhibit spreads across three large buildings at the Dutchess County Fairgrounds.

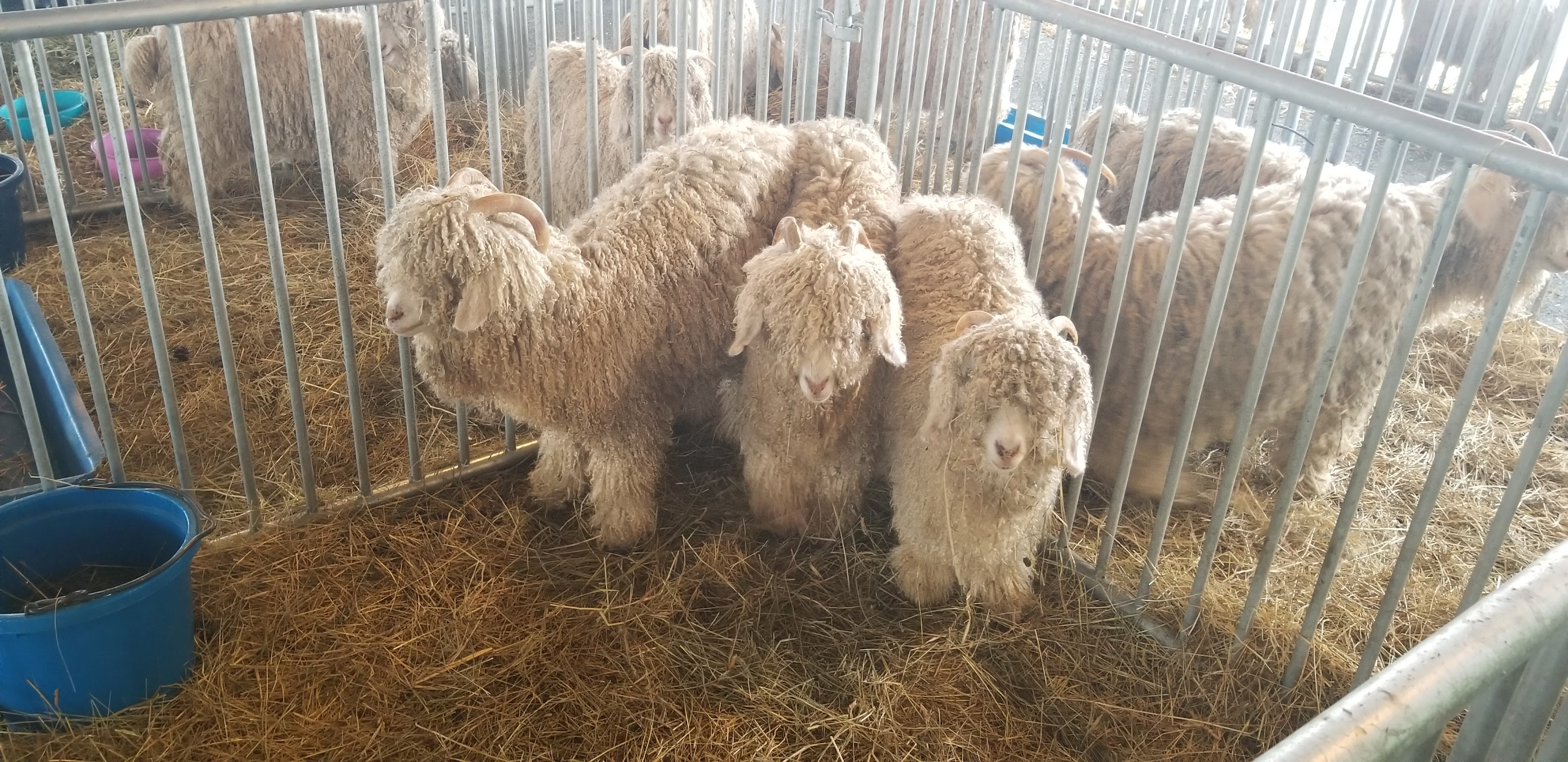
Dan Melamed’s prize-winning Angora goats at the New York State Sheep and Wool Festival.

=== Sheep and Wool Festival ===
The New York State Sheep and Wool Festival features over 300 wool & fiber arts and vendors of materials and tools associated with all things wool make up the show. Natural fiber producing livestock such as angora rabbits, llamas & alpacas, musk oxen and many different breeds of sheep and goats are showcased.

=== Hudson Valley Wine and Food Festival ===
In addition to entertainment, the festival features hundreds of vendors offering samples of fine wine, craft beverages, gourmet specialty foods, and artisan products.

=== Rhinebeck Antiques Fair ===
Each spring collectors and dealers from the region feature Americana, Folk Art, Antique Jewelry, Mid-Century Modern and Home and Garden Décor.

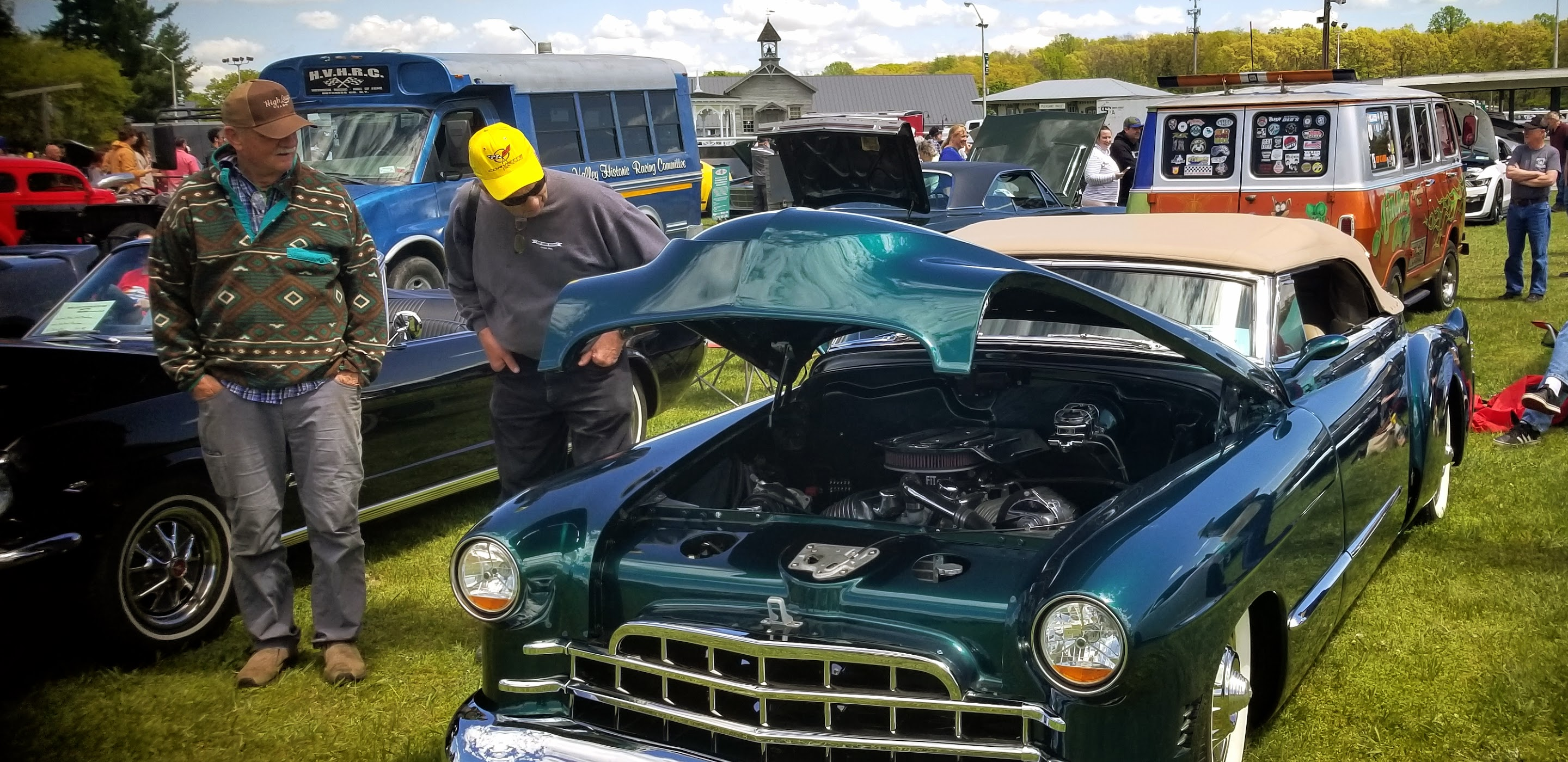
On the first weekend in May, vintage and classic cars, hot rods, and custom pickups rally to the Rhinebeck Antique Car Show and Swap Meet.

=== Classic car shows ===
The two day event features the hot rods, customs and imports, with no cut off years on day one. The second day is reserved for original, restored, antique and classic vehicles.

=== Stock car racing ===
From 1922 through its closing in 1962, the Rhinebeck Speedway staged standard, midgets and stock car races on the grounds of the Dutchess County Fairgrounds. It included two tracks, a 1/2-mile (0.80 km) dirt oval for standard race cars and an inner 1/5-mile (0.32 km) paved oval that was used for midget car racing.
