= Rhinebeck =

Rhinebeck may refer to:

- Rhinebeck (village), New York
- Rhinebeck (town), New York
- Old Rhinebeck Aerodrome, a living museum in Red Hook, New York
- Rhinebeck and Connecticut Railroad
- New York State Sheep and Wool Festival, held in Rhinebeck, New York

== See also ==
- Reinbek
