= Horatio Potter =

American Episcopalian bishop (1802–1887)

The Right Reverend Horatio Potter
- 6th Bishop of New York
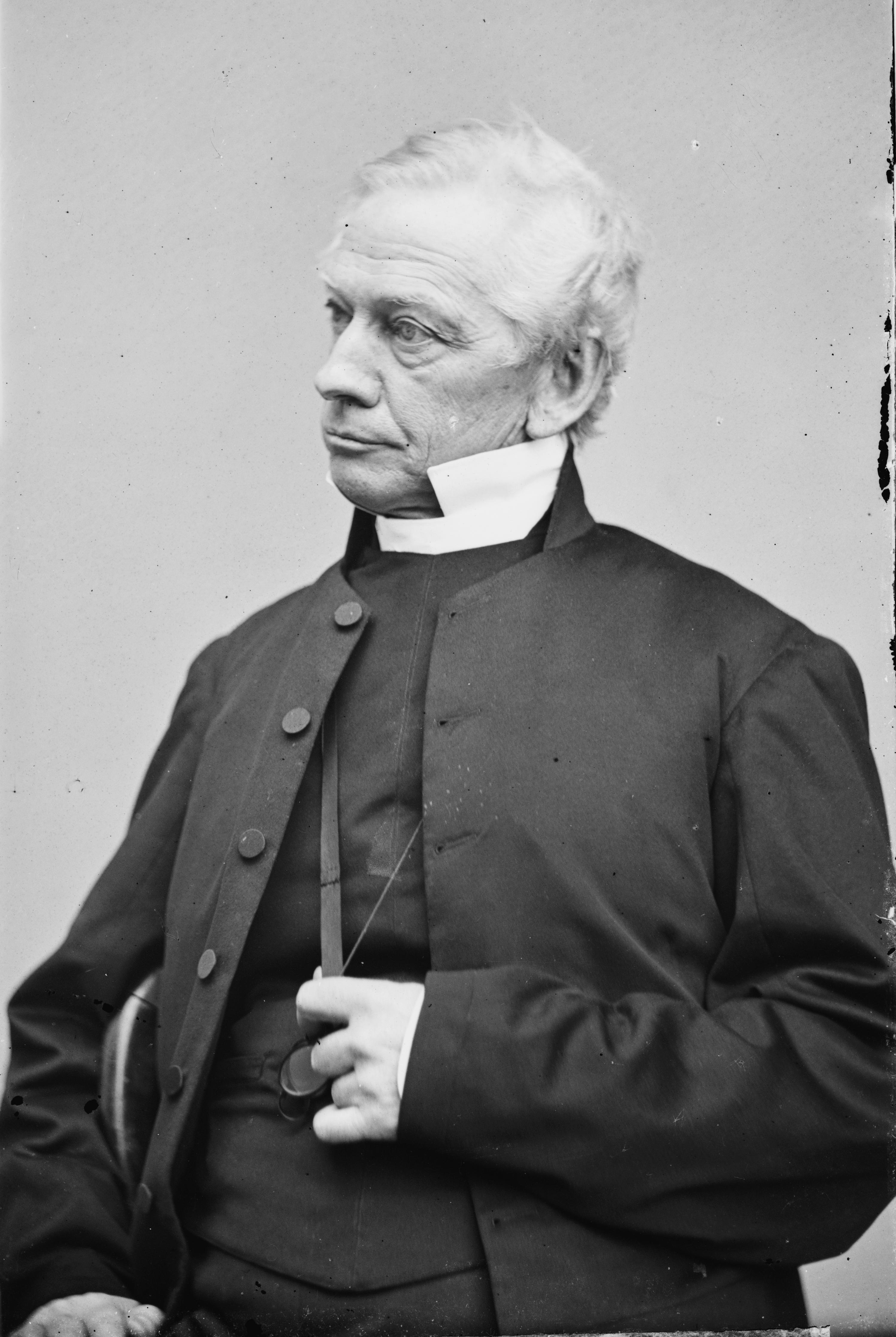
- Potter, 1855–1865
- Church: Episcopal Church
- Diocese: New York
- Elected: September 29, 1854
- In office: 1854–1887
- Predecessor: Jonathan Mayhew Wainwright
- Successor: Henry C. Potter

Orders
- Ordination: July 15, 1827 (deacon); December 14, 1828 (priest) by John Henry Hobart
- Consecration: November 22, 1854 by Thomas Church Brownell

Personal details
- Born: February 9, 1802 Beekman, New York, US
- Died: January 2, 1887 (aged 84) New York City, US
- Parents: Joseph Potter & Anne Knight
- Spouse: Mary Jane Tomlinson (m. 1827, d. 1847); Mary Atchison Pollock (m. 1849)
- Children: 8
- Education: Union College

Horatio Potter (February 9, 1802 – January 2, 1887), was an educator and the sixth bishop of the Episcopal Diocese of New York.

== Dearth of biographical information ==
Potter "shrank from public notice, left no literary monument and has, regrettably, no biography. He is scarcely mentioned in the biographies of his older brother Alonzo, Bishop of Pennsylvania, and of his nephew, Henry Codman Potter, his successor in the See of New York." His life is described in a book about the Potter family of colonial New England.

== Early life and education ==
Horatio Potter, D.D., LL.D., S.T.D. was born on February 9, 1802, the youngest of the nine children to Joseph and Anne Potter. Through his grandparents Thomas Potter and Esther Sheldon, respectively, Horatio was descended from the co-founders of Rhode Island, William Arnold and Roger Williams. The Potters were Quaker farmers who lived near Beekman (now LaGrange) in Dutchess County, New York. "Their Quaker devotion appears in the names they bestowed on their oldest son, Paraclete, and only daughter, Philadelphia." Potter spent his earliest years at the family homestead.

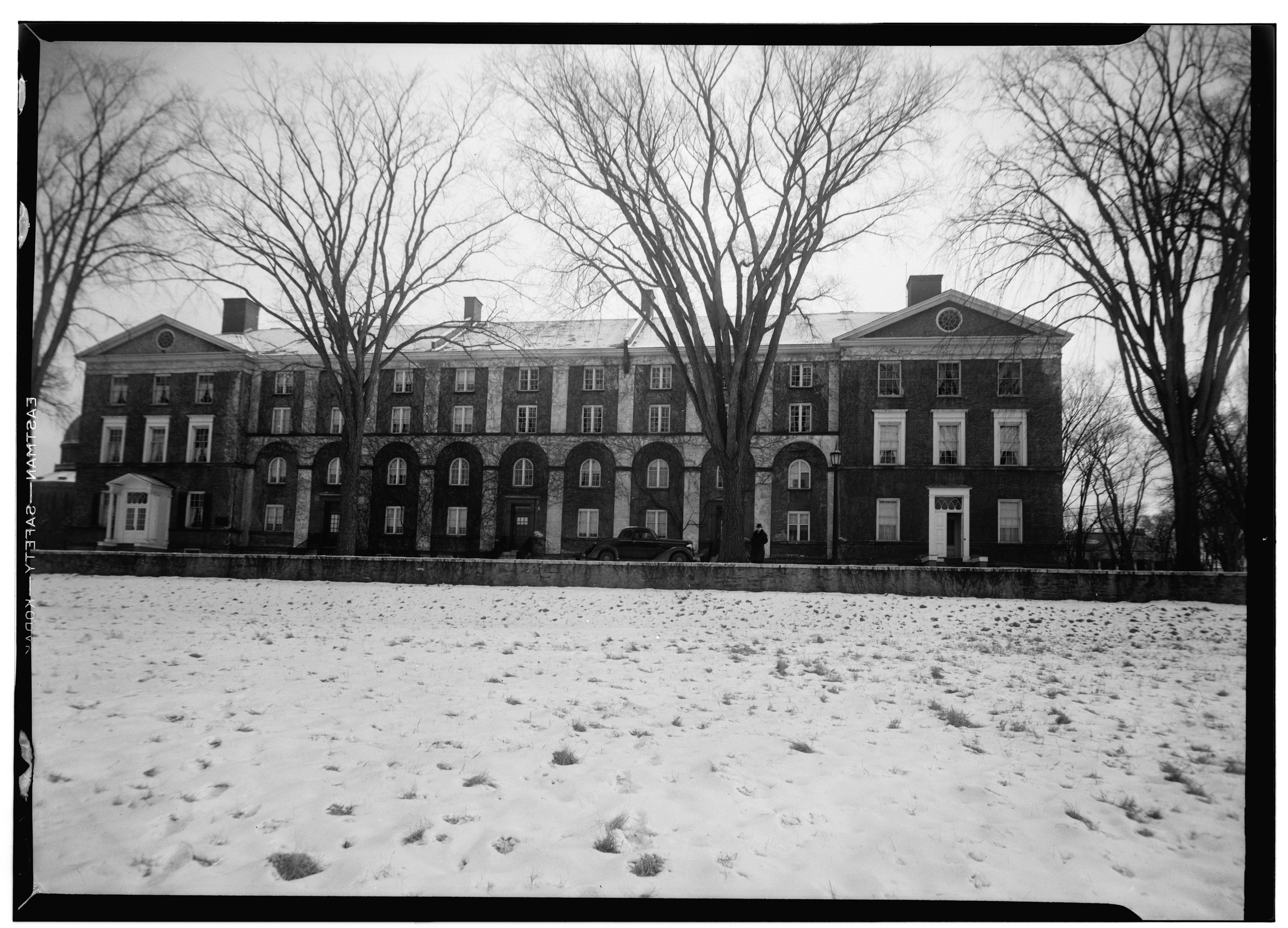
Union College, Schenectady, N. Y.

Paraclete Potter, Horatio's elder brother, was established in Poughkeepsie, New York, where the Poughkeepsie Academy was located. Therefore, in 1812, he had his ten-year-old brother Horatio move in with him and enroll in the Academy, which offered a better education than did the district schools in Beekman. While living with his brother, Horatio went with him to Christ Episcopal Church in Poughkeepsie, and he was impressed by the worship service. During his ten years in Poughkeepsie, Horatio "clerked at various times in his brother's book store." Horatio remained with his brother through 1822. He wanted a college education, and, with his brother Alonzo's help. Horatio went to Union College, Schenectady, New York. He graduated in 1826 with a Bachelor of Arts degree.

After graduation, Horatio Potter followed his older brother Alonzo into the Episcopal Church. He was confirmed by Bishop John Henry Hobart at St. Thomas' Church in New York and began studying for holy orders. Thus, Potter had no seminary training.

== Professor at Washington College: 1828–1833 ==
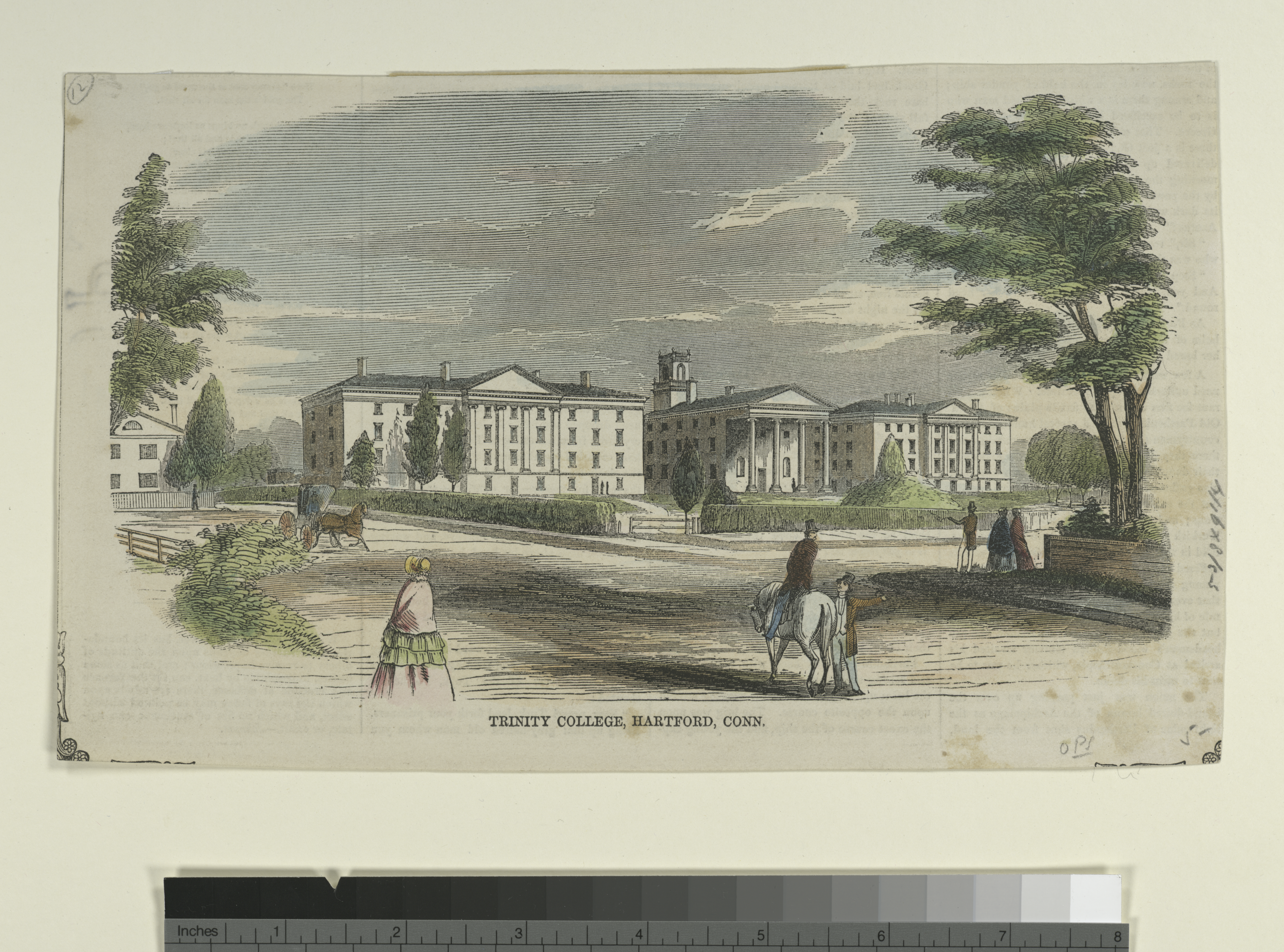
Trinity College, Hartford

Potter was ordained deacon on July 15, 1827, and priest on December 14, 1828. He served his several months diaconate at Trinity Church, Saco, Maine. In 1828, Potter was elected professor of mathematics and natural philosophy at Washington College (now Trinity College), Hartford, Connecticut). While there, Potter "took an active part in plans for the enlargement of the college and the erection of its new buildings."

== Marriages and children ==
Potter was twice married. His first marriage was to Mary Jane Tomlinson on September 22, 1827, with whom he had six children. On June 8, 1847, Mrs. Potter, "who had been the loved helpmeet of her husband in every good work," died. She left six children, five of them under twelve. In his loss, Potter perceived "the loving purposes of God." He believed that his loss would add "earnestness and tenderness" to his "efforts to edify and console" his parishioners. Their children were as follows:

- Charles Henry [born July 6, 1828; died January 30, 1830]
- Mary Jane [born February 23, 1830; died September 30, 1834]
- Anna [born September 10, 1831]
- David T. [1836],
- Phoebe [1838],
- Horatio [1840],
- Robert Minturn [1843],
- William Bleecker [born March 25, 1845; died July 14, 1914](Professor of Geology), and
- Mary Jane Potter Chauncey [born May 1, 1847; died September 9, 1936] (Mrs. Elihu Chauncey).

In 1852, Potter took a holiday in Scotland, during which he met Mary Atchison Pollock, a forty-two-year-old Scottish lady. They corresponded after his return to Albany, during which Potter proposed marriage. Pollock accepted his proposal in 1853. When she arrived in New York, Potter met her at the dock and escorted her to Trinity Church for their wedding. There were no children by this marriage.

== St. Peter's Church, Albany: 1833-1854 ==
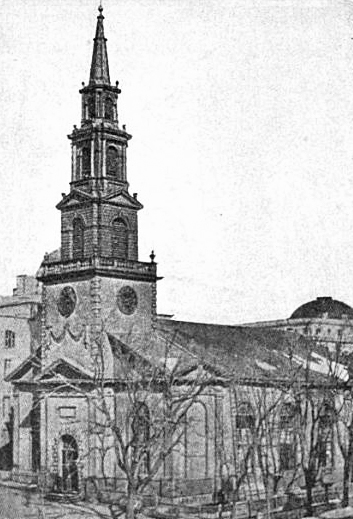
St Peter's Episcopal Church

On February 27, 1833, Potter accepted the rectorship of St. Peter's Church, Albany, New York. He was instituted as rector on Saturday, May 11, 1833. In his first sermon, preached the next day, Potter said, "My brethren, I present myself before you today as your spiritual pastor–as your servant for Jesus' sake! . . . Give me, then, my brethren, I entreat you, your sympathy, your hearty support, and above all your fervent prayers."

Potter soon "gained the respect and regard of all his parishioners," and "a high position" among the men of Albany. In all the "charitable and philanthropic" enterprises, he served not only as a "judicious adviser," but also as a financial contributor. His ability was also recognized by other clergy. Potter remained as rector of St. Peter's for twenty-one years until his election as provisional bishop of New York in 1854. During his tenure there, "he modernized the church both spiritually and physically."

The first act of modernizing the church physically was in 1834 by the purchase of a new organ. This was followed in 1835 by renovating the church building: repairing the floors and pews, painting the interior, a new pulpit, addition of a vestry room, and new lamps. In 1847, a new Rectory was built.

On June 1, 1835, the parish, having noticed Potter's impaired heath, the Vestry requested Potter to do whatever he thought best to restore his health. Following the Vestry's request, Potter spent the summer of 1835 abroad, principally in England. "He returned much refreshed."

On November 7, 1837, in Alton, Illinois, a pro-slavery mob killed the abolitionist and newspaper publisher Elijah Parish Lovejoy. In response, on November 26, 1837, Potter preached a sermon in which he defended a free press and opposed slavery. Regarding the latter, he said, "Let us not refuse to think sometimes of the poor slave, whose rights to the products of his own labour, to the care of his own happiness, to the direction of his own physical, intellectual and moral energies are all invaded.... Let us not sit down contentedly with the thought, that this train of misery and guilt, this national blot, is to be perpetuated forever."

In 1837, Potter declined his election as president of Washington College (now Trinity College), Hartford, Connecticut.

On April 25, 1841, Potter was invited to deliver a Discourse on the Death of William Henry Harrison to the New York State Legislature in St. Peter's Church, after the death of President William Henry Harrison. His theme was "Uprightness and Religious Character in Rulers." Rather than a conventional eulogy, Potter's address included "a probing analysis of the evils of political life" and an "eloquent characterization" of Harrison.

On July 23, 1843, Potter preached a sermon on The Stability of the Church, as Seen in Her History and in Her Principles. In the sermon, he said that "our Church occupies, let it ever be remembered, a middle ground, in regard to its doctrines, discipline and worship, between Romanism on the one side and ultra Protestantism on the other." In this statement, Potter articulated the via media position.

On January 3, 1845, Potter's bishop, Benjamin T. Onderdonk was sentenced to suspension from "the exercise of his ministry and of his office as bishop." This gave Potter the additional task of overseeing the missions in upstate New York. Later in 1845, a voyage to England was offered made to Potter. On May 26, 1845, the Vestry of St. Peter's "resolved unanimously" that their Rector should take the voyage and expressed "their high estimate of his services and character." Potter was accompanied by his wife. In England, being of the high church persuasion, he met with "several of the leaders of the Oxford Movement," such as John Keble, Isaac Williams, Edward Bouverie Pusey, George Moberly, and William Skinner, Bishop of Aberdeen. Potter returned to Albany in the autumn of 1845 "in greatly improved health and spirits."

In January 1849, St. Peter's faced a debt crisis, which, if not solved, would result in the loss of all of St. Peter's property including the church building and rectory. Previous vestries had paid annual deficits by selling of portions of the income producing real estate owned until all of it had been sold, leaving only the lot on which the church building and rectory were located. The 1849 Vestry took immediate action to relieve the parish's "great burden of debt." With the debt crisis resolved, St. Peter's was freed to devote "greater energy and devotion" for work by Potter and his parishioners "for the advancement of the Church in the city, and the engaging in new works of piety and mercy."

Potter was characterized by Joseph Hooper, who wrote A History of Saint Peter's Church in the City of Albany, as one of "the most honored and distinguished of the rectors of St. Peter's." While at St. Peter's, Potter was often asked whether he would accept election as a bishop, but he "discouraged every movement toward his election" until his election as bishop of the Diocese of New York of which St. Peter's was a part.

== Ministry as Bishop: New York 1854–1887 ==
In 1854, Bishop Wainwright, the provisional bishop of the Episcopal Diocese of New York died after two years of strenuous work repairing "the neglect caused by the seven years' vacancy in the episcopate." At the September 1854 Diocesan Convention, Potter was elected provisional bishop. He accepted the election. In his acceptance speech, Potter pleaded with his fellow Churchmen to "try to love each other, try to banish hard words, and satirical speeches, and uncharitable judgments from the Church of God."

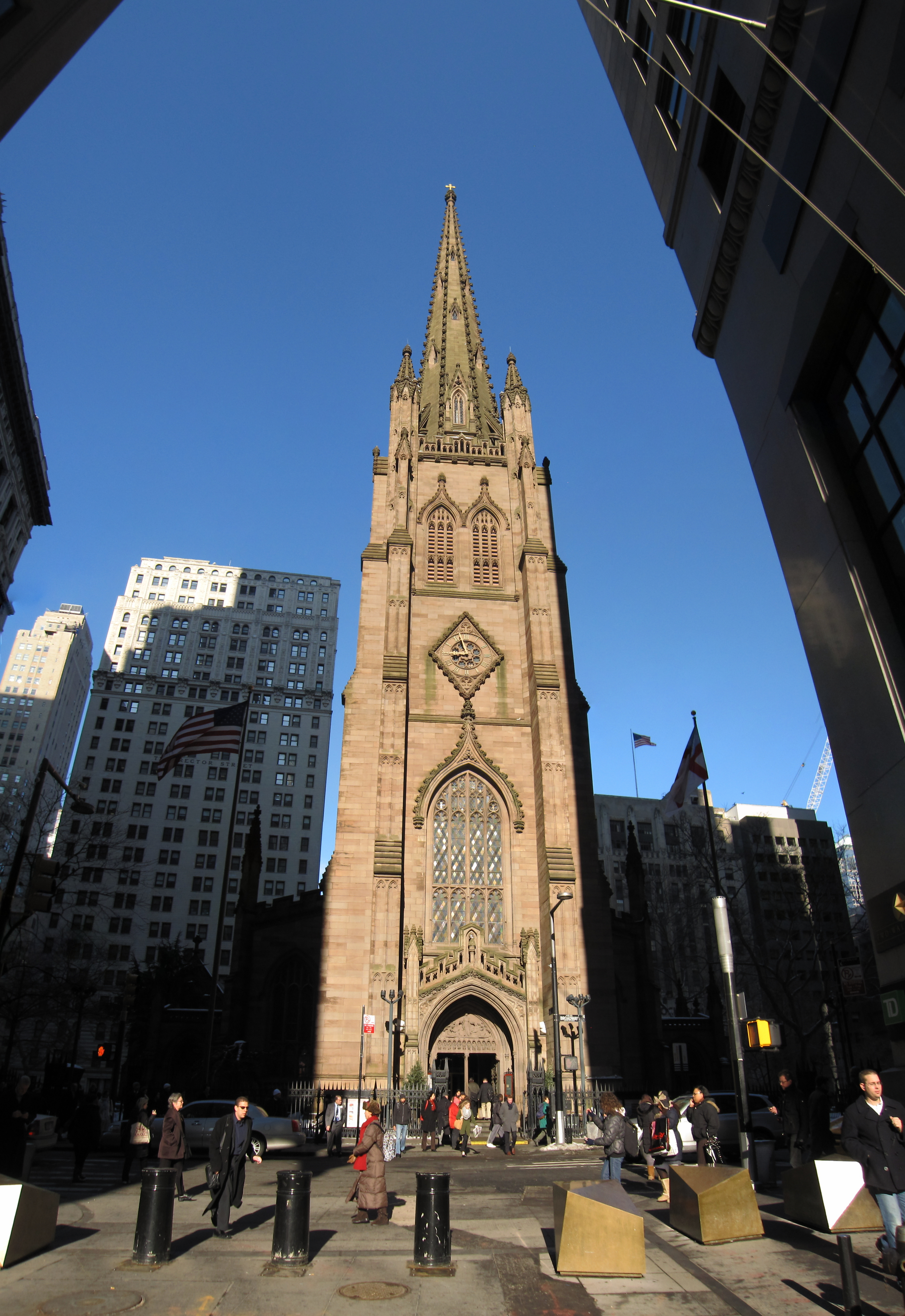
Trinity Church

On Wednesday, November 22, 1854, in Trinity Church, New York City, Potter was consecrated bishop. The church was filled to overflowing and "the service was probably the most impressive and elaborate that had ever been held in the American Church. He became bishop of a diocese in "a state of great depression and disquiet, owing to the controversies that resulted from the trial and suspension of the Bishop Onderdonk." Potter's episcopate spanned "years of national division, ecclesiastical tensions between high and low church factions, and momentous economic and social changes in New York."

=== Bard College ===
In 1860, St. Stephen's College at Annandale-on-Hudson, New York, was established under Potter's leadership. It was subsequently renamed Bard College. In Chapter Two ("The Professor, the Bishop, and the Country Squire: Bard College") of the History of Bard College, Potter is "the Bishop" and he is described as one of the three men "whose efforts brought the College into being." He "gave the College his unfaltering support," and he was a member of the College's original Board of Trustees.

Bard College's "Stone Row" (now used as a dormitory) was built as part of the original St. Stephen's College campus. It consists of four adjacent buildings: North Hoffman, South Hoffman, Potter, and McVickar. The Potter building was named after Bishop Horatio Potter.

Bishop Onderdonk died on April 30, 1861. With this, Potter's position changed from "provisional bishop" to Bishop of the Diocese of New York. He "discharged the duties" of this office until three years and eight months before he died.

On December 12, 1860, Potter issued a pastoral letter addressed To the Clergy and Laity of the Diocese of New York. The date was a month after the election of Abraham Lincoln as president of the United States and a month before the beginning of the American Civil War. He said that the occasion for the letter was the "impending calamity" of the "political fabric" of the United States being torn apart "by the conflict of sectional passions." In the face of this "crisis," Potter called on "every man that loves his country" to the "duty of carrying out those principles of conciliation and compromise, on which this government was founded, and by adhering to which alone it can be maintained." At the same time, he recognized that "such a work calls for kindness, and patience and conciliation in rulers and in people. It demands a magnanimous and patriotic spirit."

=== Cathedral of St. John the Divine ===
The Cathedral of St. John the Divine in New York City was founded by Potter. About 1828, the general idea of the cathedral had been formulated. However, nothing was done about it until 1872, when Potter's Diocesan Convention gave the idea unanimous support. The next year, Potter obtained from the New York state legislature a charter for the cathedral. Potter was the first president of the board of trustees. However, nothing more was done until the episcopate of his nephew Henry C. Potter.

=== Community of Saint Mary ===
Potter instituted the Community of St. Mary on February 2, 1865. The Institution was held in St. Michael's Church, Bloomingdale. The five candidates stood in front of Potter. He addressed and questioned the candidates about "their willingness to live in obedience and persevere in the work of the Lord." After the questions had been answered satisfactorily, the candidates knelt. Potter and the priests encircled and prayed for them. Then, Potter took each candidate by the right hand, received her into the Community of Saint Mary, gave her his episcopal blessing. This was the first time since the Dissolution of the Monasteries in England in the sixteenth century that an Anglican Bishop constituted a religious community.

=== Strict Interpretation of Canons ===
Potter, unlike his older brother Alonzo Potter was a "High Church" proponent" This position led to an 1865 pastoral letter to his clergy in which Potter said that he expected a strict interpretation of the Episcopal Church's "exclusionary canon." This meant that no person not episcopally ordained in the Episcopal Church would be allowed to officiate or teach in an Episcopal Church and that no Episcopal Church clergyman should officiate or preach in the church of another denomination. Potter's "Evangelical clergy" were "dumbfounded" by his interpretation of the canon, and a number of them protested it. These included Eli Hawley Canfield and Stephen H. Tyng whose son Stephen H. Tyng, Jr. soon thereafter preached in a Methodist church. For this action, the younger Tyng was subjected to a Board of Inquiry and "condemned for breach of the canons." When Potter sentenced the younger Tyng to an "admonition," the elder Tyng stepped forward and handed Potter a written protest against "this whole proceeding."

In 1873, after Bishop George David Cummins had left the Protestant Episcopal Church to establish the Reformed Episcopal Church, a New York Herald reporter "cajoled" a "flustered and reluctant" Potter out of his sickroom. The reporter asked how much the "Reformed Episcopal" movement would affect the Protestant Episcopal Church. Potter answered, "No more, Sir, than a mosquito bite would affect the stonewall of the reservoir on Fifth Avenue."

In 1874, he strongly opposed the proposal for a Church Congress that would discuss pressing social issues, writing that "With regard to the Church in this country, I entirely concur in the opinion expressed by one of our most venerable, learned and thoughtful Bishops, that what we need pre-eminently is not talk, but work."

On November 29, 1879, the twenty-fifth anniversary of Potter's consecration was celebrated at New York's Academy of Music. He was given a testimonial in the form of a casket of gold, silver, and steel, modeled after the ancient Ark of the Covenant."

=== Failing health ===
In September 1883, his "failing health" forced Potter to ask for an assistant so that he could "be relieved of the administration of the diocese." The Diocesan Convention elected his brother Bishop Alonzo Potter's son Henry C. Potter, who was at the time rector of Grace Church, New York. Horatio Potter remained "bishop in name" until he died.

== Evaluation of Potter's ministry ==
Potter's ministry both "as rector and as bishop was marked by energy and success." During Potter's episcopate, the Diocese of New York grew so much that in 1868 the new dioceses of Albany, Central New York, and Long Island were removed from his diocese.

Potter worked "to reach the laboring classes and the poor, to popularize the church, draw the plainer sort of people into its fold, and push Episcopal home missions in New York city and in the rural districts." The former controversies in his diocese became "practically unknown." Potter was "known and respected at home and abroad."

== Honorary degrees ==
In 1938, Potter "received the degree of Doctor in Divinity (D.D.) from Washington College (now Trinity College), Hartford, Connecticut." In 1856, he received the degree of Doctor of Laws (LL.D.) from Hobart College In 1860, the University of Oxford conferred on him the degree of Doctor of Sacred Theology (S.T.D.).

== Illness, death, and funeral ==
On May 3, 1883, in the Church of the Incarnation in New York City, Potter held his last service. After that, he became ill, an "illness from which he never recovered." His last days were spent at his home in New York. He died at home on January 2, 1887.

Potter was buried in the Poughkeepsie Rural Cemetery at Poughkeepsie, New York. On January 8, 1887 The New York Times ran article entitled "Bishop Potter's Funeral" with the subtitle "Trinity Thronged with Sorrowing Friends." The article said,

From the time of the brief services at the Bishop's home early in the morning, until the interment at Poughkeepsie, when the shadows of the day were lengthening, the ceremonies were marked by a quiet taste akin to the prelate's habits of life, and through all coursed manifest sorrow for the dead and sympathy for the mourners. The special train bringing the Bishop's remains to Poughkeepsie arrived at 2:30. When the cortege started from the railway station for Poughkeepsie Rural Cemetery it was composed of twenty carriages and two large carryall sleighs. As the cortege made its way through Poughkeepsie city streets the tolling of the bells of the Episcopal churches added to the solemnity of the occasion. Following services at the gravesite, the casket was lowered into the grave with the lid covered with violets and evergreens for what was thought to be at the time Bishop Potter's final rest. The funeral party departed for the railway station for their return to New York City.

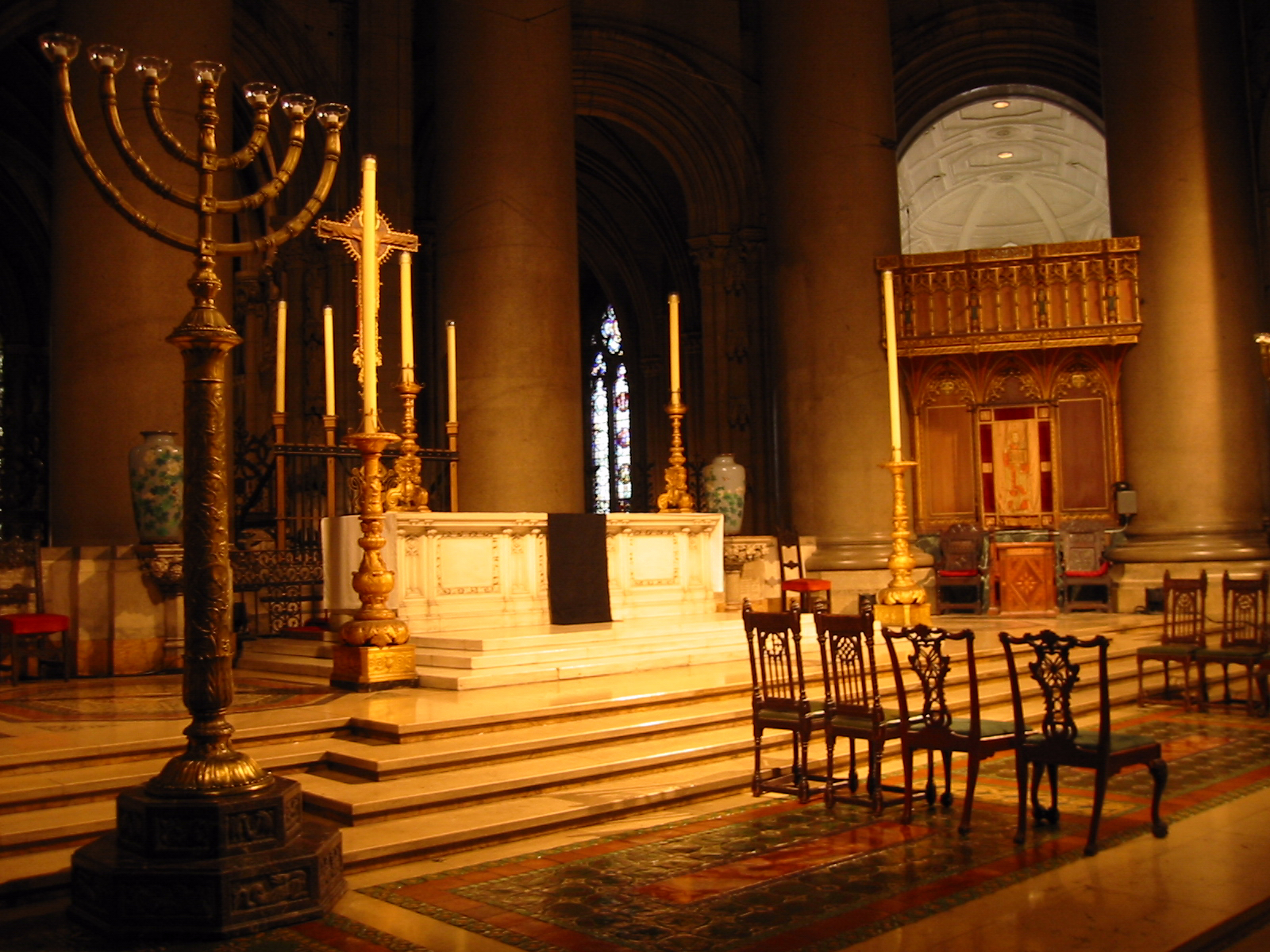
St John The Divine High Altar

=== Re-interred in the Cathedral of St. John the Divine ===
In 1921, the remains of Potter were moved to a tomb directly behind the high altar in the Cathedral of St. John the Divine. Above the tomb was placed a white marble Sarcophagus. This is the place which is traditionally reserved for founders of cathedrals. The tomb was consecrated on December 27, 1921.

== Legacy ==
During the American Civil War, Potter's "patriotism was marked, and at all times his labors for the ignorant, poor, and sick were continuous and efficient." In 1865, he wrote a "fraternal letter" to the Southern bishops in advance of the Philadelphia General Convention, expressing the Northern bishops' wish "to greet their brethren in the Episcopate with the kindliest feeling."

An 1884 book described Potter in this way:

Bishop Horatio Potter is regarded as one of the ablest scholars in the denomination. . . . In person he is tall and thin, erect in carriage, and of active step. His utterances are calm and dignified, full of earnestness, and ever displaying a gentle Christian spirit. Universally popular in his denomination among both clergy and laity, he has labored in the ministry with very great success.

The National Cyclopedia of American Biography published in 1898 was composed of "the biographical sketches of all persons prominently connected with the history of the nation." A sketch of Potter was included in the book.

== Works by or relating to Potter ==
MC: Potter was marked by developed scholarship and literary skill. His addresses, sermons, and contributions to Church periodicals "exerted a strong and wholesome influence."

=== Discourses and writings by Potter ===
- Truth to Be Maintained by Reason, Not by Physical Power: A Discourse Preached in St. Peter's Church, Albany on the 26th of November, 1827.
- An Introductory Sermon, preached in St. Peter's Church, Albany, on Sunday Morning, May 12, 1833 Being the Day After His Institution As rector of Said Church. (Packard and Van Benthuysen, 1833).
- Importance of Liberal Tastes and Good Intellectual Habits as a Provision for Pure and Permanent Enjoyment: Being an Introductory Lecture, delivered on the 5th December, 1837, before the Young Men's Association of Troy. (Tuttle, Belcher & Burton, 1837.)
- Intellectual Liberty; Or, Truth to be Maintained by Reason, Not by Physical Power: A Discourse Preached in St. Peter's Church, Albany, on the 26th of November, 1837 (Packard and Benthuysen, 1837).
- Discourse on the Death of William Henry Harrison, Late President of the United States: Delivered before the Two Houses of the Legislature of the State of New-York, in St. Peter's Church, Albany, on the 25th day of April, 1841 (Hoffman, White and Visscher, 1841).
- The Stability of the Church, as Seen in Her History and in Her Principles: A Sermon, preached in St. Peter's Church, Albany, on Sunday, the Twenty-third Day of July (Erastus H. Pease, 1843).
- http://anglicanhistory.org/usa/hpotter/rightly_dividing1844.html Rightly Dividing the Word of Truth: A Sermon, on the Religious Tendencies of the Age, and the Consequent Duty of the Christian Minister. Preached in St. Peter's Church, Albany, on Sunday, Nov. 23, 1844 (Erastus H. Pease, 1844).]
- Remarks in Favor of Free Churches: Being Part of an Address delivered on the Occasion of Laying the Corner Stone of a Free Church at Fort Edward, Washington County, N.Y. (Erastus H. Pease, 1845).
- Submission to Government: The Christian's Duty: A Sermon for the Third Sunday after Easter (Stanford and Swords, 1848).
- Christian Suffering, Its Dignity and Its Efficacy: A Sermon Occasioned by the Death of the Hon. Ambrose Spencer and Preached in St. Peter's Church, Albany, on Sunday, March 19, 1848 (Joel Munsell, 1849).
- A Tribute to the Memory of a Faithful Public Servant: A Sermon on Occasion of the Death of President Taylor (Aaron Hill, 1850).
- The Duties of Justice as They Affect the Individual and the State: A Sermon (Weed, Parsons and Co., 1850).
- Free Will Offerings with An Holy Worship: A Sermon Preached at the Consecration of St. James' Church, Syracuse, November 15, 1853. (No place: no publisher, 1853).
- The Minister of Christ Not of the World. A Discourse Delivered in the Chapel of the General Theological Seminary, N.Y., Dec. 16, 1855, Being the Third Sunday in Advent, on Occasion of the Annual Matriculation (Pudney and Russell, 1856.
- A Pastoral Letter to the Laity of the Diocese of New-York, on the Duty of Making a More Just and Adequate Provision for the Support of the Parochial Clergy (Pudney and Russell, 1857).
- Remarks on Confirmation, or Duties of Pastors and People in Reference to the Use of the Means of Grace (Thomas C. Butler, 1857).
- To the Clergy and Laity of the Diocese of New York (New York, no publisher, 1860).
- Bishop Potter of New-York to Strangers Arriving from Foreign Parts, and to the Dispersed Members of the Episcopal Church in the Diocese of New-York (New York, no publisher, c. 1860).
- To the Clergy and Laity of the Diocese of New York: Prayers Appointed to Be Used in the Diocese of New York (New York, no publisher, 1861).
- A Sermon Commemorative of the Life and Services of the Rev. Samuel H. Turner, D.D., Late Professor of Biblical Literature in the General Theological Seminary. Preached in St. Peter's Church, New York, October 8, 1862, by the Rev. Samuel R. Johnson, D.D., to which is Prefixed the Address Delivered at the Funeral, December 24, 1861, by the Rt. Rev. Horatio Potter (Edward O. Jenkins, 1863).
- A Form of Prayer to Be Used in the Diocese of New-York, on Thursday, the Thirtieth of April, A.D. 1863, set apart by the President of the United States, as a day of National Humiliation, Fasting and Prayer. (New York: no publisher, 1863).
- A Pastoral Letter to the Clergy of the Diocese of New York from the Bishop (New York: no publisher, 1865).
- The Light of the World: A Sermon Preached at the Consecration of the Right Rev. Henry A. Neely, D.D., as Bishop of Maine (F. J. Huntington and Company, 1867).
- Annual Address of the Bishop of New York Delivered in S. Paul's Chapel, New York, on Thursday, Oct 1st 1868 (No place: no publisher, 1868).
- Sermon Delivered at the Opening of the Primary Convention in the Church of the Holy Trinity, Brooklyn, N.Y. November 18th 1868 (American Church Press Company, 1869).
- Sermon Preached at St. Peter's Church, Albany, at the Opening of the Primary Convention of the Diocese of Albany, Wednesday, December 2, 1868 (Charles van Benthuysen and Sons, 1869).
- A Pastoral Letter to the Clergy and Laity of the Diocese of New York (Pott & Amery, 1869).
- Considerations for a Candid Mind Inquiring after Divine Truth (Pott, Young & Co., 1871).
- Faith in the Seen and in the Unseen. A Sermon Preached at the Consecration of St. Thomas' Chapel, New York, on the Feast of St. Thomas the Apostle, Saturday, December 21, 1872 (St Thomas Association for Parish Work, 1873).
- Some Observations on Science and Revelation: From the Episcopal Address to the Convention of the Diocese of New York, 1873 (Pott, Young & Co., 1873).
- A Letter from the Bishop of New-York, on the Proposed "Church Congress," Appointed to be Held in the Week of the Opening of the General Convention (J. W. Amerman, 1874).
- Address Delivered at the Annual Commencement of Union College, June 23, 1875, by Horatio Potter, D.D., LL.D., D.C. L. (Oxon.), Bishop of new York, An Alumnus and Honourary Chancellor of Union University (William H. Young, 1875).
- A Few Plain Truths and Serious Counsels for Young Men Preparing for the Sacred Ministry of the Church: An Address by the Bishop of New York to the Students of the General Theological Seminary, Delivered in the Chapel, on occasion of the Annual Matriculation, All Saints Day, Nov. 1st A.D., 1879 (Styles and Cash, 1879).

=== Works relating to Potter ===
- The Sermon at the Consecration of Horatio Potter, D.D., to the Episcopate, Preached by Appointment, in Trinity Church, New-York, on Wednesday, November 22, 1854 by Francis Fulford, Lord Bishop of Montreal (Church Depository, 1854.]
- The Pastoral Letter of the Rt. Rev. Horatio Potter, D.D., LL.D., D.C.L. and Its Assailants. Reprinted from the American Quarterly Church Review for October, 1865. (New York: no publisher, 1865).
- Review of "A Pastoral Letter to the Clergy of the Diocese of New York from the Bishop" by a Presbyter (New York: no publisher, 1865).
- The Pastoral Letter of the Rt. Rev. H. Potter with the Replies of the Rev. S. H. Tyng, the Rev. E. H. Canfield, the Rev. John Cotton Smith, the Rev. W. A. Muhlenberg (John A. Gray & Green, 1865).
- A Letter to the Right Rev'd Horatio Potter, D.D., LL.D., Bishop of the Protestant Episcopal Church in the Diocese of New York, Relating to the Proceedings Pending against the Rev. Stephen H. Tyng, Jr. by Effingham H. Nichols (Gibson Brothers, 1868).]
- Publications of the American Church Union, No. 1. The Tyng Case. A Narrative together with the Judgment of the Court and the Admonition by the Bishop of New York (Pott & Amery, 1868).
- Publications of the American Church Union, No. 2. Speech of Stephen P. Nash, Esq., For the Prosecution, in the Trial of the Rev. S. H. Tyng, Jr. (Pott & Amery, 1868).]
- Report of the Committee of Investigation in the Case of Rev. Edward Cowley. June 6, 1881 made to Potter (A. Livingston, 1881).

Episcopal Church (USA) titles
Preceded by Jonathan M. Wainwright	Bishop of New York; 1854–1887	Succeeded by Henry C. Potter
