= Miss Wool of America Pageant =

Former annual event focused on wool-related merchandise

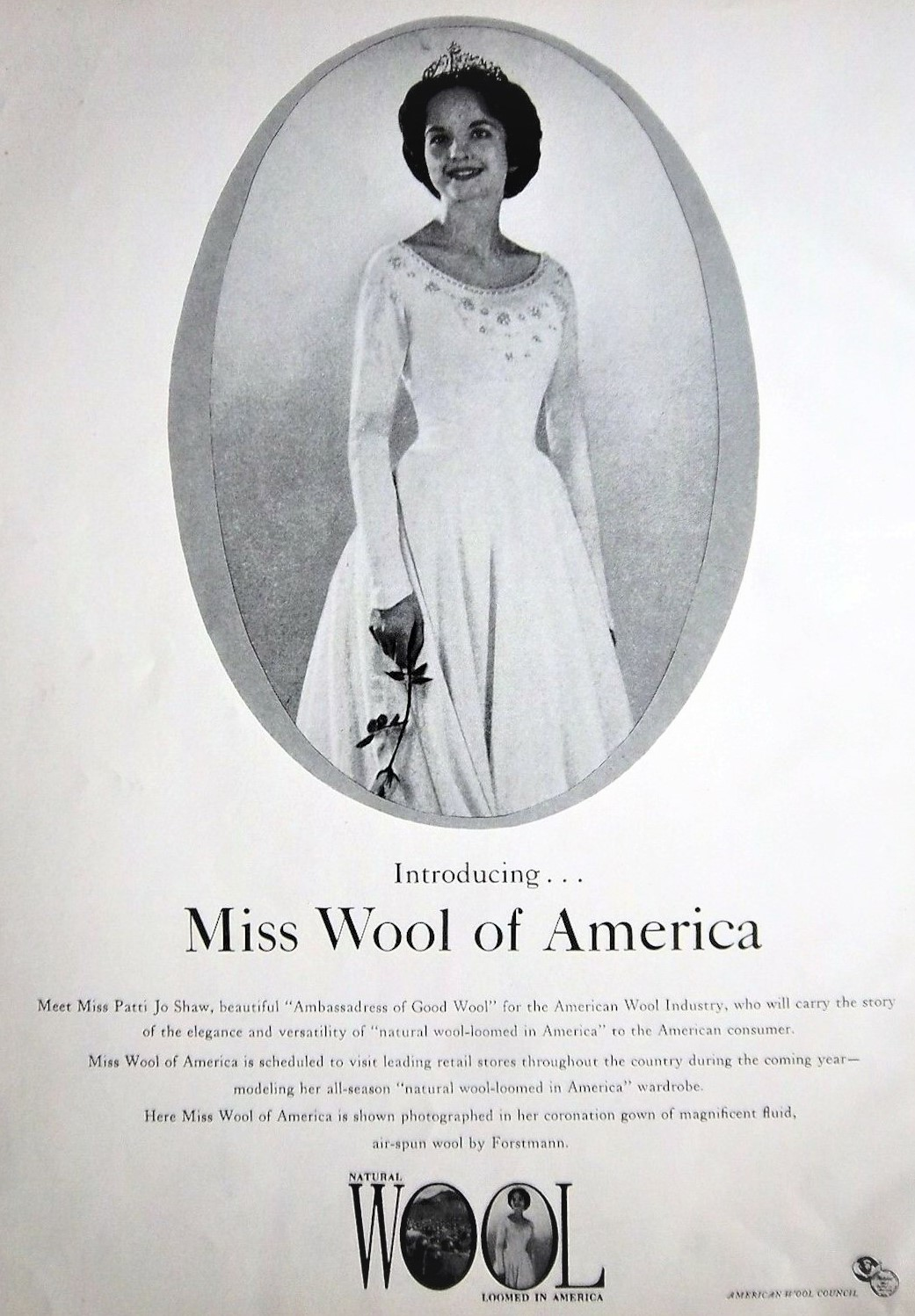
1960 Miss Wool Of America advertisement

The Miss Wool of America Pageant was a showcase of wool-related merchandise. It was an annual event organized by the National Wool Growers Association (U.S.), American Sheep Producers Council, and the Wool Bureau, Inc. at San Angelo, Texas, from 1952 to 1972. Originally a Texas-only event (the Miss Wool of Texas Pageant), it attracted wider entrants from 1958 and evolved into a national pageant. The winner would tour nationally wearing the latest in woolen fashion to promote the industry.

== History ==
The event was originally known as the Miss Wool of Texas Pageant and first began in 1952. The purpose of the event was primarily to celebrate the thriving sheep and wool industry of San Angelo. A young lady would be chosen to represent the wool industry in Texas as "Miss Wool" for a year. From 1958, contestants from various wool-producing regions of the United States competed. The event evolved into the Miss Wool of America Pageant, with Misses Wool from various states competing for the national title.

== Miss Wool ==
Miss Wool would go on tour dressed in the latest woolen fashions, representing the industry on a national level. Eighteen-year-old Cheri Slikker, in 1963, was the youngest winner of the title.

The American Sheep Producers Council, National Wool Growers Association, and the Wool Bureau were the sponsors. They funded a televised version of the competition in its later years which included the appearance of movie stars and popular musicians. The 1968 Miss Wool Pageant was broadcast live on color television. The hosts for the program were Jane Morgan and Donald O'Connor. In 1970, Nancy Ames and singer Jack Jones hosted the pageant.

=== Pageant winners ===
The first Miss Wool winner was Kathryn Gromatski in 1952. Winners of titles since then have included:

- 1957, Earline Whitt
- 1958, Miriam LaCour
- 1959, Carrell Currie
- 1960, Patti Jo Shaw
- 1961, Gayle Hudgens
- 1962, Carolyn Barre
- 1963, Cheri Slikker
- 1964, Suzy Beck
- 1965, Sharone Moline
- 1966, Elizabeth Peteel
- 1967, Allana Crimmins
- 1968, Mary Smiley
- 1969, Francis Mitchell
- 1970, Gail "Gus" Heinzmann
- 1971, Carey Andersen
- 1972, Barbara Ward

== See also ==
- New York State Sheep and Wool Festival
- Maryland Sheep and Wool Festival
