= Dutchess County Fair =

Annual festival

- Status: Active
- Frequency: Annually
- Venue: Dutchess County Fairgrounds
- Location: Rhinebeck, New York
- Coordinates: 41°56′24″N 73°54′36″W
- Country: United States
- Inaugurated: 1842; 184 years ago
- Most recent: August 20–25, 2024
- Website: dutchessfair.com

The Dutchess County Fair is held annually in Rhinebeck, New York, usually during the last full week in August. Currently, the fair hosts approximately half a million people per year, and is the second largest county fair in New York state.

== History ==
The Dutchess County Agricultural Society, formed in 1841, first organized the fair in 1842 at Washington Hollow in Pleasant Valley, New York. The fair was mainly started as an old-fashioned agricultural event in which farmers would come and show off their livestock, crops, and tools with a popular event being a plow competition. The fair initially alternated between Washington Hollow and Poughkeepsie before moving to Springbrook Park in Rhinebeck in 1919. The move was made following financial issues in the early 1900s and the subsequent cancellations of the 1916 and 1918 fairs.

The Society faced heavy debt in the Depression era after the cancellations of the 1927 and 1928 fairs due to flooding. The fair was also cancelled in 1942 due to World War II. A financial upturn in the late 1940s allowed the Society to repay its debt and acquire the Springbrook Park land renaming it to the Dutchess County Fairgrounds.

By the late 1950s, the Fair had grown to occupy double its size as it had in the 1930s.

The fair closed early in 2011 due to Hurricane Irene.

Recent additions to the fairgrounds include the restored Pleasant Valley Train Station. The fairgrounds now encompass 147 acres, straddling the village and town of Rhinebeck.
