= Sheep to shawl =

A sheep to shawl contest involves multiple teams that shear a sheep, spin the fleece into yarn, ply the yarn, and then weave it into a shawl. The winning team is judged on a combination of time and quality and difficulty of the design.

The world record team for the similar international sheep to sweater competition has been the Netherlands team for many years (5 hours 1 minute in 2016).
