= Maryland Sheep and Wool Festival =

American animal festival

Coordinates: 39°18′44″N 76°58′09″W

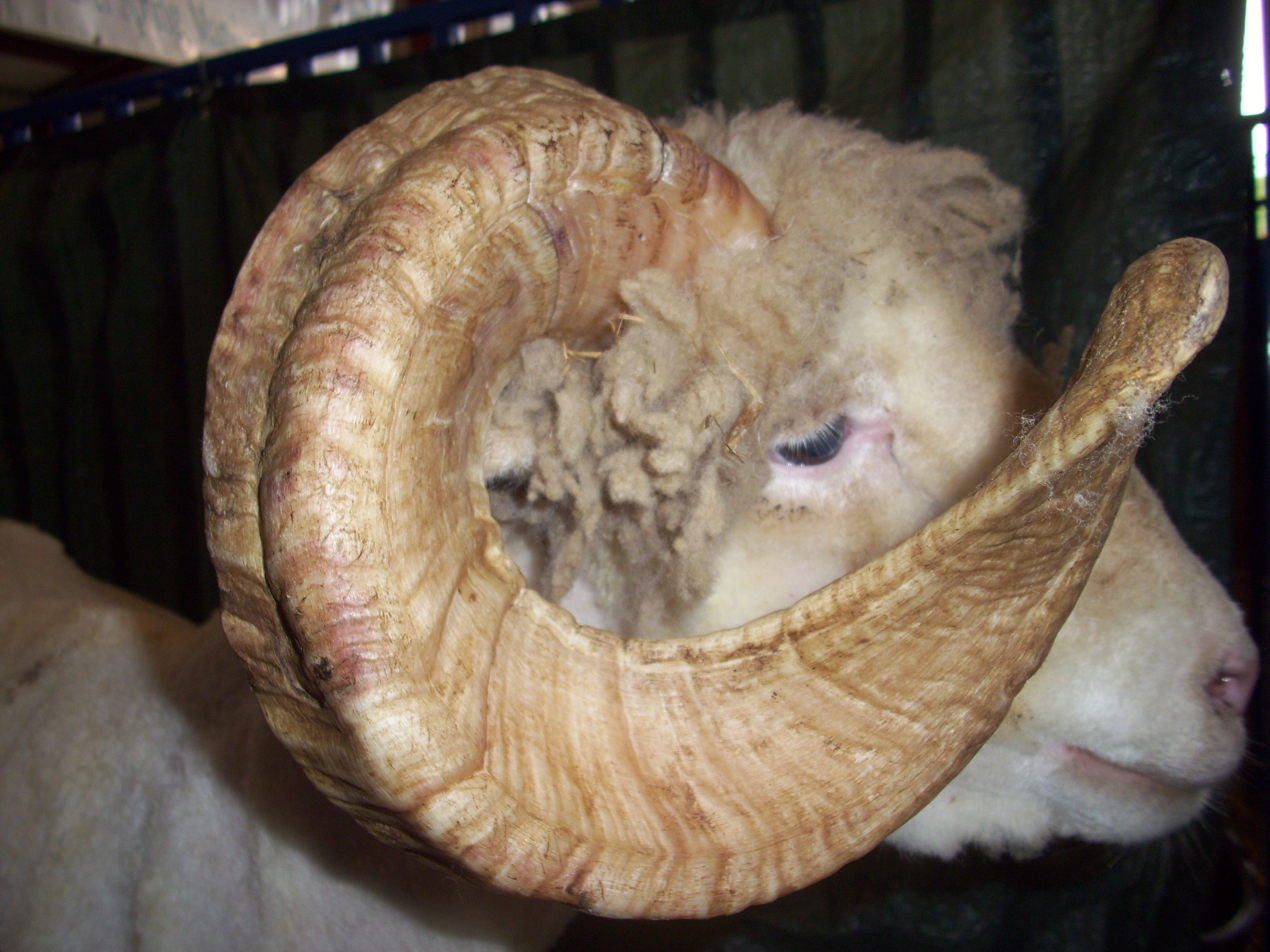
- Dorset Horn ram at the 2010 festival
- Begins: First full weekend in May
- Ends: Sunday
- Frequency: Annual
- Location: West Friendship, Maryland
- Inaugurated: 1973
- Participants: Knitters, sheep breeders, wool spinners

The Maryland Sheep and Wool Festival is an event featuring domestic sheep and wool. It is held at the Howard County Fairgrounds in West Friendship, Maryland.

== History ==
The festival was started in 1973. In 2003 it attracted over 70,000 people. The 2014 festival was the 40th consecutive. It is sponsored by the Maryland Sheep Breeders Association.

It is held annually during the first weekend in May at the Howard County Fairgrounds in West Friendship, Maryland. It has vendors of wool yarn, and judging of more than 30 sheep breeds. Vendors of other fiber-producing livestock such as goats, angora rabbits, llamas, and alpaca also attend.

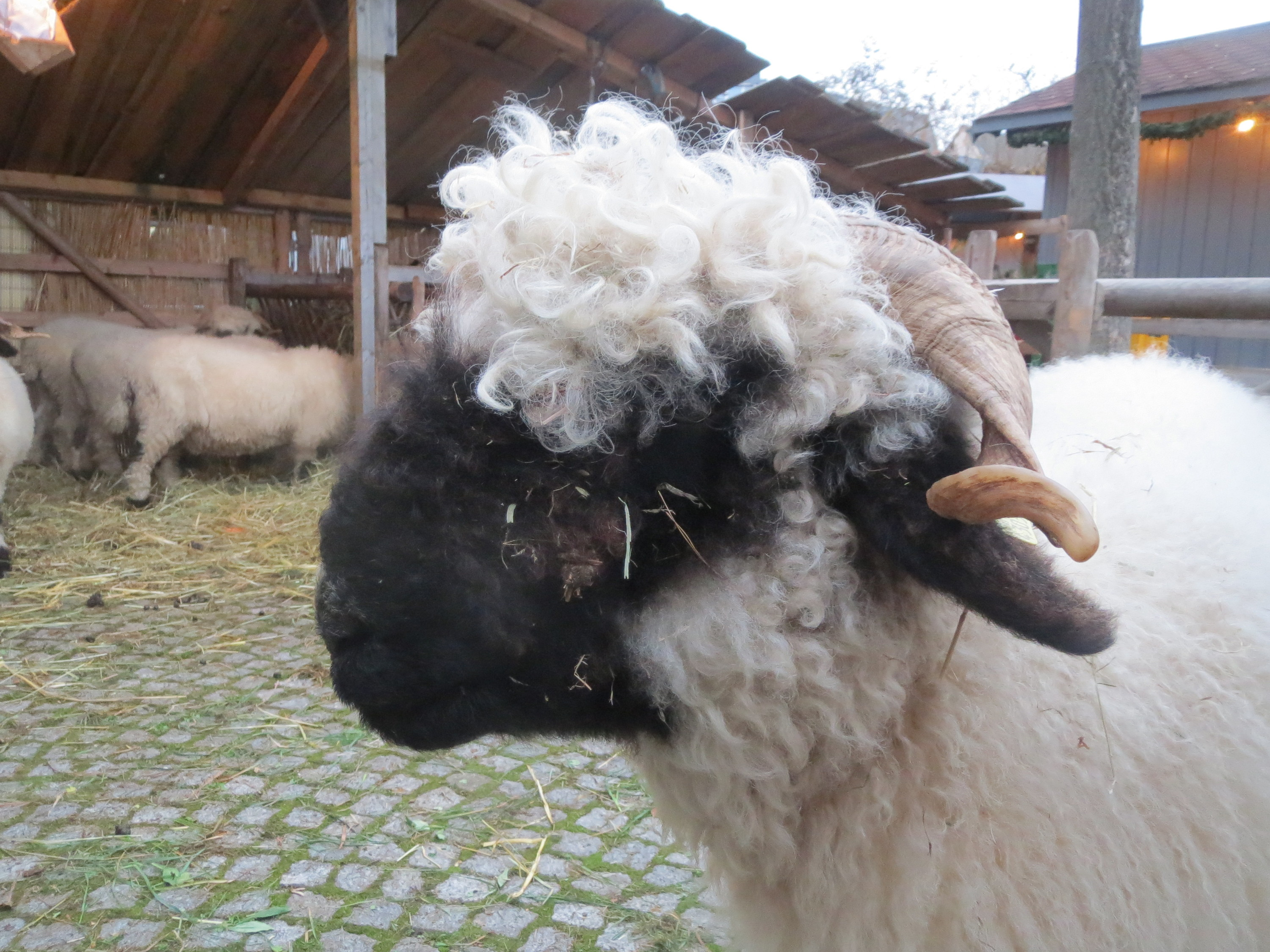
The 2025 "Featured Breed" the Valais Blacknose Sheep

A virtual festival was held in 2020 caused by the COVID-19 pandemic.

== See also ==
- New York State Sheep and Wool Festival
- Miss Wool of America Pageant
