= New York State Sheep and Wool Festival =

Annual gatherings of fiber-arts enthusiasts in the United States, aka "Rhinebeck"

Coordinates: 41.936787°N 73.905256°W

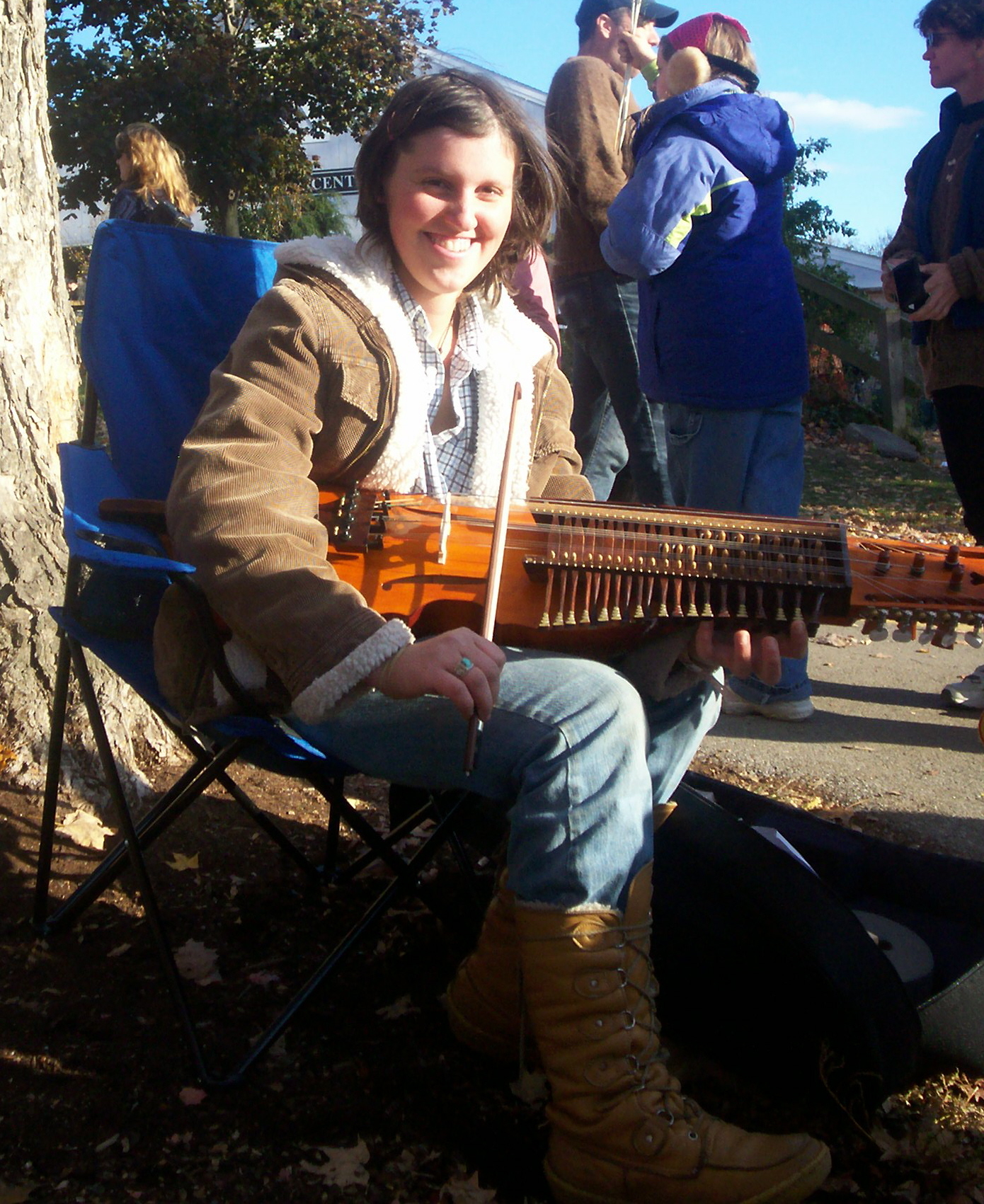
- Keyed fiddle at the 2006 festival
- Begins: Third weekend in October
- Ends: Sunday
- Frequency: Annual
- Location: Rhinebeck, New York
- Inaugurated: 1980
- Participants: Knitters, sheep breeders, wool spinners

The New York State Sheep and Wool Festival is an annual gathering of fiber-arts enthusiasts in the United States that draws approximately 30,000 visitors and more than 300 vendors. It is held at the Dutchess County Fairgrounds in Rhinebeck, New York.

== History ==
The festival was first held in 1980. It is attended by knitters, crocheters, handspinners, and growers of natural-fiber-producing livestock. The livestock includes sheep, goats, angora rabbits, llamas, musk oxen, and alpacas. It also includes vendors of the materials and tools associated with each. It is held in October of each year at the Dutchess County Fairgrounds in Rhinebeck, New York. In addition to the myriad vendors and demonstrations of fiber arts activities, the festival features several livestock competitions, sheepdog trials and a sheep to shawl contest.

In 2007 for the 35th festival about 12,000 people attended. 375 vendors applied for the 275 spaces.

Due to the COVID-19 pandemic, there was no live in-person festival in 2020. Officials instead moved events online to a virtual platform. The festival returned to in-person festivities in 2021, though there was a decrease in attendance. YouTuber KristyGlassKnits has a popular annual podcast called "Show Me Your Rhinebeck Sweater".

In 2022, The New York Times noted the increased interest in knitting and the festival among younger generations.

== See also ==
- Maryland Sheep and Wool Festival
- Miss Wool of America Pageant
