= St. Paul's School (New York) =

- St. Paul's School of Garden City, New York
- U.S. National Register of Historic Places
- U.S. Historic district – Contributing property
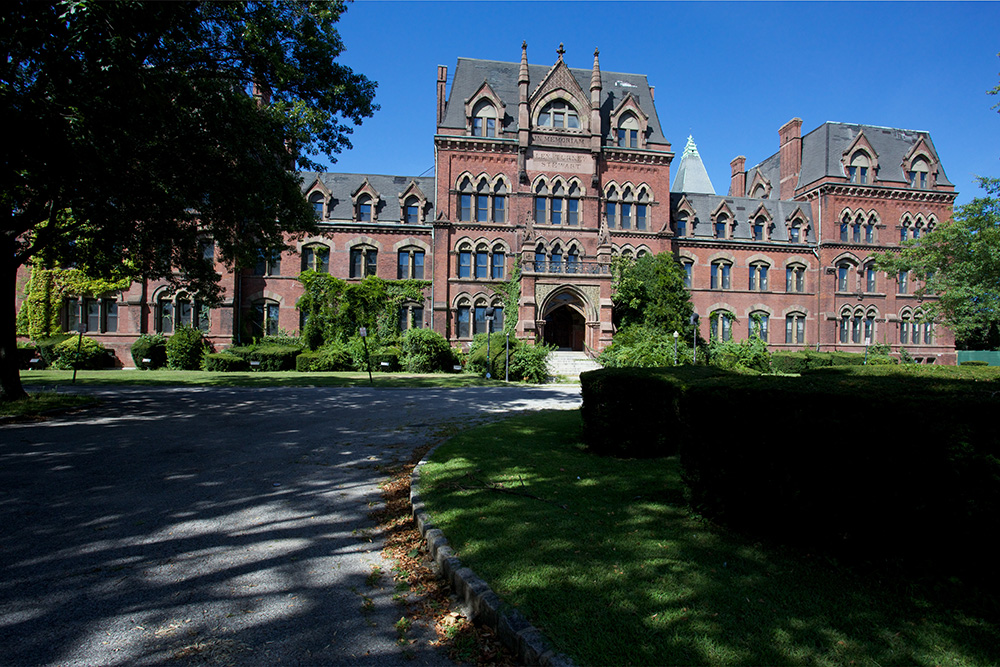
- The front of the St. Paul's Episcopal School for Boys, from the street

- Location within New York Location within the United States
- Location: 289 (or 288) Stewart Avenue, Garden City, New York, 11530
- Coordinates: 40°43′31.69″N 73°38′51.18″W
- Area: 53 acres (21 ha)
- Built: 1871
- Architect: John Kellum; Henry G. Harrison
- Architectural style: Italianate, Italianate vernacular
- Part of: A. T. Stewart Era Buildings
- NRHP reference No.: 78001864
- Added to NRHP: November 14, 1978

St. Paul's School is a landmarked, 500-room brick edifice located within the Village of Garden City, in Nassau County, New York, United States. As of 2010, the building is not used.

== History ==
St. Paul's was built by Cornelia Stewart, widow of Alexander Stewart, and dedicated in his honor. This building is of High Victorian Gothic design. The architect was William H. Harris. The cornerstone was laid on June 18, 1879, with attended by Cornelia Stewart, her brother Charles Clinch, Henry Hilton, and Abram Newkirk Littlejohn, the first Episcopal Bishop of Long Island. It took James L'Hommedieu four years to complete construction of this massive E-shaped building. It was crowned with a slate roof and a clock and bell tower. There were laboratories, classrooms, libraries, several dining halls, kitchens, a large reception parlor, permanent workspaces for staff, a beautiful gothic chapel, with seating for 400, dormitory space for 300 students, with spacious interior apartments on the top floors for teachers.

It opened in 1883 as a military school for boys, owned by the Episcopal Diocese of Long Island. In 1884, the St. Paul's football team won the New York area championship. The school also had baseball and ice hockey teams. St. Paul's remained a military school for only 10 years, afterward becoming a college preparatory academy.

At the turn of the 20th century, headmaster Rev. Frederick Luther Gamage stated the school's mission to be to "develop manly, Christian character, a strong physique, and the power to think." During Father Gamage's tenure, a benefactor, George Bywater Cluett, an owner of the Cluett, Peabody and Company, a collar and shirt making firm in Troy, New York, provided funds for a gymnasium to be constructed as a memorial to Cluett's son, Alfonzo Rockwell Cluett, who had been a student of Headmaster Gamage, approximately class of 1896, and after graduating from Yale University in 1900, died the following Christmas Eve of typhoid fever.

Approximately 1906, William Bradford Turner, a direct descendant of Massachuttes Bay Colony Governor William Bradford, enrolled at St. Paul's in the third form (i.e. ninth grade); Turner would later go on to posthumously win the Congressional Medal of Honor, being killed in World War I.

In 1907, Headmaster Gamage left St. Paul's, and some of its prestigious students, like Turner, and donors, like Cluett, went with him to found Trinity-Pawling School upstate. However, the school continued to prosper.

After the World Series finished in 1917, the pennant winning teams, the Chicago White Sox and New York Giants, came to St. Paul's to play an exhibition baseball game to entertain the soldiers of the United States Army Rainbow Division, which was encamped nearby in Garden City. Participants in that game for the New York Giants included Manager John McGraw, and Jim Thorpe. The White Sox players included those soon to be infamous in the Black Sox Scandal.

The brother of United States President Donald Trump, Fred Trump Jr., graduated from St. Paul's in 1956. Their father, Fred Sr., donated money to improve the soccer field, which was temporarily renamed Trump Field.

In 1970, a new gymnasium field house was built, and named for Father Nicholas Feringa, the former headmaster. At the opening, it was the largest indoor sports fieldhouse on Long Island, with four contiguous basketball courts. The New York Nets professional basketball team used it as their training facility, splitting the basketball complex with the students. Future Hall of Famer Rick Barry was on the Nets at that time, with the Nets using the same gym and the same locker rooms concurrently with the St. Paul's students.

In 1991, St. Paul's owner, the Episcopal Diocese of Long Island, entered bankruptcy, and being forced to sell its assets, St. Paul's shut down. The Village of Garden City negotiated a "friendly condemnation", and obtained the buildings and all 48 acres of land. The village has used the gymnasiums and athletic fields, but basic maintenance has been neglected.

The AIA Architectural Guide to Nassau and Suffolk Counties describes the building as having "poly-chromatic voussoir arched windows, elaborate cast-iron balustrades, and Dorchester stone trim." The building was selected in 2003 by the Preservation League of New York State as one of its "Seven to Save" endangered properties.

Saint Paul's featured prominently in the book published by then-President Donald Trump's niece, Mary L. Trump, Too Much and Never Enough, in which she explains that both of President Trump's brothers – her own father, Fred Trump Jr., and her uncle, Robert Trump – were alumni of Saint Paul's. The book goes on to describe pranks by Freddie Trump's friends including one by Homer Godwin.

== Development and demolition ==
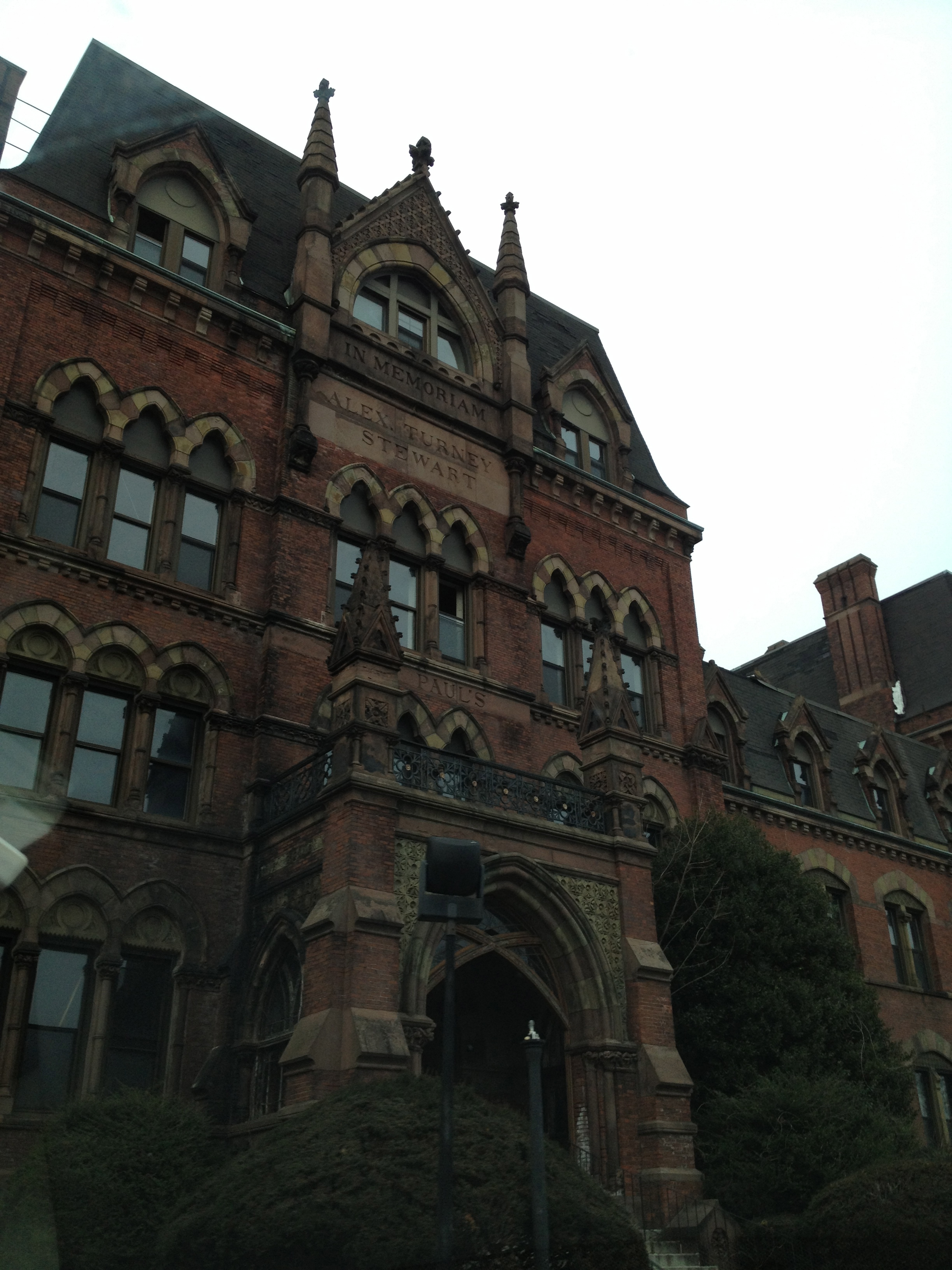
Main entrance to St. Paul's School.

In 1993, the building was sold to the Incorporated Village of Garden City. The residents of Garden City were unable to come up with a viable plan to use the school for a different purpose. The Mayor of Garden City appointed a committee to make recommend uses for the buildings which recommended that the property be redeveloped, and leased for 99 years to a private senior assisted living company. The proposal was controversial because there was no municipal use of the buildings and because the proposal increased the building footprint and decreased green space, as well as lack of significant tax revenues.

In 1995, Tishman Speyer Properties conducted a preliminary inspection and evaluation on the potential to adapt the St. Paul's buildings as the new Garden City High School. Tishman Speyer submitted four preliminary designs to the Garden City Board of Education for their consideration. The proposal was supported by many of the younger families; however, the Eastern Property Owners Association vigorously lobbied the Board of Education not to consider it out of fear it would cost more, and the Board of Education eventually took it off the table. Ironically, the alternative cost of renovating the Garden City Middle and High School subsequently proved to be even more.

In 2004, the Village Board of the Incorporated Village of Garden City voted to dedicate St. Paul's School's 48 acre (194,000 m^{2}) site as parkland, with then Mayor Barbara Miller voting twice to break the tie of 4 board members in favor and 4 members opposed, on December 16. Removal of its designation as parkland would require the approval of the New York State Legislature.

In 2008, a Village-wide opinion poll was held, and the results were: Approve Demolition: 2,272 votes (45.4%); Approve Mothballing of Main Building: 1,857 votes (37.1%); Approve of the Avalon Bay proposal: 873 votes (17.5%). The total Voter Turnout was 5,002.

In 2014, an annex known as Ellis Hall, built in 1969 to provide additional school space, was demolished, although preservation plans included saving the annex.

== See also ==
- A. T. Stewart Era Buildings
- Cathedral of the Incarnation
