= Rodney R. Michel =

American Anglican bishop

The Right Reverend Rodney R. Michel
- Suffragan Bishop of Long Island
- Church: Episcopal Church
- Diocese: Long Island
- Elected: November 2, 1996
- In office: 1997–2007

Orders
- Ordination: December 1, 1970 by Russell T. Rauscher
- Consecration: April 12, 1997 by Edmond L. Browning

Personal details
- Born: February 7, 1943 (age 83) Petersburg, Nebraska, United States
- Denomination: Anglican
- Spouse: Marie
- Children: 4

Rodney Rae Michel (born February 7, 1943) is a retired American bishop. He served as Suffragan Bishop of Long Island (1997–2007), Assisting Bishop of Georgia (2007–2008) and Assisting Bishop of Pennsylvania (2009–2012) in the Episcopal Church of the United States.

== Life career ==
Michel was born on February 7, 1943, in Petersburg, Nebraska. He graduated from the University of Nebraska and Seabury-Western Theological Seminary. He was ordained deacon on June 21, 1970, at St. Mark's-on-the-campus in Lincoln, Nebraska, and priest on December 1, 1970, at St. Mark's Church in Gordon, Nebraska. He then became vicar of the Church of St. Mark in Gordon, Nebraska, St Paul's Church in Merriman, Nebraska and St Mary's Church in Rushville, Nebraska. In 1972 he became rector of St Andrew's Church in Scottsbluff, Nebraska while in 1983 he became rector of St Paul's Church in Grand Forks, North Dakota. In 1987 he went to Long Island and became canon pastor at the Cathedral of the Incarnation in Garden City, New York, a post he held till 1991. He then became rector of St. Peter's Church in Bay Shore, New York.

He was elected Suffragan Bishop of Long Island on November 2, 1996. He was consecrated on April 12, 1997, by Presiding Bishop Edmond L. Browning, Orris George Walker (Bishop of Long Island), and Robert C. Witcher (former Bishop of Long Island). He retired in 2007 and served as Assistant Bishop in Georgia, Maryland and Pennsylvania.

Michel is episcopal visitor of the Brotherhood of St. Gregory and episcopal guardian of the Shrine of Our Lady of Clemency in Philadelphia. He was a member of the Board of Managers of the Bible and Common Prayer Book Society.

== See also ==
- List of bishops of the Episcopal Church in the United States of America
