= William Melish =

William Melish may refer to:

- William Howard Melish, American Episcopalian and social leader
- William Bromwell Melish, president of Bromwell Brush and Wire Goods in Cincinnati
