= Charles W. MacLean =

The Right Reverend Charles Waldo MacLean S.T.D., D.D.
- Suffragan Bishop of Long Island
- Church: Episcopal Church
- Diocese: Long Island
- Elected: 1961
- In office: 1962–1975

Orders
- Ordination: February 1929 by John T. Dallas
- Consecration: February 14, 1962 by James P. deWolfe

Personal details
- Born: June 28, 1903 Lincoln, New Hampshire, United States
- Died: March 22, 1985 (aged 81) Mineola, New York, United States
- Buried: St. Mary's Church in Shelter Island, New York
- Denomination: Anglican
- Parents: Howard Douglas MacLean & Ethel May Holmes
- Spouse: Grace Elizabeth Mentzer (m. May 31, 1928); Paula Featheringill
- Children: 2

Charles Waldo MacLean (June 28, 1903 - March 22, 1985) was a suffragan bishop of the Episcopal Diocese of Long Island in New York.

== Biography ==
MacLean was born on June 28, 1903, in Lincoln, New Hampshire, the son of Howard Douglas MacLean and Ethel Holmes MacLean. He graduated from St Stephen's College in Annandale-on-Hudson, New York, in 1925 and then from the General Theological Seminary in New York City in 1928. He was made deacon in May 1928 and ordained priest in February 1929. He served as curate of the Church of the Epiphany in New York City between 1928 and 1930, after which he became vicar of St John's Chapel in Richmond Hill, Queens. In 1933 he became rector of Grace Church in Riverhead, New York. In 1950 he was appointed archdeacon in charge of diocesan administration. He was also created as an honorary canon at the Cathedral of Incarnation in Garden City, New York, in 1947.

In 1961 he was elected Suffragan Bishop of Long Island and was consecrated on February 14, 1962. He served until retirement in 1975. He died on March 22, 1985, in NYU Winthrop Hospital after a brief illness. Bishop Charles Waldo MacLean Episcopal Nursing Home in Queens, New York, is named in his memory.
