= Melish =

Melish is a surname. Notable people with the surname include:

- John Melish (1771–1822), Scottish mapmaker
- Thomas G. Melish (1876–1948), American entrepreneur and coin collector
- William Bromwell Melish (1852–1927), American businessman and Freemason leader
- William Howard Melish (1910–1986), American Episcopalian and social leader
