= Adam Shoemaker (priest) =

Adam J. Shoemaker, born Adam Haggagi, is an Egyptian American Episcopal clergyman who has served as the 9th Bishop of Long Island since 2026.

== Family and education ==
Shoemaker was born Adam Haggagi in Manhattan to a Muslim father and Jewish mother; after his parents divorced, his mother married a man whose last name (Shoemaker) he assumed, while his father returned to Egypt, where he remarried and had six more children. He was raised in Huntington, New York, and attended churches in Huntington and in Northport. He was educated at Saint Anthony High School in South Huntington, graduating in 1997. He then studied at Boston University, Harvard Divinity School and General Theological Seminary, and earned a Doctor of Ministry degree from Duke Divinity School, focusing on the effects of gentrification on congregations.

== Career ==
In 2005 and 2006 Shoemaker served as a missionary in the Diocese of Rio de Janeiro in the Anglican Episcopal Church of Brazil, where his work included teaching English at Christ the King church in the City of God favela. After returning to the United States, he was ordained as a deacon in 2007 and a priest in 2008. From 2007 to 2011 he was the assistant rector at Christ Church in Andover, Massachusetts, before becoming rector of the Church of the Holy Comforter in Burlington, North Carolina. Since 2017 he has served as rector of St. Stephen's church in Charleston, South Carolina.

On April 18, 2026, Shoemaker was elected to serve as the 9th Bishop of Long Island, succeeding Lawrence C. Provenzano. His consecration took place at the Tilles Center in Brookville, New York, on September 19.

== Personal life ==
Shoemaker is married to the Rev. Courtney Davis-Shoemaker, rector of St. Peter's church in Charleston, whom he met at General Theological Seminary. They have three children.

In addition to English, Shoemaker speaks Portuguese and is conversant in Arabic and Spanish.
