= John Insley Blair Larned =

The Right Reverend John Insley Blair Larned D.D., LL.D.
- Suffragan Bishop of Long Island
- Church: Episcopal Church
- Diocese: Long Island
- Elected: November 14, 1928
- In office: 1929–1946
- Other post: Bishop of the American Episcopal churches in Europe (1947-1953)

Orders
- Ordination: June 1912 by David H. Greer
- Consecration: February 11, 1929 by John Gardner Murray

Personal details
- Born: October 5, 1883 Chicago, Illinois, U.S.
- Died: December 3, 1955 (aged 72) Boston, Massachusetts, U.S.
- Denomination: Anglican
- Parents: Walter Cranston Larned & Emma Locke Scribner
- Spouse: Elizabeth Virginia Jenkins; Mabel Burrage Bremer
- Children: 3

John Insley Blair Larned (October 5, 1883 – December 3, 1955) was a suffragan bishop of the Episcopal Diocese of Long Island, serving from 1929 to 1946.

== Early life and education ==
Larned was born on October 3, 1883, in Chicago, Illinois, the son of Walter Cranston Larned and Emma Locke Scribner.

He was educated at the Lake Forest Academy in Lake Forest, Illinois, and The Hill School in Pottstown, Pennsylvania.

In 1905, he graduated with a Bachelor of Arts from Harvard College. He graduated with a post-graduate degree from the Massachusetts Institute of Technology in 1908. He then studied at the Episcopal Theological School in Cambridge, Massachusetts, where he graduated with a Bachelor of Divinity in 1911.

He was awarded an honorary Doctor of Divinity from Trinity College in Hartford, Connecticut, in 1935, and a Doctor of Laws from Hobart College in Geneva, New York, in 1946.

== Career ==
=== Ordained ministry ===
Larned was ordained a deacon in 1911 and a priest in 1912. He then served as curate at Saint John's Church in Staten Island, New York City, between 1911 and 1913 before becoming rector of Saint John's Church in Globe, Arizona. In 1916 he moved to Kingston, New York, to become rector of Saint John's Church. Between 1918 and 1922 he served as Dean of the Pro-Cathedral of the Nativity in Bethlehem, Pennsylvania.

He later became rector of Saint John's Church in Yonkers, New York, and then in 1925 left to become general secretary in the field department of the National Council of the Episcopal Church, where he remained till 1929.

=== Episcopacy ===
Larned was elected Suffragan Bishop of Long Island on November 14, 1928, in the Cathedral of the Incarnation in Garden City, New York. He was consecrated on February 11, 1929, with Presiding Bishop John Gardner Murray as chief consecrator. He was named for American industrialist John Insley Blair. He was also Bishop-in-charge of American Episcopal Churches in Europe between 1947 and 1953.

== Death ==
Larned died in Massachusetts General Hospital in Boston, on December 3, 1955.
