= A. T. Stewart Era Buildings =

- U.S. National Register of Historic Places
- U.S. Historic district
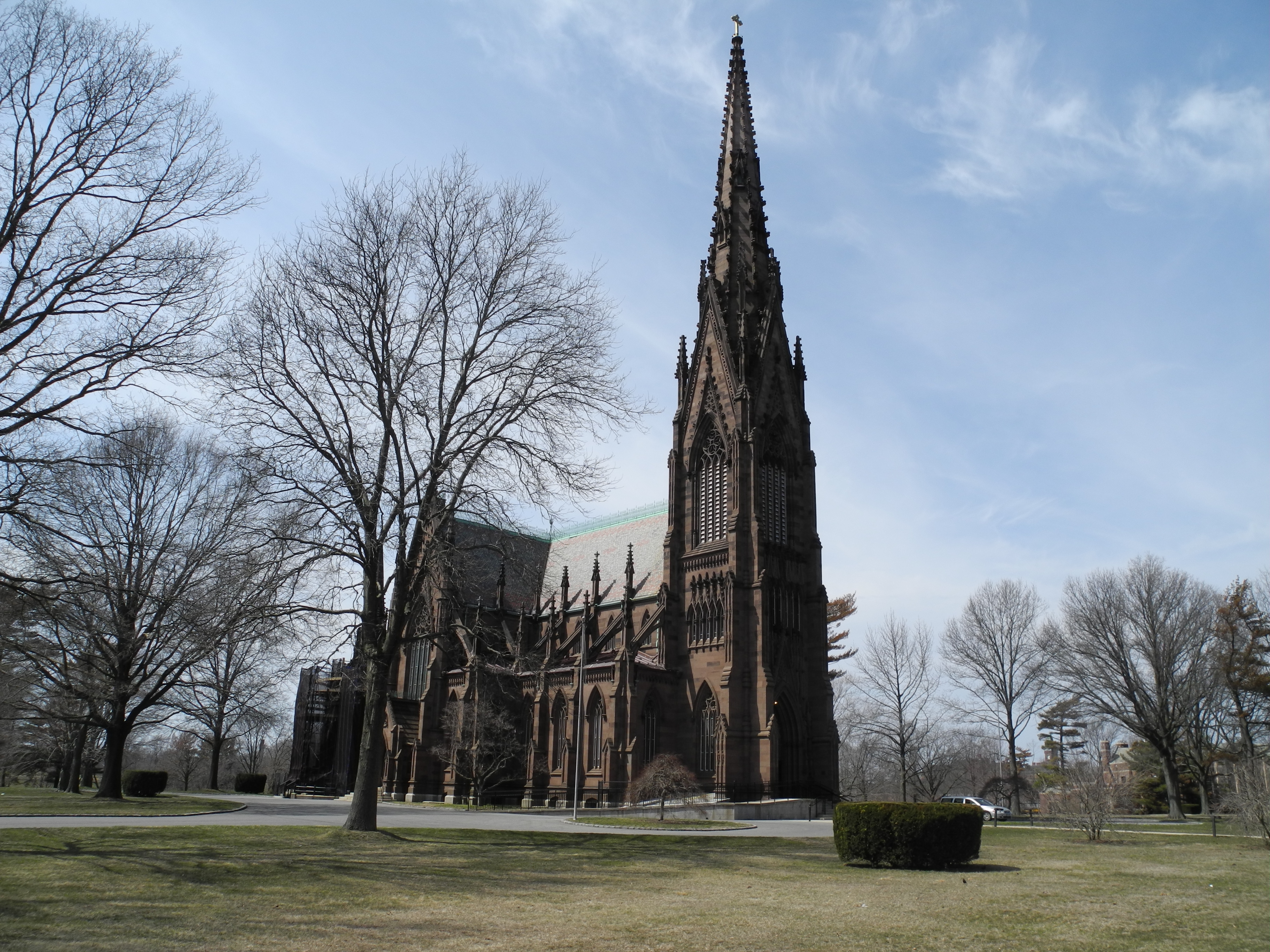
- Cathedral of the Incarnation, April 2013

- Location within New York Location within the United States Location within the United States Location within the United States
- Location: 4th, 5th, and 6th Sts., Cathedral and Cherry Valley Aves., Garden City, New York
- Coordinates: 40°43′21″N 73°38′27″W
- Area: 53 acres (21 ha)
- Built: 1871
- Architect: Kellum, John; Harrison, Henry G.
- Architectural style: Italianate, Italianate vernacular
- NRHP reference No.: 78001864
- Added to NRHP: November 14, 1978

A. T. Stewart Era Buildings is a national historic district located at Garden City in Nassau County, New York. It consists of a thematic group of 50 residential, commercial, religious, and civic structures built as original elements of the planned community of Garden City between 1871 and 1893. They were built as part of the plan for Garden City devised originally by Alexander Turney Stewart (1801–1876). Included are 44 residences built between 1871 and 1878 and range in scale from modest cottages to large, rambling, three story frame "villas." Other buildings are: 53-55 Hilton Avenue commercial block (1875), Garden City Water Works (1876), Cathedral of the Incarnation Complex (1885), St. Paul's School (1883), Cathedral School of St. Mary (1893)

It was listed on the National Register of Historic Places in 1978.

== Apostle Houses ==
The Apostle houses are unique to Garden City. There were originally ten. These homes were part of Alexander Stewart's dream of a planned community with wide avenues and hundreds of trees and shrubs. Most of the Apostle houses that still stand today are residences, except one which houses the Garden City Historical Society. All are listed on the National Register of Historic Places as part of the A.T. Stewart Era Historic District.

The houses are designed with mansard roofs and cupolas. Typically there are sixteen rooms: six bedrooms, five baths and two half baths. The houses also have servant's quarters. Characteristically, there are twelve foot ceilings and beautiful moldings.

Three homes have been torn down and one home has burned down since the original construction in the 19th century. Out of ten original homes only six remain.

=== Original locations ===
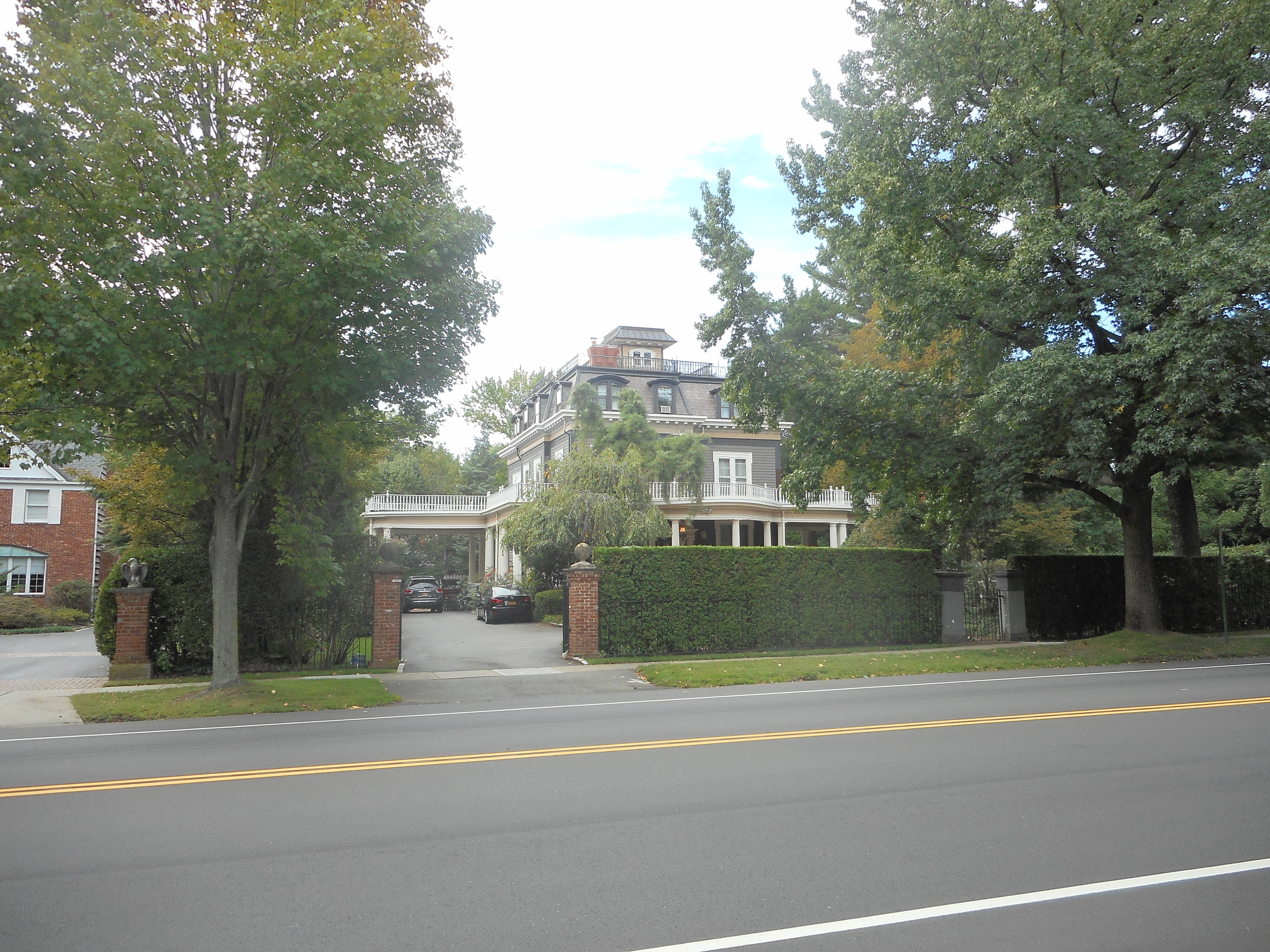
40 Hilton Avenue, one of the original "Apostle Houses" within the district

1. Hilton Ave. and Stewart Ave.
2. Hilton Ave. and Seventh St.
3. Hilton Ave. and Fifth St.
4. Hilton Ave. and Fifth St.
5. Cathedral Ave. and Fourth St.
6. Cathedral Ave. and Fifth St.
7. Cathedral Ave. and Fifth St.
8. Rockaway Ave. and Fourth St.
9. Rockaway Ave. and Third St.
10. Rockaway Ave. and Second St.

=== Current locations and changes ===
Three of the four houses built on Hilton Ave have been torn down. The fourth Hilton Ave house, located on 40 Hilton Ave, had a kitchen extension in the 1920s.

The sixth home, originally on located Cathedral Ave and Fifth St, burned down.

The seventh home, originally on located Cathedral Ave and Fifth St was moved twice and is now located on Eleventh Street. Originally, the house was owned by the Episcopal Cathedral of the Incarnation, Garden City, and used as the grammar school for the Cathedral School of St Mary's. It was known as "Little St. Mary's. The Cathedral of the Incarnation went bankrupt and closed both St Mary's School and St Paul's School. This house was given to the Historical Society and moved to its current location on Eleventh Street.

The tenth Apostle house, located at 15 Rockaway Avenue and Second Street, had many renovations and additions which include: central air, remodeled kitchen and basement.
