= Jonathan G. Sherman =

Bishop

The Right Reverend Jonathan G. Sherman
- Bishop of Long Island
- Church: Episcopal Church
- Diocese: Long Island
- Elected: March 19, 1966
- In office: 1966–1977
- Predecessor: James P. deWolfe
- Successor: Robert C. Witcher
- Previous post: Suffragan Bishop of Long Island (1949-1966)

Orders
- Ordination: June 1934 by Frederick G. Budlong
- Consecration: January 6, 1949 by Henry Knox Sherrill

Personal details
- Born: June 13, 1907 St. Louis, Missouri, United States
- Died: October 27, 1989 (aged 82) Hartford, Connecticut, United States
- Denomination: Anglican
- Parents: Stephen Fish Sherman, Marion Louise Goodhue
- Spouse: Frances LeBaron Casady
- Children: 3

Jonathan Goodhue Sherman (June 13, 1907 – October 27, 1989) was bishop of the Episcopal Diocese of Long Island from 1966 to 1977, having served previously as suffragan from 1949 to 1965.

== Biography ==
Sherman was born on June 13, 1907, in St. Louis, Missouri, the son of the Reverend Stephen Fish Sherman and Marion Louise Goodhue. He was educated at Kent School in Kent, Connecticut, and the later studied at Yale University from where he graduated with a Bachelor of Arts in 1929. He also studied at the General Theological Seminary, where he earned his Bachelor of Sacred Theology in 1933.

He was made deacon in June 1933 by Edward Campion Acheson, Bishop of Connecticut and ordained priest in June 1934 by the then Bishop of Connecticut Frederick G. Budlong in St John's Church in Bridgeport, Connecticut. He worked as a fellow and tutor at the General Theological Seminary between 1933 and 1935 before becoming priest-in-charge of the Church of St Thomas in Farmingdale, New York. In 1938 he became rector of St Thomas' Church in Bellerose, New York, and remained there till 1949.

In 1937, Sherman married Frances LeBaron Christabel Casady of the influential Casady family of Des Moines. Frances was the daughter of the Episcopal Bishop Thomas Casady.

On October 12, 1948, during the reconvened session of the 81st Convention of the Diocese of Long Island in the Cathedral of the Incarnation, Sherman was elected as the Suffragan Bishop of Long Island. He was consecrated on January 6, 1949, in the Cathedral of the Incarnation by Presiding Bishop Henry Knox Sherrill. He served as suffragan until his election as the fifth Bishop of Long Island on March 19, 1966, and was installed in the diocesan cathedral on June 18, 1966. His election was seen as supporting the high church or Anglo-Catholic wing of the denomination. He retired on his 70th birthday on June 13, 1977. He died due to heart failure on October 27, 1989, in Saint Francis Hospital & Medical Center.
