= Robert C. Witcher =

American bishop (1926–2021)

The Right Reverend Robert Campbell Witcher D.D., Ph.D.
- Bishop of Long Island
- Church: Episcopal Church
- Diocese: Long Island
- In office: 1977–1991
- Predecessor: Jonathan G. Sherman
- Successor: Orris George Walker
- Previous post: Coadjutor Bishop of Long Island (1975-1977)

Orders
- Ordination: June 11, 1953 by Iveson B. Noland
- Consecration: April 7, 1975 by John Allin

Personal details
- Born: October 5, 1926 New Orleans, Louisiana, United States
- Died: June 14, 2021 (aged 94)
- Denomination: Anglican
- Parents: Charles Swanson Witcher & Lily Sebastian Campbell
- Spouse: Elisabeth Alice Cole
- Children: 2

Robert Campbell Witcher Sr. (October 5, 1926 – June 14, 2021) was the sixth bishop of the Episcopal Diocese of Long Island, serving from 1977 to 1991.

== Background and Education ==
Witcher was born on October 5, 1926, in New Orleans, Louisiana, the son of Charles Swanson Witcher and Lily Sebastian Campbell. He graduated with a Bachelor of Arts from Tulane University in 1949 and with a Master of Divinity from Seabury-Western Theological Seminary in 1952. He was awarded a Doctor of Divinity from Seabury-Western Theological Seminary in 1974, a Master of Arts in 1960 and a Doctor of Philosophy in 1968, both from Louisiana State University.

== Ordained ministry ==
Witcher was ordained deacon on July 6, 1952, in Christ Church Cathedral (New Orleans) by Bishop Girault M. Jones. He was ordained priest on June 11, 1953, by the Suffragan Bishop of Louisiana Iveson B. Noland in St James' Church, Baton Rouge, Louisiana. Between 1953 and 1956 he served as priest-in-charge, of St Andrew's Church in Linton, Louisiana, St Patrick's Church in Zachary, Louisiana, and St Andrew's Church also in Zachary, Louisiana. For a shorter period, between 1953 and 1954 he was also priest-in-charge of St Augustine's Church in Baton Rouge, Louisiana. In 1954 he became rector of St Augustine's Church, Baton Rouge, Louisiana. He was made canon pastor at Christ Church Cathedral in New Orleans in 1961 and in 1962 became rector of St James' Church, Baton Rouge, Louisiana, where he remained till 1975.

== Episcopacy ==
He was elected Coadjutor Bishop of Long Island in 1975 and was consecrated on April 7, 1975, by Presiding Bishop John Allin in the Cathedral of the Incarnation. He succeeded as diocesan in 1977. As Bishop of Long Island, Witcher was known for his conservative views concerning the ordination of women. During his tenure as bishop, the Diocese of Long Island was one of the few dioceses which by 1988, had not ordained women to the priesthood. Hence, in 1988, a Coadjutor was elected, Orris George Walker, to take responsibility of ordinations and consequently ordain women to the priesthood. He was also professor of church history at The Mercer School of Theology between 1975 and 1991 and interim bishop of the Armed Forces between 1989 and 1990. He resigned his post on January 1, 1991, and became bishop-in-residence in Baton Rouge, Louisiana. Witcher died on June 14, 2021.
