= Ernest M. Stires =

American bishop

The Right Reverend Ernest M. Stires
- Bishop of Long Island
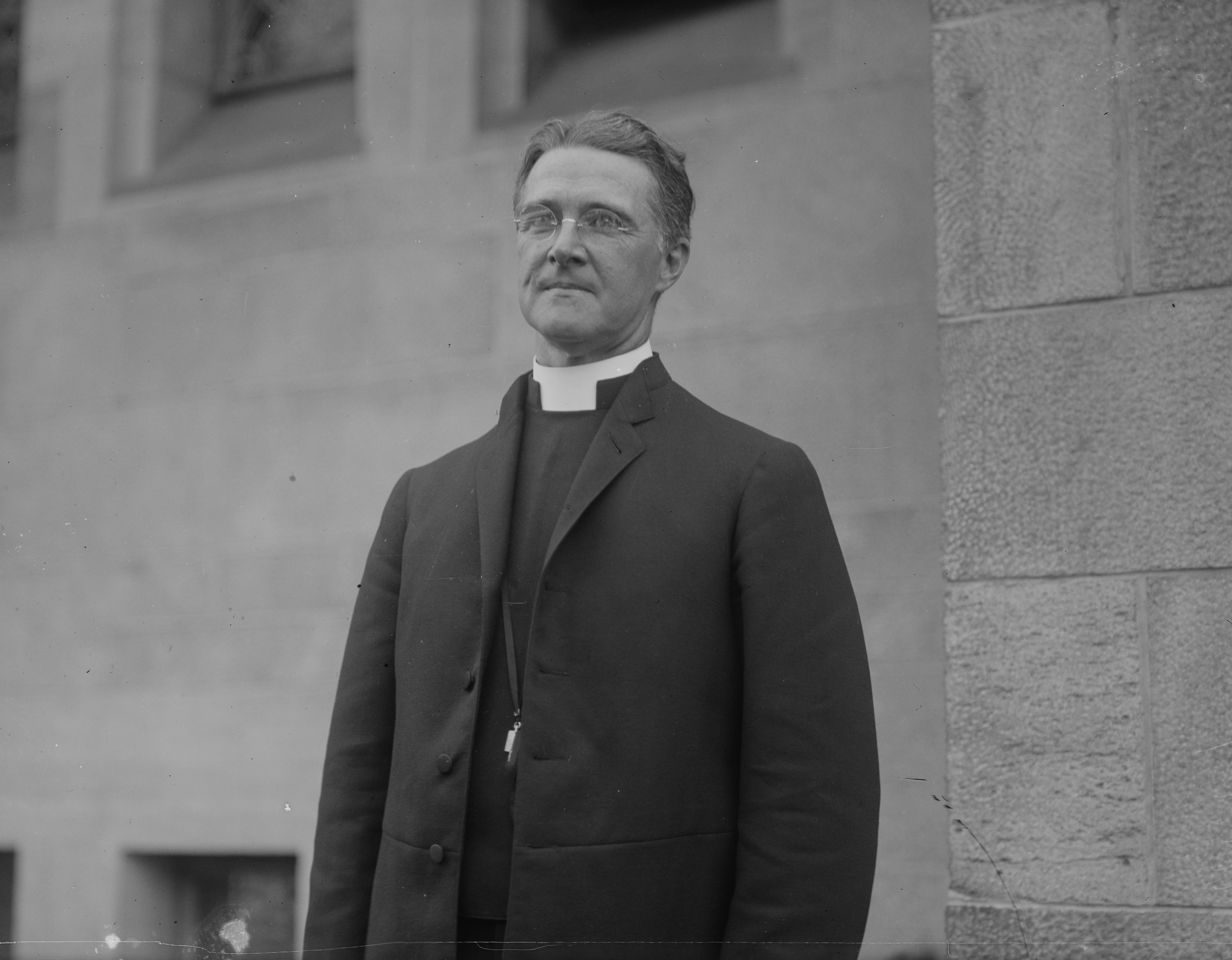
- Shown in 1919
- Church: Episcopal Church
- Province: Province 2
- Diocese: Long Island
- Elected: May 26, 1925
- In office: 1925–1942
- Predecessor: Frederick Burgess
- Successor: James P. deWolfe

Orders
- Ordination: June 24, 1892 by Alfred Magill Randolph
- Consecration: November 24, 1925 by Ethelbert Talbot

Personal details
- Born: May 20, 1866 Norfolk, Virginia, U.S.
- Died: February 12, 1951 (aged 84) Palm Beach, Florida, U.S.
- Buried: Kensico Cemetery
- Denomination: Anglican
- Spouse: Sarah McKinne Hardwick
- Children: 4
- Education: Episcopal High School; Virginia Theological Seminary; University of Virginia

Ernest Milmore Stires (May 20, 1866 - February 12, 1951) was the third Bishop of Long Island in the Episcopal Church from 1925 to 1942.

== Early life and education ==
Stires was born in Norfolk, Virginia on May 20, 1866, son of Van Rensselaer West Stires and Lettie M. Milmore. He was a graduate of the Episcopal High School in Alexandria, Virginia, Virginia Theological Seminary, and the University of Virginia where he was a member of Phi Kappa Psi and the Virginia Glee Club. Stires later served as Phi Kappa Psi's seventh national President. He graduated with a Bachelor of Letters from the University of Virginia in 1888. He was awarded a Doctor of Divinity from Virginia Theological Seminary in 1901, Doctor of Humane Letters from Kenyon College in 1903, Doctor of Laws from New York University, Doctor of Civil Law from University of King's College and Doctor of Sacred Theology from Columbia University, all in 1926.

== Ordained ministry ==
He was ordained deacon on June 26, 1891, by the Bishop of Virginia Francis McNeece Whittle, and then served as rector of St John's Church in West Point, Virginia. He was ordained priest on June 24, 1892, by the Bishop of Southern Virginia Alfred Magill Randolph, and briefly served in the Church of the Good Shepherd in Augusta, Georgia before moving to Chicago to serve as curate and then rector of Grace Church in 1893. On November 1, 1901, he became rector of St Thomas's Church in New York City where he served until 1925 with a brief absence for when he served in France in the First World War. He served as deputy to the General Convention from 1910 to 1925 and was a member of National Council.

== Episcopacy ==
Stires was elected Coadjutor Bishop of Long Island in May 1925. However, by the time of his consecration, the incumbent diocesan bishop, Frederick Burgess, had died, and hence Stires was consecrated as the third Bishop of Long Island on November 24, 1925, by Presiding Bishop Ethelbert Talbot.
