= James P. deWolfe =

American Episcopal bishop

The Right Reverend James Pernette deWolfe D.D.
- Bishop of Long Island
- Church: Episcopal Church
- Diocese: Long Island
- Elected: February 10, 1942
- In office: 1942–1966
- Predecessor: Ernest M. Stires
- Successor: Jonathan G. Sherman

Orders
- Ordination: December 21, 1919 by James H. Wise
- Consecration: May 1, 1942 by Henry St. George Tucker

Personal details
- Born: April 7, 1896 Kansas City, Kansas, U.S.
- Died: February 6, 1966 (aged 69) New York, New York, U.S.
- Denomination: Anglican
- Spouse: Elizabeth Spitler Owen (m. 1916; died 1963)
- Children: 3
- Education: Kenyon College; Bexley Hall

James Pernette deWolfe (April 7, 1896 – February 6, 1966) was the fourth bishop of the Episcopal Diocese of Long Island.

== Early life ==
He was born in Kansas City, Kansas to parents Edward DeWolfe and Caroline Evangeline (Gilges). He attended St. Paul’s church and sang in the choir. As a child he showed a gift for music.

deWolfe attended Kenyon College where he was a founding member of Lambda chapter of Sigma Pi fraternity and its first president. While at Kenyon, he was the choir master for the college choir. He graduated in 1917 and started attending the seminary at Bexley Hall. While attending Bexley Hall, he volunteered his time to Sigma Pi as chairman of the national fraternity’s first song committee. This committee compiled and published the first edition of Songs of Sigma Pi. In 1916, he married Elizabeth Spitler Owen of Mt. Vernon, Ohio. They would go on to have three children: James Jr. (1918–2009), Philip, and Elizabeth.

== Early ministry ==
Rev. deWolfe was ordained on December 21, 1919. His first ministry was at St. Peter’s church in Pittsburg, Kansas. During his time in Pittsburgh, he also served as chaplain for Camp Tuttle which was a summer camp run by the Brotherhood of St. Andrew. In 1922 he was moved to St. Andrew’s Church in Kansas City, Missouri. In 1934 he was moved to Christ Church Cathedral in Houston, Texas where he rebuilt the church’s edifice. While in Houston he started a nursery, a social settlement for young people, a clinic for mothers, a family service bureau, and a home for elderly women. He was also the director of the local symphony orchestra. From 1940 to 1942 he was the Dean of the Cathedral of St. John the Divine in New York City.

== Bishop ==
In 1942 deWolfe was named Bishop of the Diocese of Long Island. One of his assignments in his first year as bishop was to ordain his son, James P. deWolfe Jr., as a priest on May 22, 1943.

As bishop some of his accomplishments were the establishment of a diocesan youth center at Wading River, missionary work among Hispanics and the Brooklyn waterfront, the reorganization of St. John’s Hospital, the organization of a second diocesan hospital in Smithtown, the founding of the school of Theology at Garden City, and added buildings to the cathedral’s schools of St. Paul and St. Mary. He also headed the Joint Commission of Church Music for the Episcopal Church’s General Convention. The youth center at Wading River would later be named Camp deWolfe in his honor.

In February 1955, he initiated a new form for alternative theological training by establishing the School of Theology of the Diocese of Long Island. It was a program designed for training older men for the ministry. The school met regularly at St. Paul's Boys School and in the Cathedral House in Garden City, New York. When this project ended, it was succeeded by the George Mercer, Jr., Memorial School of Theology. It was incorporated in Feb. 1961. The School offers courses in Christian education, preparation for licensed lay ministries, and a curriculum for persons preparing for ordained ministry. Classes at Mercer are held at times which are convenient for persons who are employed on a full-time basis. It is not a seminary accredited by the Association of Theological Schools (ATS).

In 1957 he closed Holy Trinity Episcopal Church in Downtown Brooklyn after ten years of an intra-parish feud. The feud focused on the belief that the church’s rector, Rev. John Howard Melish, was a communist sympathizer. This belief was caused by his support of his son, Rev. William Howard Melish’s work with the National Council of American-Soviet Friendship. Bishop deWolfe closed the church when the parish could not work out its problems itself. The church remained closed for twelve years before being reopened as St. Ann and the Holy Trinity Episcopal Church.

In 1958 he attended the Lambeth Conference in London.

In 1962, he was criticized for the segregationist policies of St. John's Episcopal Hospital in Brooklyn where he was president of the board of managers. After a demonstration outside the hospital he directed the hospital to amend its policies.

Rev. deWolfe received honorary doctorate degrees from Kenyon College, Columbia University, and Adelphi University.

He remained bishop until he died in 1966.

== Written work ==
Rev. deWolfe wrote at least five books and pamphlets:

- A Marriage Manual for The Administration of the Marriage and Family Canons for The Protestant Episcopal Church in the U.S.A. in 1947
- Answers To Laymen's Questions
- Premarital Instructions, reprinted from A Marriage Manual in 1947
- The Church and the Family in 1947
- Devotions Before, During and After The Holy Eucharist
