= St. Ann & the Holy Trinity Church =

Church in Brooklyn, New York

- Holy Trinity Church (Protestant Episcopal)
- U.S. National Register of Historic Places
- U.S. National Historic Landmark
- U.S. National Historic Landmark District – Contributing property
- New York State Register of Historic Places
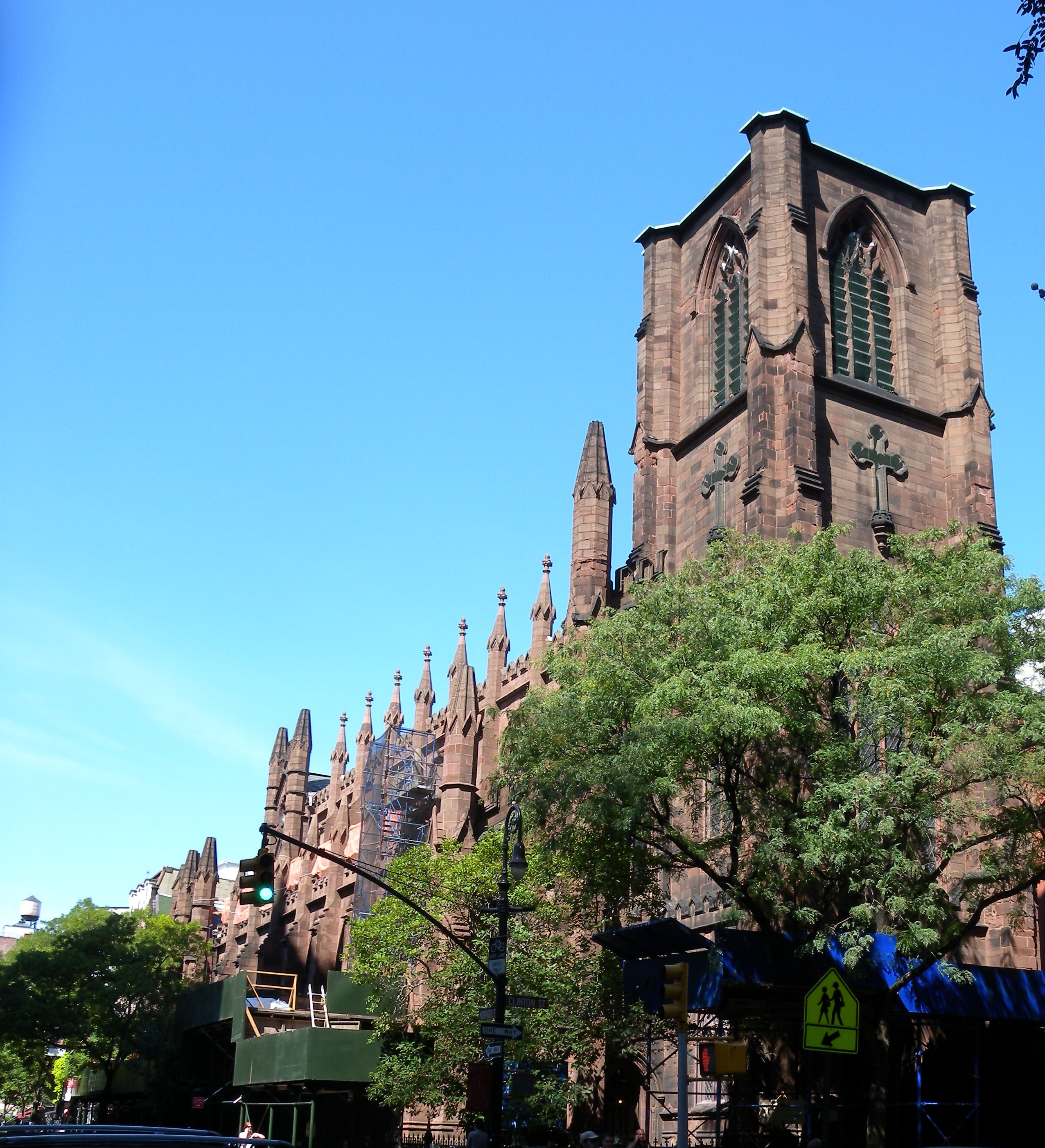
- Truncated steeple

- Location within New York City Location within New York Location within the United States
- Interactive map of Holy Trinity Church (Protestant Episcopal)
- Location: 157 Montague St., Brooklyn, New York, US
- Coordinates: 40°41′40.5″N 73°59′34.71″W
- Built: 1844-1847
- Architect: Minard LaFever
- Architectural style: Gothic Revival
- Part of: Brooklyn Heights Historic District (ID66000524)
- NRHP reference No.: 87002590
- NYSRHP No.: 04701.001615

Significant dates
- Added to NRHP: December 23, 1987
- Designated NHL: December 23, 1987
- Designated NHLDCP: January 12, 1965
- Designated NYSRHP: June 23, 1980

St. Ann & the Holy Trinity Church is a historic Episcopal church at the northwest corner of Montague and Clinton Streets in the Brooklyn Heights neighborhood of Brooklyn in New York City. It is the co-cathedral of the Episcopal Diocese of Long Island.

== History ==
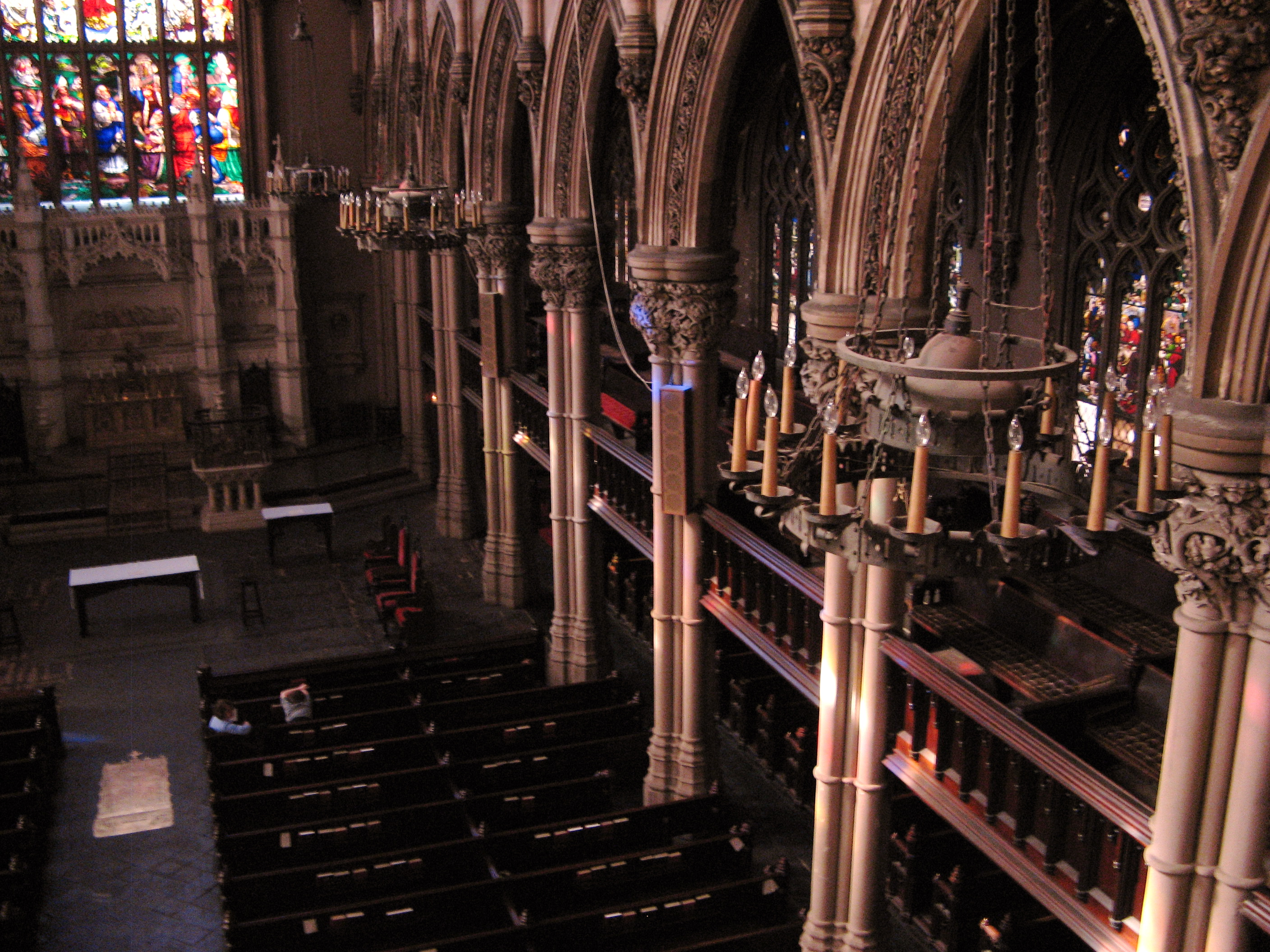
Interior

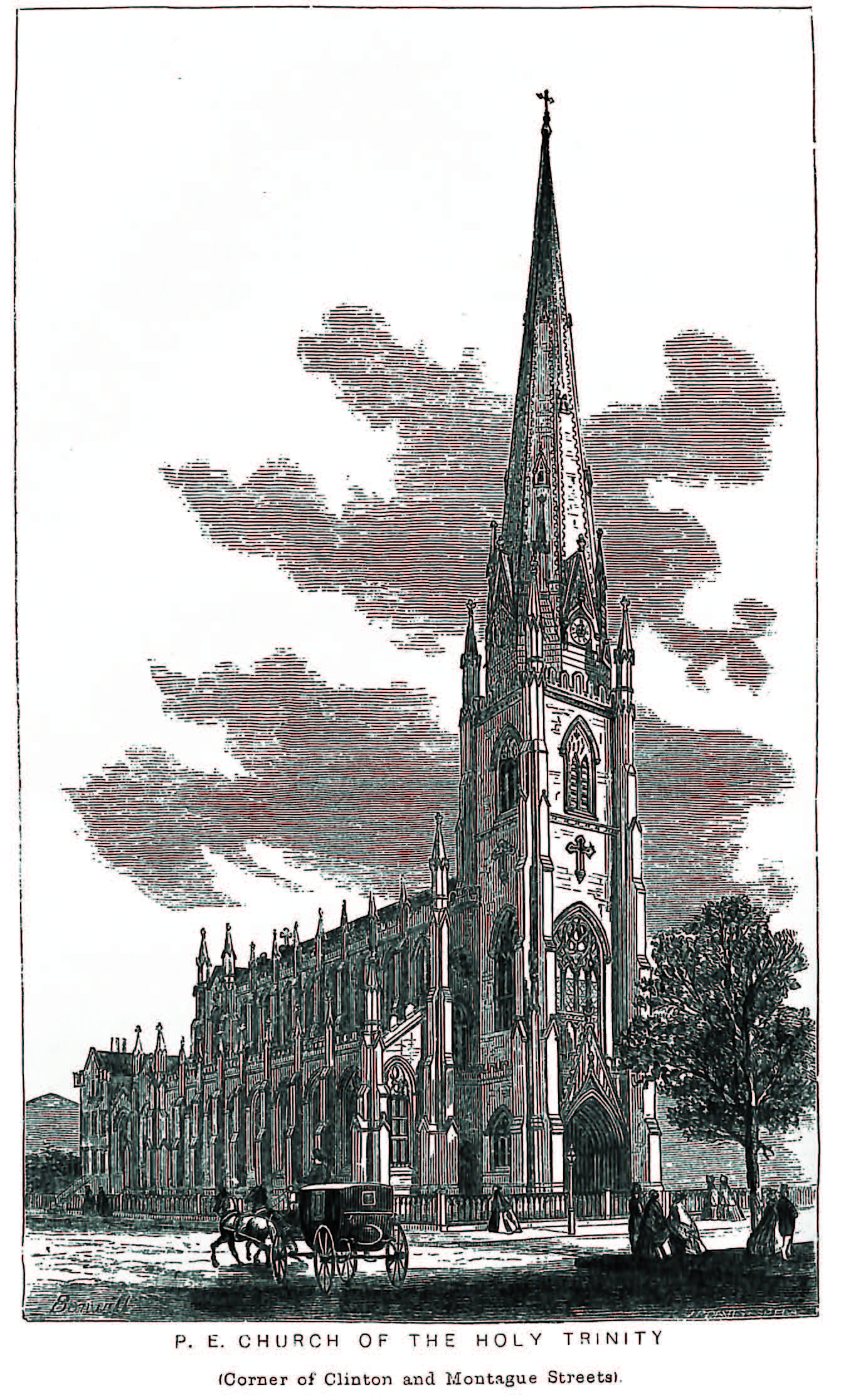
With since-removed spire

The building was built as Church of the Holy Trinity, and opened in 1847. Following years of controversy, the parish was closed in 1957. The building stood mostly empty for the next 12 years.

The present name of the parish reflects the fact that the congregation of St. Ann's, the oldest Episcopal parish in Brooklyn, moved into the empty Holy Trinity building in 1969. The church has some of the earliest figural stained-glass windows made in the United States, crafted by William Jay Bolton. The church was declared a National Historic Landmark in 1987.

The designer for Holy Trinity was prominent 19th-century American architect Minard Lafever, with stained glass by William Jay Bolton and John Bolton. In 1859 English architect Gervase Wheeler was hired to enlarge and make improvements in the chancel, such as modifications to the reading desk and adding pews; Wheeler was directed to follow the original plan in his work.

A rectory was constructed immediately west of the church between 1895 and 1897. The ground floor of this building now serves as the parish hall.

Following the departure of the St. Ann Center for Restoration and the Arts in 1999, the church complex continued to lease school, office, programming, rehearsal and concert space to a wide range of community service and arts groups. However, in 2013, full-time tenants were moved out of the Parish House.

== St. Ann's Church (1787) ==
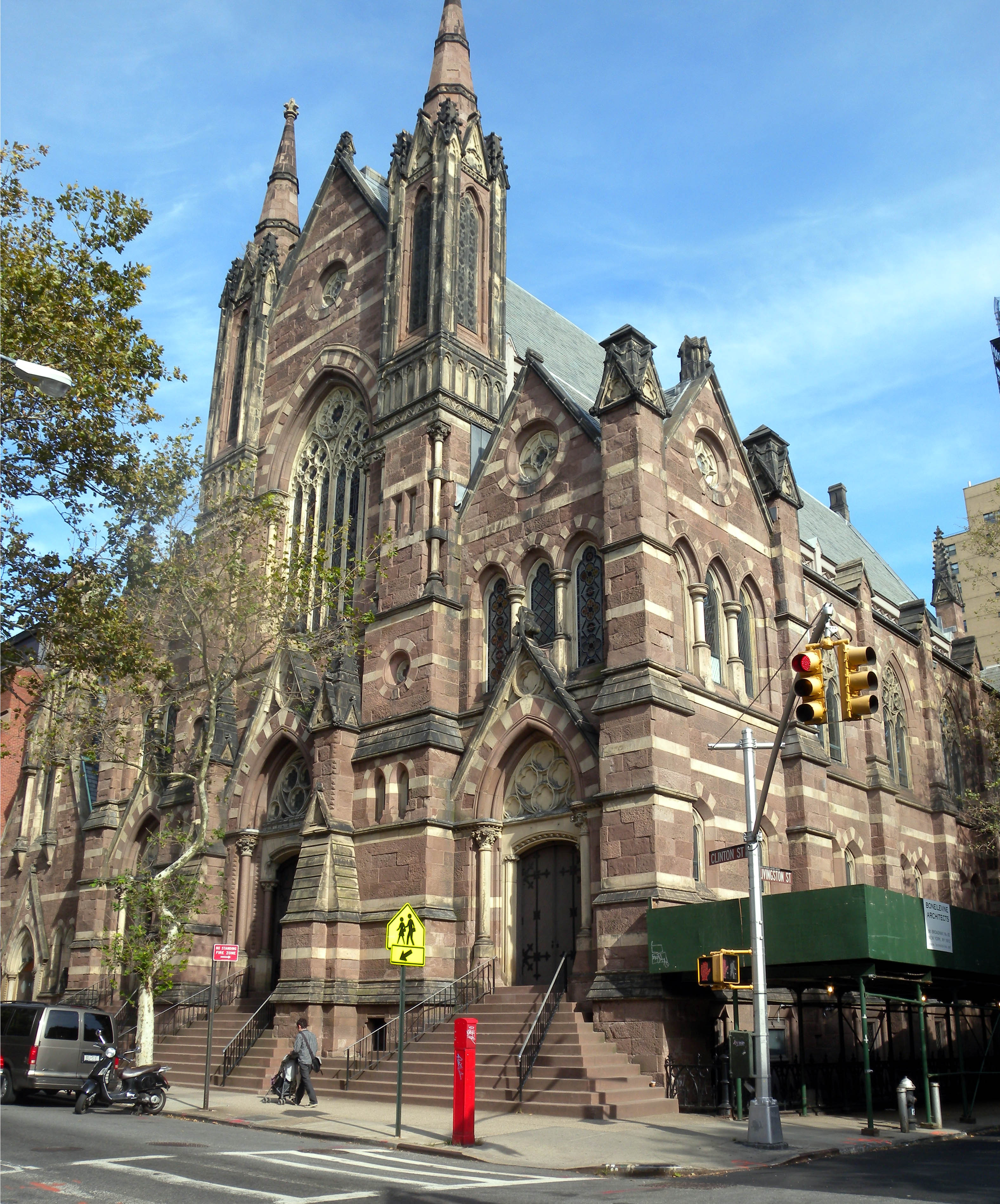
The former St. Ann's Church, designed by James Renwick Jr.

St. Ann's Church (organized 1787) was originally named in honor of Ann Ayscough Sands (1761–1851), who was an early patron with her husband Joshua Sands. The church previously occupied the elaborate High Victorian Gothic building still standing on the northeast corner of Clinton and Livingston streets, built 1877-1878 to designs by James Renwick Jr. of Renwick & Sands. That church, which featured stained glass by Henry E. Sharp, was sold to the Packer Collegiate Institute.

== Bolton stained glass windows ==
The windows of St. Ann & the Holy Trinity Church were created by William Jay Bolton with the assistance of his brother, John Bolton, between 1845 and 1848. Though preceded by a figural window Bolton made for Christ Church Priory in Pelham, NY, these windows are the first complete canon, or set, of figural stained glass windows made in North America. The Bolton windows consist of six distinct sets totaling 55 glass installations, of which 54 remain.

When the church reopened in 1969, the problem of repairing the large building after a long period of deferred maintenance initiated many conservation projects and campaigns for the complicated and costly task of restoring the church and its endangered stained glass windows. The World Monuments Fund in collaboration with the St. Ann's Center for Restoration and the Arts initiated projects in 1988 and continued repairs led to the site's listing in the World Monuments Watch in 2002 and 2004.

One of the stained glass windows, a 19' high and 10' wide window (5.8 x 3 meters) from the church's organ loft, is on display in the American wing of the Metropolitan Museum of Art. The window depicts a musical scene of Miriam and Jubal standing beneath an arrangement of musical instruments articulated in bright purple and gold painted glass

== Peabody Memorial Organ ==
The Peabody Memorial Organ was built by Ernest M. Skinner in 1925. It is the third instrument to be installed since the church opened in 1847. The organ was designed by Louis Robert and built by Ernest Skinner as his Opus #524; it was a gift to the church from parishioner and financier George Foster Peabody in memory of his brother. The organ comprises 4,718 pipes, ranging from 2 inches to 32 feet in length, as well as 20 chimes and a 61-note celesta. In 1999, it was recognized by the Organ Historical Society as "An Historic Instrument of Special Merit" — the musical equivalent of Landmark status. It is the largest E.M. Skinner organ in New York City.

Virgil Fox and Louis Vierne, organist at the Cathedral of Notre Dame in Paris, were among the world-famous organists who played the organ in Brooklyn.

Gregory Eaton, prior Dean of the Brooklyn Chapter of the American Guild of Organists, was the director of music and organist from 1993 to 2014.

== Restoration projects ==
In 1979 the New York Landmarks Conservancy, a private, not-for-profit organization, started a preservation program for the church called the St. Ann Center for Restoration and Arts. Through the program's efforts, the chancel was renovated, 64 stained glass windows restored, and the exterior fence repaired.

The church received a Sacred Sites Grant of $10,000 in 2014 for brownstone façade and roof restoration of parish house wing. A site visit confirmed that brownstone façade is deteriorated, shedding large sections of projecting trim. Roofs are actively leaking and temporarily patched and tarped, and wood windows are severely deteriorated. The large parish hall wing and formerly fully leased community spaces suffer from active leaks, plaster failure, and weather infiltration as a result of the ongoing deterioration of the exterior envelope. The estimated cost of the restoration of the exterior and interior structures of the building is $6 million.

Since 2012, The Forum at St. Ann's Arts & Culture Series organizes fundraising events with exhibitions, film screenings, poetry and book readings, panel discussions and concerts for the ongoing restorations.

== See also ==
- Saint Ann's School (Brooklyn)
- William Howard Melish
- List of National Historic Landmarks in New York City
- National Register of Historic Places listings in Brooklyn
