= Orris George Walker =

American bishop

The Right Reverend Orris George Walker D.D., D. Min., J.C.D., D.H.L.
- Bishop of Long Island
- Church: Episcopal Church
- Diocese: Long Island
- In office: 1991–2009
- Predecessor: Robert C. Witcher
- Successor: Lawrence C. Provenzano
- Previous post: Coadjutor Bishop of Long Island (1988-1991)

Orders
- Ordination: May 1, 1969 by Edward R. Welles II
- Consecration: April 9, 1988 by Edmond L. Browning

Personal details
- Born: November 5, 1942 Baltimore, Maryland, United States
- Died: February 28, 2015 (aged 72) Detroit, Michigan, United States
- Denomination: Anglican
- Spouse: Norma Eloy McKinney Dixon
- Children: 2

Orris George Walker, Jr. (November 5, 1942 – February 28, 2015) was seventh bishop of the Episcopal Diocese of Long Island.

== Educational Achievements ==
Walker was born in Baltimore, Maryland on November 5, 1942. He graduated from Baltimore City College - (a Baltimore magnet high school) in 1960. Later he attended the University of Maryland from where he earned his degree in Political Science and Philosophy in 1964. He then graduated from the General Theological Seminary in 1968 with a Bachelor of Sacred Theology. During his life he earned numerous honorary degrees, notably in 1980 when he was awarded a Doctor of Ministry from Drew University and a Master of Arts in Religious Studies in 1984 from the University of Windsor. He also received a Doctor of Canon Law from Berkeley Divinity School and a Doctor of Divinity from General Theological Seminary in 1988. He was also awarded a Master of Business Administration in Church Administration in 1993 from the Graduate Theological Union. In 2000 he was given a Doctor of Humane Letters by Saint Paul's College (Virginia).

== Ordained ministry ==
He was ordained to the diaconate on June 18, 1968 by Bishop Harry Lee Doll and became curate at Holy Nativity Church in Baltimore, Maryland. On May 1, 1969 he was ordained priest by Edward R. Welles II, Bishop of West Missouri, after which he became minister and director of program and education at St Mark's Ecumenical Church in Kansas City, Missouri. In 1971 he became associate rector of St Joseph's and St Matthew's Church in Detroit and in 1972 he was elected rector of the same church where he remained till 1988. There was a time he also served as Priest-in-Charge of St Alban's Church in Highland Park, Michigan between 1974 and 1976.

== Bishop ==
Walker was elected Coadjutor Bishop of Long Island on the seventh ballot on November 21, 1987. He was consecrated on April 9, 1988 by Presiding Bishop Edmond L. Browning in the Cathedral of the Incarnation. After his ordination, he was assigned with the responsibility of ordinations, particularly of women, noting that the diocesan, Bishop Witcher, opposed the ordination of women to the priesthood. Walker ordained Anne Lyndall and Noreen Moody, the first women priests for the Diocese of Long Island in the Cathedral of the Incarnation on 25 January 1989. He succeeded as diocesan in on January 1, 1991 and was installed in his cathedral on January 5. During his episcopacy he worked for the full inclusion of women in the ordained ministry. He retired his post in 2009.

== See also ==
- List of bishops of the Episcopal Church in the United States of America
