= Frederick Burgess =

American bishop

The Right Reverend Frederick Burgess
- Bishop of Long Island
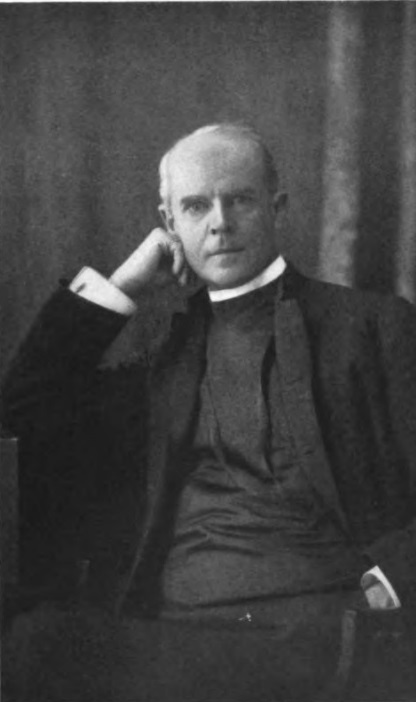
- Church: Episcopal Church
- Diocese: Long Island
- Elected: 1901
- In office: 1902–1925
- Predecessor: Abram Newkirk Littlejohn
- Successor: Ernest M. Stires

Orders
- Ordination: January 3, 1878 by Thomas M. Clark
- Consecration: January 15, 1902 by Henry C. Potter

Personal details
- Born: October 6, 1853 Providence, Rhode Island, United States
- Died: October 15, 1925 (aged 72)
- Denomination: Anglican
- Parents: Frederick Burgess & Julia Ann Niles
- Spouse: Caroline G. Bartow
- Children: 4

Frederick Burgess (6 October 1853 – 15 October 1925) was bishop of the Episcopal Diocese of Long Island from 1901 to 1925.

== Biography ==
Burgess was born on 6 October 1853 in Providence, Rhode Island. He was the nephew of George Burgess, Bishop of Maine, and Alexander Burgess, Bishop of Quincy. He graduated from Brown University in 1873, after which he studied at the General Theological Seminary in New York and then for one year at Oxford University in England. In 1898, Brown University granted him the Doctor of Divinity. He was ordained deacon in 1876 by Bishop William Woodruff Niles in Grace Church, Providence, Rhode Island, and priest in 1878 by Thomas M. Clark. He served parishes in Connecticut, Pennsylvania, and Detroit; he was also rector of Grace Church in Brooklyn, New York, from 1898 till 1901. He was elected Bishop of Long Island in 1901 and was consecrated on January 15, 1902, by the Bishop of New York, Henry C. Potter. He retained the bishopric till his death. When he died, the General Convention of the church adjourned business in his honor. He was described as a High-churchman and a conservative.
