= William Howard Melish =

American Christian and civil rights leader (1910–1986)

Reverend William Howard Melish
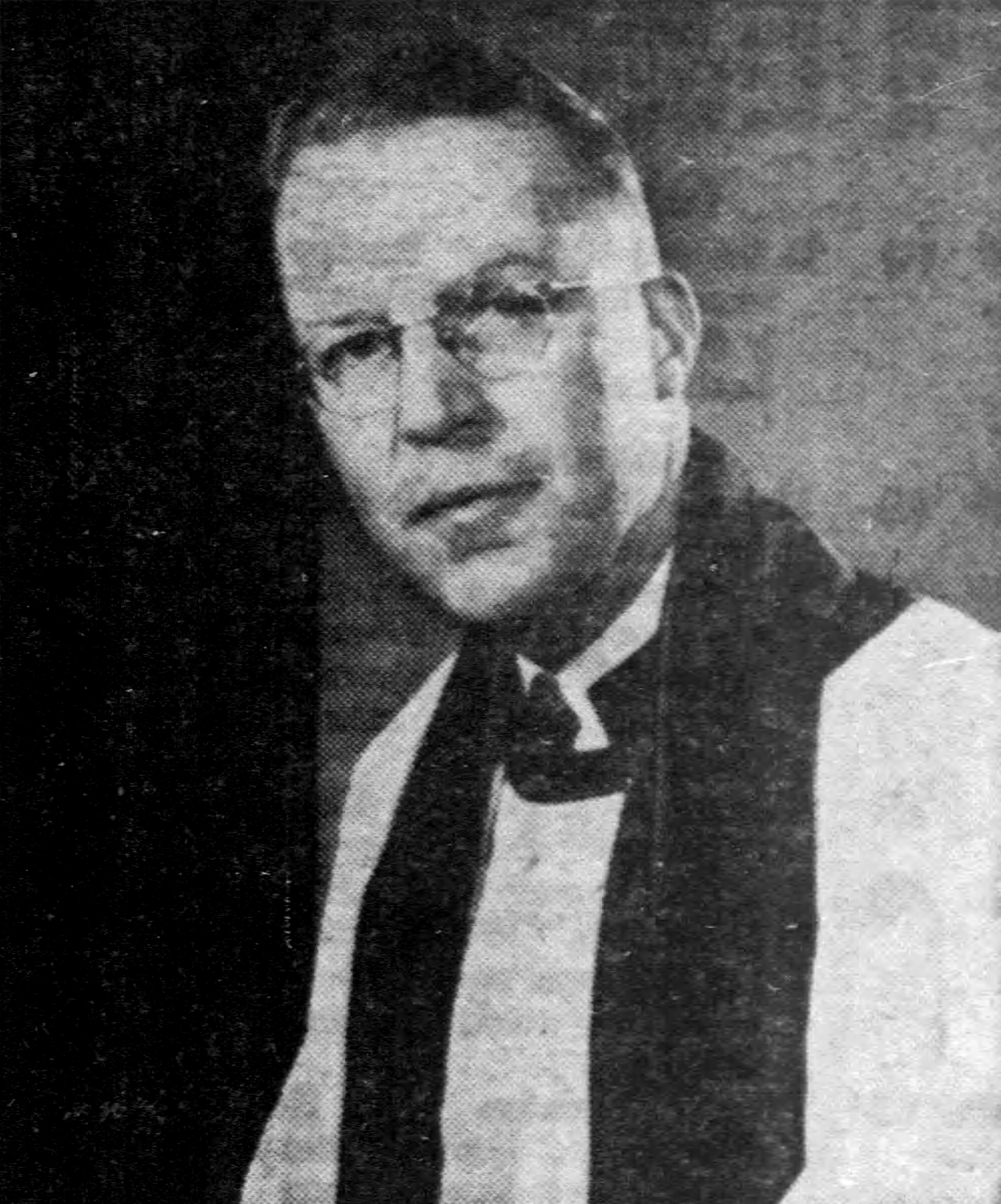
- Melish c. 1956
- Church: Holy Trinity Church, Brooklyn (renamed St. Ann & the Holy Trinity Church)

Personal details
- Born: William Howard Melish; May 11, 1910 Brooklyn, New York
- Died: June 15, 1986 (aged 76) Boerum Hill, Brooklyn, New York
- Denomination: Episcopalianism
- Parents: John Howard Melish, Marguerite McComas
- Spouse: Mary Jane Dietz
- Children: 3 sons
- Occupation: Episcopalian assistant rector, civil rights activist
- Education: Harvard University; Jesus College, Cambridge
- Alma mater: Episcopal Theological School

The Reverend William Howard Melish (May 11, 1910 – June 15, 1986) was an American Episcopalian and social leader. Head of the St. Ann & the Holy Trinity Church in Brooklyn Heights, New York City, he was driven from his Brooklyn church by the Episcopalian bishop of Long Island in the 1950s during McCarthyism in a decade-long controversy due to his association with the USSR and CPUSA.

== Background ==
William Howard Melish was born on May 11, 1910, in Brooklyn, New York. His parents were Dr. John Howard Melish and Marguerite McComas. He studied at Harvard University and then studied for the priesthood at Jesus College, Cambridge, and at the Episcopal Theological School.

== Career ==
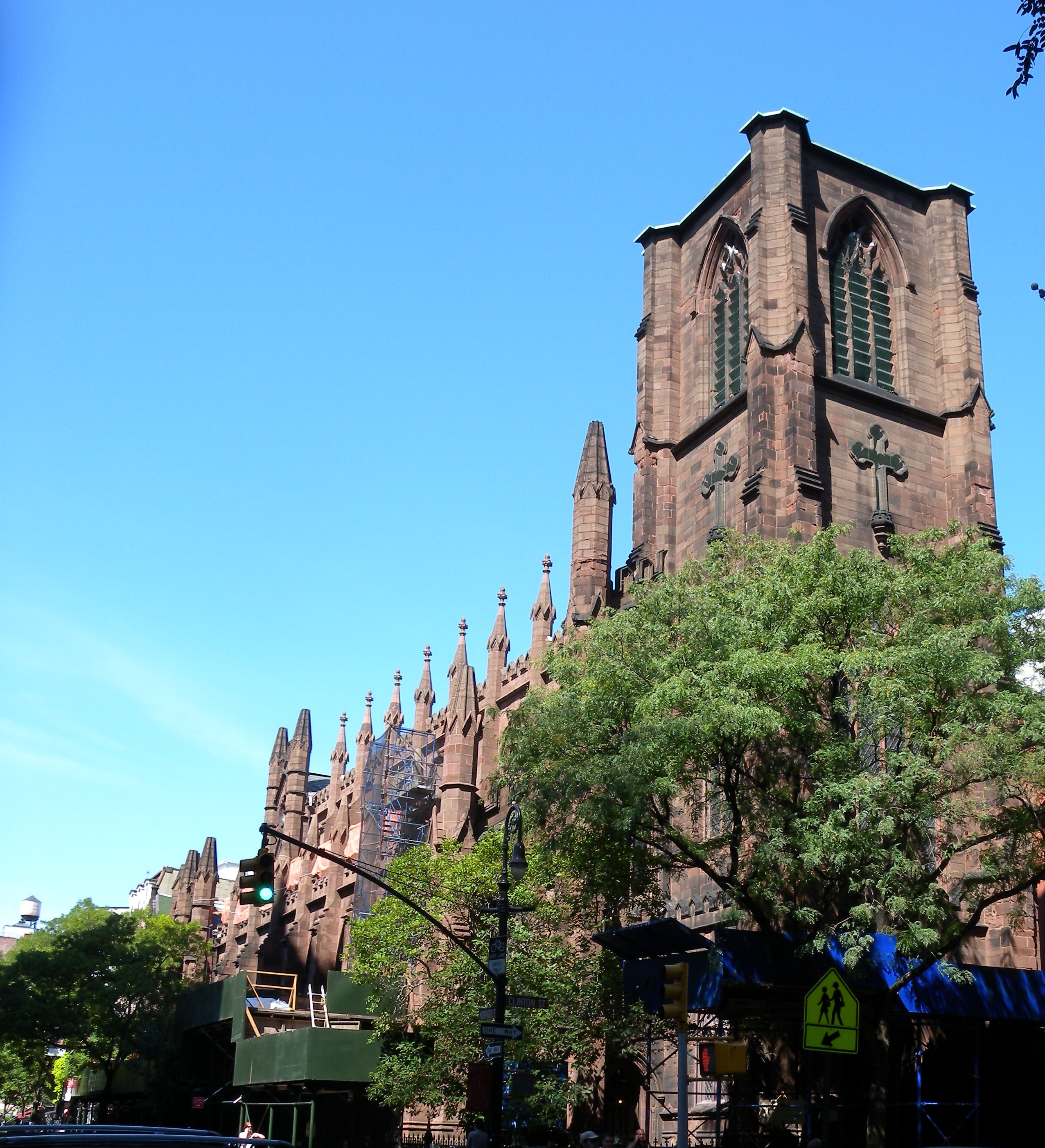
Melish led Holy Trinity Episcopal Church, depicted here as St. Ann & the Holy Trinity Church in Brooklyn Heights, New York.

In 1935, Melish began his ministry at Christ Church in Cincinnati, Ohio. In 1938, he joined his father as assistant rector at the Holy Trinity Church in Brooklyn. Melish served as assistant rector from 1938 to 1958; his father was rector there from 1904 until his ouster in 1949.

=== Political and civil activism ===
US Senator Joseph McCarthy expressed concern with Melish over his chairmanship of the National Council of American-Soviet Friendship.

In the 1940s, Melish joined the American Labor Party (then, affiliated with the Communist Party USA). Melish was also a founding member of the National Council of American-Soviet Friendship, as well as the editor for the council's biweekly publication, Reporter (CPUSA) (an English-language press of the Communist Party USA publication).

In the same period, Melish supported the civil rights movement in the South; he served as a regional representative for Southern Patriot monthly periodical of the Southern Conference Educational Fund (successor to the Southern Conference for Human Welfare).

=== Ouster ===
Melish's chairmanship (1947–1951) of the National Council of American-Soviet Friendship led both him and his father into a "bitter struggle" in the 1940s and 1950s that divided their parish as the council wound up on the Attorney General's List of Subversive Organizations in December 1947. Melish immediately and publicly opposed the list, telling the New York Times that:

the National Council... "was prepared to fight through the courts any such imputation of our loyalty... We are American citizens who stand for good relations between the United States and the Soviet Union as the key to peace... It has always been the right of American citizens under the Constitution to discuss and, if need be, criticize the foreign policy of the United States.

US Senator Joseph McCarthy investigated Melish as chairman of the council. In 1957, Bishop James P. DeWolfe of the Episcopal Diocese of Long Island closed the Holy Trinity Church in Brooklyn in 1957 and ousted Melish, who had taken over from his father in 1949. The bishop closed the church until a new congregation claimed it as "St. Ann & the Holy Trinity Church."

=== Rector, Holy Trinity v. Melish ===
The rector, church wardens, and vestrymen of the Church of the Holy Trinity in Brooklyn sued Melish and his father to leave; they refused. On June 24, 1957, the Appellate Division of the Supreme Court of New York, Second Department, found in favor of the church. On March 26, 1958, the Supreme Court of Kings County (Brooklyn) heard Rector, Holy Trinity v. Melish. Hubbell and Davies represented the plaintiffs; Raphael H. Weissman and Hubert T. Delaney represented Melish. The supreme court found in favor of the plaintiffs. The case received press coverage, including Life magazine.

=== Later life ===
After his ouster, Melish and his wife both visited the Soviet Union six times.

In 1963, Melish delivered an address at the memorial for W.E.B. DuBois.

In 1969, Melish became rector of Grace Episcopal Church Complex (Queens) for a decade until he retired in 1979. He then returned to his Brooklyn church as an assisting priest until he died.

In 1971, Melish again became chairman of the National Council of American-Soviet Friendship until 1978.

== Personal life and death ==
Melish married Mary Jane Dietz; they had three sons.

Melish advocated civil rights. He also advocated peaceful co-existence with the USSR, which in July 1948 formed part of the foreign plank of the platform of the Progressive Party (United States, 1948).

Melish lived in the Boerum Hill section of Brooklyn, New York.

Melish died age 76 on June 15, 1986, in Brooklyn.

== Awards ==
- 1956: International Peace Prize of the World Peace Council|

== See also ==
- National Council of American-Soviet Friendship
- St. Ann & the Holy Trinity Church
