= Abram Newkirk Littlejohn =

American bishop

The Right Reverend Abram Newkirk Littlejohn
- Bishop of Long Island
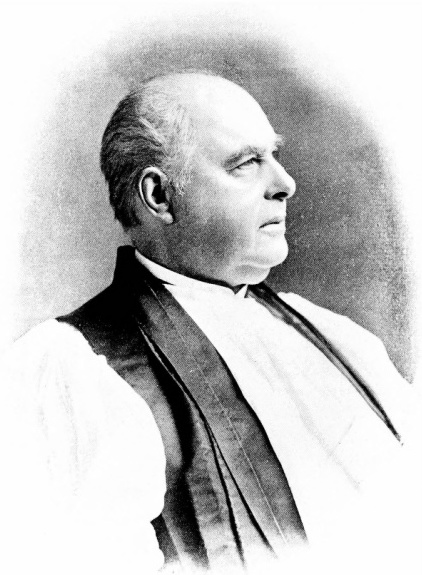
- Church: Episcopal Church
- Diocese: Long Island
- Elected: November 19, 1868
- In office: 1869–1901
- Successor: Frederick Burgess

Orders
- Ordination: June 12, 1849 by Thomas Church Brownell
- Consecration: January 27, 1869 by Horatio Potter

Personal details
- Born: December 13, 1824 Florida, Montgomery County, New York, United States
- Died: August 3, 1901 (aged 76) Williamstown, Massachusetts, United States
- Buried: All Saints Cemetery in Great Neck, New York
- Denomination: Anglican
- Parents: John Littlejohn & Eleanor Newkirk
- Spouse: Jane Matilda Armstrong
- Children: 3

Abram Newkirk Littlejohn (December 13, 1824 – August 3, 1901) was the first bishop of the Episcopal Diocese of Long Island.

== Biography ==
He was born in Florida, Montgomery County, New York and graduated from Union College, Schenectady in 1845. Littlejohn was ordained deacon on March 19, 1848, by William Heathcote DeLancey, and to the priesthood by Thomas Church Brownell on June 12, 1849. As a priest, his first parish was Christ Church (now Christ Church Cathedral), Springfield, Massachusetts. In 1868, he was elected Bishop of Central New York, but declined. He was consecrated Bishop of Long Island on January 27, 1869, and served in charge of the American Episcopal churches in Europe from 1874. In 1895, Littlejohn was among others officiating at the wedding of Consuelo Vanderbilt to the Duke of Marlborough at St. Thomas Church, Fifth Avenue.

He died in Williamstown, Massachusetts on August 3, 1901, and was buried at All Saints Cemetery in Great Neck, New York.
