= National Council of American–Soviet Friendship =

- Predecessor: National Council on Soviet Relations
- Successor: International Council for Friendship and Solidarity with Soviet People (ICFSSP)
- Formation: 1944
- Founder: Corliss Lamont
- Merger of: 1991
- Legal status: Inactive
- Purpose: American–Soviet relations
- Official language: English, Russian

The National Council of American–Soviet Friendship (NCASF) was the successor organisation to the National Council on Soviet Relations (NCSR).

== History ==
=== Foundation ===
The 1930s witnessed the birth of the American–Soviet friendship movement which revolved around the Friends of the Soviet Union, founded in 1929. One of the major goals of the movement was for the United States and the Soviet Union to form an anti-fascist alliance. This eventually led to the foundation of the NCSR, which became the NCASF in 1941. The council's membership was largely made up of professionals sympathetic to socialism and communism.

=== Structure ===
The council was formed of several different branches and offices.

=== Members ===
Corliss Lamont was one of the founders and the first chairman of the council. Professor Ralph Barton Perry of Harvard University was vice-chairman of the council. Edwin Smith was the executive director of the council.

Chairmen of NCASF
| Name | Years in service |
|---|---|
| Corliss Lamont | 1943–1947 |
| William Howard Melish | 1947–1951 |
| John Kingsbury | 1949–1956 |
| Rockwell Kent | 1957–1971 |
| William Howard Melish | 1971–1978 |
| Ewart Guinier | 1979–1984 |
| John Cherveny | 1985–1987 |
| John Randolph | 1988–1991 |

Executive Directors of NCASF
| Name | Years in service |
|---|---|
| Edwin Smith | 1944–1945 |
| Richard Morford | 1946–1981 |
| Alan Thomson | 1981–1991 |
| Roy Kaufman | 1991 |

=== Activities ===
In April 1944 at the founding of the council, Charlie Chaplin was one of the sponsors. On 16 November 1944, when an "American – Soviet Friendship Rally" was held in Madison Square Garden, a number of Hollywood movie stars — including Chaplin, John Garfield, Rita Hayworth, Orson Welles, James Cagney, Katharine Hepburn, Gene Kelly, and Edward G. Robinson — signed a message in a gesture of support. The statement said that the artists added their voices in favor of the bond that existed between "our great country and our great Allies." The message added: "In this friendship lies not only the hope but the future of the world."

In 1946 the House Un-American Activities Committee initiated a formal inquiry into the NCASF. In 1947, charges were brought against the council for failing to register with the Subversive Activities Control Board.

In May 1948, the New York Times that the new movie The Iron Curtain "has been under attack since January by various groups including the National Council of American-Soviet Friendship."

Composer Aaron Copland was later questioned by Senator McCarthy regarding his membership on the Music Committee.

=== Closure ===
In 1991, the council ceased operations.

== Successors ICFSSP and USFSP ==
NCASF's successor organization, based in Canada, is called the International Council for Friendship and Solidarity with Soviet People (ICFSSP). The magazine of the International Council is called Northstar Compass. The affiliate to the International Council in the United States is the U.S. Friends of the Soviet People (USFSP). The current officers of USFSP are Dr. Angelo D'Angelo (chair), George Gruenthal (Vice Chair), Fiona Fairchild (Secretary), and Joseph F. Hancock (Bulletin Editor).

== Legacy ==
The moving image collection of the National Council of American–Soviet Friendship is held at the Academy Film Archive. The collection consists of over 1,000 16mm prints, representing about 700 titles.

== Publications ==
During its years of operation the NCASF released numerous publications focusing upon daily life in the Soviet Union and information regarding the state of American–Soviet relations.

- Anna Louise Strong (1944). Soviet Farmers. New York: National Council of American-Soviet Friendship.
