= William Bromwell Melish =

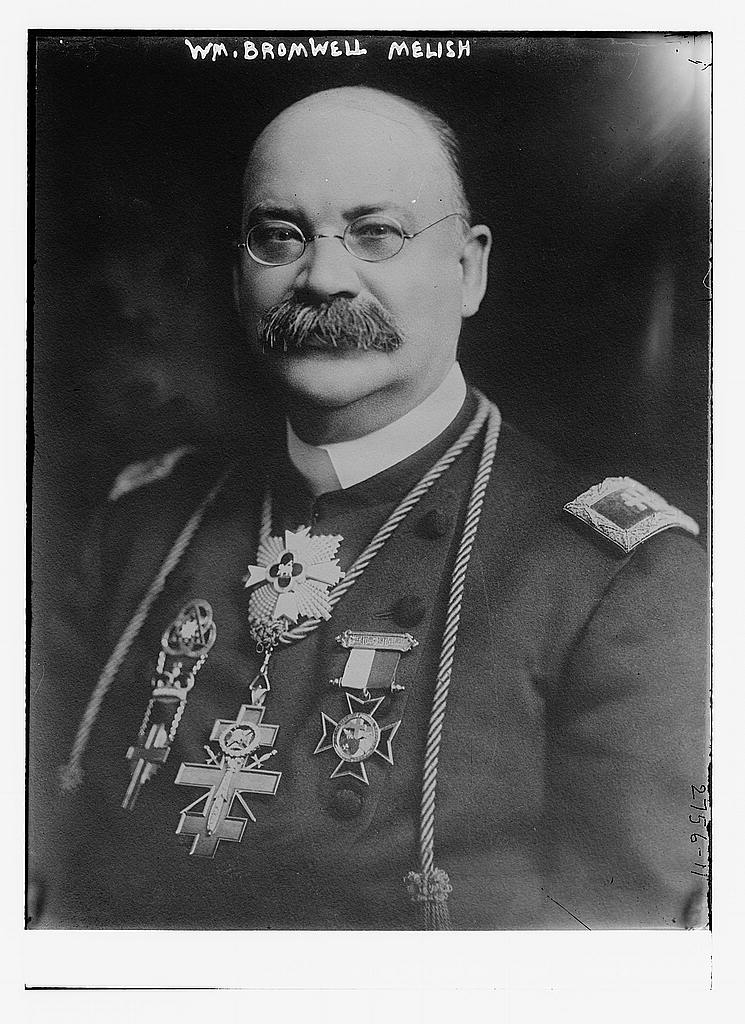
William Bromwell Melish in 1913

William Bromwell Melish (July 28, 1852 – October 21, 1927) was the President of Bromwell Brush and Wire Goods in Cincinnati and a Freemason leader. He was the Grand Master of the Grand Encampment of Knights Templar of the United States from 1910 to 1913.

== Biography ==
In 1916, Melish was elected president of the Cincinnati Chamber of Commerce.

He died on October 21, 1927, and was interred in Spring Grove Cemetery in Cincinnati, Ohio.
