= Episcopal Diocese of Long Island =

Episcopal Church diocese in the US

Diocese of Long Island

Location
- Country: United States
- Territory: New York: Brooklyn, Nassau County, Queens, Suffolk County
- Ecclesiastical province: Province II
- Archdeaconries: 4
- Coordinates: 40.719841°N 73.641672°W

Statistics
- Parishes: 129 (2025)
- Members: 32,666 (2025)

Information
- Denomination: Episcopal Church
- Established: November 18, 1868
- Cathedral: Cathedral of the Incarnation
- Co-cathedral: St. Ann & the Holy Trinity Church
- Language: English, Spanish

Current leadership
- Bishop: Adam Shoemaker; Geralyn Wolf (Assistant Bishop)

Map
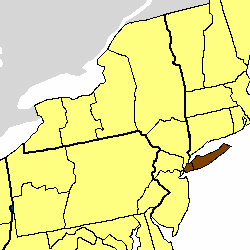

Website
- dioceseli.org

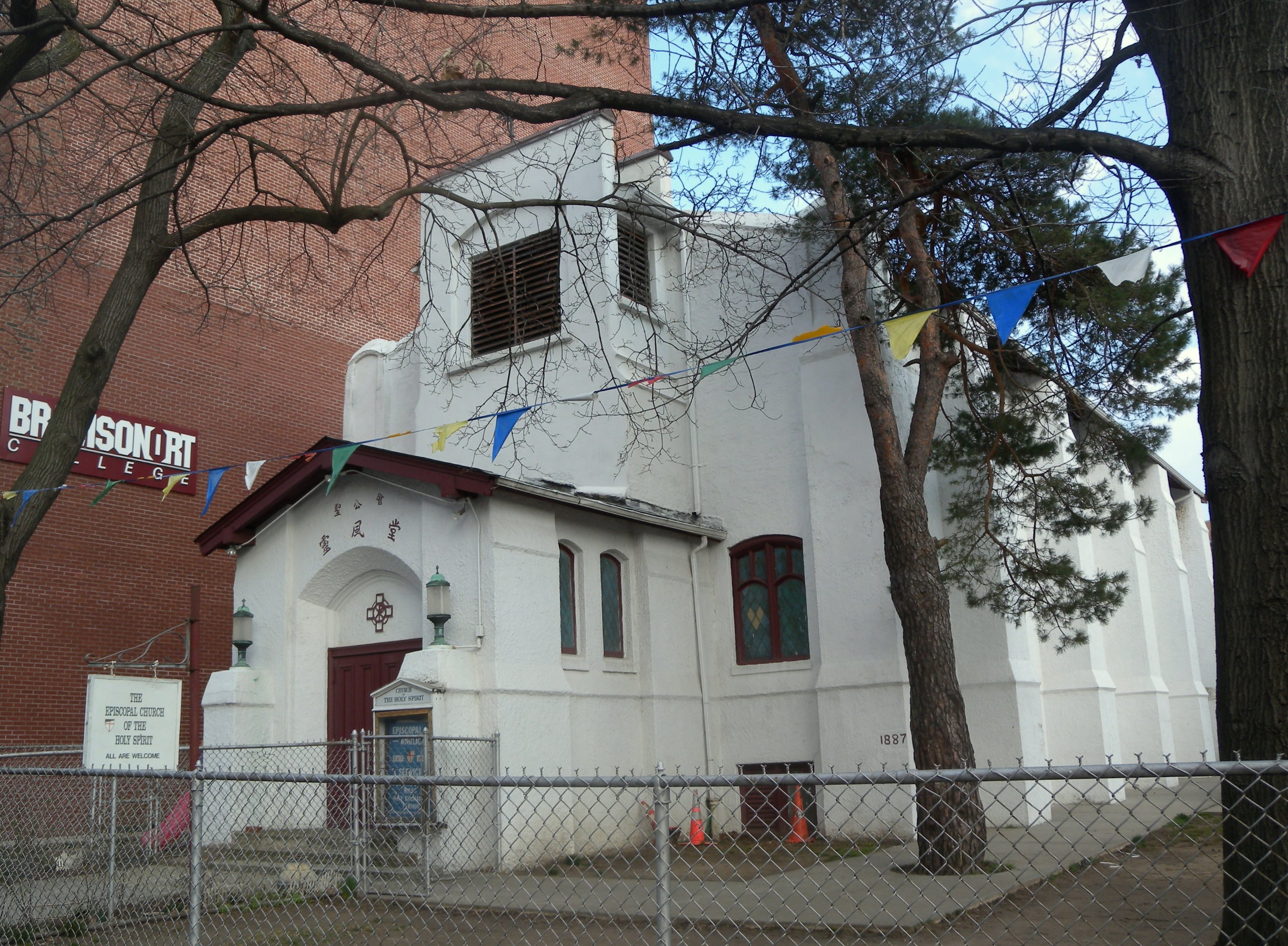
Church of the Holy Spirit, Bensonhurst, Brooklyn

The Episcopal Diocese of Long Island is the diocese of the Episcopal Church in the United States of America with jurisdiction over the counties of Kings, Queens, Nassau and Suffolk, which comprise Long Island, New York. It is in Province 2 and its cathedral, the Cathedral of the Incarnation, is located in Garden City, as are its diocesan offices.

The diocese reported 43,367 members in 2015 and 32,666 members in 2025. Plate and pledge income for the 129 filing congregations of the diocese in 2025 was $22,034,040. Average Sunday attendance (ASA) reported for 2025 was 8,445 persons, a decline from 12,939 in 2015.

== List of bishops ==
The bishops of Long Island have been:

1. Abram Newkirk Littlejohn, (1868–1901)
2. Frederick Burgess, (1901–1925)
3. Ernest M. Stires, (1925–1942)

- Frank W. Creighton, suffragan bishop (1933–1937), II Missionary Bishop of the Diocese of Mexico (1926-1933), VI Bishop of the Episcopal Diocese of Michigan (1926-1946)
- John Insley Blair Larned, suffragan bishop (1929-1946)

4. James P. deWolfe, (1942–1966)

- Jonathan G. Sherman, suffragan bishop (1949-1965)

5. Jonathan G. Sherman, (1966–1977)

- Charles W. MacLean, suffragan bishop (1963-1975)
- Richard Beamon Martin, suffragan bishop (1967-1974)

6. Robert C. Witcher, (1977–1991)

- C. Shannon Mallory, assisting bishop (1979-1980)
- Henry B. Hucles III, suffragan bishop (1981-1988)
- Orris George Walker, coadjutor (1988-1991)

7. Orris George Walker, (1991–2015)

- Rodney R. Michel, suffragan bishop (1997-2007)
- David Joslin as Apostolic Administrator (2009)
- Lawrence C. Provenzano, coadjutor (2009)

8. Lawrence C. Provenzano, bishop (2009–2026)

- Chilton R. Knudsen, assistant bishop (2014-2015)
- Geralyn Wolf, assisting bishop (2015-2016), assistant bishop (2016-present)
- R. William Franklin, assisting bishop (2019- present)

9. Adam Shoemaker (2026−present)

== History of the Diocese ==
The Diocese has benefited from large endowments, for example, $10,000 given in 1908 by Roslyn, New York resident John Ordronaux.

In 2023, as part of the Uncovering Parish Histories project, the diocese started to investigate its connections to slavery and abolition.

== See also ==
- List of bishops of the Episcopal Church in the United States of America
