= Lawrence C. Provenzano =

American bishop

The Right Reverend Lawrence C. Provenzano
- Bishop of Long Island
- Church: Episcopal Church
- Diocese: Long Island
- Elected: March 21, 2009
- In office: 2009–present
- Predecessor: Orris George Walker
- Previous post: Coadjutor Bishop of Long Island (2009)

Orders
- Ordination: May 22, 1982 by Daniel Patrick Reilly
- Consecration: September 19, 2009 by Katharine Jefferts Schori

Personal details
- Born: January 25, 1955 (age 71) Brooklyn, New York, United States
- Denomination: Anglican (prev. Roman Catholic)
- Spouse: Jeanne Marie Ross
- Children: 3

Lawrence C. Provenzano (born January 25, 1955) is the eighth and current bishop of the Episcopal Diocese of Long Island.

== Biography ==
Born Lawrence C. Provenzano on January 25, 1955, in Brooklyn, New York, he was raised as a Roman Catholic in an ethnic Italian family. He graduated with a Bachelor of Science from the State University of New York at Albany in 1980 and with a Master of Divinity from Christ the King Seminary in East Aurora, New York, in 1981. He was ordained a deacon on June 11, 1981, in the Cathedral of St Patrick in Norwich, Connecticut, and priest on May 22, 1982, in the same cathedral by Bishop Daniel Patrick Reilly. In 1981 he was appointed assistant of the Cathedral of St Patrick and in 1982 became assistant priest at St Paul's Church in Waterford, Connecticut.

In 1984, he joined the Episcopal Church. He was received as an Episcopal deacon on December 24, 1984, and as a priest in April 1985 by Bishop George Nelson Hunt. His Roman Catholic ordination is deemed valid by the Episcopal Church and hence he was not re-ordained as a deacon and priest.

He became assistant rector of Christ Church in Westerly, Rhode Island, and in 1987 he became rector of St John's Church in North Adams, Massachusetts. Between 1995 and 2009 he was rector, of St Andrew's Church in Longmeadow, Massachusetts.

He was elected Coadjutor Bishop of Long Island on March 21, 2009, on the second ballot out of six other nominees. He was consecrated as a bishop on September 19, 2009, took office on November 14, and was installed in the cathedral on November 22.

After the July 2011 passage of the Marriage Equality Act legalizing same-sex marriage in the state of New York, Provenzano required that all gay clergy living with romantic partners in rectories had to marry within the next 9 months.

During the summer of 2021, in response to the ongoing COVID-19 pandemic, Provenzano issued a pastoral letter requiring all diocesan staff and clergy to be vaccinated by September 15, 2021, with an exemption for those with underlying medical conditions.

In December 2024 Provenzano announced that he would retire by September 2025, by which he would be 70 years of age and have been bishop of Long Island for 17 years.

== See also ==
- List of Episcopal bishops of the United States
- Historical list of the Episcopal bishops of the United States
