= Cathedral of the Incarnation (Garden City, New York) =

Episcopal cathedral in Garden City, New York

The Cathedral of the Incarnation
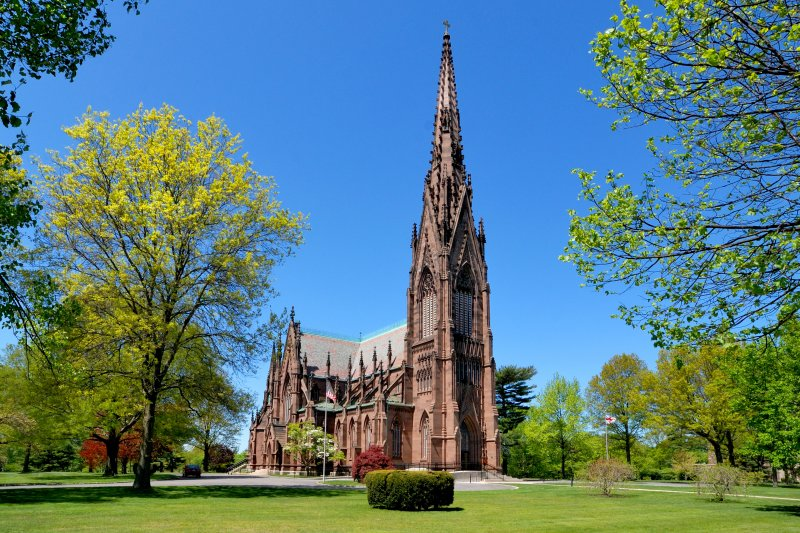
- The Cathedral of the Incarnation
- Denomination: The Episcopal Church
- Website: www.incarnationgc.org

History
- Founded: 1876
- Consecrated: 1885

Architecture
- Heritage designation: National Register of Historic Places
- Architect(s): John Kellum, Henry G. Harrison
- Architectural type: Neo-Gothic
- Style: 13th-century floriated English Gothic
- Groundbreaking: 1876
- Completed: 1885

Specifications
- Materials: Belville Brownstone (exterior facade), cast iron/iron (structural), rare marble (interior appointments)

Administration
- Diocese: The Episcopal Diocese of Long Island
- Deanery: Central Nassau

Clergy
- Bishop: Lawrence C. Provenzano
- Dean: Michael T. Sniffen

The Cathedral of the Incarnation is the cathedral church of the Episcopal Diocese of Long Island. The cathedral also serves as the centerpiece of America's first cathedral town, Garden City, New York. It was built to honor 19th-century merchant Alexander Turney Stewart, who championed the development of this Long Island community. Stewart envisioned transforming an area of the Hempstead Plains into a town featuring moderately priced housing for his employees set within a park-like atmosphere.

The Cathedral of the Incarnation is the only single-benefactory cathedral in the United States, and the only one that is built in memory of a single individual. The building is significant example of 19th-century Gothic Revival architecture.

The cathedral reported 1,277 members in 2023. Plate and pledge income for the congregation in 2024 was $507,364 with average Sunday attendance (ASA) of 237.

== History ==
=== Background and founding ===
The cathedral was conceived as a memorial to Alexander Turney Stewart (1803-1876), a prominent Irish-American merchant who became one of the wealthiest individuals in American history. Stewart was born in Lisburn, Northern Ireland, and immigrated to New York in 1818. He built a retail empire that included the famous "Iron Store" in Manhattan, which was considered America's first department store.

In 1869, Stewart purchased approximately 7,000 acres of the Hempstead Plain for $55 per acre, creating what would become Garden City. This planned community represented one of the earliest suburban developments in the United States, complete with imported trees, landscaping, and railroad connections to New York City. Garden City was a forerunner of the garden city movement of urban planning as articulated by Ebenezer Howard a generation after Stewart's village was founded.

Following Stewart's death in 1876, his widow Cornelia Clinch Stewart decided to build a church in his memory. In consultation with Abram N. Littlejohn, the first bishop of the Episcopal Diocese of Long Island, she agreed to make the memorial church the diocesan cathedral, moving the center of Episcopal life from Brooklyn to Garden City.

The cathedral was designed by architect Henry Harrison of New York City, with Stafford Drowne planning the windows and James L'Hommedieu of Great Neck serving as builder. Groundbreaking occurred in 1876, with the cornerstone laid in 1877.

On Tuesday, June 2, 1885 the Cathedral was consecrated by Bishop Littlejohn with eight other bishops and clergy from around the country present as Cornelia Stewart, accompanied by the Stewart executor Judge Henry Hilton, presented the deed of conveyance and a bond of $300,000 as an endowment for the care and maintenance of the building. The project included not only the cathedral but also the Cathedral School of St. Paul for boys, the Cathedral School of St. Mary for girls, and a 32-room Bishop's House. St. Paul's School, dedicated in 1879, eventually accommodated 300 boys on its 40 acre site, while the Cathedral School of St. Mary was built in 1892.

== Governance ==
The cathedral operates under a traditional Episcopal governance model combining clerical leadership with lay participation. The dean of the cathedral serves as the primary administrator under the bishop's authority, responsible for day-to-day operations, liturgical planning, and pastoral care. Cathedral staff includes various canonical positions, including canons responsible for specialized ministries such as music, pastoral care, and family ministries.

=== Deans of the cathedral ===
The Cathedral of the Incarnation has been led by thirteen deans since its establishment:

- 1890–1903: Samuel Cox
- 1903–1916: John Robert Moses
- 1916–1926: Oscar Frederick Rudolph Treder
- 1927–1933: George Paul Torrence Sarent
- 1933–1940: Arthur B. Kingsolving II
- 1940–1943: George Arthur Robertshaw
- 1944–1953: Hubert Stanley Wood
- 1953–1955: James Green
- 1957–1978: Harold Frank Lemoine
- 1979–1999: Robert Vidal Wilshire
- 1999–2004: James Joseph Cardone Jr.
- 2005–2014: Theodore William Bean Jr.
- 2015–present: Michael T. Sniffen

=== Current leadership ===
Canon Michael T. Sniffen has served as the 13th Dean of the Cathedral of the Incarnation since 2015. His tenure has been marked by significant expansion of liturgical offerings, establishment of new outreach ministries, and completion of major restoration and building projects. In his capacity as Dean of Long Island, Sniffen concurrently serves multiple roles:

- Dean of the Cathedral
- Dean of the Mercer School of Theology
- Dean of Central Nassau County
- Chairman of the Board of the Center for Spiritual Imagination

In collaboration with Morgan Ladd, Sniffen introduced Cathedral for Kids!, a Book of Common Prayer-based Eucharist inspired by Fred Rogers, designed to focus on the spiritual formation of young children. This service has become the cathedral's most attended Sunday morning liturgy. Other innovative programs include the Neighborhood Mass, a weekly outdoor Eucharist held from Memorial Day to Labor Day that welcomes companion animals, and Cathedral for Pets, which offers pet ministry and regular prayer services along with pastoral care for animals and their caregivers.

Under Sniffen's leadership, the cathedral undertook Incarnation 2020, the largest building project since the cathedral's dedication in 1885. This comprehensive renovation included:

- Installation of an elevator for improved accessibility, the only addition to the original cathedral footprint since its inception
- Renovation of the undercroft
- Restoration of the cathedral's worship space to its original 19th-century flexible configuration
- Rebuilding of the cathedral's principal pipe organ
- Restoration of the high altar

=== Property redevelopment ===
Significant property developments during Sniffen's tenure include:

- Demolition of Cathedral House and conversion of See House into administrative offices and gathering space
- Purchase and renovation of Walker House (on nearby 3rd Street) into a ten-bedroom retreat center
- Reacquisition of 32 Cathedral Avenue—an original Garden City Apostle House—now serving as the deanery, dedicated as residential space for seminarians, faculty, and visiting scholars

=== Educational initiatives ===
The cathedral has developed Cathedral College, a new clergy formation program created in partnership with Codrington College in the Church in the Province of the West Indies. Sniffen serves as a member of the faculty for this program.

=== COVID-19 response ===
During the COVID-19 pandemic, Sniffen initiated Operation Feed the Front, which provided thousands of meals to front-line workers in collaboration with local kitchens.

=== Ongoing ministries ===
Additional ministries established under current leadership include:

- Prison outreach program
- Chaplaincy at Adelphi University
- INNcarnation ministry in partnership with the Interfaith Nutrition Network in Hempstead, NY
- The Center for Spiritual Imagination, founded in 2020, which operates within a spiritual ecology characterized by ancient rhythms, community nurturing, and a focus on justice work

=== Military service ===
Since 2020, Sniffen has also served as a commissioned officer in the United States Navy Chaplain Corps and is currently chaplain of the United States Marine Corps Empire Battalion.

== Architecture ==
=== Design and style ===
The Cathedral of the Incarnation exemplifies 13th-century English Gothic Revival architecture, specifically the Decorated Gothic style. Representing a shift from early 19th-century "Gothick" experimentation toward academic precision, the design follows the principles of structural honesty championed by architects like Richard Upjohn and James Renwick Jr. By avoiding the faux-vaulting and heavy "Castellated" battlements common in earlier American churches, the cathedral achieves a mature expression of the Gothic Revival.

The building measures 175 feet in length and 96 feet in width, with an 80-foot bell tower topped by a 130-foot spire, creating a total height of 210 feet. The structure is crowned with a nine-foot illuminated brass cross that was visible from Brooklyn and the East River.

The cathedral is constructed of brownstone quarried in Belleville, New Jersey, and incorporates advanced 19th-century building techniques including iron beams and cast iron columns. This construction method allows for slender interior columns, a soaring 53-foot ceiling, and abundant natural light while reducing the need for exterior flying buttresses.

The decorative scheme throughout the cathedral features flora native to Long Island, including flowers, fruits, nuts, and foliage motifs. The building sits on 23 park-like acres and includes extensive use of rare marbles collected by Stewart from England, France, and Belgium.

=== Interior features ===
The cathedral's interior follows traditional Gothic church layout with several notable features:

Narthex: The entrance contains 60 windows created by Clayton & Bell of London, depicting Old Testament patriarchs and prophets. The floor features a brass inlay of the Stewart coat of arms with the motto "Prudentia et Constantia" (Prudence and Perseverance).

Nave: Originally designed without pews in the medieval tradition, the nave contains 22 clerestory windows filled with depictions of heavenly choirs. The main level windows, also by Clayton & Bell, illustrate the birth and early life of Jesus Christ in a unified color scheme of red, blue, gold, and green. A recent "reseating" of the cathedral in 2020 removed the early 20th-century Mexican mahogany fixed pews and installed movable benches and chairs by British furniture designer Luke Hughes.

Transepts: The south transept features the Jesse Window, depicting the genealogy of Christ, while the north transept contains the Te Deum window illustrating the ancient hymn "Te Deum Laudamus."

Sanctuary: The high altar, carved from Italian statuary marble by Cox & Co. of London, features panels showing important events in the life of Jesus. Above the sanctuary is a Byzantine-style icon of Christ as "Pantocrator" installed in 2001.

==== Stained glass ====
The cathedral's extensive stained glass program was executed primarily by the London firm Clayton & Bell, with additional windows by Heaton, Butler & Bayne. The 70 windows in the narthex, nave, and chancel maintain a unified color scheme and tell the story of Christ's life and the Christian faith through visual narrative, following the medieval tradition of serving as a "Bible in glass" for the faithful.

==== High altar ====
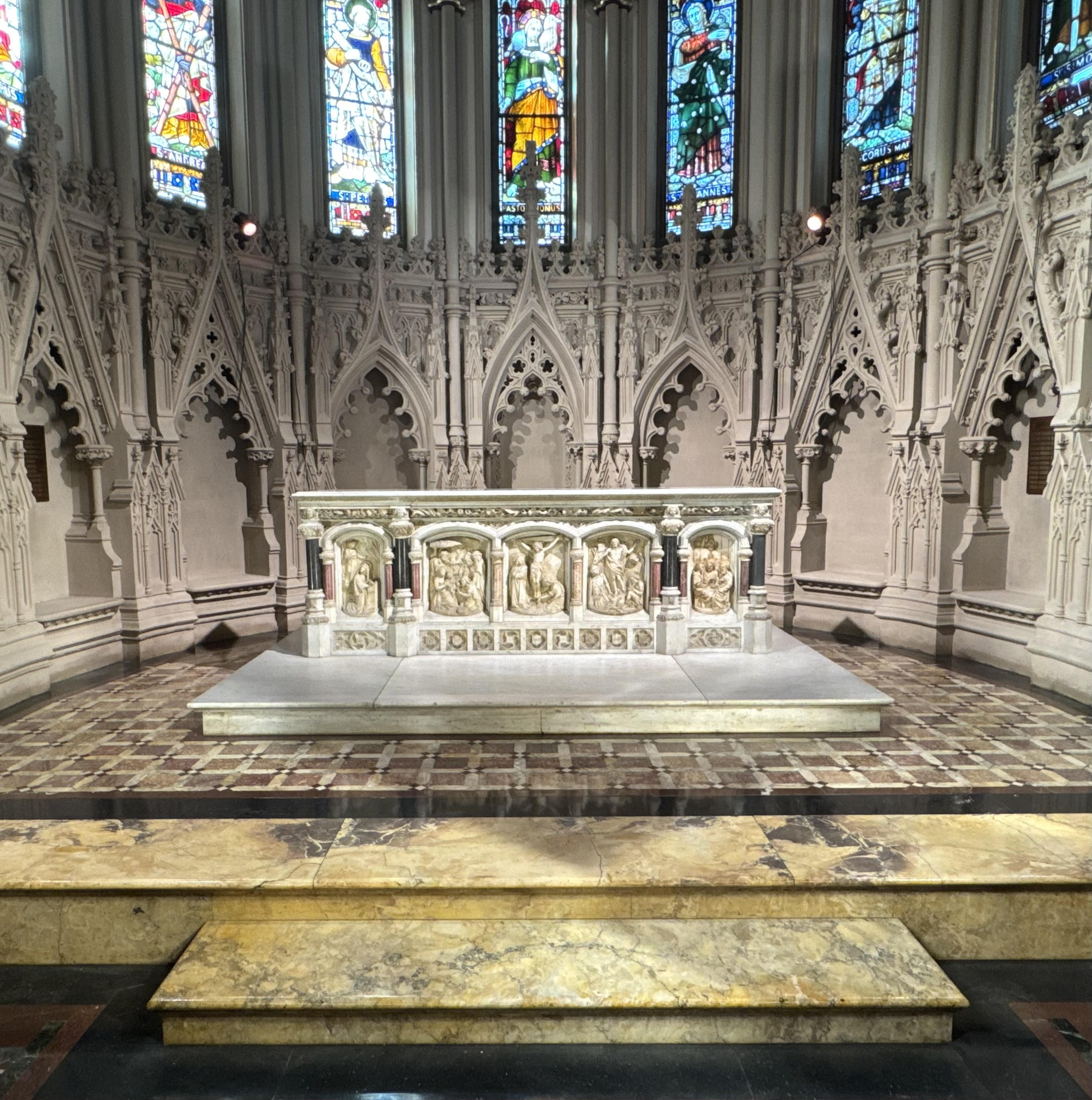
High Altar in its 1957-2024 configuration

The cathedral's high altar, designed by Henry Harrison and carved in Belgium, serves as both the visual focal point for Eucharistic fellowship and a teaching tool depicting the life, death, and resurrection of Jesus Christ. The 19th-century masterpiece features complete carving on all four sides, with the south and north panels depicting the Annunciation and the Appearance of Jesus at Emmaus respectively. The east side presents three scenes from Christ's life: the Nativity in Bethlehem, the Crucifixion, and the Harrowing of Hell, while the west side illustrates three Hebrew Bible scenes: the Temptation of Adam and Eve, the Sacrifice of Isaac, and Moses with the Bronze Serpent.

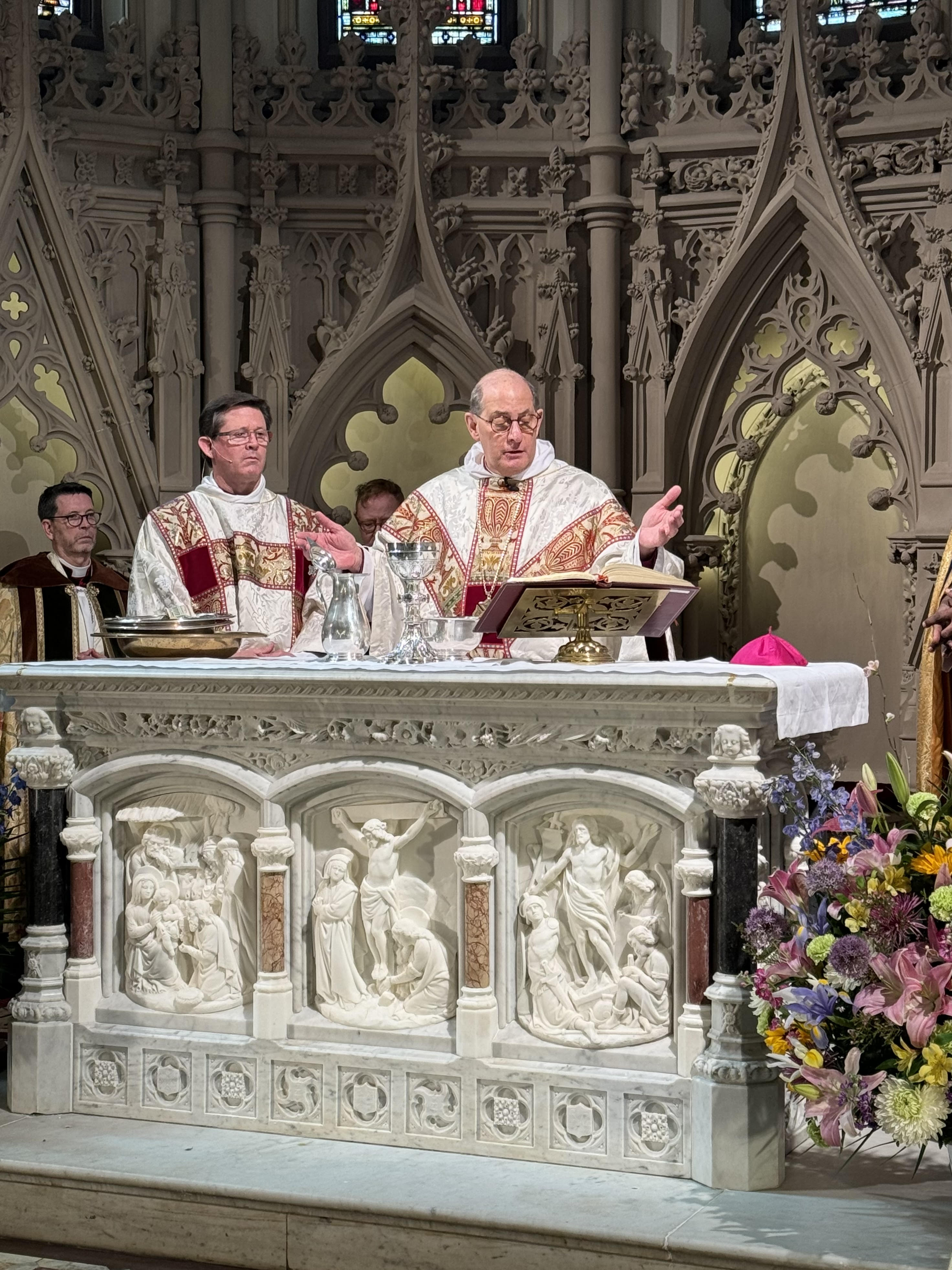
Bishop Provenzano presiding at the newly restored High Altar, returning to its original configuration and placement, Easter Vigil 2024

In the late 1950s, changing liturgical preferences led to alterations that compromised the altar's original design and visual impact. The poorly executed masonry work inhibited the use of the canon's stalls in the apse and rendered the presider's stall unusable.

During Lent 2024, as part of ongoing restoration efforts under Sniffen, the altar was restored to its original 1885 configuration. The restoration involved disassembling, cleaning, and repairing the intricate stonework in situ, repositioning the side panels that had been rotated ninety degrees in the 1950s back to their north and south orientations, and repairing the marble inlays. The restoration returned the upper sanctuary to its original layout, providing more space around the altar and restoring functionality to the canon's and presider's stalls.

==== Undercroft and crypt ====
The cathedral's undercroft contains various functional spaces including choir practice areas, vesting rooms, and the Chapel of the Resurrection. This 16-sided marble polygon features chapel a 20-foot domed ceiling and serves as the burial place of Cornelia Clinch Stewart and, reportedly, Alexander Turney Stewart, though the identification of Stewart's remains has been subject to historical controversy due to the theft of his body in the 1870s. The second, fourth, and seventh Bishops of Long Island - Frederick Burgess, James Pernette deWolfe, and Orris G. Walker - are also interred here.

== Worship ==
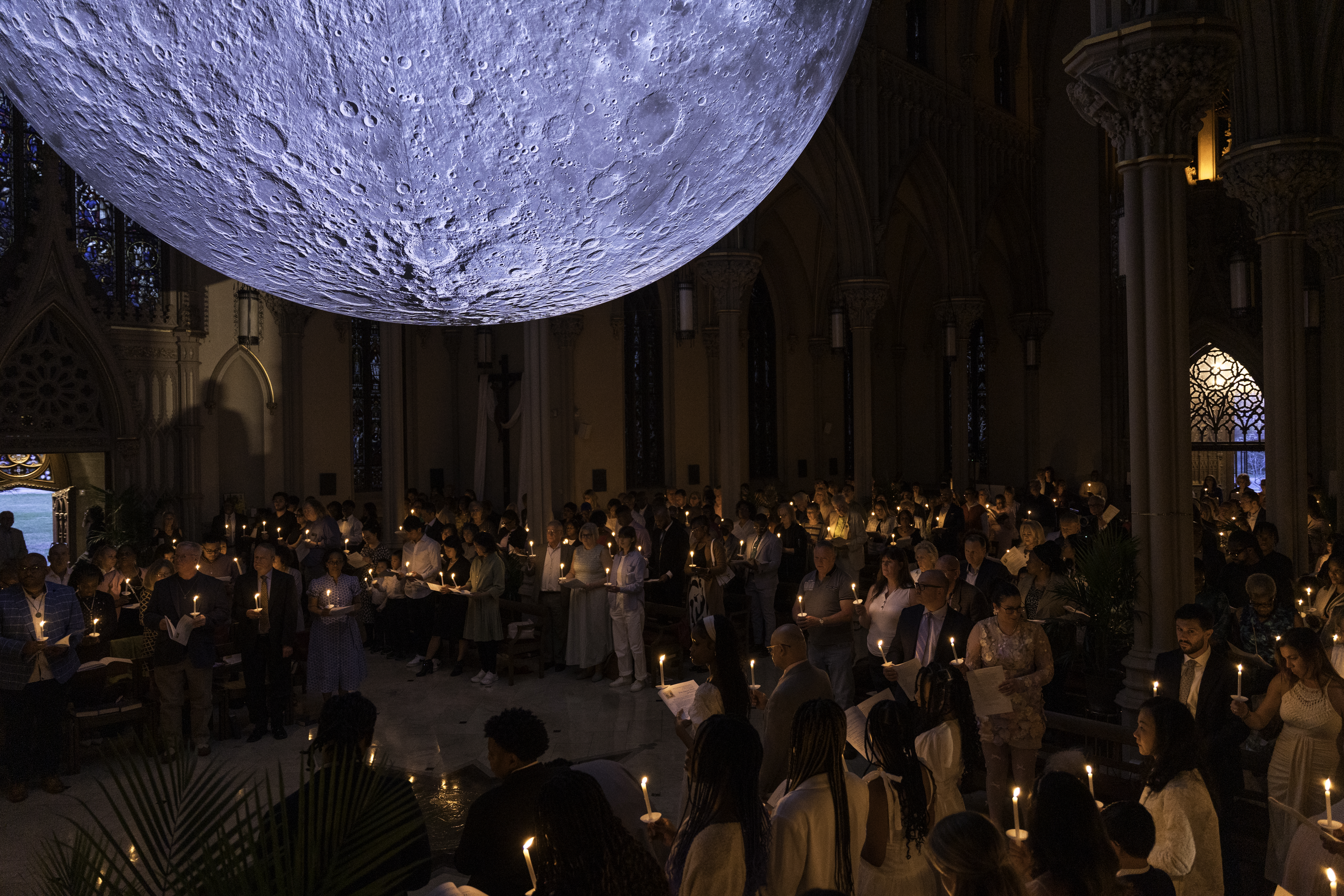
The Great Vigil of Easter (2025) during the Moon as Sacred Mirror residency of artist Luke Jerram's "Museum of the Moon" sculpture

The cathedral is home to one of the largest worshipping congregations in the diocese and hosts regular Sunday and weekday masses, as well as a variety of special liturgies and commemorations of other feast days.

=== Program year (mid-September through May) ===
Sunday Masses are held at 8:00 AM, 9:15 AM, and 11:15 AM. The 8:00 AM service is a simplified liturgy using the traditional language of Rite I from the Book of Common Prayer. The 9:15 AM "Cathedral for Kids" Mass is a multi-generational service featuring youth-friendly preaching, incorporating seasonal Taizé music and Anglican repertoire performed by the Cathedral's boy and girl choristers. The 11:15 AM Choral Mass represents the full expression of Anglican liturgical tradition, featuring incense, chanting, full choir, and other ceremonial elements.

During the program year, Daily Mass is offered Monday through Friday at noon, with Wednesday Mass including prayers for healing and the anointing with oil.

=== Summer season (June through early September) ===
The summer schedule adjusts to 8:00 AM, 9:15 AM, and 10:15 AM. The 8:00 AM service remains unchanged from the program year format. The 9:15 AM "Neighborhood Mass" is dog-friendly and takes place outdoors under a tent on the Cathedral Close in a casual atmosphere with a cappella hymns. The 10:15 AM Sung Mass maintains Anglican musical heritage through congregational singing and organ voluntaries during the choir's summer recess.

During the summer, Daily Mass continues only on Wednesdays and is celebrated in the Chapel of the Good Shepherd, located in the Mercer School of Theology also located on the Cathedral Close.

=== Special liturgies ===
In addition to the Sunday and daily masses, the cathedral is the setting for a variety of liturgies highlighting diocesan life, including:

- Ordinations to the diaconate and to the priesthood
- Confirmation, Reception, and the Reaffirmation of Baptismal Vows
- The Feast of St. Francis and Blessing of the Animals
- Feast of Blessed Absalom Jones
- The Chrism Mass
- The Juneteenth Jubilee

=== Incarnation Chapel ===
Incarnation Chapel is a ministry of the Cathedral of the Incarnation located in Carle Place, New York at the old St. Mary's Church. An intergenerational community celebrating evening Eucharist welcoming the sabbath on Saturday evenings at 5pm, the liturgy invites full participation of the congregation in prayer and song from the resources of both the Western and Eastern Church. Saturday masses are followed by a communal pot luck supper and fellowship.

Other feasts and festivals enhance the liturgical life of the larger Cathedral community, including:

- Burial Vespers for the Lord on Good Friday
- The Vigil of the Feast of Pentecost
- Día de los Muertos - a special All Saints Day/All Souls Day family event celebrating the Mexican and Latin American festival of the Day of the Dead
- St. Nicholas Day - the feast day of Nicholas of Myra

The chapel also emphasizes adult Christian Formation, discipleship, and education in collaboration with the cathedral and other congregations in the Central Nassau Deanery.

== Music ministry ==
=== History ===
The cathedral has long been known for its music ministry, led by Lawrence Tremsky since 2000. The Men & Boys Choir, modeled after English cathedral choirs, began rehearsing prior to the completion of the building in 1885. Since few people lived in the area around the cathedral in its initial years, the Garden City station on the Long Island Railroad was constructed to transport the boys from their homes in Brooklyn or Manhattan to rehearsals and services. During the 1930s, the cathedral formed the first American cathedral girls' choir, which quickly became a staple of the music program. In the 1990s an ensemble called the Schola Cantorum was started to give adult women an opportunity to take part in cathedral music.

=== Current program ===
The music program evolved over the years, and COVID-19 caused a significant restructuring of choral forces. The cathedral choir now consists of professional and volunteer singers from the congregation, mainly former choristers and adults whose music reading skills allow them to keep up with the fast pace of music learning. The Cathedral Choristers, made up of boys and girls singing together, sing at the Cathedral for Kids Mass, and older choristers join the adults for monthly evensong. The chorister program is at its strongest in many years, boasting 25+ young singers.

The cathedral choirs sing a repertoire of choral music, from plainsong to modern works, selected carefully to coincide with the themes of the season. Evensong is sung on the first Sunday of each month in the traditional English cathedral model (Magnificat, Nunc Dimittis, an anthem, and Anglican chant psalms). Special seasonal liturgies include A Festival of Nine Lessons & Carols before Christmas, a Tenebrae service on Holy Wednesday, and full choirs throughout the Triduum featuring a sung version of the Passion.

=== Organs and other instruments ===
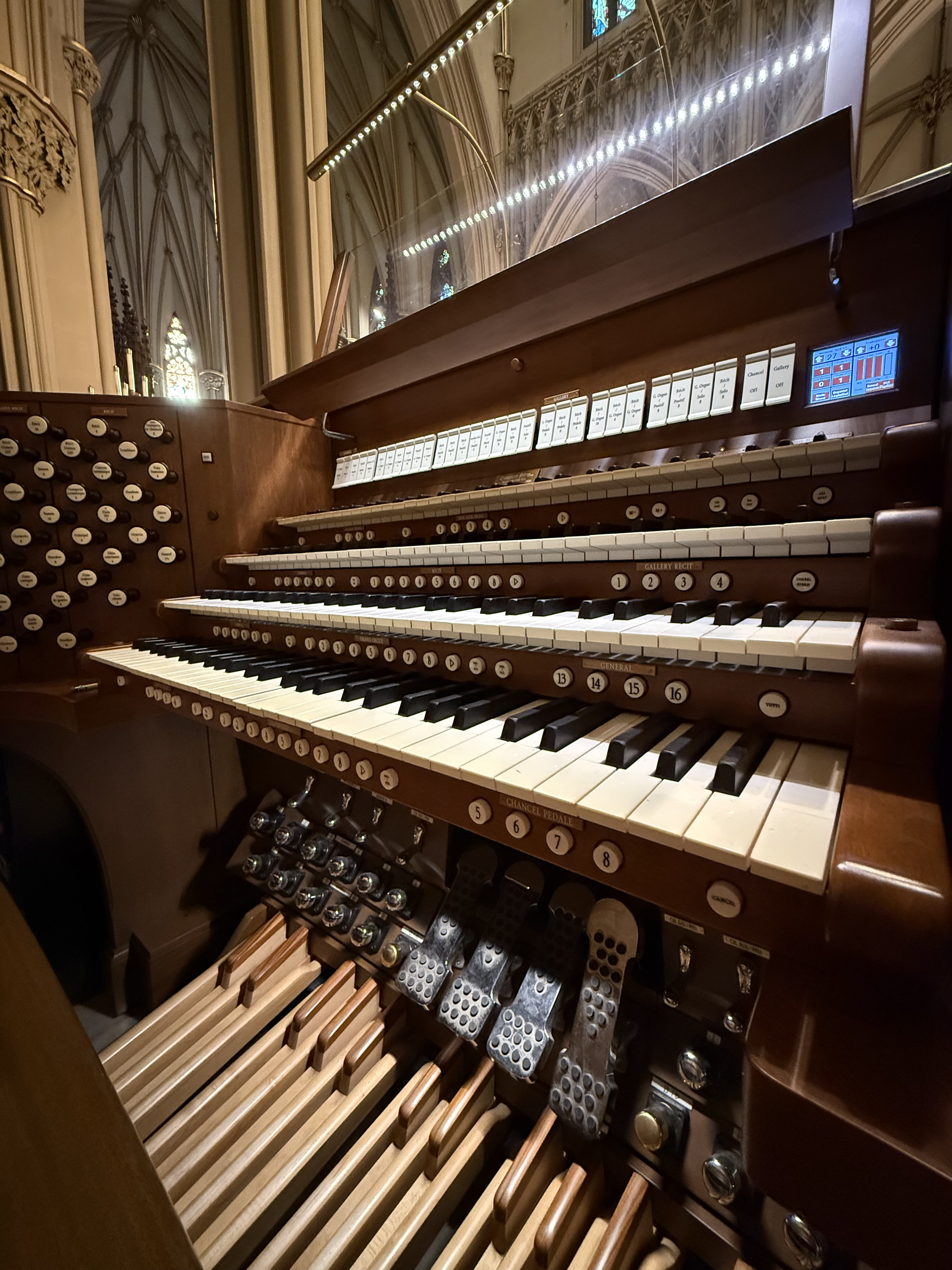
Console of the current Casavant Frères organ

The cathedral has had four organs in its history. The first by Hilborne Roosevelt was installed in 1883 before the building was opened in 1885. In 1925, the Roosevelt instrument was revised by Casavant Frères Limitée of St. Hyacinthe, Quebec, using much of the old pipework and adding several characteristic French stops. In 1963, the Herman Schlicker Firm of Buffalo, New York built a new instrument for the cathedral based on neo-baroque style popular in organ building at the time. Some old pipework remained, but the spirit of the former romantic instrument was truly gone. That instrument was replaced with the current organ, another constructed by Casavant Frères in 1986, on the 110th anniversary of the death of A. T. Stewart. This instrument is based on French Romantic models and is the largest pipe organ on Long Island. In 2022 the organ received a considerable amount of work on a joint project by Casavant and Foley Baker of Tolland, Connecticut. This project included, among other modernizations, the addition of several digital stops, all at 32' pitch, to augment the tonal prowess of the organ.

The cathedral music program also uses a Taylor & Boody continuo organ (2020) of five stops, donated in memory of a former parishioner. In addition, the cathedral has a 1932 Steinway full size concert grand piano, which was completely refurbished in 2018.

=== Bells ===
The cathedral's bells were cast by the McShane Bell Company for the 1876 U.S. Centennial Exhibition in Philadelphia. Cornelia Stewart acquired them after attending the centennial and had them installed for the cathedral's opening. The bells were mechanized in the 1960s and continue to ring out hymns, patriotic songs, and seasonal carols.

== Fellowship in Faith ==
The cathedral's Christian education program - called Fellowship in Faith - runs on Sundays from September through May. Multigenerational classes are held from 10:00 AM to 11:00 AM, scheduled between the 9:15 AM Cathedral for Kids Mass and the 11:15 AM Choral Mass.

=== Programs and activities ===
The program includes educational lessons for young people that incorporate biblical teachings, Christian tradition, and elements from the natural world. Youth participants in grades 6-12 gather monthly to engage in community service projects.

The Dean's Forum serves adult participants through discussions led by clergy and visiting faculty members. Topics covered include biblical studies, sacred art and literature, and various aspects of Christian tradition.

=== Confirmation and Eucharist education ===
The cathedral conducts annual confirmation programs for both youth and adults, with confirmation rite is traditionally held during the Great Vigil of Easter. Additionally, a spring course is offered for parents and children focusing on the church's theology of the Eucharist.

=== Community events ===
The program organizes several community events throughout the year for the broader Long Island area:

- An annual All Hallows' Eve event
- A diocesan-wide Harry Potter Banquet
- Advent Wreath Making workshops
- A 4:00 PM Christmas Eve Pageant
- The MLK Jr. Community Kitchen
- An annual Easter Egg Hunt featuring thousands of candy-filled eggs hidden on the cathedral grounds

All Fellowship in Faith courses and activities are offered free of charge and open to the public.

== Outreach programs ==
=== Community outreach ===
The Cathedral of the Incarnation operates several community outreach programs centered around its location on Jackson Street in Hempstead, New York. The cathedral's outreach ministries provide weekly services to local residents, including regular meal service twice per week and special occasion meals. The programs also offer street-based prayer services and collaborate with various Nassau County organizations to provide community support and assistance.

=== Prison ministry ===
The cathedral maintains an active ministry program at the Nassau County Correctional Center. The program includes visitation services, prayer sessions, worship services, and meditation programs for incarcerated individuals. As of fall [year needed], the ministry expanded to include services at the facility's Women's Unit. The program is coordinated by Denise Galloway.

=== Food security programs ===
The cathedral supports food security initiatives through its partnership with the Interfaith Nutrition Network (INN). This collaboration includes:

- Volunteer service at the Mary Brennan INN soup kitchen in Hempstead
- Seasonal collection drives for toiletries during spring and school supplies in fall
- Fundraising events to support INN programs

=== Campus ministry ===
The cathedral's clergy serve as chaplains at neighboring Adelphi University, providing pastoral care, spiritual guidance, and religious programming to the university community. Campus chaplains typically offer counseling services, facilitate interfaith dialogue, lead worship services, provide crisis support, and help students explore questions of meaning and purpose during their academic journey.

The cathedral has developed a specialized campus ministry initiative called Meditation and Justice through its Center for Spiritual Imagination. This program integrates contemplative practices with social justice education, curating campus-wide public events and cultivating spaces for contemplative practice and meaningful dialogue. The chaplains provide one-on-one mentoring and spiritual direction to students, while also connecting them with service opportunities that allow them to live out their spiritual values through "hearing the cry of the poor and the cry of the earth."

The Meditation and Justice program encourages students to identify sacred experiences in their daily lives, articulate their desire for meaningful existence, and process anxieties related to contemporary social and ecological challenges. Students receive spiritual tools drawn from Christian contemplative traditions and are empowered to become campus leaders while developing committed responses to justice issues. The program emphasizes connecting students with faith community and supporting them in discovering their vocation as "healers, reconcilers, and ambassadors of God in the world."

== Center for Spiritual Imagination ==
The Center for Spiritual Imagination is a ministry of the Cathedral, dedicated to teaching contemplative practice for just living. Founded in 2020, the center operates within a spiritual ecology characterized by ancient rhythms, community nurturing, and a focus on justice work. Deeply rooted in the church, our Episcopal Visitor is the Bishop of Long Island.

The Center for Spiritual Imagination is a spiritual organization operated by the Community of the Incarnation.

The center particularly focuses on serving individuals who identify as "Spiritual But Not Religious," a demographic the organization describes as being open to Christian spiritual practices while often finding institutional religion incompatible with their spiritual growth. The center frames its work as part of reimagining how Christian communities might organize and develop in response to declining institutional Christianity in America.

The organization offers various experiences, programs, and services designed to integrate spiritual practice with social justice advocacy and community engagement.

=== History ===
The Center for Spiritual Imagination was established in 2020 as part of the Cathedral of the Incarnation's ministry within the Episcopal Diocese of Long Island. Its founding members are Michael T. Sniffen, Dean of the Cathedral; Morgan Mercer-Ladd, former Sub Dean of the Cathedral; Adam Bucko, Director of the Center for Spiritual Imagination, and Kris Vieira Coleman, Program Director of the Center for Spiritual Imagination.

The center's work is rooted in a spiritual ecology that maintains an ancient rhythm while remaining committed to nurturing community and pursuing justice in the world. This approach integrates contemplative practices with social action.

The organization describes its approach as rooted in "spiritual ecology" with an emphasis on community building and social justice work. The center positions itself as serving those at the margins of traditional church structures, welcoming seekers, doubters, and religious practitioners regardless of denominational affiliation.

=== Programs ===
The Community of the Incarnation - The center's major program is a three-year formation program for a New Monastic community called the Community of the Incarnation. This program prepares members to live according to a Rule of Life that emphasizes a daily rhythm of prayer, ongoing conversion of life, and a commitment to live spirituality in response to "the cry of the poor and the cry of the earth."

Those called to vowed membership in the Community undergo a comprehensive formation process that includes discernment, spiritual formation, monastic immersion, and theological study before being invited to take seasonal vows and commit to "ongoing conversion of life," which may eventually lead to permanent vows. The formation program emphasizes contemplative practice, theological education, and spiritual direction, particularly addressing challenges in prayer life and the importance of mentorship. The community structure includes accountability and mutual support systems among members. The formation process integrates contemplative practices with social action and justice work, while emphasizing celebration and joy as elements of spiritual life.

Public Programs - The center's public programs have attracted thousands of participants and include:

- Spiritual Imagination Speaker Series - featuring notable guests such as Richard Rohr, Lerita Coleman Brown, and John Thatamanil
- Socially Engaged Mysticism - courses exploring the intersection of contemplative practice and social justice
- Black Lives and Contemplation - programming addressing racial justice through a contemplative lens

== Verger ministry ==
As the diocesan cathedral and "Mother Church" of the Diocese of Long Island, the Cathedral of the Incarnation hosts numerous diocesan events throughout the year and maintains a large verger corps that serves these liturgical functions and provides ceremonial support for major diocesan occasions. The Dean's Verger heads the verger corps and is a member of the cathedral's professional staff, with the Sub Dean's Verger, Wedding Verger, and several duty vergers being drawn from volunteers within the congregation.

=== Vergers' Guild of the Episcopal Church - Diocese of Long Island Chapter ===
The Cathedral of the Incarnation serves as the headquarters for the Long Island Chapter of the Vergers' Guild of the Episcopal Church (VGEC). The chapter was recently established in the Diocese of Long Island and takes its motto from the last sermon preached by Saint David: "Be joyful, keep the faith, do the little things."

The Long Island Chapter functions as a center of education and professional development for vergers throughout the diocese and the wider church. Vergers at the cathedral and within the diocesan chapter fulfill traditional roles that have evolved over centuries, including assisting clergy in liturgical planning, training other liturgical ministers such as altar servers, crucifers, torch bearers, lectors and ushers, managing church property, and serving as liturgical coordinators during services. Contemporary responsibilities have expanded to include assisting with live-streaming technology and enhanced visitor welcome ministries.

The chapter offers periodic educational workshops covering various aspects of verger ministry and maintains eligibility requirements for members to serve at diocesan events held at the cathedral. The verger ministry at the cathedral emphasizes service, attention to detail, and typically draws from individuals with prior experience in other liturgical roles within the Episcopal Church.

== Stewart Historic Buildings Preservation Fund ==
The Stewart Historic Buildings Preservation Fund is a preservation initiative dedicated to maintaining the architectural legacy of Alexander T. Stewart and Cornelia Stewart in Garden City, New York. The fund focuses primarily on the Cathedral of the Incarnation, along with several other historically significant structures within the adjacent to it that share a historic link to the cathedral.

The organization aims to preserve both the physical structures and the cultural heritage they represent for future generations. The Bishop of Long Island, the Dean of the Cathedral, the Cathedral Chancellor, and the Cathedral Treasurer serve on the board of the fund.

=== Properties supported ===
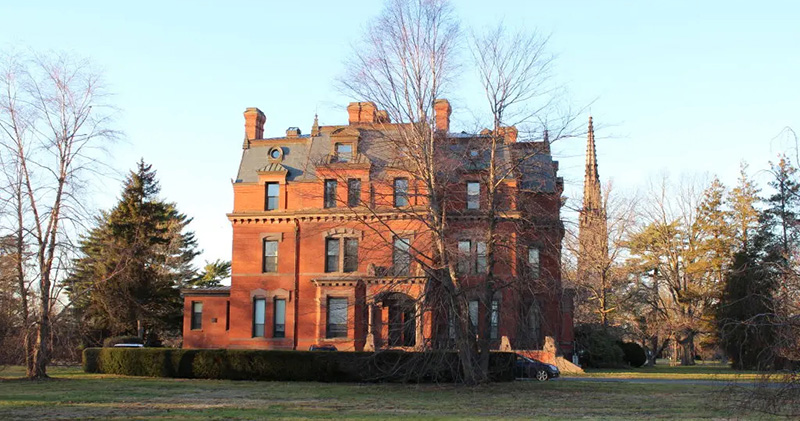
See House, the historic residence of the Bishops of Long Island, now houses the Office of the Dean, cathedral lay and clergy offices, as well as the Diocesan Finance and Real Estate offices.

The fund maintains several key historic structures, in addition to the Cathedral of the Incarnation, its primary focus:

- See House (36 Cathedral Avenue): A historic residence that houses the Office of the Dean, cathedral clergy and lay staff, and the diocesan Finance and Real Estate offices.
- The Carriage House (71 4th Street): A contributing structure within the A.T. Stewart Era Historic District, representing the architectural cohesion of Stewart's planned community development. The Carriage House is located slightly west of See House and was renamed the Newby Carriage House in 2025 by Bishop Lawrence Provenzano recognizing the 50 years' service of Diocesan Director of Facilities Stewart Newby whose family lived in the house for many years.

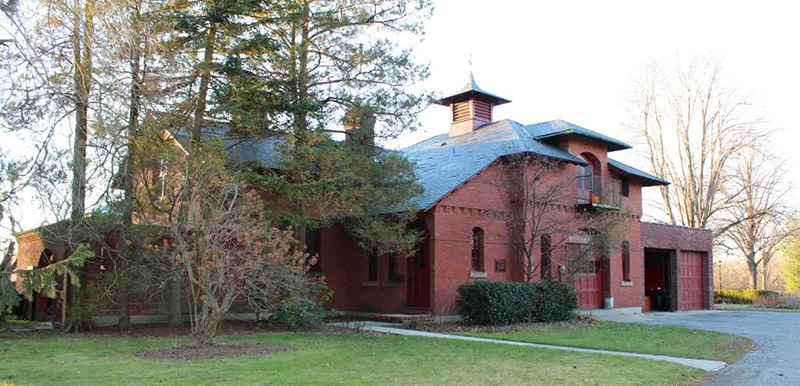
The Newby Carriage House

The Carriage House (71 4th Street): A contributing structure within the A.T. Stewart Era Historic District, representing the architectural cohesion of Stewart's planned community development. The Carriage House is located to the west of See House on the Cathedral Close and was renamed the Newby Carriage House in 2024 by Bishop Lawrence Provenzano, recognizing the 50 years' service of Diocesan Director of Facilities Stewart Newby whose family lived in the house for many years.

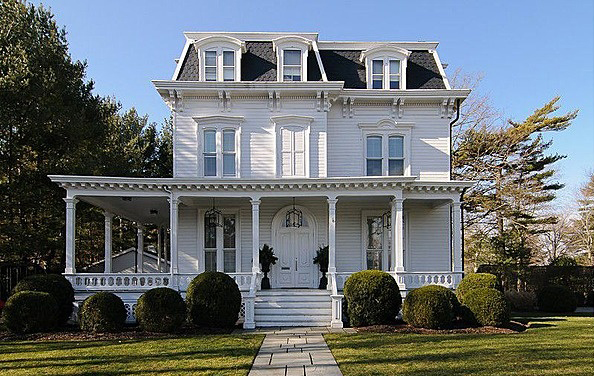
The Deanery at 32 Cathedral Avenue

Apostle House (32 Cathedral Avenue): One of the original "Apostle Houses" constructed during Stewart's era, exemplifying the Victorian architectural style characteristic of Garden City. This property now serves as the Deanery.

== See also ==
- List of the Episcopal cathedrals of the United States
- List of cathedrals in the United States
