= Robert Herbert Mize Sr. =

American prelate (1870–1956)

The Right Reverend Robert Herbert Mize Sr.
- Missionary Bishop of Salina
- Church: Episcopal Church
- See: Salina
- Elected: 1920
- In office: 1921–1938
- Predecessor: John C. Sage
- Successor: Shirley Hall Nichols

Orders
- Ordination: June 10, 1897 (deacon); December 17, 1897 (priest) by Frank Rosebrook Millspaugh
- Consecration: January 19, 1921 by Daniel S. Tuttle

Personal details
- Born: February 10, 1870 Chicago, Illinois, United States
- Died: April 1, 1956 (aged 86) Yuma, Arizona, United States
- Denomination: Anglican
- Parents: Edward Augustus Mize & Caroline Silliman
- Spouse: Margaret Talman Moore (m. 1903; died 1923)
- Children: 3, inc. Bob Mize

Robert Herbert Mize Sr. (February 10, 1870 – April 1, 1956) was an American prelate of the Episcopal Church who was the third Missionary Bishop of Salina between 1921 and 1938.

== Early life and education ==
Mize was born in Chicago on February 10, 1870, the son of Edward Augustus Mize and Caroline Silliman. He then grew up in Atchison, Kansas where he attended high school. He studied at St Stephen's College in New York City, graduating with a Bachelor of Arts in 1894. The college also awarded him a Doctor of Divinity in 1921. He then went on to study at the General Theological Seminary and graduated in 1897. The seminary also awarded him a Doctor of Sacred Theology in 1923. He married Margaret Talman Moore on June 10, 1903, and together had three children. One of his children was Bob Mize who was the Bishop of Damaraland, of what is the present day Namibia.

== Ordained ministry ==
Mize was ordained deacon on June 10, 1897, and priest on December 17, 1897, on both occasions by Bishop Frank Rosebrook Millspaugh of Kansas. He initially served as rector of St John's Church in Hiawatha, Kansas between 1897 and 1898, and then from 1898 until 1906 he was rector of St. John's Military School in Salina, Kansas. In 1906 he became rector of St Andrew's Church in Emporia, Kansas, while in 1912 he transferred to St Paul's Church in Kansas City, Kansas to serve as its rector. He remained there until 1921. He was active in the Diocese of Kansas, was a member of the standing committee, and served as deputy to each general convention between 1910 and 1920.

== Episcopacy ==
Mize was elected Missionary Bishop of Salina in 1920 and was consecrated on January 19, 1921, in Grace Cathedral by Presiding Bishop Daniel S. Tuttle. He remained in office until his retirement in 1938. He died on Easter Day, April 1, 1956, in Yuma, Arizona.
