= Michael Pierce Milliken =

Fifth bishop of the Episcopal Diocese of Western Kansas

The Right Reverend Michael Pierce Milliken
- Bishop of Western Texas
- Church: Episcopal Church
- Diocese: Western Texas
- Elected: August 21, 2010
- In office: 2011-2018
- Predecessor: James M. Adams Jr.
- Successor: Mark A. Cowell

Orders
- Ordination: November 30, 1973
- Consecration: February 19, 2011 by Katharine Jefferts Schori

Personal details
- Born: March 13, 1947 (age 79) Lexington, Kentucky, United States
- Denomination: Anglican
- Spouse: Kathleen Smith (m. 1969)
- Children: 1

Michael Pierce Milliken (born March 13, 1947) was the fifth bishop of the Episcopal Diocese of Western Kansas from 2011 until 2018.

== Biography ==
Milliken was born on March 13, 1947, in Lexington, Kentucky. He studied at the University of Kentucky from where he graduated with a Bachelor of Arts in 1970. Later he also attended the and Berkeley Divinity School and the Episcopal Theological Seminary in Kentucky from where he graduated in 1973 with a Master of Divinity. He also studied for a Master of Arts in Theology at Xavier University, which he earned in 1993.

He was ordained deacon on May 26, 1973, and then priest on November 30, 1973. Between 1973 and 1977 he served as vicar of St Matthew's Church before becoming rector of Grace Church in Florence, Kentucky, a position he held until 1998. He then became rector of Grace Church in Hutchinson, Kansas.

On August 21, 2010, Milliken was elected on the second ballot as Bishop of Western Kansas and was consecrated on February 19, 2011. He retained the rectorship of Grace Church in Hutchinson for the first three years of his bishopric. He was succeeded by Mark Cowell on December 1, 2018, ending his term. He was serving as the Assisting Bishop of the Episcopal Diocese of Kansas from the retirement of Bishop Dean Wolfe until the consecration of Cathleen Chittenden Bascom as the 10th Bishop of the Episcopal Diocese of Kansas on March 2, 2019. He married Kathleen Smith on August 2, 1969, and together have one son.

== See also ==
- List of Episcopal bishops of the United States
- Historical list of the Episcopal bishops of the United States
