= Millspaugh =

Millspaugh is a surname. Notable people with the surname include:

- Arthur Millspaugh (1883–1955), adviser at the U.S. State Department's Office of the Foreign Trade
- Charles Frederick Millspaugh (1854–1923), American botanist
- Frank Millspaugh (disambiguation):
  - Frank C. Millspaugh (1872–1947), U.S. Representative from Missouri
  - Frank Rosebrook Millspaugh (1848–1916), bishop of Kansas

== See also ==
- Millspaugh, California, unincorporated community in Inyo County, California
