= Matthew Heyd =

American bishop

The Right Reverend Matthew Foster Heyd
- 17th Bishop of New York
- Church: Episcopal Church
- Diocese: New York
- In office: 2024−present
- Predecessor: Andrew M. L. Dietsche
- Previous posts: Bishop coadjutor of New York (2023−2024); Rector, Church of the Heavenly Rest, New York (2013−2023)

Orders
- Ordination: 2009 by Mark Sisk
- Consecration: 20 May 2023 by Michael Curry

Personal details
- Denomination: Anglican
- Spouse: Ann Thornton
- Children: 2

Matthew Foster Heyd is an American prelate who has served as the 17th Episcopal bishop of New York since 2024. He was consecrated as bishop co-adjutor in 2023, having previously served for 10 years as rector of the Church of the Heavenly Rest in New York City.

== Education ==
After graduating from Providence Day School in Charlotte, North Carolina, Heyd studied at the University of North Carolina at Chapel Hill, where he was a Morehead scholar. Later he earned a Master of Arts in religion from Yale University in 1995 and a Master of Sacred Theology from the General Theological Seminary in 2009.

== Career ==
Heyd was ordained to the diaconate and priesthood in 2009 by the Right Rev. Mark Sisk, Bishop of New York, and served at Trinity Church on Wall Street, Manhattan, until being called as rector of the Church of the Heavenly Rest on the Upper East Side of Manhattan in 2013.

On 3 December 2022, at a special election convention of the Diocese of New York at the Cathedral of St John the Divine, Heyd was declared bishop co-adjutor after four rounds of voting. He was consecrated as bishop co-adjutor on 20 May 2023, and was installed as the 17th Bishop of New York on 10 February 2024. He was the second rector of the Church of the Heavenly Rest to become Bishop of New York, after the Rev. Herbert Shipman who served as bishop from 1921 to 1930. His co-consecrators were the Presiding Bishop of the Episcopal Church, Michael Curry, along with Jennifer Baskerville-Burrows, Andrew Dietsche, Mary Glasspool, Catherine S. Roskam, Allen K. Shin and Mark Sisk.

Heyd is a board member of the Absalom Jones Center for Racial Healing in Atlanta, Georgia, Bard College and Episcopal Divinity School.

In 2026, Heyd refused to comment on the relationship between Bard College President Leon Botstein and financier and child sex offender Jeffrey Epstein.

== Controversies ==
=== Lawsuit concerning Saint Thomas Church ===
In 2025, Bishop Matthew Heyd was accused of retaliating against a parishioner who reported alleged sexual assaults at Saint Thomas Church, including by circulating allegedly false claims that the parishioner had assaulted church staff and threatened a mass shooting.

In September 2025, Heyd was named as a defendant in a civil lawsuit filed in the New York Supreme Court by a former parishioner of Saint Thomas Church Fifth Avenue. The plaintiff alleged that he had been sexually assaulted by individuals associated with the parish and that church and diocesan officials subsequently retaliated against him. The lawsuit accused Heyd of defamation, alleging that he had circulated false accusations that the plaintiff had assaulted church staff and threatened violence against the congregation. Heyd acknowledged the lawsuit and placed one of the accused priests, Rev. Mark Schultz, on administrative leave pending an independent investigation. In December 2025, Saint Thomas Church announced that an investigation conducted by the law firm Ropes & Gray had found no wrongdoing. The plaintiff subsequently withdrew the lawsuit with prejudice. The church's rector, Rev. Carl Turner, stated that no out-of-court settlement had been reached, and Schultz was restored to his duties.

=== Diocesan funding dispute ===
In November 2025, Heyd faced opposition from Trinity Church Wall Street over his proposal to reform the Episcopal Diocese of New York's funding system. The proposal, which was approved by nearly 80% of delegates at the diocesan convention, would more than double Trinity's annual financial contributions, making the parish responsible for approximately 62% of the diocese's annual budget. Trinity's rector, the Rev. Phillip Jackson, publicly opposed the changes, arguing that they would divert resources from charitable programs without addressing the diocese's structural financial problems. Jackson stated that Trinity would refuse to pay the increased assessment. Heyd defended the reforms as a means of distributing financial obligations more equitably among congregations and providing relief to smaller churches, including those previously excluded from diocesan assistance because of unpaid assessments.

=== Absalom Jones Center dispute ===
In 2023, Heyd resigned as chair of the advisory board of the Absalom Jones Center for Racial Healing in Atlanta amid disagreements over the center's leadership transition following the retirement of its executive director, Catherine Meeks. Meeks alleged that Atlanta Bishop Robert C. Wright had obstructed the search for her successor, including over disagreements concerning the proposed salary for the position. According to Meeks, Heyd resigned because the transition process was not progressing productively. Heyd declined to explain his resignation publicly but expressed continued support for Meeks and the center.

=== Bard College controversy ===
In 2026, Heyd, a member of the Bard College board of trustees, declined to comment publicly on revelations concerning college president Leon Botstein's relationship with convicted sex offender Jeffrey Epstein. The disclosures prompted criticism from students, faculty and alumni, and an independent investigation commissioned by the college's trustees. When contacted by the Albany Times Union in March 2026, Heyd's spokesperson initially suggested that he might comment, but subsequently stated that Heyd did not wish to discuss Botstein or Bard.

=== Theological controversy ===
In March 2026, Heyd presided over a service celebrating transgender identity at the Cathedral of St. John the Divine in New York City. During the service, the Rev. Flourish Klink delivered a sermon asserting that God was transgender and suggesting that Jesus Christ had undergone a transition through his resurrection. The sermon attracted criticism from traditional Christian commentators, who characterized its interpretation of Christian doctrine as heretical. Heyd served as celebrant at the service but did not deliver the sermon.

== Family ==
Heyd is married to Ann Thornton, vice-provost and librarian at Columbia University in New York City. They have one daughter and one son.

Episcopal Church (USA) titles
Preceded by Andrew M. L. Dietsche	Bishop of New York; 2024−present	Incumbent
