= Frank Millspaugh =

Frank Millspaugh may refer to:

- Frank C. Millspaugh (1872–1947), U.S. Representative from Missouri
- Frank Rosebrook Millspaugh (1848–1916), bishop of Kansas
