= Shirley Hall Nichols =

Bishop in Kansas

The Right Reverend Shirley Hall Nichols
- Missionary Bishop of Salina
- Church: Episcopal Church
- See: Salina
- Elected: 1943
- In office: 1943–1955
- Predecessor: Robert Herbert Mize Sr.
- Successor: Arnold Lewis
- Previous posts: Missionary Bishop of Kyoto (1926-1940); Acting Bishop of Salina (1940-1943)

Orders
- Ordination: June 2, 1912 by John McKim
- Consecration: April 13, 1926 by John McKim

Personal details
- Born: February 10, 1870 Brooklyn, New York City, United States
- Died: April 1, 1956 (aged 86) New York City, New York, United States
- Denomination: Anglican
- Parents: Walter Nichols & Frances Russell Hall
- Spouse: Hasu H. Gardiner (m. 1916)
- Children: 4

Shirley Hall Nichols (September 26, 1884 - February 25, 1964) was a missionary bishop of The Episcopal Church in Japan from 1926 until 1940, and later of Salina between 1943 and 1955.

== Early life and education ==
Nichols was born in Brooklyn, New York City on September 26, 1884 to Walter Nichols and Frances Russell Hall. He was educated in the public schools of Montclair, New Jersey, and then attended Harvard University from where he graduated with a Bachelor of Arts in 1905. He then studied at the General Theological Seminary from where he earned a Bachelor of Sacred Theology in 1911 and awarded a Doctor of Sacred Theology in 1928. He married Hasu H. Gardiner on June 20, 1916 and together had four children.

== Ordained ministry ==
Nichols was ordained deacon on May 18, 1911 by Bishop Edwin Stevens Lines of Newark at St James' Church in Upper Montclair, New Jersey. He immediately left as a missionary in Japan where he was assigned to teach at St Paul's University in Tokyo. He was then ordained priest on June 2, 1912 by the Bishop of North Tokyo John McKim. He served most of his priesthood ministering in Hirosaki, Aomori, and Ōdate from 1914 until 1926.

== Episcopacy ==
He was elected Missionary Bishop of Kyoto and consecrated on April 13, 1926. He remained in office until 1940 when he was forced to leave Japan during WWII. Upon his arrival in the United States, he was appointed Acting Bishop of Salina and served in that position until his confirmation as Missionary Bishop of Salina in 1943. He retained the post until his retirement in 1955. He died of cancer at St. Luke's Hospital in New York City on February 25, 1964.
