= Christ Hospital =

Christ Hospital may refer to:

== Healthcare institution ==
- The Christ Hospital, in Cincinnati, Ohio
- Christ Hospital, Jersey City, New Jersey
- Christ's Hospital in Topeka, Kansas; now Stormont–Vail HealthCare
- Advocate Christ Medical Center, in Oak Lawn, Illinois

== School ==
- Christ's Hospital, an English independent day and boarding school in West Sussex, England
- Lincoln Christ's Hospital School, a state secondary school with academy status in Lincoln, Lincolnshire, England.

== Transport ==
- Christ's Hospital railway station, a railway station serving the school of the same name in West Sussex

== Charity ==
- Christ's Hospital of Abingdon, a charity based in Abingdon, England
