= James H. Wise (bishop) =

Scottish bishop (1875–1939)

The Right Reverend James Wise
- Bishop of Kansas
- Church: Episcopal Church
- Diocese: Kansas
- Elected: September 19, 1916
- In office: 1916–1939
- Predecessor: Frank Rosebrook Millspaugh
- Successor: Goodrich R. Fenner
- Previous post: Coadjutor Bishop of Kansas (1916)

Orders
- Ordination: June 8, 1902 by George Worthington
- Consecration: October 28, 1916 by Daniel S. Tuttle

Personal details
- Born: July 26, 1875 Dundee, Scotland
- Died: July 8, 1939 (aged 63) Wichita, Kansas, United States
- Buried: Grace Cathedral
- Denomination: Anglican
- Parents: Robert Wise & Mary Rattray
- Spouse: Anna Marie Betts (m. 1902)
- Children: 2

James Wise (July 26, 1875 – July 8, 1939) was the fourth diocesan bishop of Kansas in The Episcopal Church, serving from 1916 to 1939.

== Early life and education ==
Wise was born on July 26, 1875, in Dundee, Scotland, to Robert Wise and Mary Rattray. He studied at the University of Nebraska between 1896 and 1898 and then at the General Theological Seminary, graduating in 1901. General also awarded him an honorary Doctor of Divinity in 1918, Hobart College a Doctor of Sacred Theology in 1917, while Washburn College awarded him a Doctor of Law in 1918.

== Ordained ministry ==
Wise was ordained deacon on June 16, 1901, and priest on June 8, 1902, by Bishop George Worthington of Nebraska. He initially served as Missionary in Charge of St Clement's Church in South Omaha, Nebraska, and Holy Cross Church in Papillion, Nebraska, between 1900 and 1902. Later, he became rector of St Martin's Church in South Omaha, serving between 1902 and 1909. In 1909, he transferred to St. Louis, Missouri to become the rector of the Church of the Holy Communion, where he remained until 1916.

== Episcopacy ==
In May 1916, Wise was elected as the coadjutor bishop of Texas, however, he declined the election. When the Special Convention of the Diocese of Kansas met in Grace Cathedral on September 19, 1916, Wise was elected Coadjutor of Kansas on the seventh ballot. This time, he accepted the election. He was consecrated on October 28, 1916, at the Church of the Holy Communion where he had served as rector, by Presiding Bishop Daniel S. Tuttle. He succeeded as diocesan upon the death of Bishop Millspaugh on November 22, 1916. His episcopacy convinced with a number of significant world events, notably WWI and the Great Depression, that changed the face of the diocese and its population. He died in office on July 8, 1939, while on a visit to the parish church of St James in Wichita, Kansas.

== Personal life ==
Wise married Anna Marie Betts on December 31, 1902. They had two sons, Arthur who died in infancy in 1904, and James Llewellyn who died when he was seven years old during the influenza epidemic.
