= Samuel Bowman =

American bishop (1800–1861)

The Right Reverend Samuel Bowman D.D.
- Suffragan Bishop of Pennsylvania
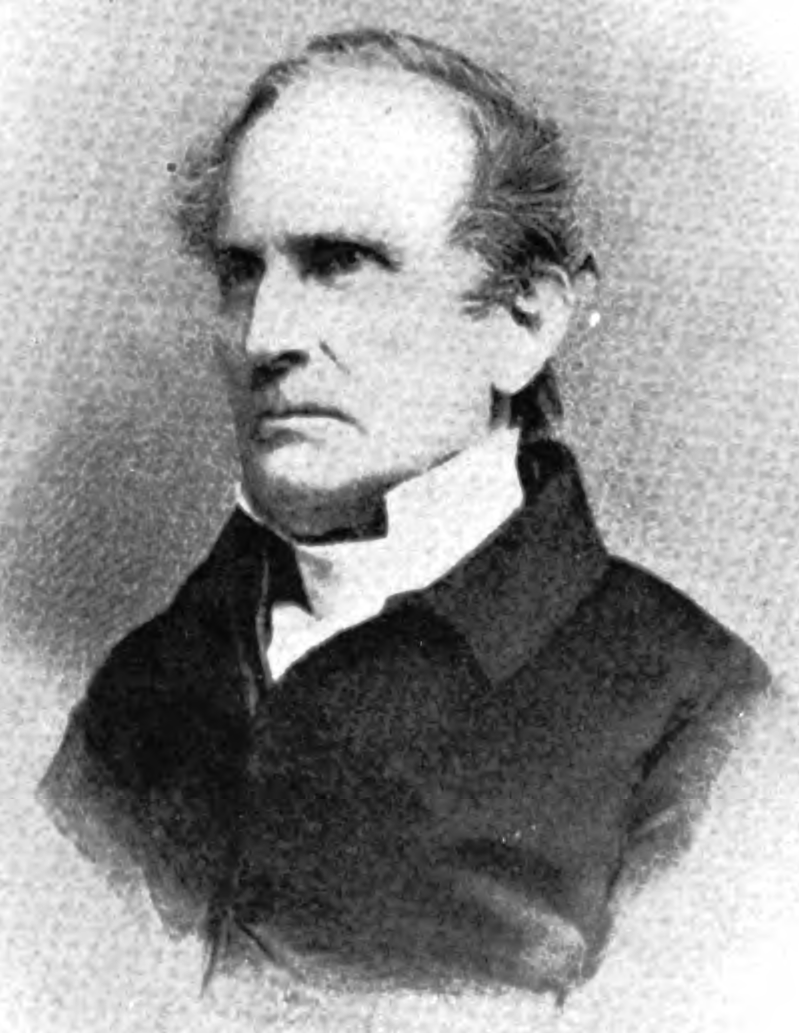
- Church: Episcopal Church
- Diocese: Pennsylvania
- Elected: May 28, 1858
- In office: 1858–1861
- Successor: William Bacon Stevens

Orders
- Ordination: December 19, 1824 by William White
- Consecration: August 25, 1858 by Jackson Kemper

Personal details
- Born: May 21, 1800 Wilkes-Barre, Pennsylvania, United States
- Died: August 3, 1861 (aged 61) Pennsylvania, United States
- Buried: St James Church, Lancaster, Pennsylvania
- Denomination: Anglican
- Parents: Samuel Bowman & Eleanor Ledlie
- Children: 3

Samuel Bowman (May 21, 1800 – August 3, 1861) was an American suffragan Episcopal Bishop of Pennsylvania, United States.

== Early life and family ==
Bowman was born in Wilkes-Barre, Pennsylvania, the son of Samuel Bowman, a captain in the Continental Army, and his wife, Eleanor Ledlie. He was educated at the Academy of Wilkes-Barre and, while he was initially inclined toward the practice of law, Bowman soon changed his studies toward the church. His theological instruction was conducted by Bishop William White. White ordained Bowman deacon in 1823, and he was ordained priest the following year, also by White. After his ordination to the priesthood, Bowman took charge of two parishes in Lancaster County. In 1825, he became rector of Trinity Church in Easton, Pennsylvania. He returned to Lancaster in 1827 to serve at St. James Church in that town, assisting the rector there until his death in 1830, at which time Bowman became rector. While there, Bowman earned a doctorate in divinity from his Geneva College (now Hobart and William Smith Colleges).

Bowman married twice. The Rev. William Augustus Muhlenberg officiated at his first marriage to Susan Sitgreaves in Trinity Church, Easton. They had three children, one of whom died young. His son, Samuel Sitgreaves Bowman, graduated from Yale University in 1845 and studied law in Philadelphia, but died unmarried, predeceasing his father in 1848. Bowman's daughter, Ellen Ledlie Bowman, survived her father and died in 1894 in Topeka, Kansas, having married Thomas H. Vail, the Episcopal Bishop of Kansas, in 1867. After Susan died in 1831, Bowman married Harriet Clarkson, the daughter of the previous rector of St. James, Lancaster. Bowman's brother, Alexander Hamilton Bowman, was Superintendent of the United States Military Academy at West Point, New York during the American Civil War.

== Ministry at St. James Lancaster (1827-1861) ==
Bowman was a moderate High Churchman with the heart of an evangelist. Under his leadership the congregation grew, requiring the 1820 church building to be enlarged in 1844. Working in partnership with prominent men and women, he oversaw the founding of the St. James' Orphan Asylum (1838); St. James' Parochial School (1848); the Church Home for sick and indigent parishioners (1850), later known as Bishop Bowman Church Home; St. John's Lancaster (1853), the first free church in the diocese of Pennsylvania; and the Yeates Institute (1857), a boys' preparatory school, endowed by the daughter of Jasper Yeates. The Parochial School attracted as instructors Henry Augustus Coit, Daniel Kendig and John Williamson who later were ordained and had distinguished careers.

Bowman contributed to local education beyond the parish. He served on the local school board and was the president of the short-lived Abbeyville Institute. He was a member of Franklin College's Committee of Supervision from 1840 and "was for some years president of the college in all but name." Bowman working in partnership with the Hon. James Buchanan was instrumental in the successful negotiations which created Franklin and Marshall College in 1853. When Buchanan became president of the new board, Bowman served as a vice-president.

== Coadjutor bishop ==
In 1845, the clergy elected him Bishop of Pennsylvania, but when the laity refused to concur, Bowman acquiesced in the nomination of Alonzo Potter, who was eventually chosen. In 1847, Bowman was elected Bishop of Indiana, but he declined the appointment, preferring to remain in Lancaster. Bowman was consecrated a suffragan Bishop of Pennsylvania in 1858, and this appointment he accepted. He was the 64th bishop in the ECUSA, and was consecrated in Christ Church, Philadelphia, by Bishops Jackson Kemper, William Heathcote DeLancey, and Alfred Lee. Bowman threw himself immediately into his work, but his episcopate was brief. While visiting the western part of Pennsylvania in 1861 on the Allegheny Valley Railroad, a landslide wrecked a railroad bridge, causing the passengers, including Bowman, to walk several miles. Bowman lingered behind, and was later found dead along the tracks, either of apoplexy or a heart attack.
