= William E. Smalley =

The Right Reverend William E. Smalley
- Bishop of Kansas
- Church: Episcopal Church
- Diocese: Kansas
- Elected: 1989
- In office: 1989-2003
- Predecessor: Richard F. Grein
- Successor: Dean E. Wolfe

Orders
- Ordination: March 5, 1966 by Frederick J. Warnecke
- Consecration: December 8, 1989 by Edmond L. Browning

Personal details
- Born: April 8, 1940 (age 86) New Brunswick, New Jersey, United States
- Denomination: Anglican
- Parents: August H. Smalley, Emma Gleason
- Spouse: Carole

William Edward Smalley (born April 8, 1940) was the eighth bishop of the Episcopal Diocese of Kansas from 1989 to 2003.

== Biography ==
Smalley was born on April 8, 1940, in New Brunswick, New Jersey, the son of August H. Smalley (1895-1947) and Emma Gleason (1901-1985). After attending public schools in New Jersey and Pennsylvania, he studied at Lehigh University where he graduated with a Bachelor of Arts in 1962, and then the Episcopal Divinity School where he earned his Master of Divinity in 1965. He also graduated with a Master of Education from Temple University in 1970, and a Doctor of Ministry from the Wesley Theological Seminary in 1987.

Smalley was ordained to deacon in June 1965 by the Bishop Frederick J. Warnecke of Bethlehem, and then priest on March 5, 1966, by the same prelate. He served as vicar of St Peter's Church in Plymouth, Pennsylvania, and vicar of St Martin-in-the-Fields Church in Nuangola, Pennsylvania, between 1965 and 1967. From 1967 to 1980 Smalley served in a variety of roles, including two years as rector of All Saints Church in Lehighton, Pennsylvania, and then as Federal Program Coordinator for the Lehighton Area School District. He returned as rector of All Saints and worked to develop a cluster ministry. Prior to his election, he was serving as rector of Ascension Church in Gaithersburg, Maryland. He was consecrated on December 8, 1989, at Grace Cathedral with Presiding Bishop Edmond L. Browning as chief consecrator. He retired on December 31, 2003, and served for six months at St Philip’s Church in Topeka, Kansas.

== See also ==
- List of bishops of the Episcopal Church in the United States of America
