= Goodrich R. Fenner =

American bishop (1891–1966)

The Right Reverend Goodrich Robert Fenner
- Bishop of Kansas
- Church: Episcopal Church
- Diocese: Kansas
- Elected: May 9, 1937
- In office: 1939-1959
- Predecessor: James H. Wise
- Successor: Edward Clark Turner
- Previous post: Coadjutor Bishop of Kansas (1937-1939)

Orders
- Ordination: November 12, 1916 by William Theodotus Capers
- Consecration: September 29, 1937 by James H. Wise

Personal details
- Born: August 12, 1891 Beeville, Texas, United States
- Died: February 14, 1966 (aged 74) Highland Park, Texas
- Buried: Grace Cathedral
- Denomination: Anglican
- Parents: Robert Willis Fenner & Kate Elliott Fenner
- Spouse: Julia Hogan (m. 1930)
- Education: Texas Agricultural and Mechanical College; General Theological Seminary

Goodrich Robert Fenner (August 12, 1891 – February 14, 1966) was the fifth bishop of Kansas in The Episcopal Church between 1939 and 1959.

== Early life and education ==
Fenner was born on August 2, 1891, in Beeville, Texas, the son of Robert Willis Fenner and Kate Elliott Fenner. He was one of a family of six sons and three daughters. Fenner studied at the Texas Agricultural and Mechanical College, graduating with a Bachelor of Science in civil engineering in 1913. He also undertook studies at the General Theological Seminary from where he earned a Bachelor of Sacred Theology in 1916, a Master of Sacred Theology in 1934, and an honorary Doctor of Sacred Theology in 1938.

== Ordained ministry ==
Fenner was ordained deacon on May 7, 1916, by the coadjutor bishop of Virginia Arthur Selden Lloyd for the Diocese of West Texas and then priest by Bishop William Theodotus Capers of West Texas on November 12, 1916, at St Philip's Church, Uvalde, Texas. He served as rector of St Philip's Church in Uvalde between 1916 and 1924 and then rector of Christ Church in Dallas, Texas, between 1924 and 1932. He also served as chaplain in the United States Army in 1918. In 1932 he was appointed secretary to the Rural division of the National Council Episcopal Church, a post he retained until 1935 when he became rector of St Andrew's Church in Kansas City, Missouri.

== Bishop ==
Fenner was elected Coadjutor Bishop of Kansas on the first ballot by the diocesan convention which met on May 9, 1937, at Grace Church in Chanute, Kansas. He was consecrated bishop in Grace Cathedral on September 29, 1937, by Bishop James H. Wise of Kansas. He then succeeded as diocesan on July 8, 1939, after the sudden death of Bishop Wise. During his episcopacy new congregations were established and university chaplaincies at the University of Kansas and at Kansas State University came into being. Fenner retired in 1959 and died of a heart attack in 1966.
