= John Ashby =

John Ashby may refer to:

- John Ashby (Royal Navy officer) (1646–1693), admiral
- John Ashby (militiaman) (1707–1789), colonel in the Virginia Militia
- John F. Ashby (1929–2001), bishop of the Episcopal Diocese of Western Kansas
