= William Davidson (bishop) =

Bishop of the Episcopal Diocese of Western Kansas

The Right Reverend William Davidson
- Bishop of Western Texas
- Church: Episcopal Church
- Diocese: Western Texas
- Elected: September 1965
- In office: 1966–1980
- Predecessor: Arnold Lewis
- Successor: John F. Ashby

Orders
- Ordination: August 23, 1946 (deacon); April 25, 1947 (priest) by Henry H. Daniels
- Consecration: January 6, 1966 by John E. Hines

Personal details
- Born: July 20, 1919 Miles City, Montana, United States
- Died: May 8, 2006 (aged 86) Loveland, Colorado, United States
- Denomination: Anglican
- Spouse: Mary Shoemaker (m. 1942)
- Children: 4

William Davidson (July 20, 1919 - May 8, 2006) was bishop of the Episcopal Diocese of Western Kansas, serving as diocesan from 1966 to 1980.

== Early life and education ==
Davidson was born on July 20, 1919, in Miles City, Montana. He studied at the Montana State University and graduated with a Bachelor of Arts in 1940. He then taught Vocational Agriculture in Sidney, Montana, until 1943 when he enrolled at Berkeley Divinity School to train for the priesthood. He earned a Bachelor of Sacred Theology in 1946. On June 3, 1942, he married Mary Shoemaker and together had four children. He was awarded an honorary Doctor of Divinity by Berkeley Divinity School in 1966, and an honorary Doctor of Laws from the Lexington Theological Seminary in 1978.

== Ordained ministry ==
Davidson was ordained deacon on August 23, 1946, in St Peter's Pro-Cathedral and then a priest on April 25, 1947, by the Bishop of Montana Henry H. Daniels. In 1946 he became vicar in charge of churches in Townsend, Montana, White Sulphur Springs, Montana, and Martinsdale, Montana, while in 1952 he became rector of St James’ Church in Lewistown, Montana. Between 1956 and 1962 he worked in the National Council of the Episcopal Church in New York City as Associate Secretary of the Division of Town and Country Work. In 1962 he returned to parish ministry and served as rector of Grace Church in Jamestown, North Dakota.

== Bishop ==
Davidson was elected Missionary Bishop of Western Texas in September 1965 and consecrated with John E. Hines as chief consecrator on January 6, 1966, at the auditorium of Mount Mary College in Salina, Kansas. On October 15, 1971, the Diocese of Western Texas was created and he became its first diocesan bishop. He held the post until his resignation on November 15, 1980. In May of that year he was named Assistant Bishop of Ohio and started in that role that November. He then retired from Ohio in 1986. After that he served as assistant bishop in a number of dioceses, notably Indianapolis, Central New York, Pennsylvania, Pittsburgh, Rio Grande and Colorado. He died on May 8, 2006, in Loveland, Colorado.
