= James M. Adams Jr. =

American bishop

The Right Reverend James M. Adams Jr.
- Bishop of Western Kansas
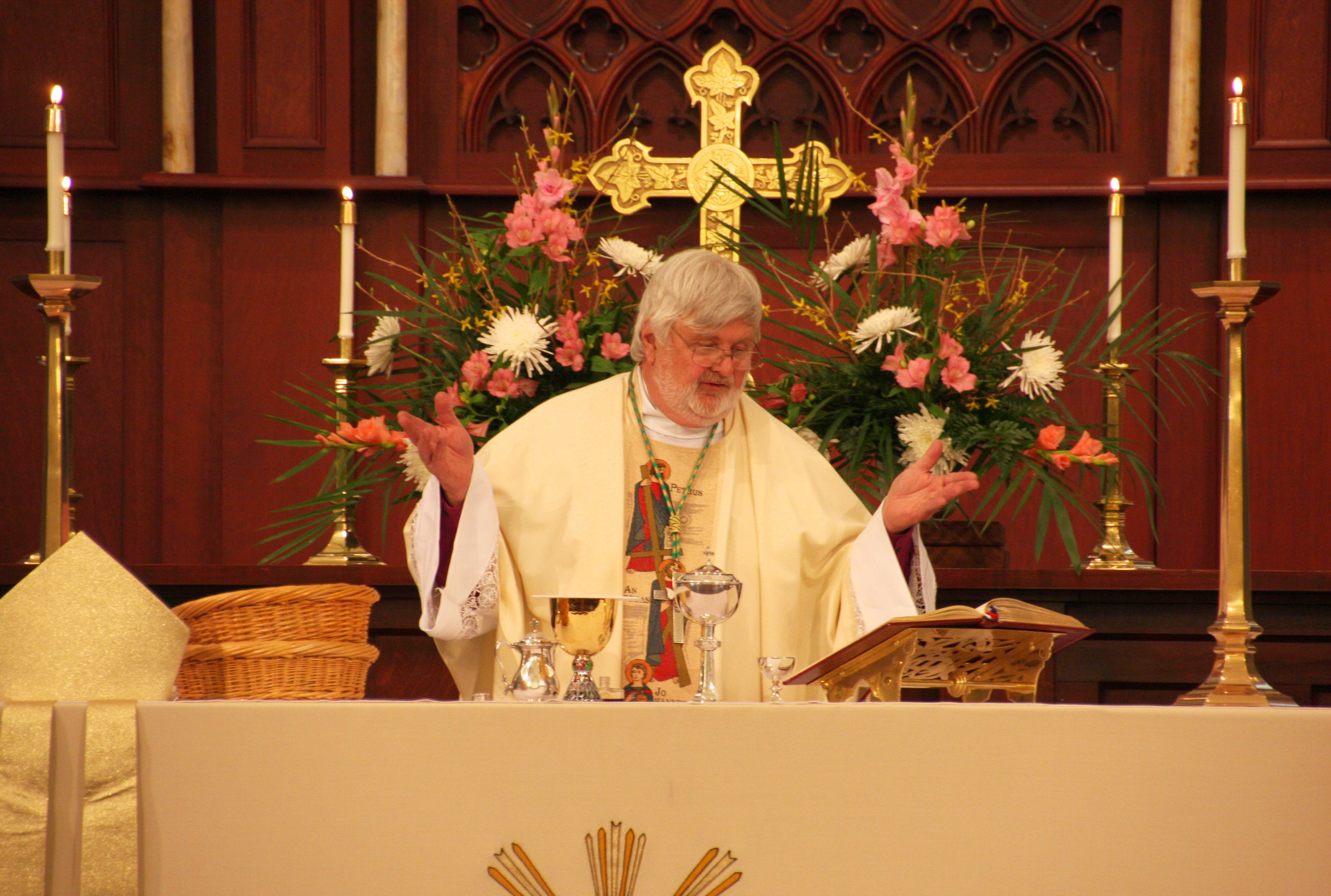
- Jim Adams in 2016
- Church: Episcopal Church
- Diocese: Western Kansas
- Elected: October 2001
- In office: 2002–2010
- Predecessor: Vernon E. Strickland
- Successor: Michael Pierce Milliken
- Previous posts: Rector of Shepherd of the Hills, Lecanto, Florida Rector of Trinity Episcopal, El Dorado, Kansas

Orders
- Ordination: May 1, 1980
- Consecration: March 16, 2002 by William E. Smalley

Personal details
- Born: June 9, 1948 (age 77) El Paso, Texas, United States

James Marshall Adams junior (called Jim; born June 9, 1948) was the fourth Bishop of Western Kansas.

== Biography ==
Adams was born in El Paso, Texas. In 1971 he graduated from the University of Texas at El Paso, where he earned a Bachelor of Science degree in Secondary Education with emphasis on mathematics and business. He married his wife, Stacy, in August 1971; they have one child. Receiving his Master of Divinity from the General Theological Seminary in 1979, he was ordained a deacon on August 6, 1979. He served at St. Michael & All Angels Church in Albuquerque, New Mexico, and was chaplain at the New Mexico State Girls School. He was then curate and later assistant rector of Church of the Holy Faith in Santa Fe.

He is currently a member of Communion Partners, an Episcopalian group which opposed the 77th General Episcopal Convention's decision to authorize the blessing of same-sex marriages in 2012. The measure to allow the blessing of same-sex unions won by a 111–41 vote with 3 abstentions.

Adams was ordained a priest on May 1, 1980, and elected fourth Bishop of Western Kansas in October 2001.

Episcopal Church (USA) titles
Preceded by Vernon E. Strickland	Bishop of Western Kansas; 2002–2009	Succeeded by Michael Pierce Milliken
