= Church of the Heavenly Rest =

Church in Manhattan, New York

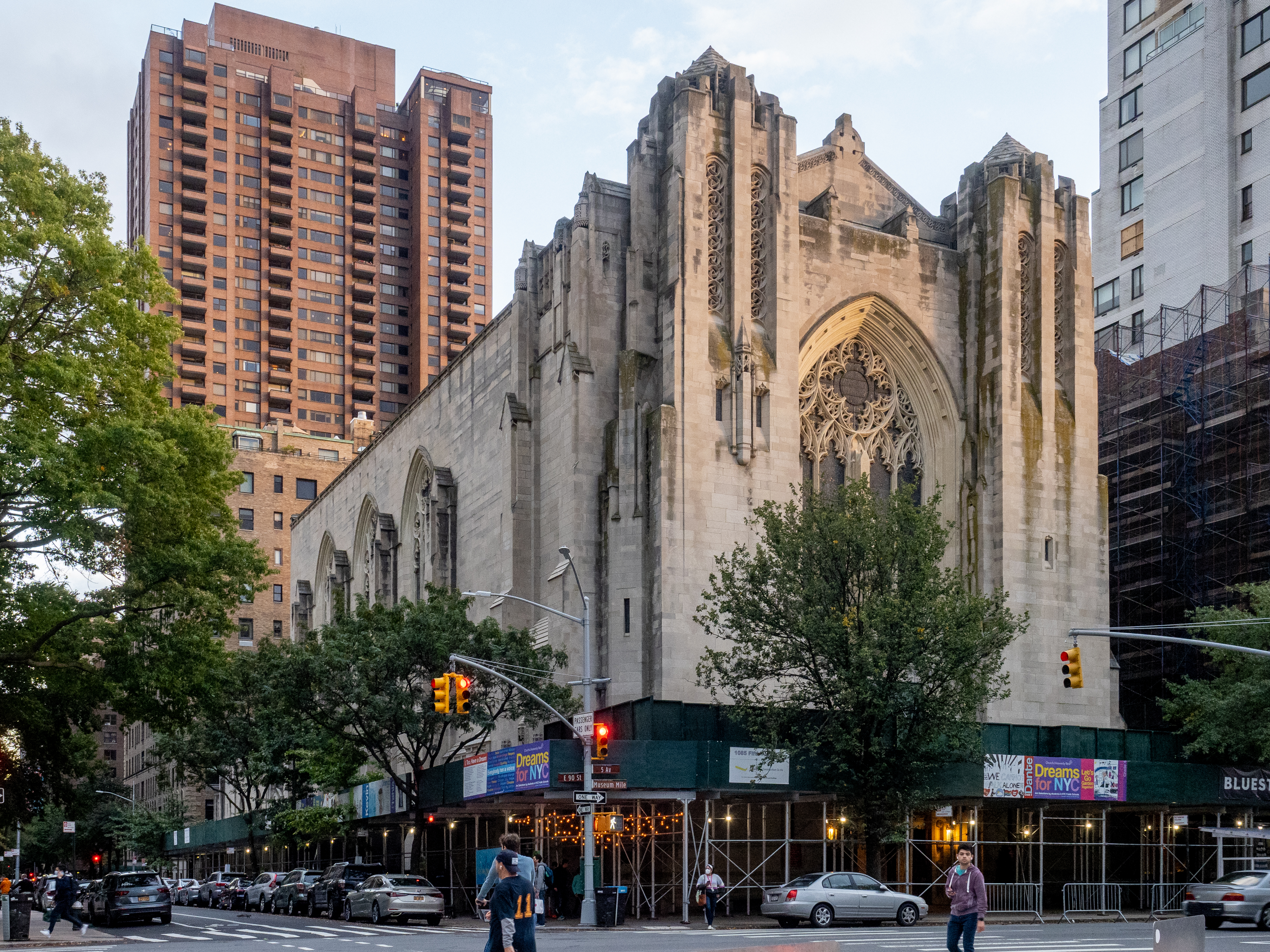
- Church of the Heavenly Rest
- Location: 1085 Fifth Avenue, Manhattan, New York
- Country: United States
- Denomination: Episcopal Church
- Website: heavenlyrest.org

History
- Founded: 1865

Architecture
- Heritage designation: National Register of Historic Places, 1921
- Architect: Mayers, Murray & Phillip
- Style: Neo-Gothic style
- Completed: 31 March 1929, Easter Sunday

Administration
- Diocese: Diocese of New York

Clergy
- Bishop: Matthew Heyd
- Rector: The Rev. Kate Malin
- The Church of the Heavenly Rest and the Chapel of the Beloved Disciple
- U.S. National Register of Historic Places
- New York State Register of Historic Places
- Location within Manhattan Location within New York City Location within New York Location within the United States
- Location: 1085 5th Ave., New York, New York
- Coordinates: 40°47′01″N 73°57′29″W
- Area: 0.6 acres (0.24 ha)
- NRHP reference No.: 100006215
- NYSRHP No.: 06101.000268 (church), 06101.008749 (parish house)

Significant dates
- Added to NRHP: March 3, 2021
- Designated NYSRHP: December 16, 2020

The Church of the Heavenly Rest is an Episcopal church located on the corner of Fifth Avenue and 90th Street, opposite Central Park and the Carnegie Mansion, on the Upper East Side of Manhattan in New York City. The church is noted for the architecture of its building, its location on Museum Mile, its outreach, music and arts programs, and some of its congregation members.

The church reported 1,833 members in 2025. It reported average Sunday attendance (ASA) of 208 in 2025. This was a relative decrease from ASA of 264 reported in 2019.

== History ==
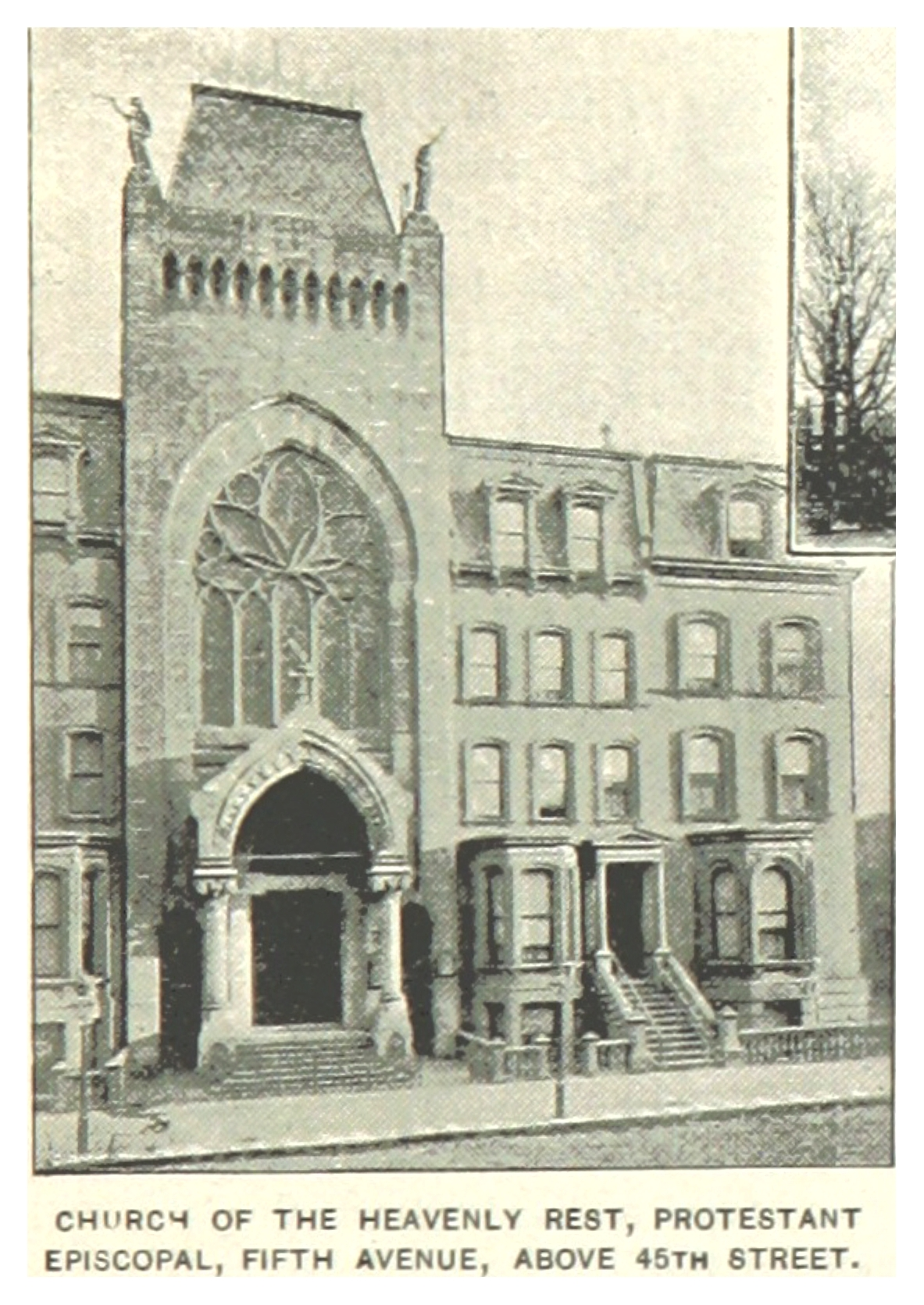
45th Street in the 1890s

The church was founded in 1865 (officially established in 1868) by American Civil War veterans, with the assistance of the Reverend Robert Shaw Howland. It was meant as a memorial to soldiers who had died in the Civil War. By 1900, the church had amassed close to 1000 members. The church was originally located on Fifth Avenue and 45th Street before moving to its present site.

=== Current site ===
The land for the current site was sold to the church in 1926 by Louise Whitfield Carnegie, Andrew Carnegie's widow. Carnegie purchased the site in 1917 for $1.7 million shortly after a sign was erected reading "for sale without restrictions"; his ownership prevented apartment house development there that would intrude on his mansion's surroundings, but the site remained undeveloped with only a few billboards and a lemonade stand on one of the city's most expensive addresses. Its subsequent sale to the church carried the restrictions that the land could only be used "for a Christian church no higher than 75 feet, exclusive of steeple" through 1975.

The limestone church was designed in the neo-Gothic style by the firm Mayers, Murray & Phillip, successors to Bertram Goodhue. Goodhue died before the first stone was laid. Mayers, Murray & Phillip took over construction. It opened on Easter 1929, seating 1,050, at a cost of $3.2 million. Sculpture was to be executed by Malvina Hoffman, Lee Lawrie, and other artists. The architecture and sculpture combined neo-Gothic styles with Art deco details. However, over two-thirds of the sculptural program was never executed; sculptor Janet Scudder withdrew from a commission in 1928 after it was downsized. The Stock Market Crash of 1929 ended other work, and the blocky limestone facade was retained without sculpture.

Innovative design features included unobstructed views of the altar, indirect lighting and a high-tech sound system. The building was listed on the National Register of Historic Places in 2021.

=== Music program ===
The church has a number of choirs, including boys' and girls', a mixed adult choir, and a bell choir. For its patronal feast, which is All Saints' Day, the hymns "For All the Saints" and "I Sing a Song of the Saints of God" are commonly sung.

== Notable people ==
The funeral of Chester A. Arthur, former President of the United States, was held at the church in 1886, and the ashes of the actress Gloria Swanson were interred there in 1983.

=== Rectors ===
The following have served as Rectors of the Church of the Heavenly Rest:

- 1865−1887: The Rev. Robert Shaw Howland
- 1887−1907: The Rev. Parker Morgan
- 1907−1921: The Rev. Herbert Shipman
- 1922−1949: The Rev. Henry Darlington
- 1950−1961: The Rev. John Ellis Large
- 1962−1974: The Rev. Burton Thomas
- 1975−1982: The Rev. Alanson Bigelow Houghton
- 1983−1995: The Rev. Hugh Hildesley
- 1996−2011: The Rev. James Lee Burns
- 2013−2023: The Rev. Matthew Heyd
- 2024–present: The Rev. Katherine Malin

Two of the Rectors, Herbert Shipman and Matthew Heyd, left the Church of the Heavenly Rest to become Bishop of New York.

== In popular culture ==
The church is featured in a scene in the 1997 film The Devil's Advocate starring Keanu Reeves, Charlize Theron and Al Pacino, but under the name « Church of the Heavenly Hope ».
