= John C. Sage =

American episcopal bishop (1866–1919)

The Right Reverend John Charles Sage
- Missionary Bishop of Salina
- Church: Episcopal Church
- See: Salina
- Elected: October 19, 1917
- In office: 1918-1919
- Predecessor: Sheldon Munson Griswold
- Successor: Robert Herbert Mize Sr.

Orders
- Ordination: November 19, 1893 by William Edward McLaren
- Consecration: January 17, 1918 by Daniel S. Tuttle

Personal details
- Born: September 12, 1866 Cleveland, Ohio, United States
- Died: October 2, 1919 (aged 53) Salina, Kansas, United States
- Denomination: Anglican
- Parents: Jacob Sage & Catharine Evans
- Spouse: Harriet Louise Murphy (m. 1891)
- Children: 1

John Charles Sage (September 12, 1866 – October 2, 1919) was the bishop of the Missionary District of Salina in The Episcopal Church from January 17, 1918, until his death.

== Biography ==
Sage was born in Cleveland on September 12, 1866, to Jacob Sage and Catharine Evans. He trained for the priesthood at the Western Theological Seminary, graduating in 1891. He was then ordained deacon on April 21, 1891, by Bishop William Andrew Leonard of Ohio in Grace Church, Cleveland, and then as a priest on November 19, 1893, by Bishop William Edward McLaren of Chicago. As a deacon he ministered in Willoughby, Ohio and was in charge of St Paul's Church in Toledo, Ohio.

In 1893 he became rector of St Luke's and All Saints’ Church in Berwyn, Illinois, while in 1897 he served as rector of St Luke's Church in Dixon, Illinois. Between 1902 and 1911, he was rector of St. John's Church in Dubuque, and then of St. John's in Keokuk from 1911 until 1918.

=== Episcopacy ===
He was elected Missionary Bishop of Salina at a special meeting of the House of Bishops held in Chicago on October 19, 1917, and was then consecrated on January 17, 1918. He compiled a prayer book called Private Prayers for the Faithful which was described as a "little manual for beginners in the habit of prayer." He also worked to secure funds with which to carry on a general educational propaganda throughout his missionary district.

=== Death ===
Sage died unexpectedly at the Bishop's House in Salina, Kansas less than two years into his episcopacy on October 2, 1919, as the result of Myocarditis. He had fallen ill in September 1919.
