= Mark A. Cowell =

21st-century American Episcopal Bishop and attorney

The Right Reverend Mark A. Cowell
- Bishop of Western Kansas
- Church: Episcopal Church
- Diocese: Western Kansas
- Elected: May 5, 2018
- In office: 2018-present
- Predecessor: Michael Milliken

Orders
- Ordination: November 29, 2003 (deacon); June 12, 2004 (priest)
- Consecration: December 1, 2018 by Michael B. Curry

Personal details
- Denomination: Anglican
- Spouse: Julie Fletcher Cowell
- Children: 3

Mark Andrew Cowell is the sixth and current bishop of the Episcopal Diocese of Western Kansas.

== Biography ==
Raised in the Episcopal Church, he attended Drew University where he majored in political science and received a bachelor's degree in 1990. He graduated from law school at Wasburn University Law School in 1994.

While working as an attorney in Kansas he received a call to the ministry. He was trained locally and ordained deacon in October 2003 and priest in June 2004.

He was consecrated on December 1, 2018, succeeding Michael Milliken. Like many clergy in his largely rural diocese, Cowell is bi-vocational. In addition to serving as bishop and as vicar of two churches he works part time as the City Municipal Prosecutor for the City of Dodge.

His wife Julie Fletcher Cowell is Pawnee County magistrate judge. They have three children: Gabriel, Gryffin and Cathleen.
