= Stormont Vail Health =

Hospital in Topeka, Kansas, U.S.

Geography
- Location: 1500 SW 10th Avenue, Topeka, Kansas, United States
- Coordinates: 39.050410°N 95.692870°W

Services
- Emergency department: Level II trauma center
- Beds: 586

History
- Opened: 1886

Links
- Website: www.stormontvail.org
- Lists: Hospitals in the United States

Stormont Vail Health is an extensive medical facility in the city of Topeka, Kansas, United States. The facility provides a nonprofit hospital and integrated health care system for Shawnee County and the northeast Kansas region.

The name derives from two earlier Topeka facilities, the Jane C. Stormont Women's Hospital and Training School for Nurses and Christ's Hospital (founded by Bishop Thomas Vail), both established in the 19th century. These two hospitals were combined in 1949 to form the Stormont–Vail Regional Medical Center. When the regional center merged with the Cotton–O'Neill Clinic in 1996, the governing foundation adopted the new name Stormont–Vail HealthCare, and this was shortened in 2016 to Stormont Vail Health.

== History ==
=== Christ's Hospital ===
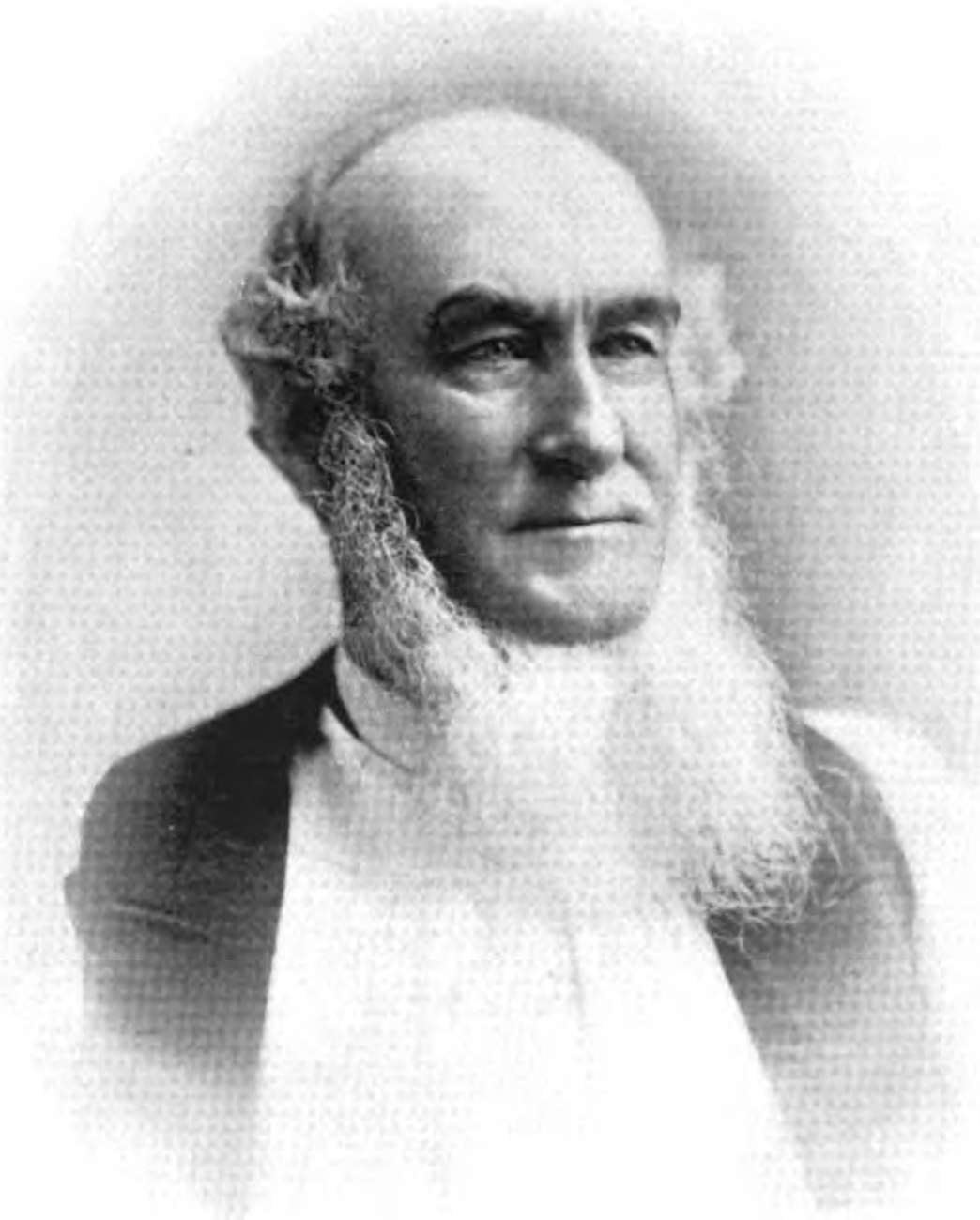
Bishop Thomas H. Vail

Christ's Hospital was the first hospital in Topeka, founded in 1884. The hospital was conceived and developed by the Rt. Rev. Thomas H. Vail (1812–1889), then the Episcopal bishop of the Kansas diocese. The bishop and his wife had already created Kansas's first training school for nurses, Christ's Hospital School of Nursing, in 1892. That same year, the bishop put forward his proposal for a community hospital; eagerly received, the project was begun in May 1883 and completed by May of the following year. The bishop and his wife had deeded the land for the hospital, a full ten acres of property, to the people of Topeka for one dollar.

Affording accommodations for twenty-four patients, the original two-story building was located between 8th and 10th Avenues west of Washburn Avenue in downtown Topeka. It was significantly expanded in 1899 and 1902 (by the addition of the eastern Kyle Annex and the western Wayne Annex, respectively) but it endured as a wooden structure until 1920, when a massive renovation project commenced. Construction took seven years, but ultimately the original building was replaced with a new Italian Renaissance-style, pink stucco building which remains today in the center of the SVHC complex.

=== Jane C. Stormont Hospital and School ===
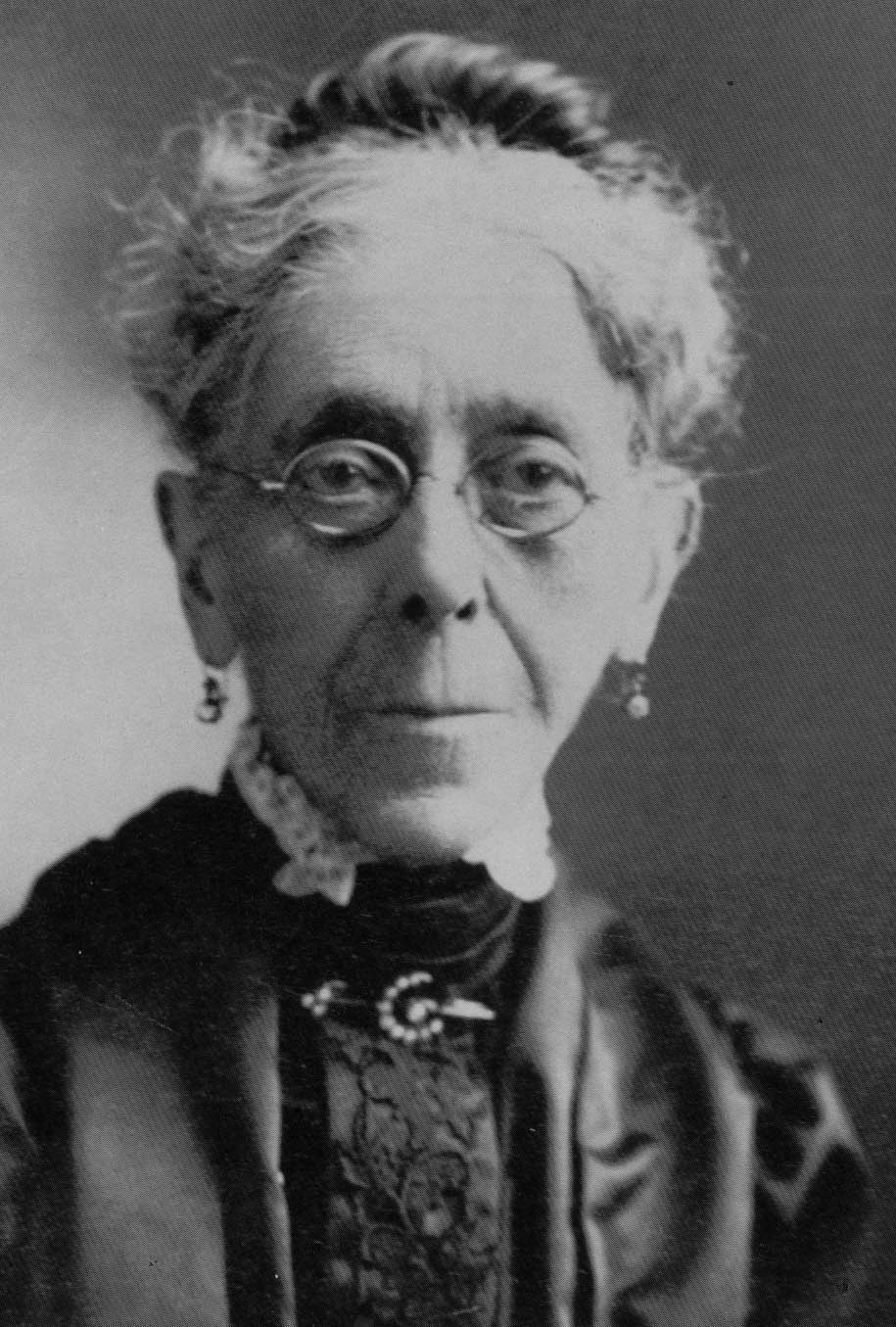
Mrs. Jane C. Stormont

Ten years after the opening of Christ's Hospital, the Jane C. Stormont Women's Hospital and Training School for Nurses opened its doors in nearby Potwin, a Topeka subdivision. Jane C. Stormont, the widow of a prominent doctor and "Topeka's best-known philanthropist", donated the funds for the twenty-five-patient facility. It was erected at a site at Ashland, which later became SW 3rd and Greenwood in Potwin. An annex was added to the facility in 1900, and a major overall expansion was begun seven years later, after Mrs. Stormont had died (in a room in her eponymous hospital) and new funds were added from her estate.

=== Stormont–Vail Regional Medical Center ===
The two hospitals merged in 1949, combining the names of their founders. As the Stormont–Vail Regional Medical Center, the hospital continued to grow ever larger to meet the needs of Topeka's increasing population. A pediatrics division was created in 1950 amid a polio epidemic, and new floors were added to the hospital in 1963. A 24-hour emergency room staff was instituted in 1970. A major expansion in 1983 added the Pozez Education Center which gave new space for a larger nursing school and other academic facilities, as well as the Ethel Stone Stauffer Health Sciences Library.

In 1987, the medical center partnered with Rocco Ortenzio's Continental Medical Systems to help build and develop a physiatric facility, the for-profit Kansas Rehabilitation Hospital. The KRH continues today as a joint venture of the SVHC and HealthSouth.

Stormont Vail began expanding its healthcare network by acquiring various physician clinics throughout northeast Kansas, and in 1995 it finalized a deal to merge with the largest one in the region, the Topeka-based Cotton O'Neil Clinic.

=== SVHC ===
The modern SVHC consists of the entire medical center (a complex now dubbed the Stormont–Vail Regional Health Center) and numerous satellite offices and clinics providing pediatrics, oncology, pulmonology, diabetes treatment, and many other specialties. It also includes an expanded school for nurses, the Baker School of Nursing, which offers Bachelor of Science and master's degrees in nursing through Baker University.

== Facilities ==
The present-day Stormont Vail Health complex operates a 586-bed acute care hospital as well as a large integrated network of primary and specialty health care providers. In 2015, Stormont Vail was awarded an "A" grade for overall patient safety by the independent nonprofit PSO The Leapfrog Group.
