= Cathleen Chittenden Bascom =

American Episcopal bishop (born 1962)

The Right Reverend Cathleen Chittenden Bascom
- Bishop of Kansas
- Church: Episcopal Church
- Diocese: Kansas
- Elected: October 19, 2018
- In office: 2019-present
- Predecessor: Dean E. Wolfe

Orders
- Ordination: December 15, 1990 by Frank Griswold
- Consecration: March 2, 2019 by Michael Curry

Personal details
- Born: Cathleen Chittenden; January 27, 1962 (age 64) Denver, Colorado, US
- Denomination: Anglican
- Parents: Bruce Eugene Chittenden & Marilyn Ward
- Spouse: Timothy Paul Bascom (m. 1987)
- Children: 2
- Education: University of Kansas

Cathleen Chittenden Bascom (born January 27, 1962) is the tenth and current bishop of the Episcopal Diocese of Kansas.

== Early life and education ==
She was raised in Denver, Colorado. She graduated from the University of Kansas in 1984 where she experienced her call to ministry. She later earned an M.Div. at Seabury-Western Theological Seminary in 1990, an M.A. in modern literature at Exeter University in 1991, a D.Min. in preaching from Iliff School of Theology in 2005, and an MFA in Creative Writing and Environment at Iowa State University in 2017.

== Ordained ministry ==
She was ordained deacon on June 9, 1990 by Bishop William E. Smalley of Kansas, and then priest on December 15, 1990 by Bishop Frank Griswold of Chicago. She then became assistant priest at St Gregory's Church in Deerfield, Illinois. From 1993 to 2001 she served as a campus minister at Kansas State. From 2001 to 2007 she served as rector of St Stephen's Church in Newton, Iowa. She was dean of the Cathedral of St Paul in Des Moines, Iowa, from 2007 to 2014 when she became an assistant professor of religion at Waldorf University.

She was elected on the second ballot by the diocesan convention on October 19, 2018. The other two candidates were also women. It was the first time in the Episcopal Church that the entire slate of candidates for the election of a bishop were women. She is the first woman to serve as bishop of the diocese since its founding in 1859. She was ordained bishop by Presiding Bishop Michael Curry at Grace Cathedral in Topeka on March 2, 2019. She is the first woman to serve as bishop of Kansas.

== Selected works ==
- Of Green Stuff Woven. Light Messages, 2020 ISBN 978-1611533361
