= Vernon E. Strickland =

American Episcopal bishop

The Right Reverend Vernon E. Strickland
- Bishop of Western Texas
- Church: Episcopal Church
- Diocese: Western Texas
- Elected: October 22, 1994
- In office: 1995-2002
- Predecessor: John F. Ashby
- Successor: James M. Adams Jr.

Orders
- Ordination: 1971
- Consecration: March 25, 1995 by Edmond L. Browning

Personal details
- Born: November 26, 1938 (age 87) Holopaw, Florida, United States
- Denomination: Anglican
- Spouse: Joyce Strickland
- Children: Teri

Vernon Edward Strickland (born November 26, 1938) was the third bishop of the Episcopal Diocese of Western Kansas, serving from 1995 to 2002.

== Early life and education ==
Strickland was born on November 26, 1938, in Holopaw, Florida. He studied at Carson Newman College from where he graduated with a Bachelor of Arts in 1967. He also earned a Master of Divinity from Virginia Theological Seminary in 1970. Prior to his training for the priesthood, he was briefly a state trooper in Florida.

== Ordained ministry ==
Strickland was ordained deacon in 1970 and priest in 1971. After ordination he served as vicar of St Agatha's Church in DeFuniak Springs, Florida, and St Thomas' Church in Laguna Beach, Florida. Later he was rector of St Luke's Church in Live Oak, Florida. In 1973 he became assistant priest at St Michael's Church in Orlando, Florida, and then in 1975 rector of St David's Church in Lakeland, Florida. In 1979, he was appointed Archdeacon of Eastern New Mexico while in 1981 he became rector of St James' Church in Dillon, Montana. In 1983, he moved to Clovis, New Mexico, and served as rector of St James' Church. After two years, in 1985, he moved to Wyoming after being offered the rectoriship of St Luke's Church in Buffalo, Wyoming. He was then appointed archdeacon of Wyoming in 1989, a post he retained until his election as bishop.

== Bishop ==
He was elected as the third Bishop of Western Kansas on October 22, 1994, and was consecrated bishop on March 25, 1995, with Presiding Bishop Edmond L. Browning as chief consecrator at the Roman Catholic Sacred Heart Cathedral, Salina, Kansas. He retired in 2002 and served as assistant bishop of the Diocese of Wyoming.
