= Thomas Hubbard Vail =

Episcopal Bishop of Kansas

The Right Reverend Thomas Hubbard Vail D.D., LL.D.
- Bishop of Kansas
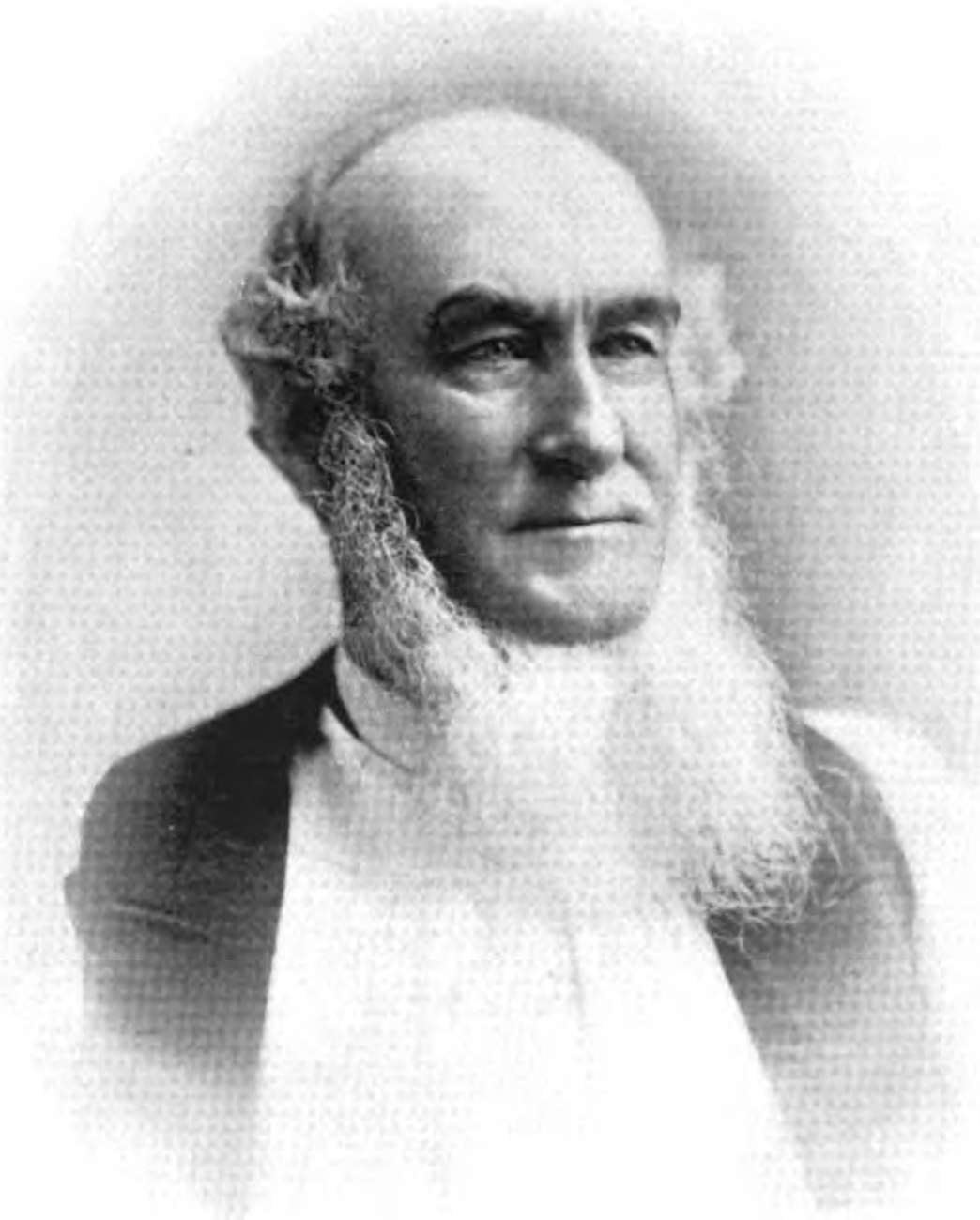
- Church: Episcopal Church
- Diocese: Kansas
- Elected: September 14, 1864
- In office: 1864–1889
- Successor: Elisha Smith Thomas

Orders
- Ordination: January 6, 1837 by Alexander Viets Griswold
- Consecration: December 15, 1864 by Jackson Kemper

Personal details
- Born: October 21, 1812 Richmond, Virginia, United States
- Died: October 6, 1889 (aged 76) Bryn Mawr, Pennsylvania, United States
- Buried: Topeka Cemetery
- Denomination: Anglican
- Parents: Israel Everett Vail & Maria Rodgers
- Spouse: Frances Sophia Burling (m. 1836; died 1864) Ellen Ledlie Bowman (m. 1867)
- Children: 9

Thomas Hubbard Vail (October 21, 1812 – October 6, 1889) was the first Episcopal Bishop of Kansas.

== Early life ==
Vail was born in Richmond, Virginia, the son of Israel E. Vail and Maria Rogers Vail, who had emigrated there from New England. He attended Washington College (now Trinity College), graduating in 1831. He next attended the General Theological Seminary, graduating in 1835. In 1836, he married Frances Sophia Burling, with whom he had seven children.

Vail was ordained deacon that year, and ordained priest in 1837. After his ordination to the priesthood, he became rector of Christ Church in Cambridge, Massachusetts, in 1837. While rector of Christ Church, Vail wrote "Hannah," a sacred drama, which he published anonymously in 1839.

Two years later, Vail moved to Essex, Connecticut, to become rector of St. John's Church in that town. In 1841, he wrote "The Comprehensive Church: or, Christian Unity and Ecclesiastical Union in the Protestant Episcopal Church", which anticipated the Chicago-Lambeth Quadrilateral. In 1844, he moved again, to Christ Church of Westerly, Rhode Island, where he remained for thirteen years. While there, Vail received a doctorate of sacred theology from Brown University.

In 1857, Vail returned to Massachusetts to become rector of St. Thomas Church in Taunton. He moved once more, in 1863, to Muscatine, Iowa, to serve as rector of Trinity Church.

== Bishop of Kansas ==
At the Fifth Annual Convention held at Atchison, Kansas, on September 14, 1864, Vail was unanimously elected Bishop of Kansas. He was consecrated the first Bishop of the Episcopal Diocese of Kansas on December 15, 1864. He was the 73rd bishop in the Episcopal Church in the United States, and was consecrated at Trinity Episcopal Church, Muscatine, Iowa, by Bishops Jackson Kemper, Henry John Whitehouse, and Henry Washington Lee. As bishop, Vail founded the College of the Sisters of Bethany (now a part of Washburn University) and earned a doctorate of laws from the University of Kansas. In 1867, his first wife having died, Vail married again, to Ellen Ledlie Bowman, the daughter of Bishop Samuel Bowman, with whom he had two more children. In 1881, Vail and his wife purchased land in Topeka and donated it for the site of Christ's Hospital (now Stormont-Vail Regional Medical Center) which was founded in 1884.

He died in 1889 in Bryn Mawr, Pennsylvania.
