= Alexander Hamilton Bowman =

United States Army officer (1803–1865)

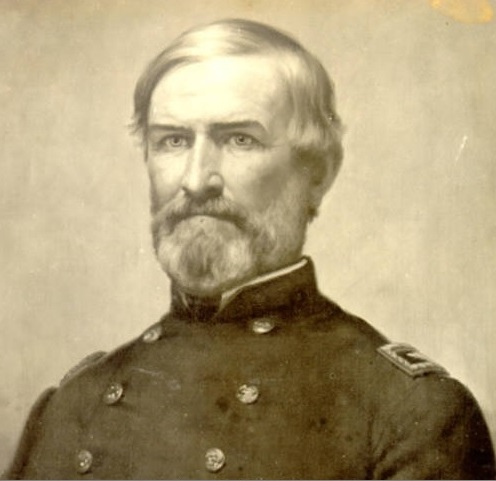
- United States Military Academy Library
- Born: May 15, 1803; Wilkes-Barre, Pennsylvania, U.S.
- Died: November 11, 1865 (aged 62); Wilkes-Barre, Pennsylvania, U.S.
- Military career
- Allegiance: United States of America; Union
- Branch: United States Army
- Service years: 1825–1865
- Rank: Lieutenant Colonel (Colonel ex officio)
- Unit: Corps of Engineers
- Commands: USMA Superintendent
- Conflicts: American Civil War

Alexander Hamilton Bowman (May 15, 1803 – November 11, 1865) was an engineer, military educator, and career officer in the United States Army. Bowman supervised the erection of Charleston Harbor defenses, including Fort Sumter, and served as Superintendent of the United States Military Academy at West Point, New York, during the American Civil War.

== Early life ==
Alexander H. Bowman was born on May 15, 1803, at Bowman's Hill in Wilkes-Barre, Pennsylvania, the sixth child of farmer Samuel Bowman. One of seven brothers who participated in the American Revolutionary War as soldiers in the Continental Army, the elder Bowman and a brother fought at Lexington as two of the village's 48 minutemen and as ensign of the 3rd Massachusetts Regiment of the Continental Line guarded the spy Major John André awaiting his execution in 1780, walking him to the gallows. Samuel Bowman was later promoted to Lieutenant of the 1st Regiment of the Massachusetts Line. One of his brothers was killed at Monmouth, but after 1786 Captain Samuel and several of his siblings moved to the Wyoming Valley of northeast Pennsylvania.

Appointed to the United States Military Academy from his native state on June 1, 1821, Bowman proved an excellent student, graduating third in his class of 37, and was appointed to the corps of engineers in 1825. Second Lieutenant Bowman spent one year teaching at the academy as "Assistant Professor of History, Geography, and Ethics." Both Jefferson Davis (Class of 1828) and Robert E. Lee (Class of 1829) attended the academy while Bowman was teaching there.

== Military career ==
Bowman was engaged engineering improvements on the facilities and defenses of Gulf Coast harbors for nine years. He built the military road between Memphis, Tennessee and Little Rock, Arkansas, then in 1835 Bowman was promoted to First Lieutenant of engineers, and married Marie Louise Colin, a native of Pensacola, Florida. After three years working in the Tennessee and Cumberland River systems, Bowman was again promoted.

In 1838, Captain Bowman began a long period supervising construction of the jetties and defenses of the harbor in Charleston, South Carolina. The Third system island coastal fortification Fort Sumter, started in 1827, was continued by Bowman and his engineers. Bowman returned to the academy in 1851, taught applied engineering to first class cadets, and was "Commandant of Sappers, Miners, and Pontoniers." Captain Bowman returned to Charleston for a year, working on engineering projects in Georgetown, South Carolina and Savannah, Georgia, before assignment in 1853 to Washington, D.C., superintending construction of the south wing extension of the U.S. Treasury Building.

On January 23, 1861, during Secession Winter and with war looming, Creole P.G.T. Beauregard was offered the office of USMA Superintendent to replace Richard Delafield. When Louisiana seceded from the Union on January 26, 1861, Beauregard's orders were revoked by the War Department, and Major Bowman was assigned to replace him (colonel ex officio). Delafield resumed the office in the brief period between Beauregard's and Bowman's commands.

As a career officer of the Corps of Engineers, Bowman served on many boards and commissions related to maritime improvements like lighthouses, river improvements and military defenses.

== Legacy ==
Bowman died at the home his father had built and he had expanded on Bowman's Hill in Wilkes-Barre, November 11, 1865. Bowman's widow, Marie Louise Bowman survived her husband and both her sons by many years, dying in the house at Bowman's Hill. Bowman had married Marie Louise Collins, daughter of Antoine Collins and Mary Pyburn in Pensacola, Florida, on February 19, 1835.

The couple had the following children:

1. Charles Stuart Bowman, born about 1837 and died in 1868.
2. Mary Ellen Bowman, born 1843.
3. Walter Bowman, born 1845 and died 1860–1865.
4. Eulalie Bowman, born 1846. She married James Hickman Rollins, a captain of the U.S. Army who died February 5, 1897, in St. Louis Missouri.
5. Louisa Bowman, born 1847 and died 1934 in Santa Barbara, California. She married Elwell Stephen Otis, who was the second American Military Governor of the Philippines.
6. Eliza Chase Bowman, born Sept 9, 1851. She married Henry Corbit Odgen, a prominent Quaker who contributed his father's correspondence to the Friends Historical Library of Swarthmore College.
7. Alexander H. Bowman Jr., born 1852 died 1870–1880 in Pennsylvania.

Charles Stuart Bowman was himself a graduate of the U.S. Military Academy in 1860. The younger Bowman mustered Kansas volunteer and Native American companies for the Union Army, commanded Fort Leavenworth for a time, and developed a reputation as an efficient cavalry officer, eventually becoming an inspector of cavalry for the War Department. Brevetted major for his actions commanding an independent detachment of the 4th United States Cavalry at the Battle of Okolona during the Meridian expedition, Charles S. Bowman died on January 13, 1868, while in Texas commanding the cavalry detachment at Camp Verde, Texas.

Bowman's brother, Samuel Bowman, was a bishop in the Episcopal Church.

== Notes ==
Military offices
Preceded by Richard Delafield	Superintendent of the United States Military Academy; 1861–1864	Succeeded by Zealous Bates Tower
