= Arnold Lewis =

Episcopalian bishop

The Right Reverend Arnold Meredith Lewis
- Suffragan Bishop of the Armed Services and Federal Ministries
- Church: Episcopal Church
- Diocese: Armed Services and Federal Ministries
- Elected: October 21, 1964
- In office: 1964–1971
- Successor: Clarence E. Hobgood
- Previous post: Missionary Bishop of Salina (1956–1964)

Orders
- Ordination: May 1936 (deacon); December 1936 (priest) by Ernest M. Stires
- Consecration: February 2, 1956 by Henry Knox Sherrill

Personal details
- Born: October 11, 1904 East Hampton, New York, United States
- Died: May 2, 1994 (aged 89) Holly Hill, Florida, United States
- Denomination: Anglican

Arnold Meredith Lewis (October 11, 1904 – May 2, 1994) was a bishop in The Episcopal Church, serving Western Kansas from 1956 to 1964 and the United States armed forces from 1964 to 1971.

== Early life and education ==
Lewis was born in East Hampton, New York on October 11, 1904, to Morley B. Lewis and Mary Robina Ettershank. He was educated at the Williston Academy in Easthampton, Massachusetts and graduated in 1922. He then studied at Springfield College from where he earned a Bachelor of Science in 1927 and a Master of Humanities in 1930. he undertook theological training at the Union Theological Seminary, the General Theological Seminary and the Virginia Theological Seminary, graduating from the latter with a Bachelor of Divinity in 1937.

== Ordained ministry ==
Lewis was ordained deacon in May 1936 and priest in December 1936 by Bishop Ernest M. Stires of Long Island. He married Frances Harrington Swift on June 6, 1927, and together had two children. After ordination he served as priest-in-charge of St Mark's Church in Westhampton Beach, New York between 1936 and 1940. During WWII he was a chaplain in the US Army, up until 1946. From 1946 to 1951 he was the Executive Director of the Presiding Bishop's Committee on Laymen's work. In 1951 he was elected Dean of St John's Cathedral in Jacksonville, Florida, a post he retained until 1956.

== Bishop ==
On September 13, 1955, Lewis was elected Missionary Bishop of Salina during the 58th general convention which took place in Honolulu. He was consecrated bishop of the Missionary District of Salina on February 2, 1956, at Christ Cathedral in Salina, Kansas by Presiding Bishop Henry Knox Sherrill. He resigned his bishopric in 1964 in favor of his election as the first Suffragan Bishop of the Armed Services and Federal Ministries. He remained in office until his retirement in 1971.
