= Richard F. Grein =

American Episcopal bishop (1932–2024)

The Right Reverend Richard Frank Grein
- 14th Bishop of New York
- Church: Episcopal Church
- Diocese: New York
- Elected: September 28, 1988
- In office: 1989–2001
- Predecessor: Paul Moore Jr.
- Successor: Mark Sisk
- Previous posts: Bishop of Kansas (1981–1988); Coadjutor Bishop of New York (1988–1989)

Orders
- Ordination: December 21, 1959 by Hamilton Hyde Kellogg
- Consecration: May 22, 1981 by John Allin

Personal details
- Born: November 29, 1932 Bemidji, Minnesota, U.S.
- Died: October 8, 2024 (aged 91) Portland, Oregon, U.S.
- Denomination: Anglican
- Parents: Ray Clausen and Lavina Frost
- Spouse: (1) Joan D. Atkinson (m. 1961); (2) Anne Richards (m. 2004)
- Children: 4

Richard Frank Grein (November 29, 1932 – October 8, 2024), born Richard Frank Clausen, was an American Episcopal clergyman who served as Bishop of Kansas from 1981 to 1989 and Bishop of New York from 1989 to 2001.

== Education and early career ==
Born in Bemidji, Minnesota, to Ray Clausen and Lavina Frost, Grein was later adopted by Lester Grein following his parents' divorce. He studied at Carleton College in Minnesota, where he played football, and was invited to try out for the Washington Redskins. He later studied at Nashotah House in Wisconsin, where he earned a Master of Divinity degree as well as a Master's degree in pastoral theology.

He was ordained as a deacon on June 20, 1959 and as a priest on December 21, 1959, and initially served in parishes in Minnesota, including Elk River. He was a professor of pastoral theology at Nashotah House from 1973 until 1974, when he became rector of Saint Michael and All Angels Church in Mission, Kansas.

== Later career ==
=== Bishop of Kansas ===
On February 14, 1981, Grein was elected Bishop of Kansas at a special diocesan convention at Grace Episcopal Cathedral in Topoeka. He was consecrated bishop on May 22, 1981, by Presiding Bishop John Allin. As Bishop of Kansas, he ordained the diocese's first female priest and helped to revitalize the diaconate and diocesan structure.

=== Bishop of New York ===
In 1989 Grein was elected Bishop of New York and was installed as bishop at the Cathedral of St. John the Divine on October 14 of the same year.

He devoted much of his time and energy as Bishop of New York to financial and administrative endeavors such as Episcopal Charities, the congregational support plan, the Trustees of the Diocese, renewal of the diaconate, and renewal of the priesthood. He also created and expanded the diocesan endowment fund, and launched a program to give financial help to congregations with insufficient funds to pay their own bills. He believed that "strong parishes mean a strong diocese".

Grein also fostered relationships with an Anglican diocese in South Africa and the Eastern Orthodox Church. One of his last major public ceremonies was as part of the Episcopal delegation invited to Moscow in 2000, where he and the Rt. Rev. George Packard were the only Western Christian leaders to attend the consecration of the newly rebuilt Cathedral of Christ the Saviour on August 19 of that year.

== Later life and family ==
Grein retired on June 30, 2001. In 2002 he was sued for wrongfully dismissing the Rev. Janet Broderick Kraft (a priest at Grace Church, Manhattan, whose brother is the actor Matthew Broderick), and replacing her with the Rev. Anne Richards. The case was settled out of court.

In 1961 Grein married Joan Atkinson, with whom he had a son and three daughters. They divorced in the early 2000s. In 2004 he married a former member of his staff, the Rev. Anne Richards (1951−2018), who worked as a priest in both the New York and Connecticut dioceses.

He died at his home in Portland, Oregon, on October 8, 2024, at the age of 91. A memorial service was held at the Cathedral of St. John the Divine in January 2025.

Episcopal Church (USA) titles
Preceded by Paul Moore Jr.	Bishop of New York; 1989–2001	Succeeded by Mark Sisk
