= Episcopal Diocese of Western Kansas =

Diocese of the Episcopal Church in the United States

Coordinates: 38°50′21″N 97°36′43″W

Diocese of Western Kansas
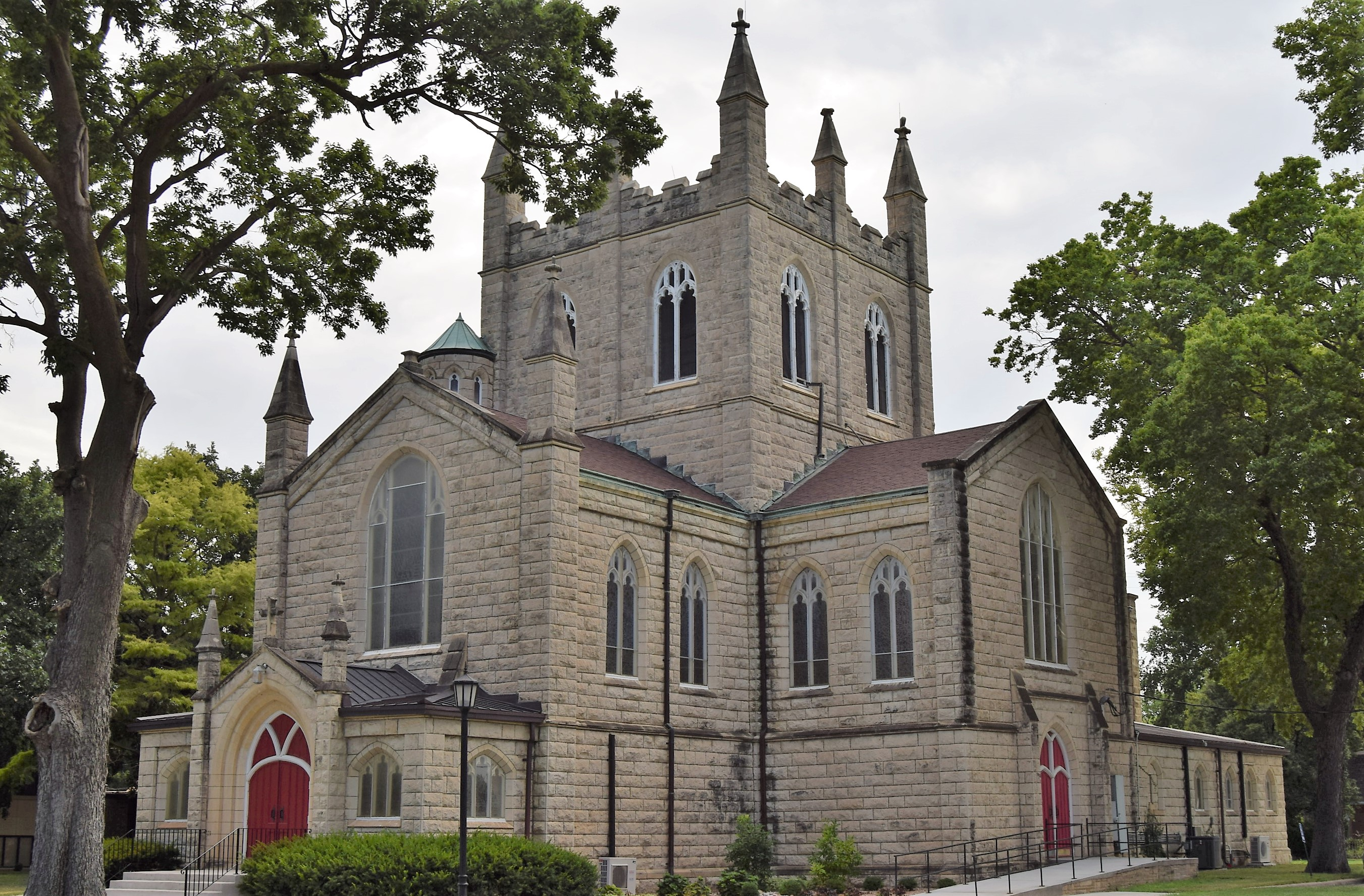
- Christ Cathedral in Salina

- Diocesan Seal

Location
- Country: United States
- Territory: The Kansas counties of Barber, Barton, Cheyenne, Clark, Cloud, Comanche, Decatur, Edwards, Ellis, Ellsworth, Finney, Ford, Gove, Graham, Grant, Gray, Greeley, Hamilton, Harper, Haskell, Hodgeman, Jewell, Kearny, Kingman, Kiowa, Lane, Lincoln, Logan, McPherson, Meade, Mitchell, Morton, Ness, Norton, Osborne, Ottawa, Pawnee, Phillips, Pratt, Rawlins, Reno, Republic, Rice, Rooks, Rush, Russell, Saline, Scott, Seward, Sheridan, Sherman, Smith, Stanton, Stevens, St John, Thomas, Trego, Wallace, and Wichita
- Ecclesiastical province: Province VII

Statistics
- Congregations: 21 (2025)
- Members: 1,116 (2025)

Information
- Denomination: United States
- Established: October 15, 1971
- Cathedral: Christ Cathedral, Salina

Current leadership
- Bishop: Mark A. Cowell

Map
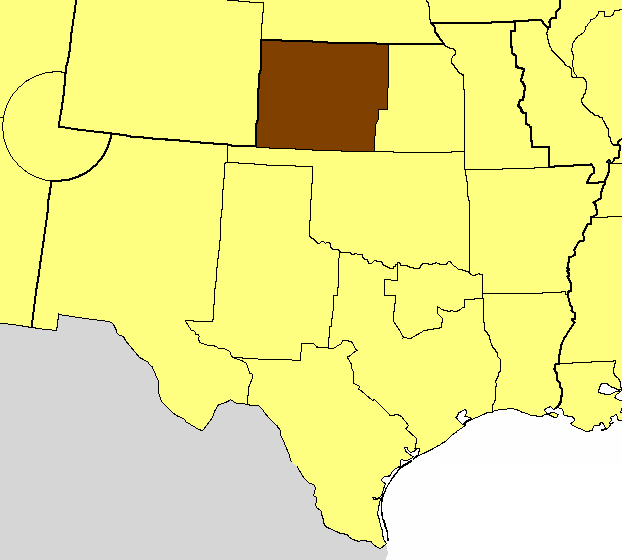
- Location of the Diocese of Western Kansas

Website
- https://www.diowks.org/

The Episcopal Diocese of Western Kansas, created in 1971, is the diocese of the Episcopal Church in the United States of America with jurisdiction over western Kansas. It was formerly the Missionary District of Salina until 1960 and then the Missionary District of Western Kansas until 1971. It is in Province 7. Its cathedral, Christ Episcopal Cathedral, is in Salina. The diocesan offices are located in Hutchinson.

The diocese reported 1,378 members in 2018 and 1,116 members in 2025. Plate and pledge income for the 21 filing congregations of the diocese in 2025 was $745,697. Average Sunday attendance (ASA) was 404 persons, down from a reported 1,588 in 2020.

== Current bishop ==
Bishop Mark Cowell was consecrated as the sixth diocesan bishop of Western Kansas on December 1, 2018.

== List of bishops of Western Kansas ==
The bishops of Western Kansas have been:

=== Missionary ===
- Sheldon M. Griswold (1903–1917)
- John C. Sage (1918–1919)
- Robert H. Mize (1921–1938)
- Shirley Hall Nichols (1943–1955)
- Arnold M. Lewis (1956–1964)
- William Davidson, last missionary bishop (1966–1971), first diocesan bishop (1971–1980)

=== Diocesan ===
1. William Davidson, last missionary bishop (1966–1971), first diocesan bishop (1971–1980)
2. John F. Ashby (1981–1995)
3. Vernon E. Strickland (1995–2002)
4. James M. Adams (2002–2010), resigned in January, 2010
5. Michael Pierce Milliken (2011–2018)
6. Mark Cowell (2018- )

== See also ==
- List of Succession of Bishops for the Episcopal Church, USA
