= St. Andrew's Episcopal Church (Emporia, Kansas) =

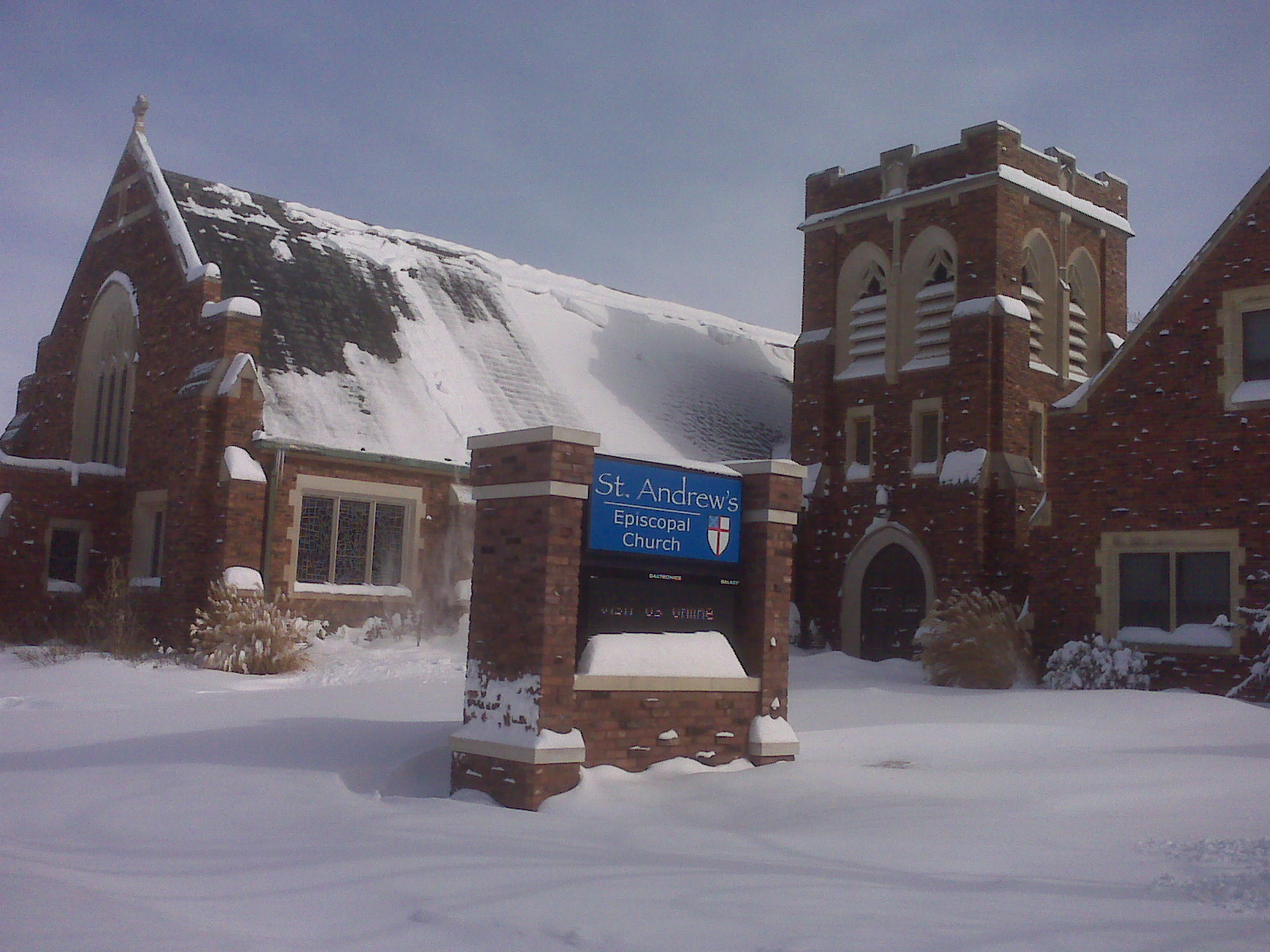
- St. Andrew's in 2011
- St. Andrew's Episcopal Church
- 38°24′30″N 96°10′47″W
- Location: 828 Commercial Street; Emporia, Kansas 66801
- Country: United States
- Denomination: Episcopal
- Website: www.standrewsemporia.org

History
- Status: Church
- Founded: February 14, 1870

Architecture
- Functional status: Active

Administration
- Diocese: Episcopal Diocese of Kansas

Clergy
- Bishop: The Rt. Rev. Cathleen Bascom
- Rector: The Right Rev. Daniel Genovesi

St. Andrew's Episcopal Church is a parish established in Emporia, Kansas on February 14, 1870, as part of the Episcopal Diocese of Kansas. Its rector is the Right Rev. Daniel Genovesi.

In 2015, the church reported 130 members; in 2023, it reported 95 members. No membership statistics were reported in 2024 national parochial reports. Plate and pledge financial support reported by the church in 2024 was $151,705. Average Sunday Attendance (ASA) reported in 2024 was 27 persons. This was a relative decrease from ASA of 49 reported in 2020.

== Building ==
St. Andrew's first building was constructed in the Fall of 1870 and was of a Gothic Revival style. In 1928, the original building was replaced by a larger Gothic Revival architecture building.
