= John F. Ashby =

American bishop

The Right Reverend John Forsythe Ashby
- Bishop of Western Texas
- Church: Episcopal Church
- Diocese: Western Texas
- Elected: February 14, 1981
- In office: 1981-1995
- Predecessor: William Davidson
- Successor: Vernon E. Strickland

Orders
- Ordination: December 1955 by W. R. Chilton Powell
- Consecration: May 21, 1981 by John Allin

Personal details
- Born: March 26, 1929 Tulsa, Oklahoma, United States
- Died: May 10, 2001 (aged 72) Tulsa, Oklahoma, United States
- Denomination: Anglican
- Parents: Thomas Albert Ashby & Margaret Mote
- Spouse: Mary Carver (m. 1954)
- Children: 2

John Forsythe Ashby (March 26, 1929 – May 10, 2001) was an American bishop in the Episcopal Church.

== Early life and education ==
Ashby was born in Tulsa, Oklahoma, on March 26, 1929, son of Thomas Albert Ashby and Margaret Mote Cassady. He received a bachelor's degree in Psychology and Sociology from Oklahoma State University in 1952 and a master's degree in divinity from the Episcopal Theological Seminary of the Southwest in 1955. Between 1966 and 1967, he studied New Testament ethics as a member of Pembroke College, Cambridge in England and was awarded a Master of Arts in 1967. He was awarded an honorary Doctor of Divinity from the Episcopal Theological Seminary of the Southwest in 1981. He married Mary Carver on August 12, 1954, and together they had two children.

== Ordained ministry ==
Ashby was ordained priest in December 1955 and became vicar of St John's Church in Durant, Oklahoma, and St Peter's Church in Coalgate, Oklahoma. In 1959 he became rector of St Luke's Church, in Ada, Oklahoma, where he remained until 1981. He was also a chaplain in the Oklahoma National Guard and held the rank of lieutenant colonel.

== Bishop ==
On February 14, 1981, Ashby was elected on the sixth ballot as the second Bishop of Western Kansas during a special diocesan convention. He was then consecrated on May 21, 1981, at St. John's Military School in Salina, Kansas; John Maury Allin was chief consecrator. Ashby led the Episcopal Diocese of Western Kansas until his retirement in 1995. In 1986, he travelled to Guam to serve as interim bishop of the Episcopal Church in Micronesia. In 1992, as an ecumenical gesture, he named a Roman Catholic priest an honorary canon. He retired in January 1995. He died in 2001.
