= Clarence E. Hobgood =

- Church: Episcopal Church of the United States

Orders
- Consecration: February 2, 1971

Personal details
- Born: August 30, 1914
- Died: February 29, 2008 (aged 93)

Clarence E. Hobgood (August 30, 1914 – February 29, 2008) was the suffragan bishop for the Armed Forces in the Episcopal Church in the United States of America from 1971 to 1978.

Hobgood was consecrated on February 2, 1971.
