= Dean E. Wolfe =

The Right Reverend Dean E. Wolfe
- Rector of St Bartholomew's Church
- Church: Episcopal Church
- Appointed: 2016
- In office: 2017-present
- Predecessor: F. M. Stallings Jr.
- Previous post: Bishop of Kansas (2004-2017)

Orders
- Ordination: 1992 by William E. Swing
- Consecration: November 8, 2003 by D. Bruce MacPherson

Personal details
- Born: June 4, 1956 (age 70) Dayton, Ohio, United States
- Denomination: Anglican
- Parents: Bill and Millie Wolfe
- Spouse: Elle Frantz-Wolfe
- Children: 1

Dean Elliott Wolfe, D.D. (born June 4, 1956) is an Episcopal bishop who retired as the thirteenth rector of St. Bartholomew's Church in New York City in March 2025. Previously, he served as the ninth Bishop of Kansas between 2004 and 2017.

== Early life and education ==
Wolfe was born on June 4, 1956, in Dayton, Ohio, to Bill and Millie Wolfe. He was raised in the Church of the Brethren and by the age of 16 was licensed to preach in that church while, at the age of 21, he was given responsibility for a parish. He pursued his undergraduate studies at Miami University, earning a Bachelor of Arts degree in political science and religion in 1987, and then worked in sales and marketing. He joined the Episcopal Church when he was studying at Bethany Theological Seminary. Later, he enrolled at Virginia Theological Seminary from where he earned his Master of Divinity degree in 1992. The latter also awarded him an honorary Doctor of Divinity in 2004.

== Ordained ministry ==
Wolfe was ordained deacon and priest in 1992 at Grace Cathedral in San Francisco. He then served as associate rector of Saint Clement's Episcopal Church, Berkeley, California (1992-1994). In 1994, he became associate rector of Trinity Church in Boston, contributing to the dynamic growth and spiritual renewal of the largest Episcopal parish in New England (1994-1998). He then served as vice rector of the Church of St. Michael and All Angels in Dallas, Texas, overseeing ministries in what was then the largest Episcopal parish in the United States (1998-2003).

== Bishop of Kansas ==
On July 12, 2003, Wolfe was elected on the fifth ballot to serve as Coadjutor Bishop of Kansas. He was consecrated at Grace Cathedral on November 8, 2003, by the Bishop of Western Louisiana, D. Bruce MacPherson. He succeeded as diocesan bishop on January 1, 2004. During his episcopacy he revised the campus ministry program to provide an opportunity for an Episcopal presence on a larger number of campuses across the diocese. He also was committed to a robust diocesan youth ministry. He helped strengthen the Kansas School for Ministry and later helped create it successor, the Bishop Kemper School for Ministry. He resigned as bishop on January 31, 2017 as he became the rector of St. Bartholomew’s Church in New York City,

=== Vice President, House of Bishops ===
From June 2009 to January 2017, Wolfe served three terms as Vice President of the House of Bishops of the Episcopal Church.

== Rector of St. Bartholomew's ==
In 2016, Wolfe was called as rector of St. Bartholomew's Church in New York City and accepted on November 13, 2016. He commenced his ministry on February 5, 2017, and was formally installed as the 13th rector by the Bishop of New York, Andrew M. L. Dietsche, on June 9, 2017. He provided leadership to one of the largest Episcopal parishes in the city. He retired in March 2025.

== See also ==
- List of Episcopal bishops of the United States
- Historical list of the Episcopal bishops of the United States
