= Christ Cathedral (Salina, Kansas) =

Historic church in Kansas, United States

- U.S. National Register of Historic Places
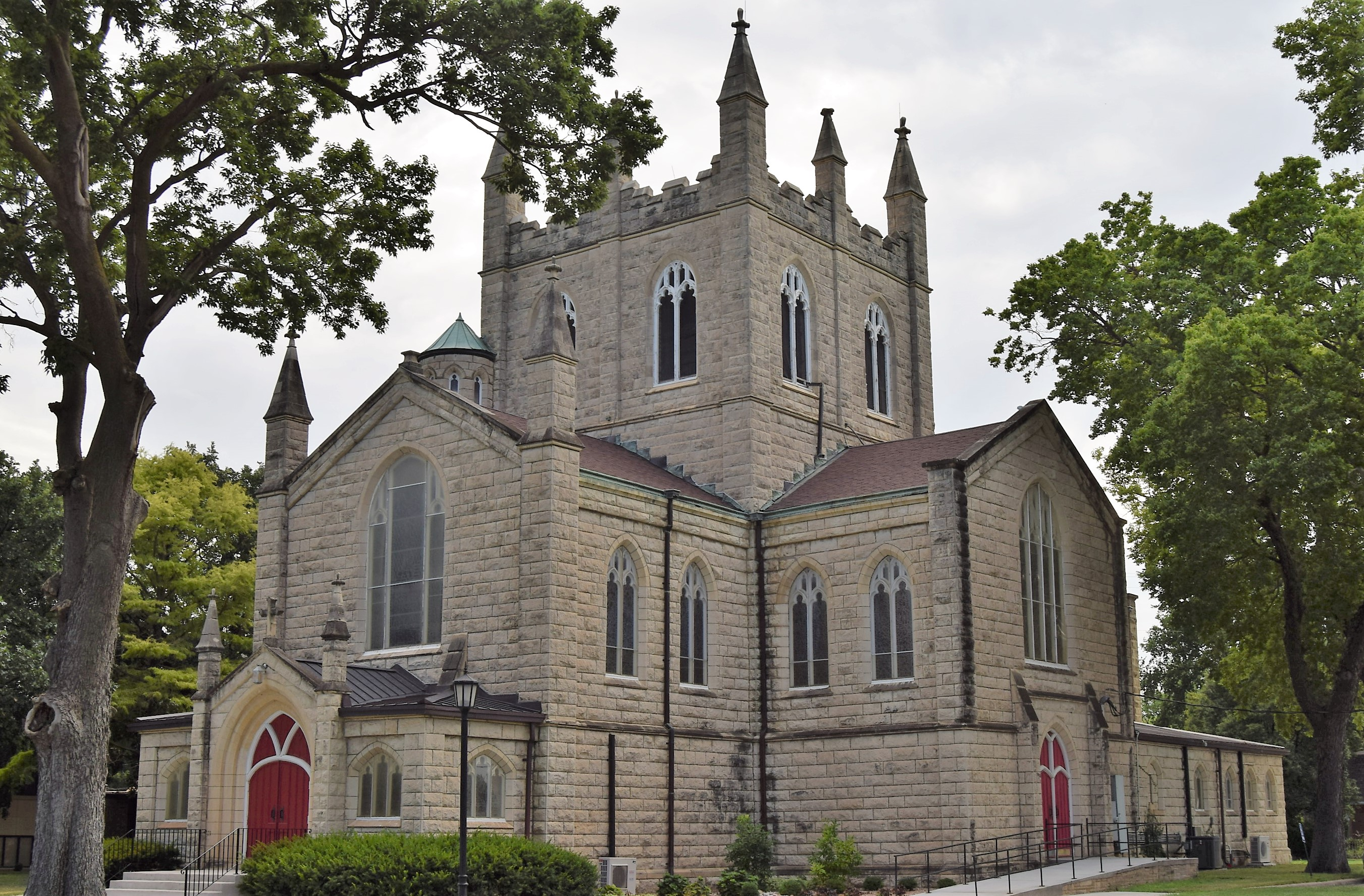
- Christ Cathedral in 2017

- Location within Kansas Location within the United States
- Location: 138 South 8th St. Salina, Kansas
- Coordinates: 38°50′21″N 97°36′43″W
- Area: Less than one acre
- Built: 1907
- Architects: Charles Marquendent Burns, Jr.
- Architectural style: Gothic Revival
- NRHP reference No.: 10000429
- Added to NRHP: July 6, 2010

Christ Cathedral is the cathedral church for the Episcopal Diocese of Western Kansas. It is located in Salina, Kansas, United States, and has been listed on the National Register of Historic Places since 2010.

In 2015, the church reported 185 members; in 2025, it reported 208 members. Plate and pledge financial support reported by the church in 2025 was $159,684. Average Sunday Attendance (ASA) reported in 2025 was 65 persons. This was a relative decrease from ASA of 90 reported in 2019.

== History ==
Episcopalians initially met in Salina in the general store as well as in church buildings of other Christian denominations. Christ Church was formed as the first Episcopal parish in the city and a frame church building was constructed in 1872. The Right Rev. Sheldon M. Griswold, the first bishop of the Missionary District of Salina, was the first to plan for a new cathedral.

Sarah Eliza (Farhnam) Batterson of New York, the widow of the Rev. Hermon Griswold Batterson, was looking for a way to memorialize her husband and donated a large sum of money to build the present cathedral. The gift came with stipulations. Philadelphia architect Charles Marquendent Burns Jr., a personal friend of her husband, was to design the building. She wanted chairs in the nave instead of pews, and insisted they be free and unsigned to parishioners. Bishop Griswold initially asked for $10,000 to $15,000. Mrs. Batterson initially offered $25,000, and then raised the amount to $35,000. In the end her gifts totaled over $50,000. The cornerstone was laid on May 29, 1906, and the first service in the cathedral was held on January 8, 1908. Cuthbert and Sons of Topeka, Kansas, built the structure. Also on the cathedral property is a parish hall built in 1948 and a two-story education and office building completed in 1956.

== Architecture ==
The cathedral is cruciform in shape and faces the east. A bell tower sits at the crossing and contains a carillon of 23 bells. The tower also contains eight screened windows and is topped by eight pinnacles with finials. Entrances are located on the main façade and in the two transepts. The choir and chancel on the west side of the cathedral has nine stained glass windows. There are also windows in the main nave and in the transepts. All but two of the windows are part of series titled "Following the Steps in the Ministry of Christ." Above the main entrance is the Ascension window made by J. & R. Lamb Studios and installed in 1961. The St. Michael's Chapel is located off the north transept. The acolyte, choir room, and a restroom are off the south transept. The building covers 6,400 square feet (590 m^{2}).

The exterior of the cathedral is covered entirely of limestone quarried in Chase County, Kansas, about 95 miles to the southeast of Salina. The stone that was used for the entrance steps and the door sills was quarried in Lyon County, Kansas. The dressed stone used on the cathedral was quarried in Silverdale, Kansas.

The interior walls are covered in limestone. The seating capacity is 220 and the original chairs, made by the Manitowoc Seating Works of Chicago, are still in use. They are black-stained oak with cane seats and kneelers. The floor tiles in the chancel and choir feature symbols from early Christianity and were made by the Moravian Pottery and Tile Works in Doylestown, Pennsylvania. The canopies over the bishop's cathedra, dean's stall and canon stalls are hand carved, quarter-sawn oak that are stained black. The diocesan coat of arms is cut into the back of the bishop's chair. The choir stalls are simpler in design. The pulpit and lectern in the crossing are also carved of oak.

Also at the crossing at the entrance to the choir is a rood beam, which was put in place in 1918 as a memorial to the cathedral's primary benefactor, Sarah E. Batterson. The carvings on the beam were by Alois Lang of the Manitowoc Seating Works. He also carved the St. Paul statue located in one of the niches in the pulpit.

The original pipe organ in the choir was built by Henry Pilcher's Sons, of Louisville, Kentucky. It was replaced in 1977 by the present organ, which was designed by Canon Royce Young and built by the M. P. Moller Pipe Organ Company of Hagerstown, Maryland.

The high altar was carved from Carthage marble. The center carving features the symbol of Christ the Savior and is flanked by two quatrefoils. The reredos was carved from Silverdale limestone. Four pinnacles rise from it and are capped with crockets. St. Mary's Altar is located in the northwest corner of the north transept. It is the oldest altar in the cathedral having been originally used by Christ Church parish in 1887. It is carved from oak in three panels. The center panel features the symbol of Christ the Savior and is flanked by the Alpha on the left and Omega on the right. The words "IN REMEMBRANCE OF ME" are carved along the upper front part of the altar.

== See also ==
- List of the Episcopal cathedrals of the United States
- List of cathedrals in the United States
