= Andrew M. L. Dietsche =

The Right Reverend Andrew M. L. Dietsche
- 16th Bishop of New York
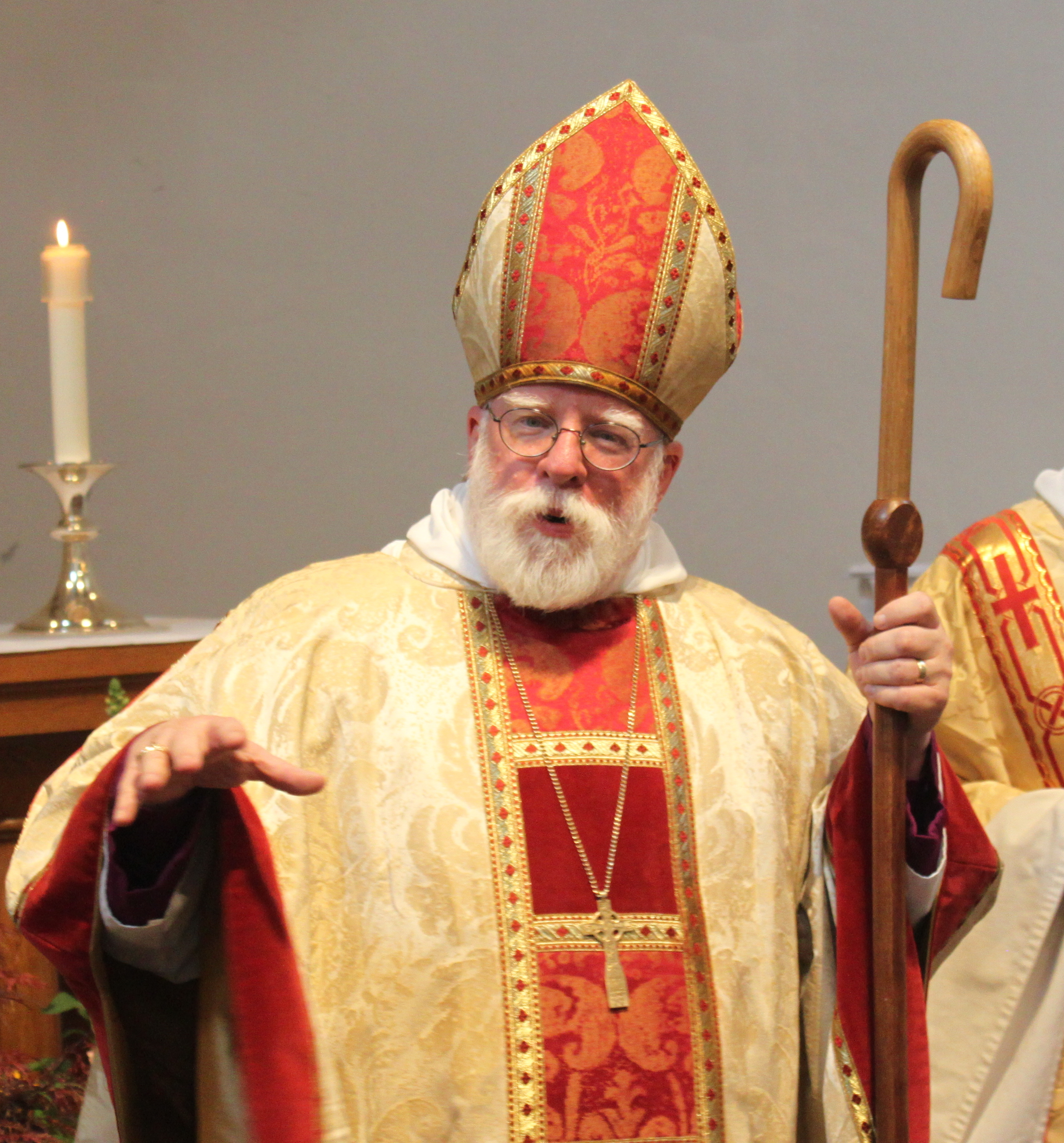
- Bishop Dietsche in 2018
- Church: Episcopal Church
- Diocese: New York
- Elected: November 19, 2011
- In office: 2013–2024
- Predecessor: Mark Sisk
- Successor: Matthew Heyd
- Previous post: Coadjutor Bishop of New York (2012-2013)

Orders
- Ordination: 1987 (deacon); 1987 (priest)
- Consecration: March 10, 2012 by Katharine Jefferts Schori

Personal details
- Born: November 9, 1953 (age 72)
- Denomination: Anglican
- Spouse: Margaret Mahoney Dietsche
- Children: 2

Andrew Marion Lenow Dietsche (born November 9, 1953) is an American prelate who served as the 16th Bishop of New York in the Episcopal Church from 2013 to 2024.

== Biography ==
Prior to his ordination, Dietsche was a freelance graphic designer and cartoonist – and he continues to this day to produce cartoons for the Episcopal New Yorker. After studies at Seabury-Western Theological Seminary, Dietsche was ordained to the priesthood in 1987. From 1987 to 1990 he served at Christ Church in Winnetka, Illinois, and from 1990 till 2001 as the rector of the Church of the Good Shepherd in West Springfield, Massachusetts.

From 2001 until his election as a bishop, he served as Canon for Pastoral Care in the diocese, being responsible for the pastoral care of the clergy and their families. He was elected bishop coadjutor by clergy and lay representatives of diocese at a special diocesan convention held at the Cathedral Church of Saint John the Divine on November 19, 2011.

Dietsche was consecrated at the cathedral on March 10, 2012, and formally installed as the 16th Bishop of New York on February 2, 2013. He was succeeded in 2024 by the Rt. Rev. Matthew Heyd.

He was appointed Officer of the Order of St John (OStJ), in September 2017.

== See also ==
- List of Episcopal bishops of the United States
- List of bishops of the Episcopal Church in the United States of America

Episcopal Church (USA) titles
Preceded by Mark Sisk	Bishop of New York; 2013−2024	Succeeded by Matthew Heyd
