= Mark Sisk =

American Episcopal Bishop

The Right Reverend Mark Sisk
- 15th Bishop of New York
- Church: Episcopal Church
- Diocese: New York
- Elected: 1997
- In office: 2001–2013
- Predecessor: Richard F. Grein
- Successor: Andrew M. L. Dietsche
- Previous post: Coadjutor Bishop of New York (1998-2001)

Orders
- Ordination: 1967
- Consecration: April 25, 1998 by Frank Griswold

Personal details
- Born: August 18, 1942 (age 83) Takoma Park, Maryland, United States
- Denomination: Anglican
- Parents: Robert James Sisk, Alma Irene Davis
- Spouse: Karen Womack Calvert (m. Aug. 31, 1963)
- Children: 3

Mark Sean Sisk (born in Takoma Park, Maryland, August 18, 1942) was the 15th Episcopal Bishop of New York. He retired on February 2, 2013, when he was succeeded by Andrew M.L. Dietsche.

== Early education, career, and marriage ==
Sisk received his B.S. in Economics from The University of Maryland in 1964. He attended the General Theological Seminary in New York City, where he earned his M.Div. in 1967. He also received honorary doctorates from the General Theological Seminary, Honorary Doctor of Divinity, in 1984, and Seabury-Western Theological Seminary, in 1998.

He is married to Karen Womack Calvert. They have three children and three grandchildren.

Sisk was a curate for three years at Christ Episcopal Church, in New Brunswick, New Jersey, and then an associate priest at Christ Episcopal Church in Bronxville, New York between 1970 and 1973. He was then rector of St. John's Episcopal Church in Kingston, New York from 1973-1977. From 1977 through 1984, he was the Archdeacon of three suburban counties, under the 13th Bishop of New York, Paul Moore. As part of his duties, he started a Japanese-speaking congregation, now in Scarsdale, and a Latino congregation in Yonkers.

From 1984 to 1998, Sisk was President and Dean of Seabury-Western Theological Seminary in Evanston, Illinois.

== Bishop of New York ==
Sisk was elected and consecrated bishop coadjutor of the Episcopal Diocese of New York in 1998. He was installed as the Bishop of New York at a ceremony on September 29, 2001, at the Cathedral of St. John the Divine.

Sisk was actively involved in preaching to churches in his diocese, as well as the cathedral. He raised millions of dollars for Episcopal charities. Sisk was also involved in ecumenism with the Roman Catholic Church.

== Criticism ==
Sisk engendered some criticism from the press for some of his actions as bishop, in particular the firing of a radical priest. He was also involved in the controversy over Bishop Moore's bisexuality.

== Public comments ==
As a leader in the church, Sisk was often asked to comment on public issues. He had a regular column in Newsweek and the Washington Post. The New York Times often interviews him on social and religious topics. He takes stances on a variety of issues. He has written many letters that have been collected by the Anglican Communion.

== See also ==
- Succession of Bishops of the Episcopal Church in the United States

Episcopal Church (USA) titles
Preceded by Richard F. Grein	Bishop of New York; 2001−2013	Succeeded by Andrew M. L. Dietsche
