= Frank C. Millspaugh =

American politician (1872–1947)

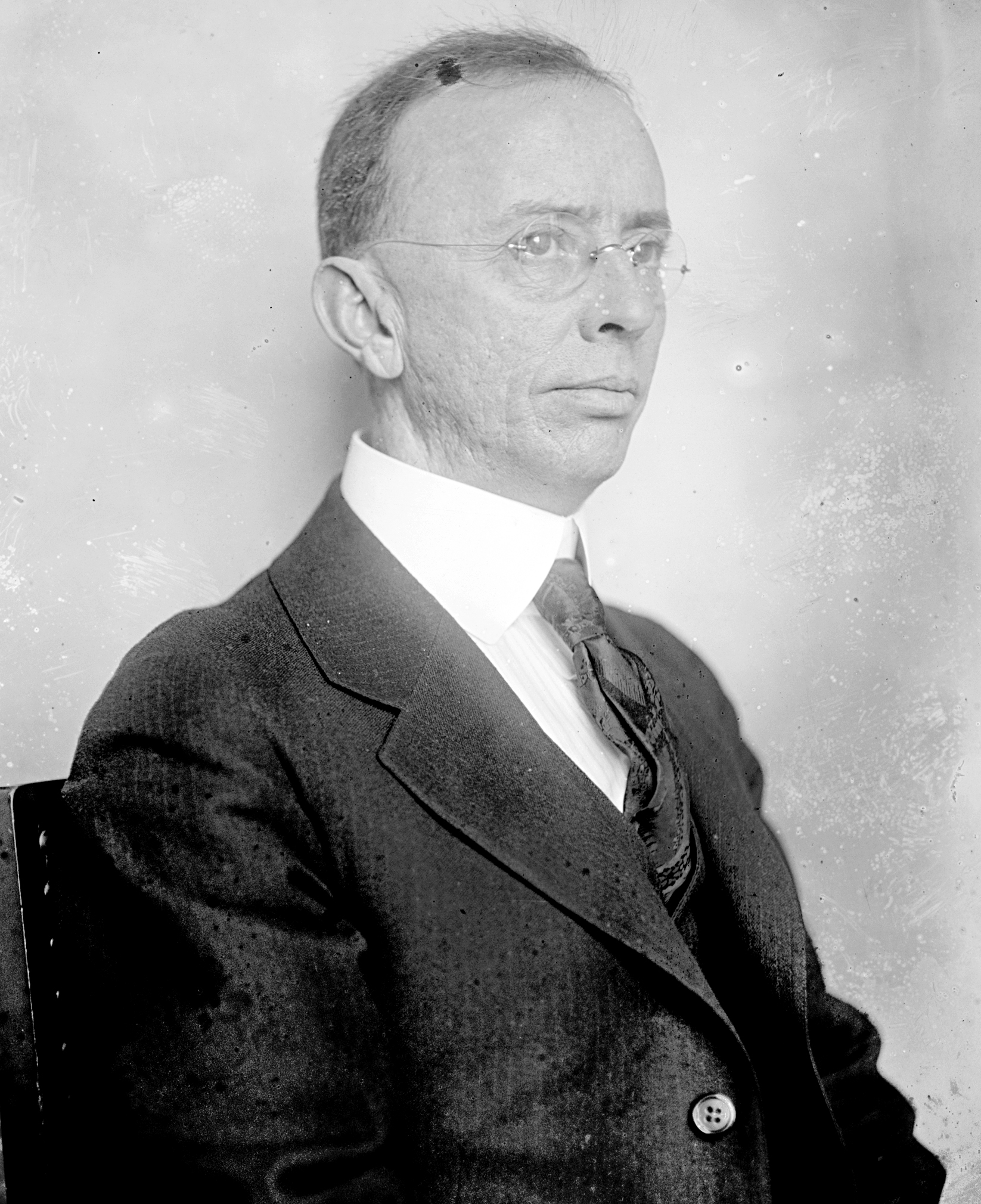

Member of the U.S. House of Representatives from Missouri's 1st district
- In office March 4, 1921 – December 5, 1922
- Preceded by: Milton A. Romjue
- Succeeded by: Milton A. Romjue

Mayor of Canton, Missouri
- In office 1915–1919

Personal details
- Born: Frank Crenshaw Millspaugh; January 14, 1872 Shawneetown, Illinois, U.S.
- Died: July 8, 1947 (aged 75) Joplin, Missouri, U.S.
- Resting place: Forest Grove Cemetery, Canton, Missouri, U.S.
- Party: Republican
- Profession: Politician

Frank Crenshaw Millspaugh (January 14, 1872 – July 8, 1947) was a United States representative from Missouri.

Born in Shawneetown, Illinois, Millspaugh attended public schools. He entered the grain commission business in New Orleans, Louisiana, in 1891. He moved to Chicago in 1892, to St. Louis, Missouri, in 1894 and to Canton, Missouri, in 1896 and continued the grain shipping business. He engaged in banking 1900-1921. He served as delegate to the Republican State convention in 1912. He served as mayor of Canton from 1915 to 1919.

Millspaugh was elected as a Republican to the Sixty-seventh Congress; he was an unsuccessful candidate in 1922 for reelection to the Sixty-eighth Congress and resigned, having served March 4, 1921 until December 5, 1922. He was the State commissioner of finance in 1923 and 1924.

He moved to Jefferson City, Missouri, in 1925 and engaged in the real estate business until 1929, when he entered the brokerage business. Millspaugh was elected county judge of Jasper County, Missouri, in 1942 and was reelected in 1944 and 1946; he served until his death in Joplin, Missouri, July 8, 1947 at the age of 75 and was interred in Forest Grove Cemetery, Canton, Missouri.

U.S. House of Representatives
Preceded by Milton A. Romjue	Member of the U.S. House of Representatives from Missouri's 1st congressional district 1921-1922	Succeeded by Milton A. Romjue
