= Frank Rosebrook Millspaugh =

American bishop

The Right Reverend Frank Rosebrook Millspaugh D.D.
- Bishop of Kansas
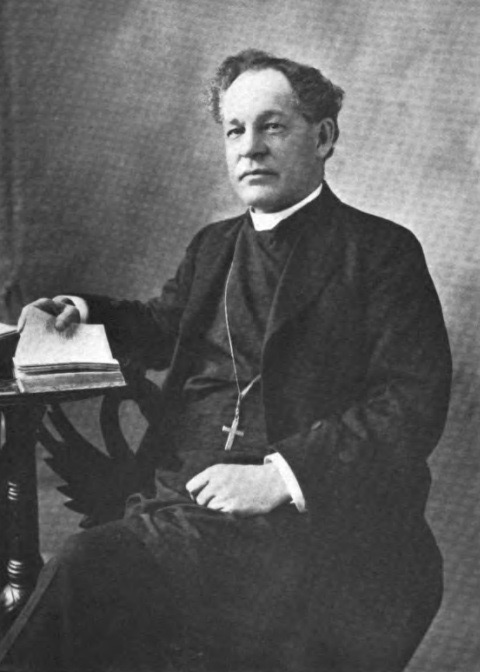
- Church: Episcopal Church
- Diocese: Kansas
- Elected: May 28, 1895
- In office: 1895-1916
- Predecessor: Elisha Smith Thomas
- Successor: James H. Wise

Orders
- Ordination: June 21, 1874 by Henry Benjamin Whipple
- Consecration: September 19, 1895 by Henry Benjamin Whipple

Personal details
- Born: April 12, 1848 Nichols, New York, United States
- Died: November 22, 1916 (aged 68) Topeka, Kansas, United States
- Buried: Grace Cathedral
- Denomination: Anglican
- Parents: Cornelius Madden Millspaugh & Elvira Rosebrook
- Spouse: Mary Clarkson (m. 1882)
- Children: 3

Frank Rosebrook Millspaugh (April 12, 1848 – November 22, 1916), was the Bishop of Kansas from 1895 until his death.

== Early life, family, and education ==
Millspaugh was born on April 12, 1848, in Nichols, New York, the son of Cornelius Madden Millspaugh and Elvira Rosebrook. His family was of Dutch descent, the family name being changed from von Miltzbach to Millspaugh when New Amsterdam was taken over by the English in 1664. He moved with his family to Ithaca, New York, when he was still a child and then to Faribault, Minnesota, in 1857. While there, he attended the parish schools and was under the tutorship of the Reverend James Lloyd Breck. He then attended Shattuck School from where he graduated in 1870. He also studied at Seabury Divinity School, graduating on June 20, 1873.

== Ordained ministry ==
He was made deacon on June 22, 1873, by Henry Benjamin Whipple, and ordained to the priesthood by the same bishop on June 21, 1874, at the Cathedral of Our Merciful Saviour. He initially served as a missionary in northeastern Minnesota, after which he was dean of Trinity Cathedral (Omaha, Nebraska) from 1876 to 1886. Between 1886 and 1894 he was rector of St. Paul's Church, Minneapolis, Minnesota, and then dean of Grace Cathedral in Topeka, Kansas.

== Episcopacy ==
Millspaugh was elected Bishop of Kansas on May 28, 1895, and was consecrated on September 19, 1895, in Grace Cathedral with Bishop Henry Benjamin Whipple of Minnesota as chief consecrator. He remained in office until his death in Topeka on November 22, 1916.

== Personal life ==
Millspaugh married Mary Clarkson on October 20, 1882, daughter of Bishop Robert Harper Clarkson of Nebraska.
