= Episcopal Diocese of Kansas =

Diocese of the Episcopal Church in the United States

Coordinates: 39°03′03″N 95°41′02″W

Diocese of Kansas Diœcesis Kansensis

Location
- Country: United States
- Ecclesiastical province: Province VII

Statistics
- Congregations: 44 (2025)
- Members: 6,173 (2025)

Information
- Denomination: Episcopal Church
- Established: August 11, 1859
- Cathedral: Grace Cathedral, Topeka

Current leadership
- Bishop: The Rt. Rev. Cathleen Chittenden Bascom

Map
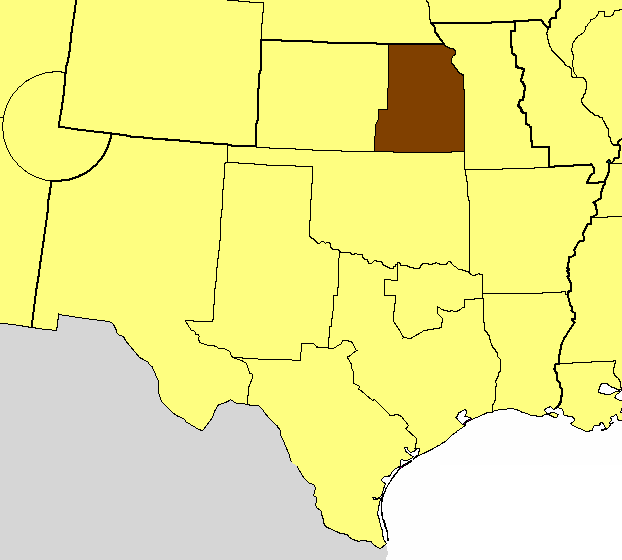
- Location of the Diocese of Kansas

Website
- episcopal-ks.org

The Episcopal Diocese of Kansas, established in 1859, is the diocese of the Episcopal Church in the United States of America with jurisdiction over eastern Kansas. It is in Province 7 and its cathedral, Grace Cathedral, is in Topeka, as are the diocesan offices.

The diocese reported 10,743 members in 2015 and 6,173 members in 2025. Plate and pledge income for the 44 filing congregations of the diocese in 2025 was $7,473,614. Average Sunday attendance (ASA) for 2025 was 2,116 persons, a decrease from 3,542 in 2015.

== Current bishop ==
The Right Reverend Cathleen Chittenden Bascom is the 10th bishop of Kansas. She was elected in 2018 and ordained and consecrated bishop on March 2, 2019.

== Bishops serving areas including the Kansas Territory ==
Jackson Kemper, (1789–1870), Missionary, Missouri-Kansas (1837–1859)

Henry Washington Lee, Missionary, Iowa - Kansas (1860–1864)

== History of the Territorial Area ==
The first Episcopal services in the Kansas Territory were conducted in 1837 by Bishop Jackson Kemper. In 1859 Bishop Kemper agreed to a convention, at which seven clergy and 11 laymen voted to form the Episcopal Diocese of Kansas. At that time the diocese was contiguous with the boundaries of the Kansas Territory. Bishop Henry Washington Lee of Iowa served as provisional bishop of Kansas from 1860 to 1864. The state of Kansas was established during this time, and in 1862 the General Convention reduced the boundaries of the diocese to conform to those of the state.

During the territorial era, the diocese formed the College of the Sisters of Bethany, an Episcopal girls school that closed in 1928.

== List of bishops ==
The bishops of Kansas have been:

1. Thomas H. Vail (1864–1889)
2. Elisha Smith Thomas (1889–1895)
3. Frank Millspaugh, (1895–1916)
4. James Wise, (1916–1939)
5. Goodrich R. Fenner (1939-1959)
6. Edward Clark Turner (1959–1981)
7. Richard F. Grein (1981–1988)
8. William E. Smalley (1989–2003)
9. Dean E. Wolfe (2004–2017)
10. Cathleen Chittenden Bascom (2019–Present)

== History of the Diocese ==
In 1864, 26 delegates from 10 organized parishes gathered at diocesan convention and elected the diocese’s first bishop, Thomas Hubbard Vail. Bishop Vail established a hospital in Topeka, Christ Hospital (the successor to that institution, Stormont-Vail Regional Medical Center, still bears his name). At the end of his episcopacy, the diocese had expanded to 138 congregations, more than 3,000 communicants and 31 clergy, plus three schools and the hospital.

The Missionary District of Salina was created from the Diocese in 1901. Its territory extends over the western 60 percent of the state and now is known as the Diocese of Western Kansas.

In June 1879, Grace Church of Topeka was designated the Cathedral of the diocese. In 1910 the foundation for the current Cathedral building was laid. By 1912, the walls had been erected but funds were depleted and further construction was halted. Fund raising efforts and leadership from Bishop Frank Millspaugh and the Rev. J. P. DeBevers Kaye, money was raised for completion of the Cathedral, with exception of the towers, in 1917.

== Churches ==
- St. Andrew's Episcopal Church, Emporia

== See also ==
- Historical list of bishops of the Episcopal Church in the United States of America
