= Grace Episcopal Cathedral (Topeka, Kansas) =

Grace Cathedral
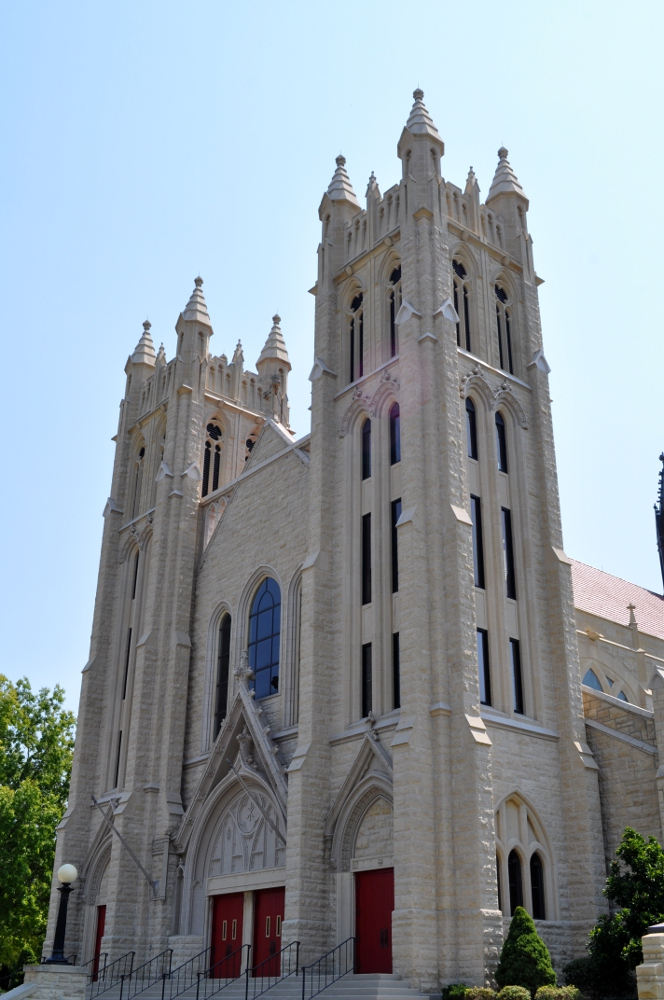

- Location within Kansas
- 39°03′3.05″N 95°41′3.3″W
- Location: 701 SW 8th Ave. Topeka, Kansas
- Country: United States
- Denomination: Episcopal Church in the United States of America
- Website: www.gracecathedraltopeka.org

History
- Founded: 1857 (as Grace Church)

Architecture
- Architect: Root & Siemens
- Style: Gothic Revival
- Groundbreaking: 1910
- Completed: 1917

Specifications
- Capacity: 1000
- Length: 160
- Width: 100
- Height: 62 Limestone High Altar 17 feet
- Materials: Limestone

Administration
- Diocese: Kansas

Clergy
- Bishop: Cathleen Chittenden Bascom
- Dean: The Very Rev. Torey Lightcap

Grace Episcopal Cathedral is located in Topeka, Kansas, United States. It is the seat of the Episcopal Diocese of Kansas. The cathedral reported 801 members in 2015 and 402 members in 2025. Plate and pledge income for the congregation in 2025 was $762,940 with average Sunday attendance (ASA) of 191. This was a relative decrease from ASA of 290 persons reported in 2016.

== History ==
Grace Cathedral started as a mission founded by the Rev. Charles M. Callaway. The first service was held on January 20, 1857 at Constitution Hall, a building used by John Farnsworth for his general merchandise business. Two years later services were moved to the Ritchie Block. The convention for the Diocese of Kansas met there on April 11 and 12, 1860 and on September 9 Grace Mission was legally incorporated as Grace Church. Bethany Place, a school for young women, had been opened the same year and was attached to Grace Church.

A new church building was completed in 1865. It contained an altar built of native walnut that has been used ever since. Grace Church was named the diocesan cathedral by the Convention of the Diocese of Kansas in June 1879. Part of the Bethany Place property was set aside for the construction of a new cathedral in 1886. Financial difficulties, however, delayed its construction. The foundation for the present cathedral was laid in 1910 and the walls were completed in 1912. The final fundraising push was initiated by Bishop Frank Rosebrook Millspaugh and Dean J. P. DeBevers Kaye. The structure was completed, minus the towers, in 1917. They were completed along with the rest of the cathedral complex under the leadership of Dean John Warren Day (1927-1957) and Dean Leslie Skerry Olsen (1957-1984). On November 26, 1975 the cathedral was extensively damaged in a fire set by an arsonist. Services were held in the Great Hall utilizing the old walnut altar, which had been saved, until the cathedral was reopened on October 1, 1978. The current building has had much work done in recent years to update and keep the maintenance up. A renovation of the 1951 Cloister building was completed in late 2014, featuring a two story tall main entrance Common Room. A capital campaign is currently underway to build a new main floor parish hall to the south onto the Bethany Place grounds of the Diocese of Kansas.

== Architecture ==
The architects of the cathedral were Root & Siemens of Kansas City. The cruciform structure was built in the Gothic Revival style. The exterior features two towers that flank the main façade. They were modeled after those of Magdalen College in Oxford, England. A 1921 history book by Dean J.P. DeBevers Kaye states, the towers of French design (eventually surmounted by spires) resemble in some respects the Church of St. Corentin, at Quimper, in Brittany. The structure is covered in Kansas Silverdale limestone quarried from St. Mary's, Kansas. A 3000-pound block of the same stone produced the free-standing High Altar. The pulpit is sandstone, removed from a redundant parish in Dewsbury, England. A handcrafted copper fleche is located at the crossing. The interior features an oak wood truss ceiling that is supported by hammered beams and columns with hand carved stone capitals. American-made stained glass windows by Judson Studios and Willet Hauser Studio illuminate the space. The organ was built in 1978 by Schantz Organ Company as Opus 1492. There are 4 manuals, 53 stops, 65 ranks, and 3820 pipes. Additions and enhancements made by Schantz and Reuter Organ Company.

== Photos ==
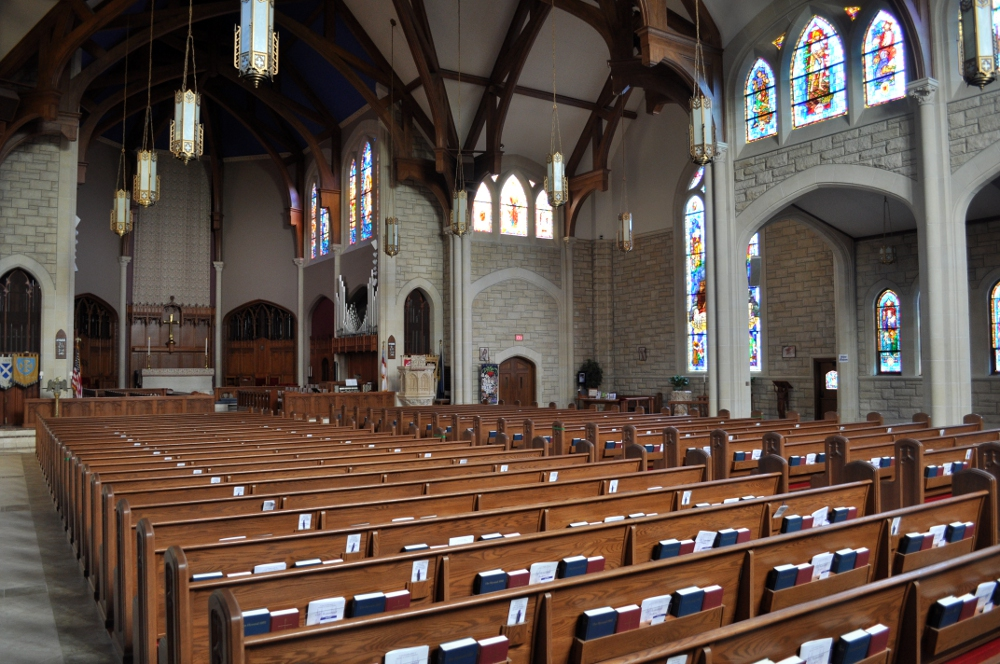
The view from the back of the nave, looking towards the sanctuary.

== See also ==
- List of the Episcopal cathedrals of the United States
- List of cathedrals in the United States
