= Episcopal Diocese of New York =

Episcopal Church diocese in the US

Coordinates: 40.8°N 73.96°W

Diocese of New York Diœcesis Neo-Eboracensis
- Seal of the Diocese of New York

Location
- Country: United States
- Territory: The Bronx, Dutchess County, Manhattan, Orange County, Putnam County, Rockland County, Staten Island, Sullivan County, Ulster County, Westchester County
- Ecclesiastical province: Province II

Statistics
- Congregations: 191 (2024)
- Members: 38,837 (2025)

Information
- Denomination: Episcopal Church
- Established: June 22, 1785
- Cathedral: Cathedral of Saint John the Divine
- Language: English, American Sign Language, French, Spanish

Current leadership
- Bishop: Matthew Heyd
- Suffragans: Allen K. Shin

Map
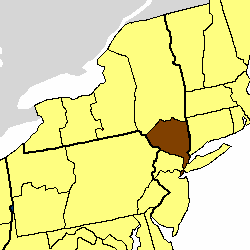

Website
- dioceseny.org

The Episcopal Diocese of New York is a diocese of the Episcopal Church in the United States of America, encompassing three New York City boroughs and seven New York state counties. Established in 1785, it is one of the Episcopal Church's original dioceses. The current diocesan bishop is the Rt. Rev. Matthew Heyd, whose seat is at the Cathedral of Saint John the Divine.

== Overview ==
The Diocese of New York contains approximately 190 places of worship in the New York City boroughs of Manhattan, the Bronx and Staten Island and the New York state counties of Dutchess, Orange, Putnam, Rockland, Sullivan, Ulster and Westchester. Beyond New York City, the diocese is divided into two regions (Region II and the Mid-Hudson Region), which are made up of geographical deaneries, each of which is known as a "clericus".

The diocese was established in 1785 after the Anglican Church was disestablished following the American Revolution, and is one of the nine original dioceses of the Episcopal Church. It is one of ten dioceses, plus the Convocation of Episcopal Churches in Europe, that make up Province 2.

The diocese is led by the Rt. Rev. Matthew Heyd, 17th Bishop of New York, who is assisted by the Rt. Rev. Allen K. Shin as bishop suffragan. The Bishop's seat is the Cathedral of St. John the Divine on Amsterdam Avenue in Manhattan, where the diocesan offices are also located. The national headquarters of the Episcopal Church are also located in the diocese, at 815 Second Avenue.

Between 2015 and 2025, reported membership decreased from 52,998 persons to 38,837. The 191 congregations of the diocese had $34,388,611 in plate and pledge income in 2024. Average Sunday Attendance (ASA) in the diocese for 2024 was 16,716 in 2015 and 9,486 in 2024.

== History ==
=== Colonial and revolutionary period ===
Anglicanism in New York can be traced to the English acquisition of the territory from the Dutch Republic in the latter part of the 17th century. In 1664 the English king, Charles II, awarded the Province of New York to his brother, the Duke of York (later James II), and English rule over New York was firmly established by 1674. Initially, since James II was a Roman Catholic, little was done to promote the Church of England in New York, but in 1683 the New York Charter of Liberties and Privileges was adopted, guaranteeing religious tolerance and liberty, and, after the Glorious Revolution, the English monarchy actively promoted the growth of the Church of England in the province. In 1693 it became the province's established church, although certain accommodations were made for the Dutch Reformed Church.

In 1693, the first Anglican parish in New York, St. Peter's Church, was founded in what was the town of Westchester (today Westchester Square in the Bronx) followed a year later by Trinity Church in lower Manhattan. With royal patronage and the assistance of the Society for the Propagation of the Gospel in Foreign Parts, other churches were founded in the ensuing decades, such as Grace Church (now Christ's Church) in Rye in 1705.

As Anglicanism grew in New York and throughout the American colonies, the Church of England began to see the need to establish an episcopate in the Americas. This plan caused fear among a number of colonists and may have contributed to the American Revolution. The Church's involvement in the creation of King's College (now Columbia University) and its large endowment, far surpassing all other colonial colleges of the period, added to the fear of creating an episcopacy and of Crown influence in America through the College.

During the Revolution, many thought that the Church harbored loyalties to George III. It has been estimated that as many as 90 percent of Anglican clergymen in the diocese remained loyal to the Crown during the revolution.

=== Post-revolutionary period ===
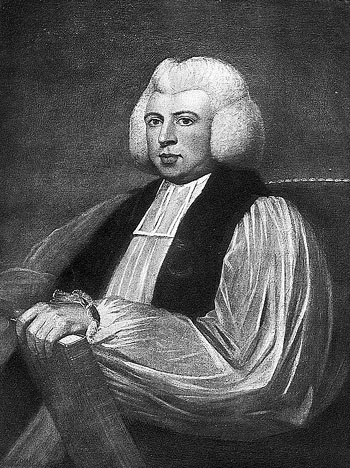
Samuel Provoost, 1st Bishop of New York and 3rd Presiding Bishop of the Episcopal Church

After the Revolution, the Church was disestablished and a number of prominent clergymen were imprisoned, including Samuel Seabury, rector of St. Peter's in the Bronx, who later became the first Bishop of Connecticut.

After an act was passed in Parliament whereby the English bishops were empowered to confer the episcopate upon men who were not subject to the British Crown, Samuel Provoost was consecrated as the first Bishop of New York in 1787. Two years later, the Episcopal Church formally separated from the Church of England so that its clergy would not be required to take an oath of allegiance to the Crown.

The selection of Provoost served to mollify anti-Anglican sentiments that had arisen during the Revolution. In his Addresses on the History of the United States Senate, Senator Robert Byrd noted that in the years before the Revolution Provoost "was a passionate Whig, and his sympathy for the colonies against English rule did not sit well with his wealthy loyalist congregation. Before long, his patriotism cost him his parish. During the Revolution, Provoost ... narrowly escaped capture and death at the hands of the British". Having thus established his revolutionary credentials, Provoost was chosen as the first chaplain of the United States Senate in 1789, when the government was based in New York. Immediately following his inauguration as the first President of the United States, George Washington, together with members of Congress, proceeded to St. Paul's Chapel, where Provoost led a service of prayer for the new government.

=== Later history ===
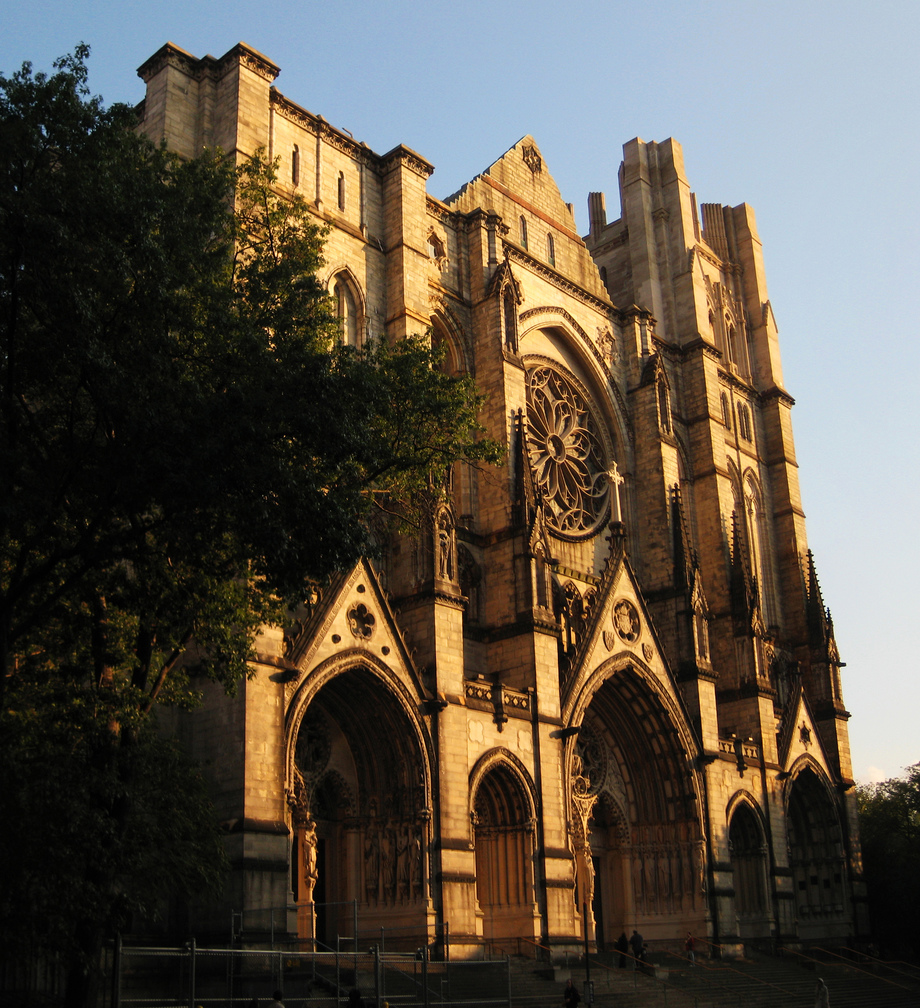
The Cathedral of Saint John the Divine, New York City, opened in 1911.

In the 1830s and 1840s the Oxford Movement caused controversies and divisions within the diocese, as it did elsewhere within the Episcopal Church and the broader Anglican communion. In New York, the divisions crystallized in a dispute over the ordination of Arthur Carey. A graduate of the General Theological Seminary, Carey had been greatly influenced by the Tracts for the Times, and as his ordination approached, he was opposed by a number of clergy and laity. Benjamin Onderdonk and other presbyters conducted an examination of Carey, which ultimately found him fit for ordination, and he was thus ordained in 1843. The dispute did not end, however, and a number of letters were published accusing Carey and ultimately Onderdonk of being overly sympathetic to Roman Catholicism. The controversy spread beyond the diocese, and at least one other diocese adopted a resolution condemning Onderdonk.

As the controversy continued, charges were presented to the House of Bishops alleging that Onderdonk had committed an "immoral act" with a Mrs. Butler and other women (charges of intoxication were also mentioned, but downplayed). After a trial, the House of Bishops suspended Onderdonk in 1845. Whether or not this was the result of the dispute over the issues raised by the Carey affair was hotly debated at the time, in a series of tracts and published letters of the parties involved.

After Onderdonk's suspension, the episcopacy was vacant for seven years until Jonathan Mayhew Wainwright I was called as Provisional Bishop in 1852. The healing work that he began in the diocese was continued by his successor, Horatio Potter, under whose leadership the Episcopal Church continued to grow. As a result of this growth, it was decided to split the diocese into four separate areas in 1868, with the creation of the dioceses of Long Island, Albany and Western New York.

Under Potter's nephew and successor, Henry Codman Potter, plans were developed and, after much deliberation, a site was chosen for the construction of the Cathedral of St. John the Divine, in the Morningside Heights area of Manhattan. The cornerstone was laid in 1892 and the Cathedral was consecrated and opened for worship in 1911.

Since the late 19th century, and especially in the mid-to-late 20th century, the diocese has been noted for its social activism, with Bishops Horace Donegan and Paul Moore, for example, prominent advocates of the civil rights movement. It was under Donegan that the diocese permitted women to serve on vestries, and under Moore ordained its first women deacons and priests. The late 20th and early 21st centuries have been marked by increased diversity. During Bishop Mark Sisk's tenure, Japanese- and Spanish-speaking congregations were established, and, as of 2022, worship services were offered in the diocese in at least 10 languages, including Spanish, French, Chinese, Japanese, Korean and Igbo. In 1996 Episcopal Charities was founded to fund local programs and, as of 2022, has provided some $17 million in support.

== Bishops of New York ==
The following have served as diocesan bishops, provisional bishops, bishops coadjutor, bishops suffragan or assistant bishops in the Diocese of New York:

=== Diocesan bishops ===
Bishops of New York
From	Until	Incumbent	Notes
1787	1815	Samuel Provoost	Also chaplain of the United States Senate 1789−1790 and presiding bishop of the Episcopal Church 1792−1795. Resigned as diocesan bishop in 1801 due to poor health but remained in office until his death.
1815	1816	Benjamin Moore	Bishop coadjutor 1801−1815 after Provoost's resignation. Father of Clement Clarke Moore.
1816	1830	John Henry Hobart	Assistant bishop in 1811 while Moore was incapacitated.
1830	1861	Benjamin Treadwell Onderdonk	Suspended in 1845 but remained in office until his death.
1852	1854	Jonathan Mayhew Wainwright I	Provisional bishop during Onderdonk's suspension.
1854	1887	Horatio Potter	Provisional bishop until 1861 during Onderdonk's suspension; then diocesan bishop.
1887	1908	Henry Codman Potter	Nephew of Horatio Potter. Assisting bishop 1883−1887.
1908	1919	David Hummell Greer	Bishop coadjutor 1904−1908.
1919	1920	Charles Sumner Burch	Bishop coadjutor 1911−1919.
1921	1946	William Thomas Manning	
1947	1950	Charles Kendall Gilbert	Bishop suffragan 1930−1946.
1950	1972	Horace William Baden Donegan	Bishop suffragan 1947−1950; bishop coadjutor 1950.
1972	1989	Paul Moore Jr.	Bishop coadjutor 1969−1972.
1989	2001	Richard Frank Grein	Bishop coadjutor 1989. Previously Bishop of Kansas 1981−1988.
2001	2013	Mark Sean Sisk	Bishop coadjutor 1998−2001.
2013	2024	Andrew Marion Lenow Dietsche	Bishop coadjutor 2012−2013.
2024	present	Matthew Foster Heyd	Bishop coadjutor 2023−2024.

=== Bishops suffragan ===
Bishops suffragan of New York
From	Until	Incumbent	Notes
1911	1919	Charles Sumner Burch	Diocesan bishop 1919−1920.
1921	1936	Arthur Selden Lloyd	Previously bishop coadjutor of Virginia 1911−1919.
1921	1930	Herbert Shipman	Sister of Mary Raymond Shipman Andrews.
1930	1946	Charles Kendall Gilbert	Diocesan bishop 1947−1950.
1947	1950	Horace William Baden Donegan	Diocesan bishop 1950−1972.
1951	1969	Charles Francis Boynton	Previously Bishop of Puerto Rico 1947−1951.
1960	1987	James Stuart Wetmore	
1969	1972	Paul Moore Jr.	Diocesan bishop 1972−1989.
1974	1978	Harold Louis Wright	
1979	1998	Walter Decoster Dennis Jr.	
1996	2012	Catherine Anna Scimeca Roskam	
2014	present	Allen Kunho Shin	

=== Assistant bishops ===
Assistant bishops of New York
From	Until	Incumbent	Notes
1811	1811	John Henry Hobart	Assistant bishop 1811; diocesan bishop 1816−1830.
1883	1887	Henry Codman Potter	Diocesan bishop 1887−1908.
1994	2009	Egbert Don Taylor	Previously Bishop of the Virgin Islands 1987−1994. Also Vicar for New York City.
1994	1998	Herbert Alcorn Donovan Jr.	Previously Bishop of Arkansas 1981−1993.
2010	2013	Andrew Donnan Smith	Previously Bishop of Connecticut 1999−2010.
2012	2012	Bruce Edward Caldwell	Previously Bishop of Wyoming 1997−2010.
2013	2014	Chilton Knudsen	Previously Bishop of Maine 1997−2008.
2016	2025	Mary Douglas Glasspool	Previously bishop suffragan of Los Angeles 2010−2016.

== Churches ==
As of 2022, there were approximately 190 Episcopal places of worship in the diocese, located in the New York boroughs of Manhattan, the Bronx and Staten Island and in the New York state counties of Dutchess, Orange, Putnam, Rockland, Sullivan and Ulster and Westchester. They include the following, some of which may no longer be active:

=== New York City ===
==== Manhattan ====
- All Angels' Church
- All Saints' Church
- All Souls' Church
- Calvary Church
- Chapel of the Good Shepherd
- Christ and St. Stephen's Church
- Church of Our Saviour
- Church of St. Luke in the Fields
- Church of St. Mary the Virgin
- Church of the Ascension
- Church of the Crucifixion
- Church of the Epiphany
- Church of the Good Shepherd
- Church of the Heavenly Rest
- Church of the Holy Apostles
- Church of the Holy Communion (defunct)
- Church of the Holy Trinity
- Church of the Incarnation
- Church of the Intercession
- Church of the Resurrection
- Church of the Transfiguration
- Grace Church
- Holyrood Church
- St. Ambrose Church
- St. Andrew's Church
- St. Ann's Church
- St. Augustines's Church
- St. Bartholomew's Church
- St. Clement's Church
- St. Edward the Martyr Church
- French Church du Saint-Esprit
- St. George's Church
- St. Ignatius of Antioch Church
- St. James's Church
- St. John's Church
- St. Luke's Church (defunct)
- St. Mark's Church in-the-Bowery
- St. Martin's Church
- St. Matthew and St. Timothy Church
- St. Mary's Church, Manhattanville
- St. Michael's Church
- St. Paul's Chapel
- St. Peter's Church
- St. Philip's Church
- St. Saviour Church
- St. Thomas Church
- Trinity Church

==== Staten Island ====
- All Saints' Church
- Christ Church
- Church of the Ascension
- St. Alban's Church
- St. Andrew's Church
- St. Mary's, Castleton
- St. Paul's Church
- St. John's Church
- St. Simon's Church (defunct)
- St. Stephen's Church (defunct)

==== The Bronx ====
- Christ Church
- Church of the Atonement
- Church of the Good Shepherd
- Church of the Mediator
- Grace Church, City Island
- Grace Church, West Farms
- Haitian Congregation of the Good Samaritan
- Holy Nativity Church
- St. Ann's Church
- St. Andrew's Church
- St. David's Church
- St. Edmund's/St. Mary's Church
- St. James's Church
- St. Joseph's Church
- San Juan Bautista Church
- St. Luke's Church
- St. Margaret's/San Juan Bautista Church
- St. Martha's/St. Simeon's Church
- St. Paul's Church
- St. Peter's Church
- St. Stephen's Church
- Trinity Church of Morrisania (defunct 2023)

=== Dutchess County ===
- Christ Church/Virgen de Guadalupe, Poughkeepsie
- Christ Church, Red Hook
- Church of the Messiah, Rhinebeck
- Church of the Regeneration, Pine Plains
- Church of the Resurrection, Hopewell Junction
- Grace Church, Millbrook
- Holy Trinity Church, Pawling
- La Mesa Church, Dover Plains
- St. Andrew's Church, Beacon
- St. Andrew's Church, Poughkeepsie
- St. James' Church, Hyde Park
- St. John the Evangelist, Barrytown
- St. Andrew and St. Luke Church, Beacon
- St. Margaret of Antioch Church, Staatsburg
- St. Mark's Church, Chelsea
- St. Nicholas-on-the-Hudson, New Hamburg
- St. Paul's Church, Pleasant Valley
- St. Paul's Church, Poughkeepsie
- St. Paul's and Trinity Church, Tivoli
- St. Peter's Church, Lithgow
- St. Thomas Church, Amenia
- Trinity Church, Fishkill
- Zion, Wappingers Falls

=== Orange County ===
- Christ Church, Warwick
- Church of the Good Shepherd/Buen Pastor, Newburgh
- Church of the Good Shepherd, Greenwood Lake
- Church of the Holy Innocents, Highland Falls
- Grace Church, Middletown
- Grace Church, Monroe
- Grace Church, Port Jervis
- St. Andrew's Church, Walden
- St. Anne's Church, Washingtonville
- St. Francis of Assisi Church, Montgomery
- St. George's Church, Newburgh
- St. James's Church, Goshen
- St. John's Church, Arden
- St. John's Church, Cornwall
- St. Mark's Church, Fort Montgomery
- St. Mary's Church, Tuxedo
- St. Paul's Church, Chester
- St. Thomas Church, New Windsor

=== Putnam County ===
- Christ Church, Patterson (defunct)
- Church of the Holy Communion, Mahopac
- St. Andrew's Church, Brewster (defunct)
- St. Mary's Church, Cold Spring
- St. Philip's Church, Garrison

=== Rockland County ===
- All Saints' Church, Valley Cottage
- Christ Church, Sparkhill
- Christ Church, Suffern
- Church of St. John the Divine, Tompkins Cove
- Grace Church, Nyack
- St. John's Church, New City
- St. John's Church, Stony Point
- St. Paul's Church, Spring Valley
- St. Stephen's Church, Pearl River
- Trinity Church, Garnerville

=== Sullivan County ===
- St. Andrew's Church, South Fallsburg
- St. James's Church, Callicoon
- St. John's Church, Monticello

=== Ulster County ===
- Ascension Church, West Park
- Christ Church, Marlboro
- Christ the King Church, Stone Ridge
- Holy Cross/Santa Cruz Church, Kingston
- Holy Trinity Church, Highland
- St. Andrew's Church, New Paltz
- St. Gregory's Church, Woodstock
- St. John's Church, Ellenville
- St. John's Church, Kingston
- Stone Church, Cragsmoor (defunct)
- Trinity Church, Saugerties

=== Westchester County ===
- All Saints' Church, Briarcliff
- All Saints' Church, Harrison
- Christ Church, Bronxville
- Christ Church/San Marcos, Tarrytown
- Christ's Church, Rye
- Church of Christ the Redeemer, Pelham
- Church of St. Mary the Virgin, Chappaqua
- Church of St. Simon the Cyrenian, New Rochelle
- Church of Saints John, Paul and Clement, Mount Vernon
- Church of the Ascension, Mount Vernon
- Church of the Divine Love, Montrose
- Church of the Good Shepherd, Granite Springs
- Grace Church, Hastings-on-Hudson
- Grace Church, Ossining
- Grace Church/La Gracia, White Plains
- Holy Cross Church, Yonkers
- San Andres Church, Yonkers
- St. Andrew's Church, Hartsdale
- St. Augustine's Church, Croton-on-Hudson
- St. Barnabas's Church, Ardsley
- St. Barnabas's Church, Irvington
- St. Bartholomew's Church, White Plains
- St. Francis and St. Martha's Church, White Plains
- St. James's Church, North Salem
- St. James the Less, Scarsdale
- St. John's Church and St. Paul's Chapel, South Salem
- St. John's Church, Larchmont
- St. John's Church, Pleasantville
- St. John's Church, Tuckahoe
- St. John's Church, Yonkers
- St. John's Wilmot Church, New Rochelle
- St. Joseph of Arimathea Church, White Plains
- St. Luke's Church, Eastchester
- St. Luke's Church, Katonah
- St. Luke's Church, Somers
- St. Mark's Church, Mount Kisco
- St. Mark's Church, Yonkers
- St. Mary's Church, Mohegan Lake
- St. Matthew's Church, Bedford
- St. Paul's Church, Yonkers
- St. Peter's Church, Peekskill
- St. Peter's Church, Port Chester
- St. Stephen's Church, Armonk
- St. Thomas Church, Mamaroneck
- Trinity Church, Mount Vernon
- Trinity-St. Paul's Church, New Rochelle
- Zion Church, Dobbs Ferry

== Educational and other institutions ==
=== Schools ===
The following schools are located within the Diocese of New York and affiliated with the Episcopal Church:

- Saint Thomas Choir School, New York City
- St. Hilda's & St. Hugh's School, New York City
- The Cathedral School of St. John the Divine, New York City
- The Episcopal School in the City of New York, New York City
- Trinity-Pawling School, Pawling, New York

=== Spiritual communities ===
Anglican spiritual communities and religious orders active within the Diocese of New York include:

- Brotherhood of Saint Gregory, New York City
- Community of the Holy Spirit, New York City and Brewster
- Holy Cross Monastery, West Park
- House of the Redeemer, New York City
- Incarnation Center, New York City
- Society of Saint Margaret, New York City

=== Organizations ===
- Bible and Common Prayer Book Society
- House of the Redeemer at Edith Fabbri House
