= Harold Louis Wright =

Bishop

The Right Reverend Harold Louis Wright Jr. S.T.D.
- Suffragan Bishop of New York
- Church: Episcopal Church
- Diocese: New York
- Elected: 1973
- In office: 1974–1978
- Predecessor: Paul Moore Jr.
- Successor: Walter Dennis

Orders
- Ordination: 1957 by Jonathan G. Sherman
- Consecration: February 2, 1974 by Paul Moore Jr.

Personal details
- Born: 1929 Boston, Massachusetts, United States
- Died: June 11, 1978 (aged 48) New York City, New York, United States
- Buried: Holy Cross Monastery (West Park, New York)
- Denomination: Anglican
- Spouse: Edith Yancey
- Children: 4
- Education: Boston University

Harold Louis Wright Jr. (1929 – June 11, 1978) was an American prelate who served as the Suffragan Bishop of New York from 1974 until 1978.

== Biography ==
Wright was born in 1929 in Boston, Massachusetts. He was educated at the Boston public schools and later at the New England Conservatory of Music. He also studied at Boston University and graduated with a Bachelor of Arts. He enrolled for theological studies at the General Theological Seminary from where he earned his Bachelor of Sacred Theology in 1952.

Wright was ordained deacon and priest in 1957 by Bishop Jonathan G. Sherman, Suffragan of Long Island. He then became vicar and then rector of the Church of the Resurrection in Queens, New York City. Between 1970 and 1974 he served as assistant to the Bishop of New York for Ministries.

In 1973, Wright was elected Suffragan Bishop of New York and was consecrated on February 2, 1974, in the Cathedral of St. John the Divine by Bishop Paul Moore Jr. of New York, and assisted by John Burgess of Massachusetts, Horace W. B. Donegan the former Bishop of New York, Quintin E. Primo Jr. the Suffragan of Chicago, John T. Walker the Suffragan of Washington, and Richard Beamon Martin the Suffragan of Long Island. Bishop Wright died a few years later, on June 11, 1978, in Queens Hospital Center after a heart attack.
