= House at 383 Main Street =

Historic house in New York, United States

- U.S. National Register of Historic Places
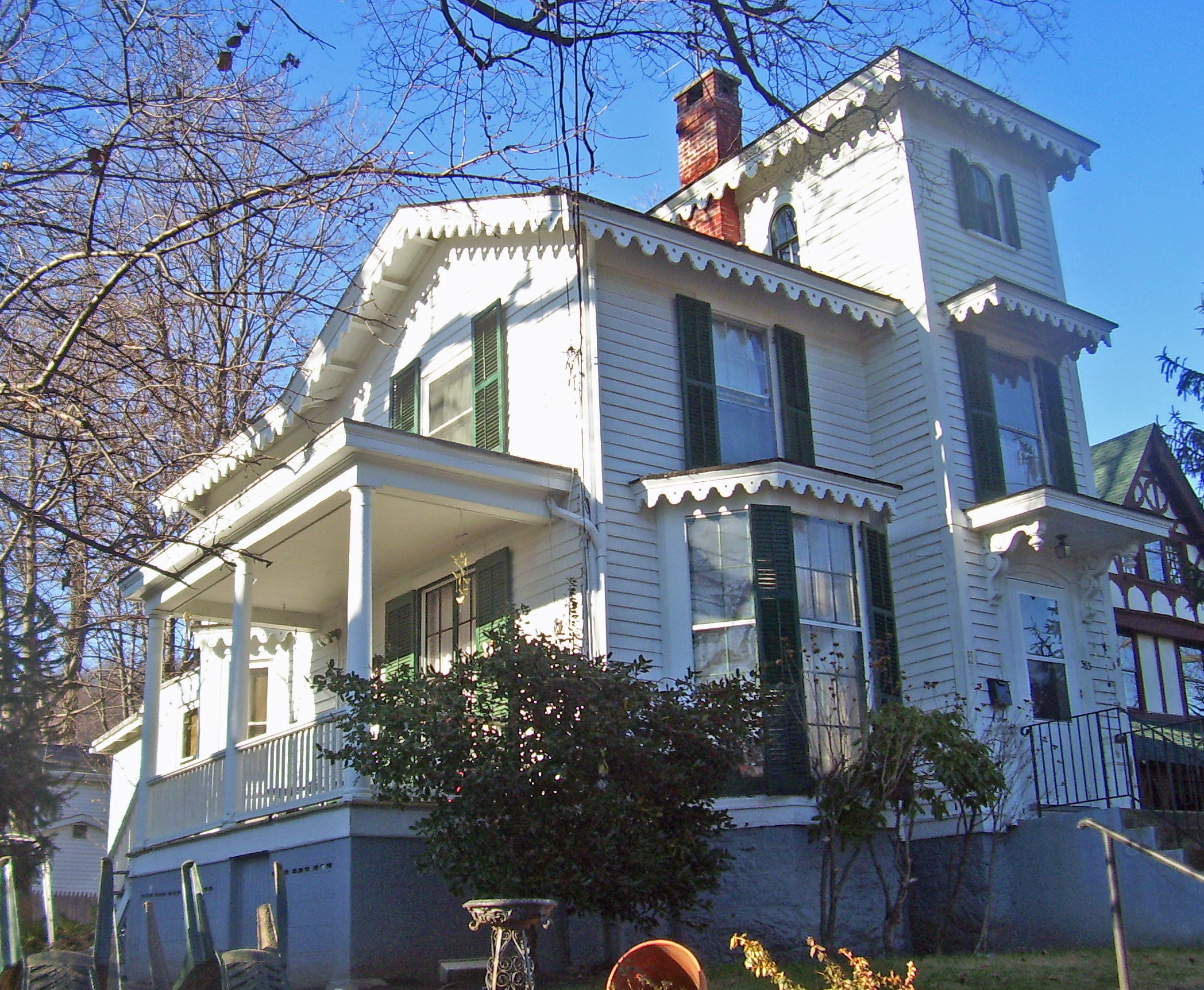
- East elevation and south profile, 2008

- Location within New York Location within the United States
- Location: Highland Falls, NY
- Nearest city: Peekskill
- Coordinates: 41°22′21″N 73°57′51″W
- Built: 1865
- Architectural style: Italian Villa
- MPS: Hudson Highlands MRA
- NRHP reference No.: 82001221
- Added to NRHP: November 23, 1982

The house at 383 Main Street, formerly 116 Main Street in Highland Falls, New York, United States, is an Italian Villa style building dating to the mid-19th century. It may have originally been built as the rectory for the nearby Church of the Holy Innocents.

It is considered the most accomplished house in that style in the village. In 1982 it was listed on the National Register of Historic Places along with over 50 other historic properties in the Hudson Highlands.

== Building ==
The house is on a small lot on the east side of Main north of Cozzens Avenue, just north of downtown. Across Main and West Point Highway is the Thayer Hotel and other buildings and parking lots associated with the United States Military Academy. To the north is Holy Innocents' current Tudorbethan rectory. Tall trees screen the house slightly from the house on the corner just to the south. More houses are located to the east.

The building itself is a two-story clapboard-sided frame structure on a stone foundation. A projecting three-story tower with brick chimney rises from the northeast corner. The main block has a shallow pitched side-gabled roof. A flat-roofed veranda with three Doric columns and a plain rail is on the south. On the west is a sympathetic newer extension, with a similar extension on its own west.

Both the main entrance and the window above it have flat-roofed hoods, the lower one supported by console brackets with pendants. A projecting bay window is on the south of the main entrance, with another on the south facade west of the veranda. All rooflines and cornices save the veranda and the hood on the main entrance have a simple cut molding.

== History ==
The house was built in the 1860s. Its earliest recorded owner is a "J.W." in 1875. In 1891 a map shows it as part of the Holy Innocents' property; its proximity to the current rectory suggests it may have been used in that capacity at that time.

At some point later the two rear wings were built. It has remained largely intact otherwise. In the late 20th century, after it had been listed on the National Register, the streets in Highland Falls were renumbered for 9-1-1 purposes and the house became 365 Main Street. The number was later changed to 383 Main Street.

== See also ==
- National Register of Historic Places listings in Orange County, New York
