= Church of the Holy Innocents (Highland Falls, New York) =

Historic church in New York, United States

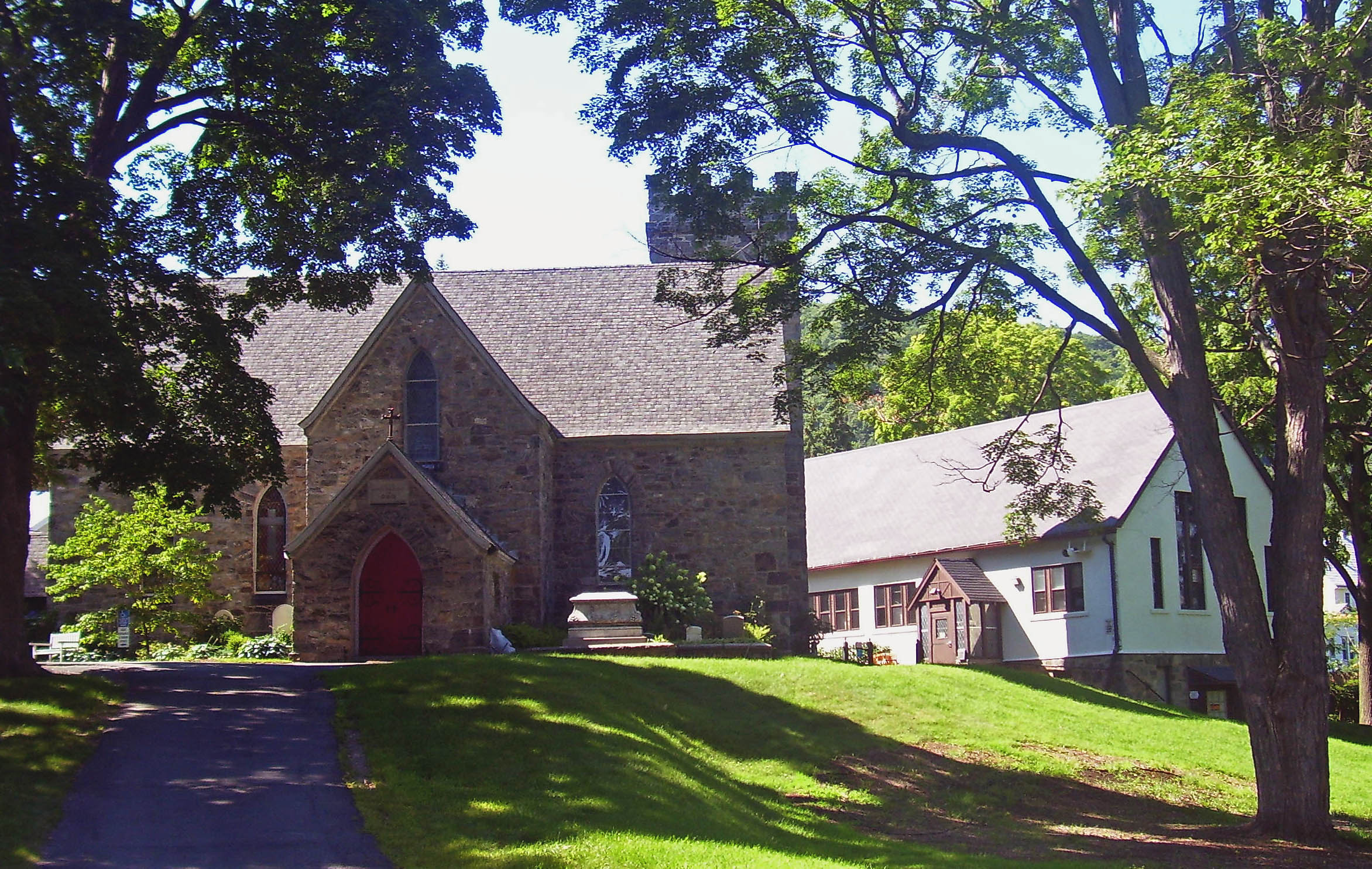
- East elevation, 2007

Religion
- Affiliation: Episcopal Church
- Leadership: The Rev. Jan Nunley
- Year consecrated: 1847

Location
- Location: Highland Falls, NY, USA
- Interactive map of Church of the Holy Innocents
- Coordinates: 41°22′25″N 73°57′53″W

Architecture
- Architect: Robert Walter Weir
- Style: Tudor Revival, Gothic Revival
- Groundbreaking: 1846
- Completed: 1847

Specifications
- Direction of façade: east
- Materials: stone, wood, stucco

U.S. National Register of Historic Places
- Added to NRHP: November 23, 1982
- NRHP Reference no.: 82001213

Website
- Holy Innocents Episcopal Church

The Church of the Holy Innocents is located on Main Street in Highland Falls, New York, United States, not far from the main gate of the United States Military Academy and right across from the West Point Museum. It is an Episcopal church, established in 1841. The building, designed by Robert Walter Weir, a Hudson River School painter then employed as an instructor at the academy, was completed five years later and consecrated in 1847. The name "Holy Innocents" came from Weir's children, who died young.

It became the popular place of worship for affluent city residents who summered along the Hudson River. Among them was J. Pierpont Morgan, who funded the construction of the rectory, a Tudor addition to the church. After his death, his family continued the tradition, endowing a Louis Comfort Tiffany stained-glass window depicting Creation.

The church and its Tudorbethan rectory were listed as Church of the Holy Innocents and Rectory on the National Register of Historic Places in 1982.

It is a parish of the Episcopal Diocese of New York.

== Buildings and grounds ==
The church property is a 17-acre (6.9 ha) lot between Main and Church streets north of Cozzens Avenue. To the west the ground descends slightly to the Thayer Hotel, West Point Museum, and other facilities associated with the United States Military Academy. Main north of the property is largely commercial, but all the other streets immediately adjacent to the church are residential.

Large mature trees shade the landscaped eastern portion of the property. The church is located near the northwestern corner, with a parking lot to the south accessible from Main Street. The rectory is in the southeast corner, just next to the Italian villa-style house at 365 Main Street, itself listed on the National Register.

The church building is a stone one-story structure with steeply pitched gabled roof and flared overhanging eaves. It is oriented northeast–southwest so that the chancel faces Jerusalem. A crenellated stone tower is located on the north corner. A parish room and sacristy are located in the extensions along Church Street from the western corner.

A stone porch with an extension projects from the east wing, providing the main entrance. Above the entrance on the wing is a lancet window, like those flanking the porch and running along the west elevation. On the north profile is a three-part stained glass window.

The rectory is a two-story house on a stone foundation faced in stucco and half-timber. Its multiply gabled roofs have flared, overhanging eaves and exposed rafters. On the north facade is a two-story projecting rounded bay sided in shingles. The main entrance has stained glass sidelights and flanking windows.

== See also ==
- Hudson Highlands Multiple Resource Area
- National Register of Historic Places listings in Orange County, New York
