= Walter Dennis =

Bishop of the Episcopal Diocese of New York

The Right Reverend Walter Decoster Dennis D.D.
- Suffragan Bishop of New York
- Church: Episcopal Church
- Diocese: New York
- Elected: 1979
- In office: 1979–1998
- Predecessor: Harold Louis Wright
- Successor: Catherine S. Roskam

Orders
- Ordination: June 1958 by Horace W. B. Donegan
- Consecration: October 6, 1979 by Paul Moore Jr.

Personal details
- Born: August 23, 1932 Washington, D.C., United States
- Died: March 30, 2003 (aged 70) Hampton, Virginia, United States
- Denomination: Anglican
- Parents: Walter Decoster Dennis Sr. & Helen Louise Maddux

Walter Decoster Dennis, Jr. (August 23, 1932 – March 30, 2003) was a suffragan bishop of the Episcopal Diocese of New York, from 1979 to 1998.

== Early life and education ==
Dennis was born on August 23, 1932, in Washington, D.C., the son of Walter Decoster Dennis Sr. and Helen Maddux. He studied at the Virginia State College, from where he graduated with a Bachelor of Arts in 1952. He then studied at the New York University and graduated with a Master of Arts in North American history and constitutional law in 1953. Later on, he enrolled at the General Theological Seminary and earned his Bachelor of Sacred Theology in 1956. In 1972 he also earned a postgraduate diploma from New York University.

== Priest ==
Dennis was ordained deacon on June 15, 1956, at Grace Church in Norfolk, Virginia, by Bishop George P. Gunn of Southern Virginia. He then became curate at St Philip's Church in Brooklyn, New York City, and in September of that year became curate at the Cathedral of St. John the Divine. During his time at the cathedral, he was ordained priest in June 1958 by Bishop Horace W. B. Donegan of New York. In 1960 he became vicar of St Cyprian's Church in Hampton, Virginia, and between 1961 and 1965, he also served as assistant professor of history and constitutional law at the Hampton Institute. In 1965, he returned to New York City and became residentiary canon of the cathedral chapter of the Cathedral of St. John the Divine. During that time he became well known for his involvement in social issues and civil rights. He also taught Christian Ethics at the General Theological Seminary.

== Bishop ==
Dennis was elected on the third ballot as Suffragan Bishop of New York, during a special convention of the Diocese of New York in 1979. He was consecrated at the Cathedral of St. John the Divine on October 6, 1979, by Bishop Paul Moore Jr. of New York. Dennis was favored by many to be elected as diocesan bishop during the 1989 election, however he withdrew the nomination citing medical reasons. He retained the post till his retirement in 1998. He died on March 30, 2003, in Hampton, Virginia.

== Dennis Canon ==
He drafted the "Dennis Canon" which seeks to impose a trust, in favor of the Episcopal Church, on property held by a local group of Episcopal adherents. Its intended effect is to discourage a local group from withdrawing from the Episcopal Church, as under the Dennis Canon such property would revert to the Episcopal Church.
