= J. Stuart Wetmore =

Suffragan Episcopal bishop of New York State

The Right Reverend James Stuart Wetmore D.D.
- Suffragan Bishop of New York
- Church: Episcopal Church
- Diocese: New York
- Elected: December 1959
- In office: 1960–1987
- Predecessor: Charles F. Boynton
- Successor: Paul Moore, Jr.

Orders
- Ordination: December 17, 1939 by William Moorhead
- Consecration: March 25, 1960 by Arthur C. Lichtenberger

Personal details
- Born: October 22, 1915 Hampton, New Brunswick, Canada
- Died: December 28, 1999 (aged 84) Poughkeepsie, New York, United States
- Denomination: Anglican
- Parents: Charles Talbot Wetmore & Alberta Mae McCordic
- Spouse: Frances Howard Robinson (m. 1940)
- Children: 5

James Stuart Wetmore or J. Stuart Wetmore (October 22, 1915 - December 28, 1999) was an Episcopal Bishop in the Diocese of New York.

== Family ==
Born to Charles Talbot and Alberta Mae Wetmore, Wetmore became a deacon in 1938 and was ordained a priest in 1939 for the Diocese of Fredericton of the Anglican Church of Canada. He was descended from the Rev. James Wetmore, an early rector of Grace Church (now Christ's Church) in Rye, New York (1723–1760).

== Early career ==
Wetmore was ordained a deacon in December, 1938. His Canadian assignments included field secretary and general secretary of the General Board of Religious Education of the Church of England in Canada. He traveled constantly through eastern Canada and Newfoundland, building up local Christian formation programs and stimulating the creation of regional programs such as Camp Medley in Upper Gagetown, New Brunswick. He moved to the United States in 1953, serving as director of Christian education of the Diocese of New York until 1960.

He was named a canon of the Cathedral of Saint John the Divine, New York in 1959, and was elected and ordained suffragan bishop in December of that year. He is noted for serving longer than any other in that capacity, for twenty-seven years, retiring in 1987.

== Health issues ==
In 1963, Wetmore collapsed at a Christmas service at the cathedral and was taken to the hospital. Although the immediate diagnosis was heat exhaustion, the medical examination revealed that he was suffering from cancer of the larynx. After surgery to remove the cancer (and one vocal cord), Wetmore had to cope for the rest of his ministry with a voice which was faint and hoarse. For several years he made use of his own portable sound system, as voice amplification was rare in smaller churches in the diocese at that time, to continue to be able to preach and lead worship.

== Interfaith ministry ==
Wetmore was the first non-Roman Catholic to preach from the pulpit of St. Patrick's Cathedral, in 1968; he "began to receive mail and telephone messages urging me to withdraw my acceptance of the invitation," but nevertheless agreed to speak at the annual Octave of Christian Unity observance on Jan. 25 of that year. Additionally, he chaired the diocesan Ecumenical Commission from 1969 to 1988, and served as director of the Council of Churches of New York State from 1965 to 1968.

He was a founding director of the Council of Churches of the City of New York, serving from 1960 to 1988. In that capacity he worked with Joachim Fiorillo, director of development for the council, to create the Society for the Family of Man, which Fiorillo initially envisioned, and was crystallized in the society's first awards dinner, honoring John F. Kennedy in November, 1963.

Wetmore served as chair of the committee that oversaw the construction and functioning of the Protestant and Orthodox pavilion at the 1964-1965 New York World's Fair. One of his key contributions was successfully lobbying for the showing of the controversial short film, "Parable" at the pavilion, instead of the proposed dramatic readings from famous sermons.

== Family ==
Wetmore married Frances Howard Robinson in 1940. Together they had five children, and at the time of his death Wetmore had eleven grandchildren and two great-grandchildren.
