= Dennis Canon =

Part of the canon of the Episcopal Church (United States)

The Dennis Canon is a common (though unofficial and unfavored) name used for Title I.7.4 (as presently numbered) of the Canons of the Episcopal Church in the United States of America (also called The Episcopal Church, or TEC).

The Canon seeks to impose a trust in favor of the Episcopal Church, on property held by a local group of Episcopal adherents (whether a parish, mission, or congregation). The Canon's intended effect is to discourage a local group from withdrawing from the Episcopal Church, as under the Dennis Canon such property would revert to the Episcopal Church.

In light of the larger doctrinal controversies surrounding the Episcopal Church, and the decision of some local congregations (and dioceses) to withdraw from the Episcopal Church, the Canon has surfaced in litigation between church or diocese factions regarding ownership of property.

== Canon text ==
The Canon states:

All real and personal property held by or for the benefit of any Parish, Mission, or Congregation is held in trust for this Church [i.e., the Episcopal Church] and the Diocese thereof in which such Parish, Mission or Congregation is located. The existence of this trust, however, shall in no way limit the power and authority of the Parish, Mission or Congregation otherwise existing over such property so long as the particular Parish, Mission or Congregation remains a part of, and subject to, this Church and its Constitution and Canons.

== History and purpose ==
The Dennis Canon is named after Walter Dennis, an attorney and later Suffragan Bishop of New York, who drafted the Canon. It was passed by the 66th General Convention in 1979, having been introduced by the Committee on Canons of the House of Bishops as D-024 of that Convention.

During the turbulent 1960s and 1970s, some parishes left the Episcopal Church and attempted to retain the parish property for reasons including the admission of women to Holy Orders, the adoption of the 1979 Book of Common Prayer, and the belief that some bishops held heretical views.

In 1979, the United States Supreme Court ruled in Jones v. Wolf that the "neutral principles of law" approach to deciding property disputes between factions of a church offered advantages versus other means (which may have required involvement in matters of purely religious affairs, an exercise which was prohibited by the First Amendment):

The primary advantages of the neutral principles approach are that it is completely secular in operation, and yet flexible enough to accommodate all forms of religious organization and polity. The method relies exclusively on objective, well established concepts of trust and property law familiar to lawyers and judges. It thereby promises to free civil courts completely from entanglement in questions of religious doctrine, polity, and practice. Furthermore, the neutral principles analysis shares the peculiar genius of private law systems in general -- flexibility in ordering private rights and obligations to reflect the intentions of the parties. Through appropriate reversionary clauses and trust provisions, religious societies can specify what is to happen to church property in the event of a particular contingency, or what religious body will determine the ownership in the event of a schism or doctrinal controversy. In this manner, a religious organization can ensure that a dispute over the ownership of church property will be resolved in accord with the desires of the members.

The Supreme Court went on to state (in response to the dissent):

The neutral principles approach cannot be said to "inhibit" the free exercise of religion, any more than do other neutral provisions of state law governing the manner in which churches own property, hire employees, or purchase goods. Under the neutral principles approach, the outcome of a church property dispute is not foreordained. At any time before the dispute erupts, the parties can ensure, if they so desire, that the faction loyal to the hierarchical church will retain the church property. They can modify the deeds or the corporate charter to include a right of reversion or trust in favor of the general church. Alternatively, the constitution of the general church can be made to recite an express trust in favor of the denominational church. The burden involved in taking such steps will be minimal. And the civil courts will be bound to give effect to the result indicated by the parties, provided it is embodied in some legally cognizable form.

As such, the Dennis Canon was written in response to the Supreme Court's ruling, by modifying TEC's Canons in an attempt to create an express trust in favor of TEC should a faction of a local parish seek to withdraw from TEC. The Episcopal Church maintains that, legally, any officer of any official institution must maintain his or her fiduciary trust responsibility on behalf of the Episcopal Church.

== Litigation ==
In recent years, some Episcopalians have challenged the Episcopal Church over its doctrine, discipline, and worship. Because of these disputes, parishes and five entire dioceses have made attempts to sever ties with the rest of the Episcopal Church. The Episcopal Church maintains that these groups cannot dissociate, only individuals can. Therefore, Episcopal Church leaders assert that they have attempted to take property and assets with them. Those groups that have left maintain that most of these properties and assets were established long before the Dennis Canon by loyal Episcopalians that would not recognize the theological innovations of the modern Episcopal Church.

To date, there have been a number of court cases either challenging or seeking to enforce the Dennis Canon and few of them are entirely resolved.

=== Virginia ===
In the Commonwealth of Virginia, where a Civil War era "division statute", concerning denominations that split in two, has ruled in favor of the Episcopal Church (though the question of the Episcopal Church's trust interest was not ultimately addressed). The congregations seeking to leave (which include, among others, The Falls Church, the historic congregation for which the city of Falls Church, Virginia is named, and where George Mason and George Washington were once members) had their initial court victory overruled when using the "division statute" by the Virginia Supreme Court in 2010, which held that the statute did not apply because instead of simply leaving the Episcopal denomination to form their own organization, the churches instead joined another organization affiliated with the Church of Nigeria, which had never been part of the Protestant Episcopal Church even though both were descended from the Church of England. In January, 2012, the Fairfax Circuit Court issued an order implementing the Supreme Court's decision. Some of the churches in the suit have reached settlements with the Diocese, but others have appealed.

=== South Carolina ===
Another case is All Saints Parish in Waccamaw, South Carolina. In this case, the Parish of All Saints won ownership of all property and assets after a lengthy court battle that was ultimately decided by the Supreme Court of South Carolina. Following "neutral principles of law," the state Supreme Court held that, since the parish existed before the formation of either the diocese or the Episcopal Church, and in light of an earlier quitclaim deed, the Dennis Canon did not apply. The local State court held that "It is an axiomatic principle of law that a person or entity must hold title to property in order to declare that it is held in trust for the benefit of another or transfer legal title to one person for the benefit of another."

Subsequent to that case, the Diocese of South Carolina voted in 2012 to dissociate from the Episcopal Church. The legal battle over the church properties has lasted more than a decade. In April 2022, the South Carolina Supreme Court seemingly ended the legal battle when it held that the fourteen of 29 congregations that split from the Episcopal Diocese of South Carolina which did not explicitly concede to the Dennis Canon were required to give their properties back to the Episcopal Diocese. The court explicitly stated the case was over and there would be no remands. In June 2022, the court granted petitions for rehearing from seven parishes that argued they had not expressly agreed to the Canon.

=== Georgia and Connecticut ===
Two churches (from Georgia and Connecticut), where the state Supreme Courts ruled in favor of the Episcopal Church and the Canon, asked the U.S. Supreme Court to hear their appeals.

The U.S. Supreme Court denied certiorari in the Connecticut case while the Georgia case was dismissed by the Supreme Court pursuant to its Rule 46.

=== Texas ===
Two cases from Texas involving breakaway groups, and ultimately ownership to church property, were decided in August 2013; in both cases the Texas Supreme Court remanded the cases to the trial court. In its orders, the Court ruled that the "neutral principles" methodology would apply in these and all future cases involving religious groups:

- The first case involves the Episcopal Diocese of Fort Worth (ACNA Diocese), which (along with the majority of the parishes) broke away from the Episcopal Church. The ACNA Diocese amended its corporate charter in 2006 to remove all references to the Episcopal Church, and during 2007 and 2008 formally withdrew from the Episcopal Church, joined with the Anglican Province of the Southern Cone, and amended its constitution to remove all references to the Episcopal Church. The Episcopal Church countered by holding a February 2009 meeting of members remaining loyal to the Episcopal Church, revoking the actions taken during 2007 and 2008 and declaring the loyal members (and those parishes not breaking away) to constitute the "true" Episcopal Diocese, and filing suit against the ACNA Diocese seeking title to property. The trial court ruled for the Episcopal Church; the ACNA Diocese took a direct appeal to the Texas Supreme Court, which ruled 5-4 to remand the case to the trial court.
- The second case involves a single parish within the Episcopal Diocese of Northwest Texas. The Episcopal Church of the Good Shepherd, a parish located in San Angelo, held a business meeting on November 12, 2006 and voted to 1) amend its corporate charter and bylaws to remove references to the Episcopal Church and the Diocese, 2) withdraw from the Episcopal Church and the Diocese, and 3) rename itself as "Anglican Church of the Good Shepherd" and amend its corporate charter to the new name. The changes were to be effective on January 5, 2007. Before that date, the Diocese bishop ruled that the parish could not unilaterally withdraw from the Diocese, held a meeting with members remaining loyal to the Diocese and elected a new priest, and filed suit seeking title to the property. The trial court ruled in favor of the Diocese and the court of appeals affirmed. The Texas Supreme Court ruled 7-2 to remand to the trial court.

The Texas cases and the "neutral principles of law" approach that the Texas Supreme Court ordered the trial court to use appears to favor the break-away groups and calls into question the enforceability or legal solidity of the Canon.
