= Allen K. Shin =

Korean-American Bishop

The Right Reverend Allen Kunho Shin
- Suffragan Bishop of New York
- Church: Episcopal Church
- Diocese: New York
- Elected: December 7, 2013
- In office: 2014–present
- Predecessor: Catherine S. Roskam

Orders
- Ordination: June 15, 1996 (deacon); December 7, 1996 (priest)
- Consecration: May 17, 2014 by Katharine Jefferts Schori

Personal details
- Born: South Korea
- Denomination: Anglican
- Spouse: Clara Mun (m. 1991)

Allen Kunho Shin is a Korean-American bishop of the Episcopal Church who is the current Suffragan Bishop of New York.

== Education and ministry ==
He was born in Seoul in 1956. Shin graduated with a Bachelor of Arts in Music and Vocal Performance from Eastern Michigan University in 1983 and with a Master of Divinity from General Theological Seminary in 1996. He also earned a Master of Sacred Theology from General in 2001.

After completing his studies at the General Theological Seminary, he was ordained to the diaconate on June 15, 1996, and to the priesthood on December 7, 1996. Between 1996 and 1999, he served as assistant officer of the Episcopal Asian American Ministry at the Episcopal Church Center in New York City. From 1996 to 2001, he also served as curate at the Church of Saint Mary the Virgin in New York City. In 2001, he moved to England to study for a Post-Graduate Research in Patristic Studies at the University of Oxford. He also served as honorary assistant of All Saints, Margaret Street, in London from 2002 to 2005. In 2005, he then became a fellow and chaplain at Keble College, Oxford, a post he kept until 2010. In 2010, he moved back to the United States and became rector of St John's Church in Huntington, New York.

On December 7, 2013, Shin was elected Suffragan Bishop of New York during a special convention held at the Cathedral of St. John the Divine. He was consecrated on May 17, 2014, by Presiding Bishop Katharine Jefferts Schori.

He is a board member of the Bible and Common Prayer Book Society.

== Bibliography ==
- "Episcopate, Race, and the Unity of the Church" in Episcopate: The Role of Bishops in a Shared Future (New York: Church Publishing, 2022) ISBN 9781640655539

== See also ==
- List of Episcopal bishops of the United States
- Historical list of the Episcopal bishops of the United States
