= Christ & Saint Stephen's Episcopal Church =

Church in Manhattan, New York

Coordinates: 40°46′32″N 73°58′53″W

Saint Stephen's Episcopal Church in 2024.

Saint Stephen's Episcopal Church in Manhattan, New York City, was founded in 1805 as the fifth Episcopal parish in the Episcopal Diocese of New York. The stone church, on the southeast corner of Broome and Chrystie Streets, was inaugurated on Saint Stephen's Day, December 26, 1805. By 1866 the congregation had largely moved uptown, and the rector the Rev. Joseph H. Price convinced the trustees to sell the old structure, which was demolished. In 1873 Saint Stephen's merged with the Church of the Advent on West 46th Street; in 1897 the parish purchased a simple brick chapel of the Church of the Transfiguration that had been built in 1880 on West 69th Street on the newly-developing Upper West Side. The first service of Saint Stephen’s Church was held there on October 3, 1897. The unpretentious church, set in a remnant of its suburban garden, is now the oldest church structure on the Upper West Side.

In 1975, the parish merged with Christ Church at Broadway and 71st Street as Christ and Saint Stephen’s Episcopal Church. Christ Church was subsequently demolished, but the organ, originally built in 1865 by Henry Erben (1801-1883) but much restored and rebuilt, was moved to Saint Stephen's.

In 2020, it reported 677 members, average attendance of 112, and $266,846 in plate and pledge income. In 2023, the church reported 100 members; the 2024 average Sunday attendance (ASA) was 64, with plate and pledge financial support of $259,497.
