= St. Andrew's Episcopal Church (Brewster, New York) =

Church building in Brewster, New York, U.S.

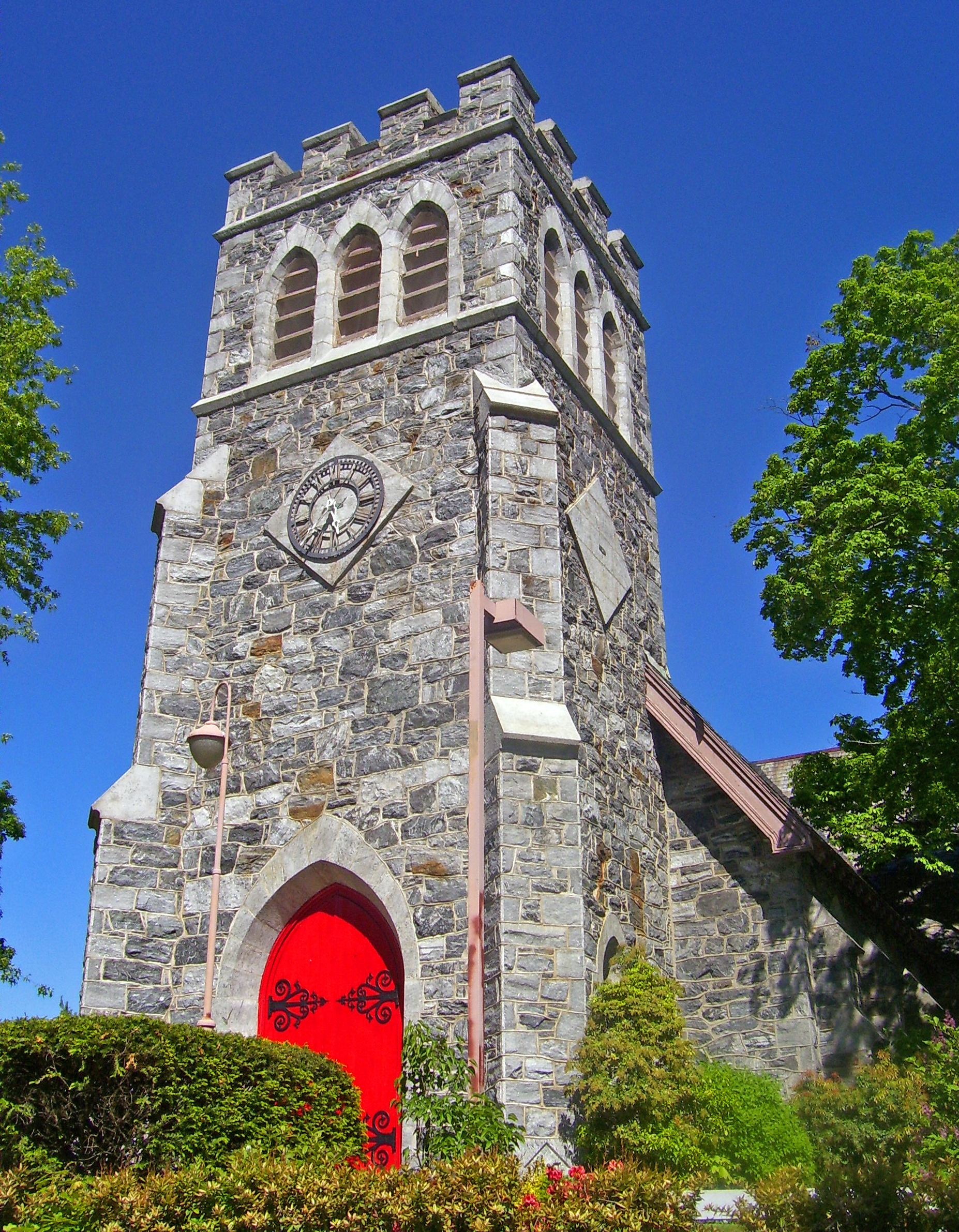
- Front elevation and tower, 2008

Religion
- Affiliation: ECUSA
- Year consecrated: 1903

Location
- Location: Brewster, NY, United States
- Interactive map of St. Andrew's Episcopal Church
- Coordinates: 41°23′51″N 73°37′00″W

Architecture
- Architects: Edward Pearce Casey, Arthur Durant Sneden
- Type: church
- Style: Late Victorian Gothic
- General contractor: A.W. Burritt Co.
- Groundbreaking: 1900
- Completed: 1903

Specifications
- Direction of façade: west
- Materials: granite, slate

U.S. National Register of Historic Places
- Added to NRHP: November 23, 1998
- NRHP Reference no.: 98001427

Website
- St. Andrew's Episcopal Church, Brewster, NY

St. Andrew's Episcopal Church is located at the corner of Prospect and Michael Neuner streets in Brewster, New York, United States. The congregation dates, informally, to 1872, though it was not formally accepted into the American Episcopal Church until ten years later. The building itself was finished in 1903, and was listed on the National Register of Historic Places in 1998.

It is the third church built on the site. Seth Howes, a wealthy congregant, offered to pay for the construction of a stone church to replace the first structure, a wooden church. He hired architects Edward Pearce Casey and Arthur Durant Sneden to design a church that recalled the English country churches that were among the first to use the Gothic Revival architectural style. However, this structure burned down within months of being finished and was immediately replaced. The current building features stained glass by Calvert & Kimberly, former students of Louis Comfort Tiffany. The chancel window, dedicated to Howes, is thought to be the work of Tiffany. The main part of the church has not been altered since its completion, although an addition was built in 1961.

== Building ==
The church occupies half its 20,000-square-foot (1,900 m^{2}) corner lot. It takes a cruciform shape, with granite-faced stone walls two feet (50 cm) thick. The tower and nave are supported by buttresses. The former is faced with an E. Howard & Co. clock over the heavy (up to 650 pounds (290 kg)), detailed red wooden double doors at the entrance; the latter has a cross-gabled roof surfaced in slate. The battlemented belfry shelters a 1,576-pound (715 kg) bell.

On the south transept is a wooden porch with a second entrance, similar to the first. The north transept leads to the Great Hall wing, built later of sympathetic design and materials.

Inside the nave is a hammerbeam roof, its exposed rafters built of varnished pine. On the floor are two rows of oak pews with three aisles. The south transept, once a vestibule itself, is set off with an oak screen and now has a chapel and columbarium. Opposite, to the north, are more pews, one of the organ's pipe banks. In the choir are the organ and its other pipe bank, the altar and two ornamental balconies. The stained glass windows along the walls tell the story of Christ, with the chancel window depicting Christ enthroned.

== Aesthetics ==
Seth Howes, the church's main benefactor at the time of the building's original construction, was particularly taken with the small country churches he had seen while traveling in England, and sought to have his church in a small country town in upstate New York emulate them. The hammerbeam roof is believed to have been something he asked for; in keeping with the style the two architects relied on simplicity and sweeping lines to create beauty, avoiding later Gothic Revival ornamentation such as gargoyles, flying buttresses or columns. It is, even today, one of the few stone churches in Putnam County.

== History ==
=== 19th century ===
In 1872 a group of Brewster townspeople began meeting in what was then the new town hall to hold Sunday school. These continued for eight years until that building burned down in 1880. A Brewster native and founder, Seth Howes, who had returned home to retire after becoming wealthy as a circus entrepreneur and Chicago-area developer, led the congregation in building a small wooden church on the current land. It was opened in 1881; the following year it was formally incorporated and admitted to the Episcopal Diocese of New York, marking the beginning of the church and its parish as a formal entity.

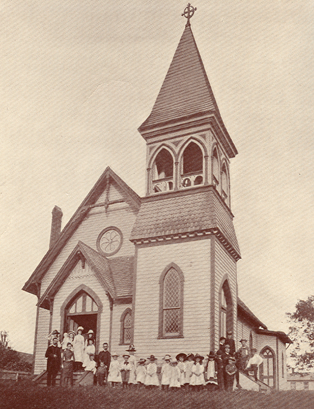
1881 wooden church building

In the next decade, the church established two chapels in nearby rural communities (they were eventually reunited with the church when the land on which one stood was acquired by New York City for one of its reservoirs in the area). Howes, who had been building and expanding his Morningthorpe estate south of Brewster, offered to pay for the building of a newer, more stylish church with surplus stone from that construction job.

He hired Edward Pearce Casey, best known at the time for his work on the Library of Congress's Thomas Jefferson Building (as it is now known), and Arthur Durant Sneden, then chief designer for the New York City Board of Education. Casey sketched out the main plan of the building and Sneden concentrated on the details. At the insistence of Howes, who had traveled abroad and was fond of English country churches, they hewed to that model.

=== 20th–21st centuries ===
The church was opened in time for Easter services in 1901, just two weeks before Howes died. Two and a half months later, the inside of the new church was gutted by fire and the building was largely destroyed. It was meticulously rebuilt to the original design and was formally consecrated in 1903.

Starting in the late 1920s, under the leadership of The Rev. F.A. Coleman, the church expanded its membership and started organizations like a Women's Auxiliary, The Girl's Friendly Society and the St. Andrew's Guild to serve the community. In 1961 the Great Hall, the only addition to the original church since its construction and rebuilding, was built to provide community meeting space and Sunday school programs.

The Rev. Lawrence Larson, who took over as rector in the 1980s, further expanded the church's outreach. In addition to the recently started nursery school, he spearheaded the creation of the Brewster Community Food Pantry in cooperation with two other area churches. Both are still in operation.

In 2000, the congregation called The Rev. Terri Heyduk to serve as its first permanent female rector, a position she held until 2009. She helped the church buy the neighboring house on Prospect Street, which was used as a consignment shop for some time.

The church held its last service around Easter 2019 when falling attendance and increasing costs due to the age of the building meant that it was impractical to continue so the church was forced to close.

== See also ==
- National Register of Historic Places listings in Putnam County, New York
