= Timothy Knapp House and Milton Cemetery =

Historic house in New York, United States

- U.S. National Register of Historic Places
- U.S. Historic district
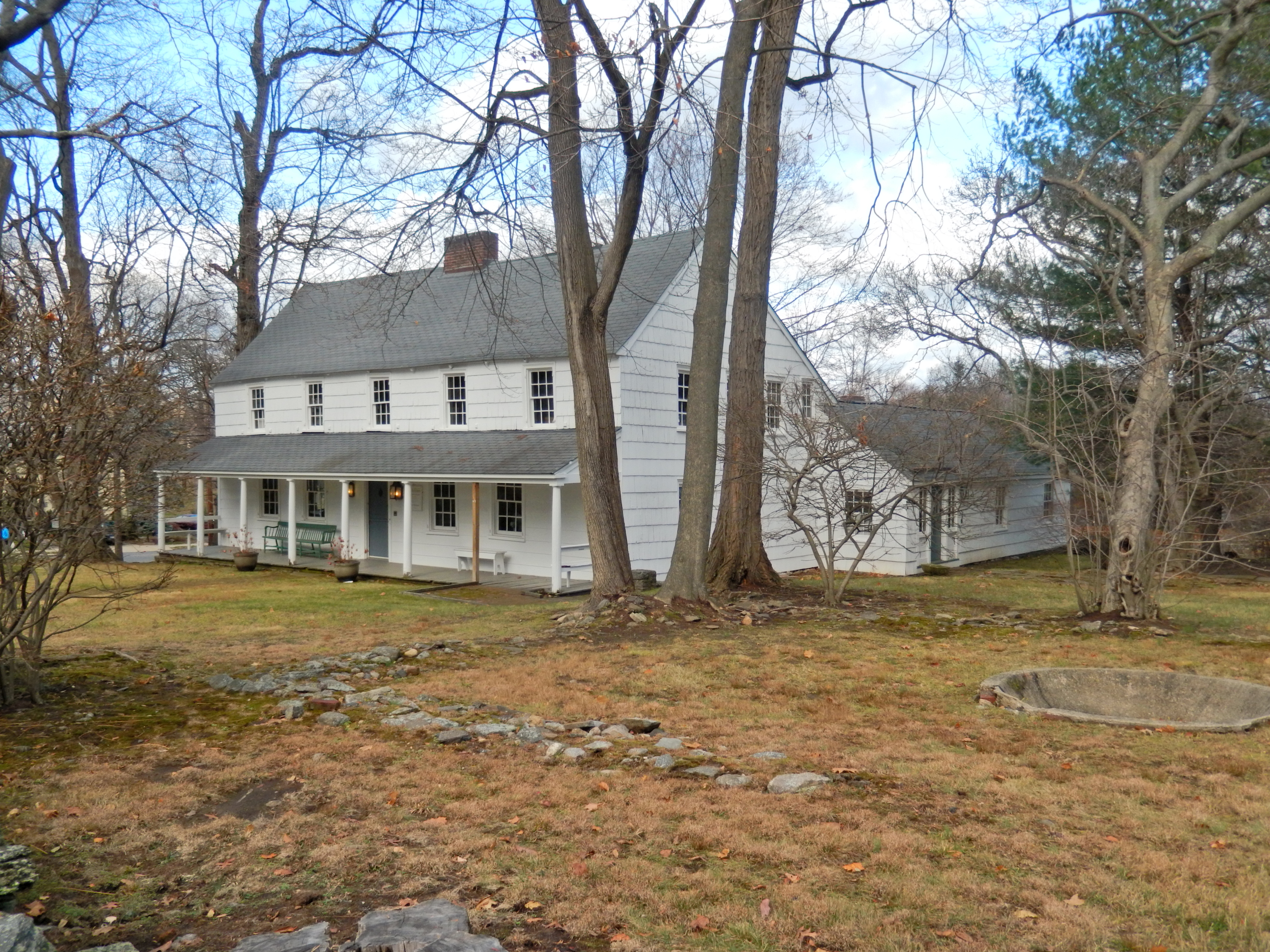
- Timothy Knapp House, Rye, New York

- Location within New York Location within the United States
- Interactive map showing the location of Timothy Knapp House and Milton Cemetery
- Location: 265 Rye Beach Ave. and Milton Rd., Rye, New York
- Coordinates: 40°57′53″N 73°41′12″W
- Built: 1670
- NRHP reference No.: 82003413
- Added to NRHP: June 14, 1982

Timothy Knapp House and Milton Cemetery is a historic district at 265 Rye Beach Avenue and Milton Road in Rye, New York. The earliest part of the Timothy Knapp House was built around 1670, and the site was added to the National Register of Historic Places in 1982.

The Timothy Knapp House is considered the oldest residential property in Westchester County, New York, having been built in the 1660s. The property has been owned by only five families between 1663 and 1992, when it was acquired by the Rye Historical Society. The Milton Cemetery, across the Street from the Knapp House, is Rye's first public burying ground. The house, surrounding gardens, and adjacent Milton Cemetery are listed on the National Register of Historic Places.

== History ==
Thomas Studwell, one of the original settlers of the village of Rye, New York, built a house along "the road to the beach" (now Rye Beach Ave.) in 1663. At the time, the town of Rye was part of the Connecticut Colony. He traded houses with Timothy Knapp of Stamford, Connecticut, who then built the foundations of the current structure as a two-room residence (all-purpose room on the first floor and a bedroom on the second floor) between 1667 and 1670. Knapp was the deputy to the General Court in Hartford, Connecticut, as well as a Town Constable and Tax Collector. He was also a vestryman of Grace Church in Rye.

Ezekiel Halsted, a wealthy landowner originally from Long Island, purchased the property from Timothy Knapp's sons in 1746. He expanded the house, adding a second floor using "post-and-beam" construction with a sloping roof in the back, which contained a dining room and kitchen, giving the house its distinctive saltbox look. Beams are hand-hewn, and some retain their original bark. The house has cellar walls reinforced with lime made from crushed oyster shells, 12-inch wooden nails holding floorboards together, and a massive center chimney reinforced with mud mortar. He also sided some of the walls with round-bottomed, "fish-scale" wood shingles, a decorative feature typical of early New England coastal settlements. The Halsted family lived in the house for the next 157 years.

In 1906, Simeon Ford, co-owner of the Grand Union Hotel in Manhattan and a real estate developer, purchased the Knapp House. His son, Ellsworth, grew vegetables and flowers on the farm for daily delivery to the hotel. Julia Lauren Ford, his daughter, was an internationally known religious artist whose work is included in the collections of the Metropolitan Museum, the Art Institute of Chicago, and the Corcoran Gallery in Washington. She was responsible for all 20th-century additions to the house, including a studio, a greenhouse, and an aviary. The additions, however, did not encroach upon the basic form of the house.

Before moving to Connecticut in 1940, Ms. Ford rented the house to the Matthew Taylors, whose descendants purchased it in 1969 and owned the property until it was sold to the Rye Historical Society in 1992 for $320,000.

== Milton Cemetery ==
The Milton Cemetery is a one-acre public burying ground; originally part of the Knapp estate, it is located on the west side of Milton Street across from the Knapp House. The oldest tombstone is that of Nehemiah Webb, who was buried in 1722; it was likely moved to the cemetery from a family burial ground. It is the first public, nonsectarian burying ground in Westchester County. (Up until the mid-19th century, the majority of burials took place in either parish churchyards or on private family lands.) The cemetery had been deeded to the then Town of Rye around 1750 by Joseph Lyon, one of Rye's early settlers, who is also buried there. The mid-19th-century opening of Greenwood Union Cemetery reduced use of the Milton Cemetery; all burials there were banned in the early 1900s.

== Archives and gardens ==
The Timothy Knapp House holds the Rye Historical Society Archives, including about 15,000 documents, maps, pictures, books, and pamphlets. The Kay Donahue Memorial Garden is a historic kitchen/herb garden with authentic plantings, maintained by the Little Garden Club.

== Preservation and landmark status ==
The House and Cemetery were placed on the National Register of Historic Places in 1982.

The Rye Historical Society purchased the Knapp House in 1992; it has been restored to accentuate its colonial character. The Milton Cemetery is now owned and maintained by the City of Rye.

== See also ==
- List of the oldest buildings in New York
- National Register of Historic Places listings in southern Westchester County, New York
- Saltbox house
