= Bible and Common Prayer Book Society =

Organization of the Episcopal Church

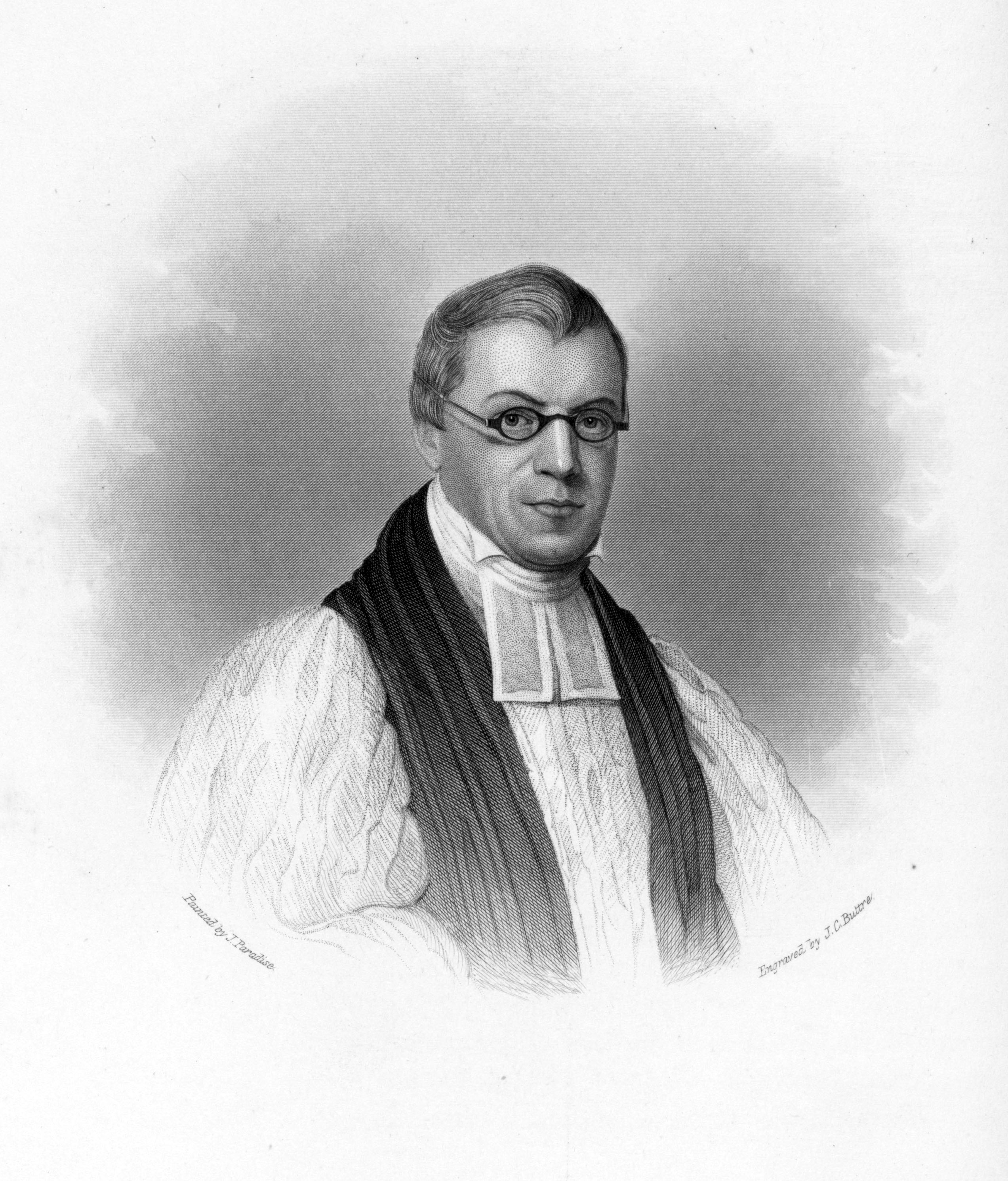
John Henry Hobart (1775–1830), founder

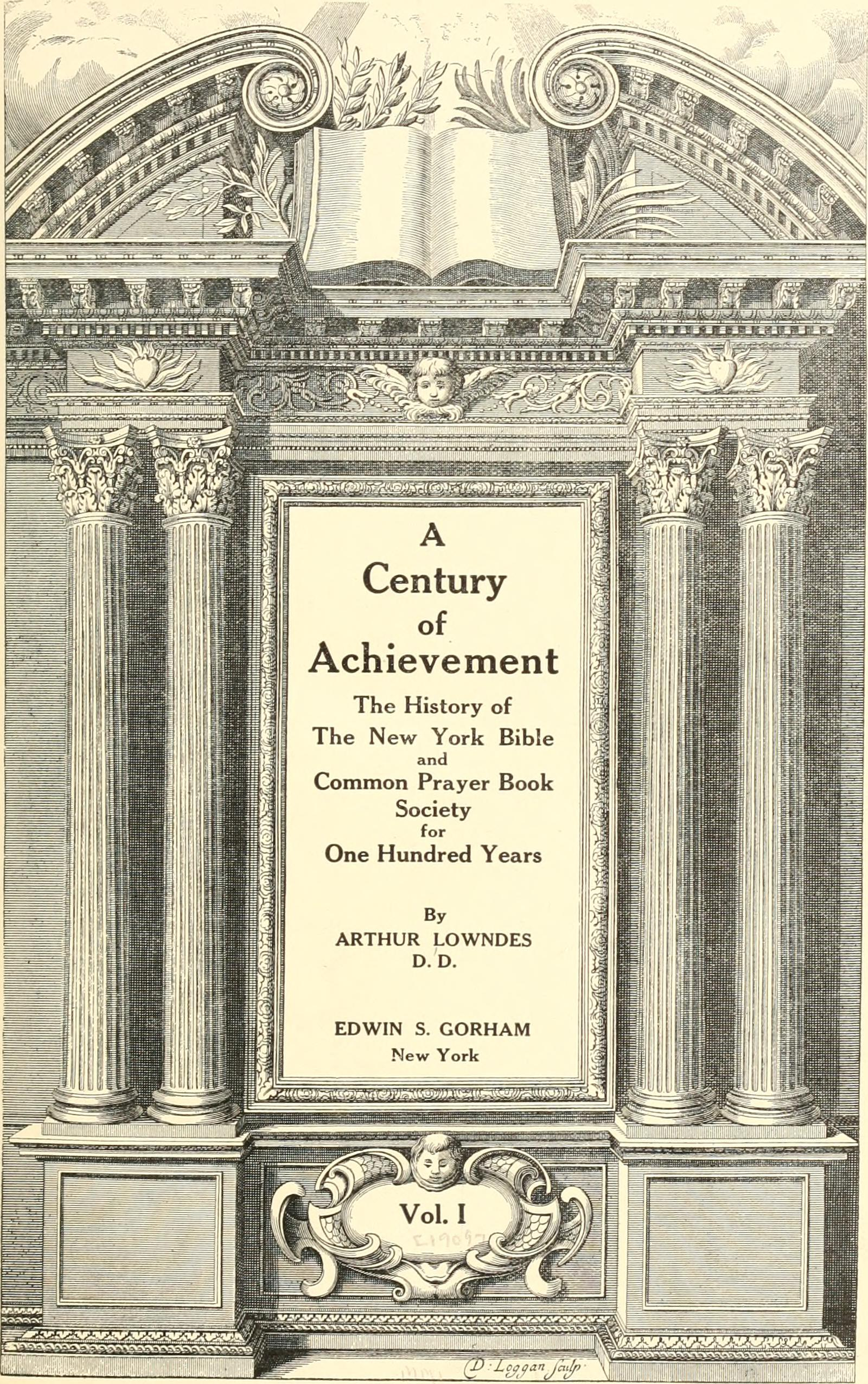
History of the New York Bible and Common Prayer Book Society (1909)

The Bible and Common Prayer Book Society of the Episcopal Church is a non-profit organization founded in 1809 by John Henry Hobart in the Episcopal Diocese of New York; it is independent of but affiliated with the Episcopal Church. It is a 501(c)(3) Public Charity with 2025 assets of $4,581,091. It claimed total revenue of $398,280 in 2025. Its office is in Red Bank, New Jersey. The society's work was discussed frequently in United States periodicals in the nineteenth and twentieth centuries.

It has published editions and translations of the Bible and the Book of Common Prayer. It currently makes grants to ministries of the Anglican Communion. In 2025, the organization provided a grant for hymnals in the Dakota language for use in the Episcopal Diocese of South Dakota. It has also collaborated with Church Publishing to provide liturgical materials online. In the 1980s, the society funded the French translation of the then-new 1979 Book of Common Prayer. Beginning in 2026, the society made grants to every incoming Episcopal Church seminarian of a bundle of liturgical, biblical, and musical resources approved by the General Convention.

Daniel Berkeley Updike's Merrymount Press printed the Bible and Common Prayer Book Society's Commemoration of the 250th anniversary of the Book of Common Prayer.

The Bible and Common Prayer Book Society is similar in history and activities to local organizations such as the Margaret Coffin Prayer Book Society in the Episcopal Diocese of Massachusetts (founded 1855) and the Bishop White Prayer Book Society in the Episcopal Diocese of Pennsylvania (founded 1834). It is a separate organization from the similarly named Prayer Book Society of the USA, founded to preserve the 1928 edition of the Book of Common Prayer and to promote study of its predecessors.

== Notable officers and managers ==
- Cornelius Roosevelt Duffie, first rector of St. Thomas Church, New York
- David H. Greer, Bishop of New York, 1908 to 1919
- John Henry Hobart
- William T. Manning, Rector of Trinity Church, New York (1908–1921), Bishop of New York (1921–1946)
- Richard Beamon Martin, Suffragan Bishop of Long Island
- Rodney R. Michel, Suffragan Bishop of Long Island (1997–2007), Assisting Bishop of Georgia (2007–2008) and Assisting Bishop of Pennsylvania (2009–2012)
- Benjamin Moore, second Episcopal bishop of New York and fifth President of Columbia University
- Richard Channing Moore, second Bishop of Virginia
- Samuel Provoost, first chaplain of the United States Senate, first bishop of the Episcopal Diocese of New York

== Board ==
- Mr. Stephen Storen, President
- The Rev. Jacob A. Smith, Vice President; Rector of Calvary-St. George's Parish
- Neva Rae Fox, Secretary
- Anne Bardol, Treasurer
- Thomas K. Chu, Esq.
- John E. Colón, Baruch College
- The Rev. Deacon Paul S. Kahn, St. Ignatius of Antioch Church (New York City)
- Richard J. Mammana, FRAS
- The Rev. Dr. Ruth A. Meyers, chair of the Standing Commission on Liturgy and Music (2009–2015)
- The Right Rev. Allen K. Shin; Suffragan Bishop of New York
- Bro. James E. Teets, BSG

== Notable editions ==
- 1789 U. S. Book of Common Prayer
- The 1871 Standard
- (German) Bischofs-Agende der Protestantisch-Bischöflichen Kirche in den Vereinigten Staaten von Amerika: Enthaltend den Ritus für die Weihe von Bischöfen, Priestern und Diakonen, mit Litanei und Communion; die Form der Kirch-Weihung, das Amt der Installation und die heilige Confirmations-Handlung; nebst den Religions-Artikeln (1880)
- Service Book in the Dialect of the Qlīyukuwhūtana Indians (1908)
- (Ojibwe) Iu wejibue̲wisi̲ mamawi anamiawini mazinaigun: tibishko eji abajito̲ ima shaganoshshi anamiawini̲ gaye tigosi̲ pu̲gi wawenabujiganun iniu nugamowinun au David (1911)
- (Swedish) Den Allmänna Bönboken [...] jämte Psaltaren eller Davids Psalmer (1913)
