= Christ's Church, Rye =

Christ’s Church, Rye
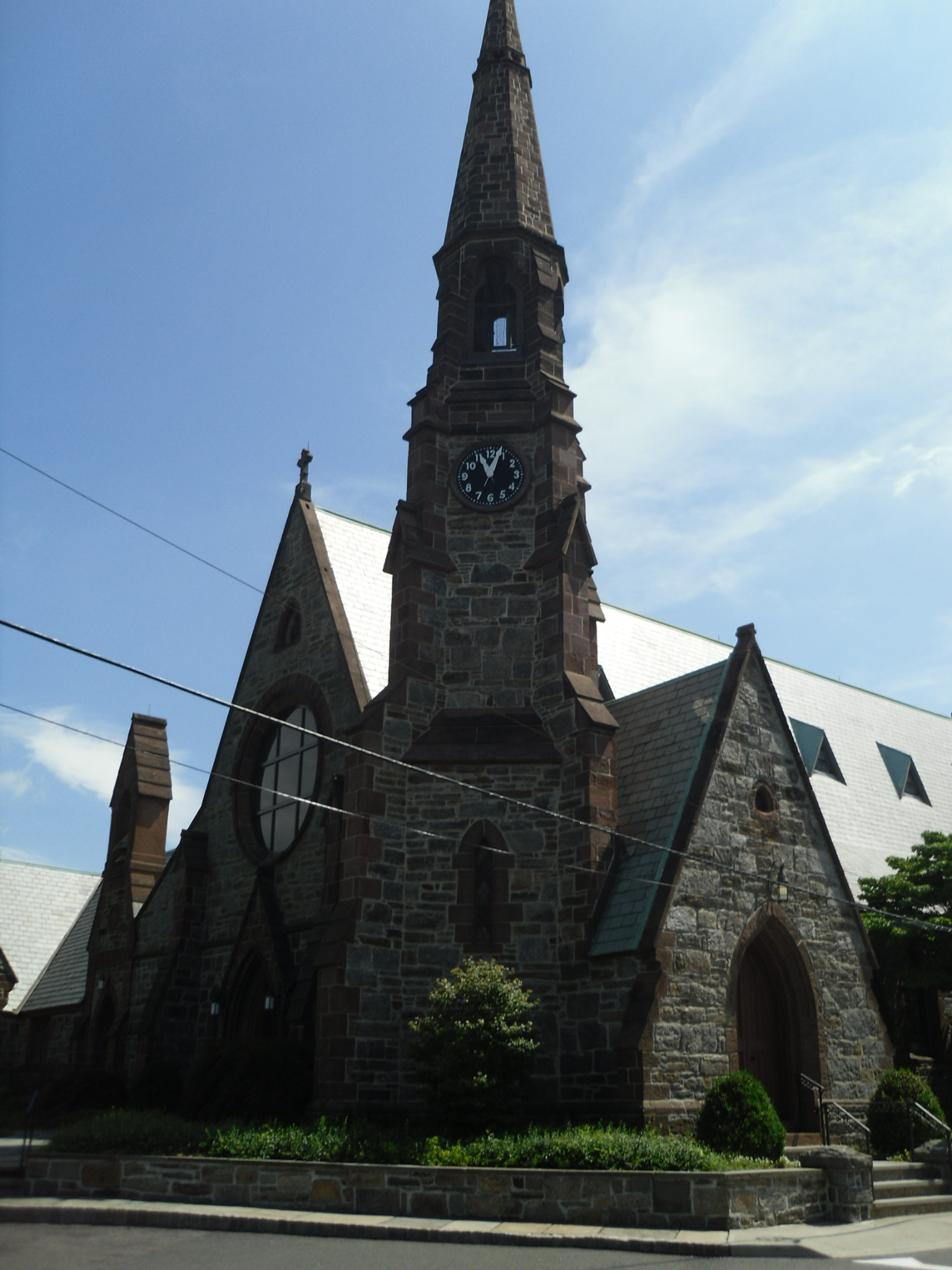
- Christ’s Church, Rye
- Christ’s Church, Rye
- 40°58′45″N 73°41′1″W
- Location: 2 Rectory Street, Rye, New York
- Country: United States of America
- Denomination: Episcopal Church (United States)
- Website: ccrye.org

History
- Founded: 1695
- Consecrated: 19 June 1869

Architecture
- Architect: Florentine Pelletier
- Style: Gothic Revival
- Years built: 1868−1869

Administration
- Diocese: Diocese of New York

Clergy
- Rector: The Rev. Matt Stone

Christ's Church, Rye (formerly Grace Church), is an Episcopal church in the Diocese of New York, located next to the Boston Post Road (U.S. Route 1) in Rye in Westchester County, New York. Established in 1695, the parish is one of the oldest in the United States of America. Construction of the first church began in 1706; the present building, dating from the 1860s, is the fourth to be erected on the site.

== History of the parish ==
In the late 1600s Rye, then part of the Colony of Connecticut, was served by Congregational and Presbyterian ministers elected by taxpaying households. In 1682 Rye was ceded to the royal Province of New York, raising the possibility of forming an Anglican church in the town. The Governor of New York, Benjamin Fletcher, seeking to make the Church of England the established church in the province, passed the Act for Settling a Ministry in 1693, which enabled justices of the peace to organize a meeting of landowners for the purpose of choosing churchwardens and vestrymen whose task it would be to appoint a minister.

A meeting was convened in Rye on 28 February 1695 by Captain Joseph Theall at which two churchwardens and eight vestrymen were elected. After a period of political turmoil during which Rye briefly rejoined Connecticut, Colonel Caleb Heathcote, a local landowner who had previously helped to establish Trinity Church in Manhattan and other parishes in the area, turned his attention to Rye. In 1704 the Society for the Propagation of the Gospel in Foreign Parts sent the Rev. Thomas Pritchard to be the first Church of England clergyman to serve as rector of the area covering Rye, Mamaroneck and Bedford.

Pritchard died the following year and was succeeded by the Rev. George Muirson, a Scotsman, who helped the town to raise taxes for the construction of a church building. Until then services had been held in various private residences, including the home of Timothy Knapp. Begun in 1706 on the site occupied by all subsequent churches, the church was made of stone and wood from parishioners’ properties. Known as Grace Church, it was a modest structure – 50 ft long, with no steeple or pews. Queen Anne provided gifts for the congregation, including a Bible, a Book of Common Prayer and silver communion ware.

The church's growth during the eighteenth century was interrupted by the unrest brought about by the American Revolutionary War, which tested the loyalties of Anglican clergymen. On 5 November 1776 the body of the rector, the Rev. Ephraim Avery, was found dead, his throat having been cut, and three years later the church burned down. For several years parishioners gathered for worship in each other's homes, and no vestry meetings were held between 1776 and 1785. In 1788 work began on a new church, built of wood in the Federal style. Peter Jay, father of the first Chief Justice of the United States, John Jay, served as the first senior warden after the revolution and in 1794 presented the church with a new seal that he had designed. In 1796 the church's name was changed from “Grace Church” to “Christ’s Church at the Town of Rye in the County of Westchester and State of New York”, later shortened to “Christ's Church, Rye”.

In 1837 three acres of land were donated to Christ's Church for the establishment of a cemetery. Known as the Union Cemetery of Rye, it contained an area to be used as a public burial ground as well as plots set aside for the ministers of Rye churches and their families.

As the population of Rye grew during the nineteenth century, especially after the arrival of the railroad, it was decided to replace the 1788 edifice with a new church, built of stone in the Gothic Revival style. Designed by the firm of Frank Wills and Henry C. Dudley, it was erected in 1854–1855 at a cost of approximately $18,000 and consecrated on 15 March 1859 by the Rt. Rev. Jonathan Wainwright, Bishop of New York.

The third church was destroyed after a fire broke out on the evening of 21 December 1866. The fourth – and present – church was designed in a similar Gothic Revival style by Florentine Pelletier and consecrated on 19 June 1869 by the Rt. Rev. Horatio Potter, Bishop of New York.

In the late nineteenth century, a mission chapel known as Grace Chapel served as an outpost for Christ's Church parishioners living on Milton Point in Rye. Renamed Rye Meeting House, it later served as a Quaker meeting house and was added to the National Register of Historic Places in 2011. In the 1800s Christ's Church also founded a chapel (later St. Peter's Church) in neighboring Port Chester.

== Buildings and architecture ==
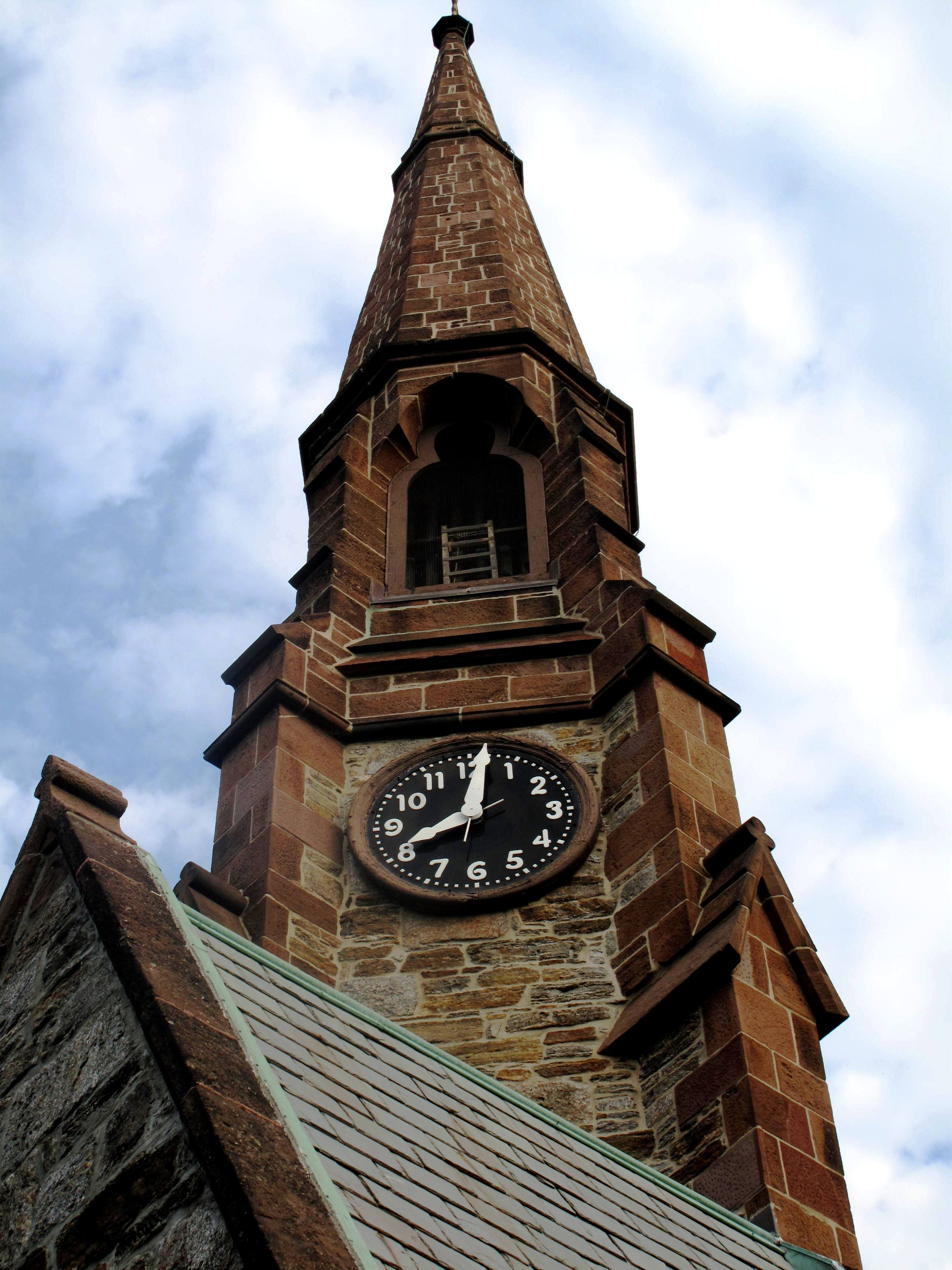
The clock tower of Christ's Church.

Christ's Church consists of a number of buildings, including the church, parish hall, rectory and nursery school.

The church was constructed with granite and brownstone, with a rose window and 100 ft clock tower at the west end. The stained glass window in the chancel was designed by Louis Comfort Tiffany in the 1890s, around the same time that a new altar, reredos and organ were acquired. The organ was replaced by Clarence Watters in the 1920s with a Wangerin instrument, on which Marcel Dupré played the dedicatory recital, and again in the 1960s with an instrument made by Austin Organs of Hartford, Connecticut.

Adjoining the church are the parish hall, built in the 1920s, and the Chapel of Thanksgiving, which was added in 1952. The nursery school wing, designed by the firm of Rogers & Butler, was added in 1957–1958 and contains classrooms for Christ's Church Nursery School and offices for clergy and staff. The rectory was built in 1878 by the New York architects McKim, Mead & Bigelow (later McKim, Mead & White).

== The church today ==
Christ's Church offers weekly services, which are also livestreamed, with music provided by both children's and adult choirs, and its outreach programs serve communities in Rye, Port Chester and elsewhere.

Since 1942 Christ's Church has held a joint commemorative service with St Mary's Church in Rye, England.

== Rectors ==
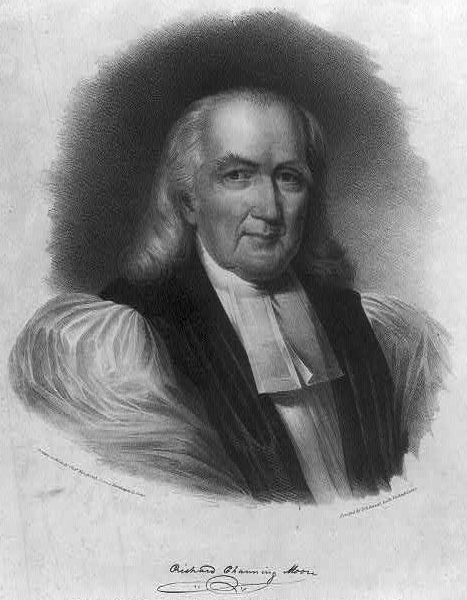
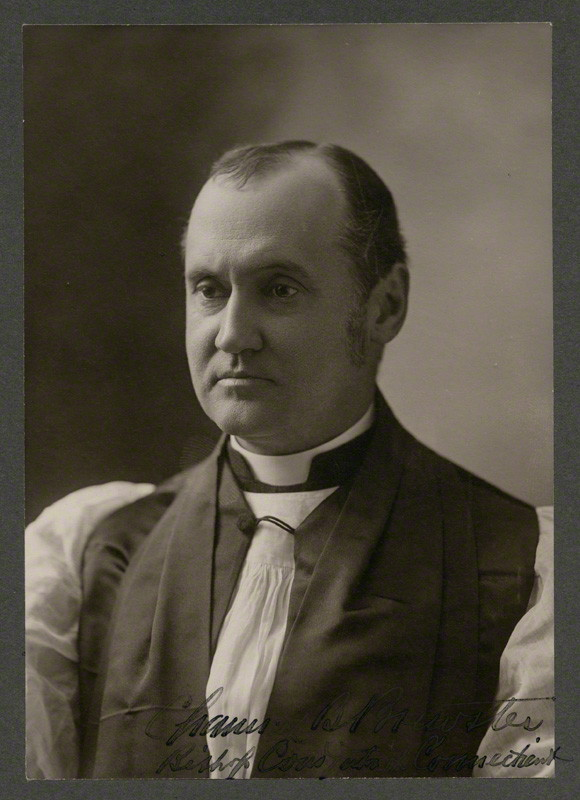
Two former rectors were subsequently elevated to the episcopacy. The Rt. Rev. Richard Channing Moore, left, was Bishop of Virginia from 1814 to 1841, and the Rt. Rev. Chauncey Bunce Brewster, right, was Bishop of Connecticut from 1899 to 1928.

The following have served as Rector of Christ's Church:

- 1704–1705: Rev. Thomas Pritchard
- 1705–1708: Rev. George Muirson
- 1710–1719: Rev. Christopher Bridge
- 1722–1726: Rev. Robert Jenney
- 1726–1760: Rev. James Wetmore
- 1763–1764: Rev. Ebenezer Punderson
- 1765–1776: Rev. Ephraim Avery
- 1787–1788: Rev. Richard Channing Moore
- 1790–1793: Rev. David Foote
- 1793–1796: Rev. John Jackson Sands
- 1796–1797: Rev. George Ogilvie
- 1797–1801: Rev. Samuel Haskell (first term)
- 1802–1809: Rev. Evan Rogers
- 1809–1823: Rev. Samuel Haskell (second term)
- 1823–1830: Rev. William Thompson
- 1830–1831: Rev. John Murray Forbes
- 1832–1834: Rev. William M. Carmichael
- 1834–1848: Rev. Peter C. Chauncey
- 1849–1859: Rev. Edward Coleman Bull
- 1859–1864: Rev. John Campbell White
- 1864–1873: Rev. Reese Fell Alsop
- 1873–1882: Rev. Chauncey Bunce Brewster
- 1882–1886: Rev. Walter Mitchell
- 1887–1904: Rev. William West Kirkby
- 1905–1909: Rev. Thomas Worrall
- 1910–1938: Rev. Richard Townsend Henshaw
- 1939–1977: Rev. Wendell Phillips
- 1977–1978: Rev. Robert Merrill Dresser
- 1979–1996: Rev. Edward Johnston
- 2000–2016: Rev. Susan Carol Harriss
- 2018–2024: Rev. Katherine Malin
- 2025-Present: The Rev. Matt Stone

The Rev. Fleming Rutledge, one of the first women to be ordained to the priesthood in the Episcopal Church of America, served as curate at Christ's Church in the 1970s.
