= St. James Church and Rectory (Callicoon, New York) =

Historic church in New York, United States

- U.S. National Register of Historic Places
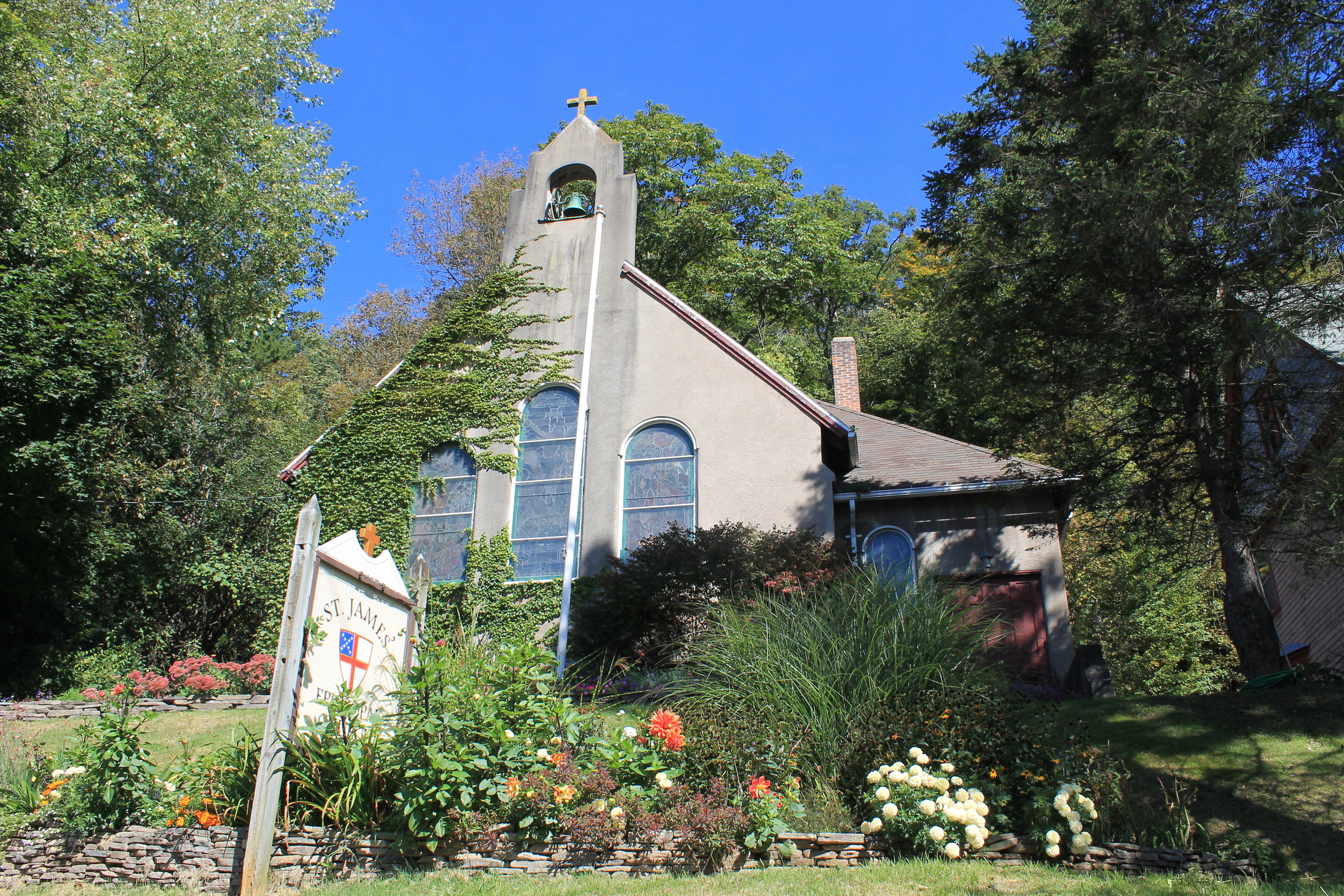

- Location within New York Location within the United States
- Location: NY 17B N side, E of jct. with NY 97, Town of Delaware, Callicoon, New York
- Coordinates: 41°45′54″N 75°3′11″W
- Area: 1 acre (0.40 ha)
- Built: 1912 (Rectory); 1928 (Church)
- Architect: Herman, Martin
- Architectural style: Queen Anne, Mission/Spanish Revival
- MPS: Upper Delaware Valley, New York and Pennsylvania, MPS
- NRHP reference No.: 93001135
- Added to NRHP: November 04, 1993

St. James Church and Rectory is a historic Episcopal church on NY 17B on the north side, east of the junction with NY 97, within the Town of Delaware in Callicoon, Sullivan County, New York. The church was built in 1928 and the rectory about 1912. The church is a gabled building with a stuccoed exterior in the Mission style. It features a bell tower centered at the peak of the front-facing gable. The rectory is a simplified Queen Anne style residence. It was added to the National Register of Historic Places in 1993.

The church reported 18 members in 2015 and three members in 2023; no membership statistics were reported in 2024 parochial reports. Plate and pledge income for the congregation in 2024 was $7,416 with average Sunday attendance (ASA) of six persons.
