= St. Peter's Episcopal Church (Port Chester, New York) =

Historic church in New York, United States

- U.S. National Register of Historic Places
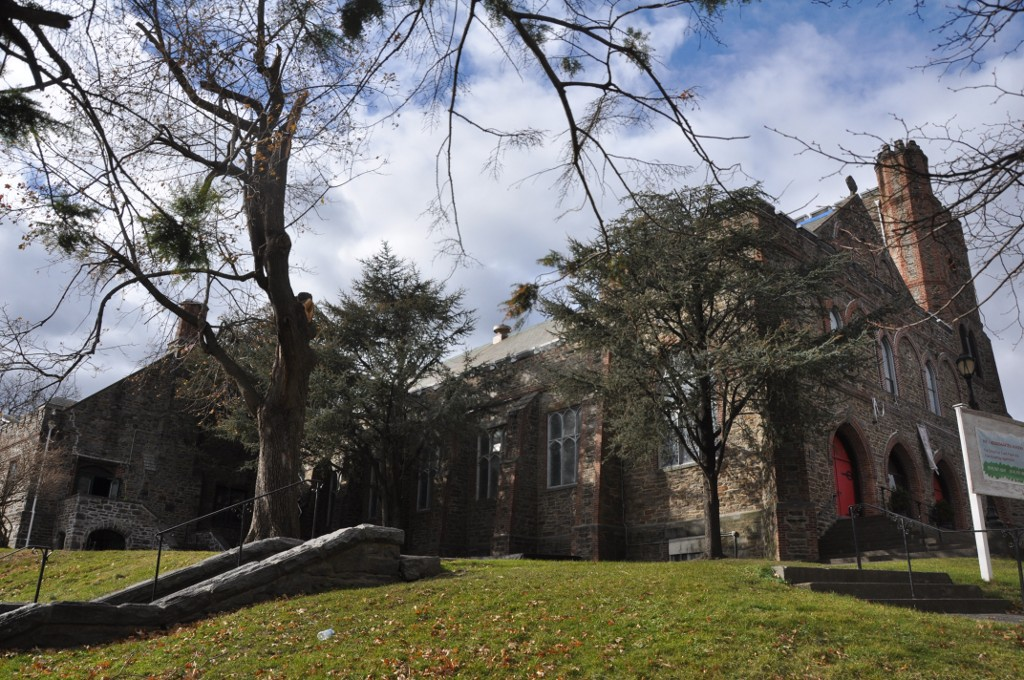
- St. Peter's Episcopal Church, November 2012

- Location within New York Location within the United States
- Location: 19 Smith St., Port Chester, New York
- Coordinates: 41°0′14″N 73°40′1″W
- Area: less than one acre
- Built: 1889
- Architect: Brown, A. Page
- Architectural style: Late Gothic Revival
- NRHP reference No.: 06000260
- Added to NRHP: 12 April 2006

St. Peter's Episcopal Church is a historic Episcopal church located at 19 Smith Street in Port Chester, Westchester County, New York.

== History ==
St. Peter's was formed as a mission of Christ's Church in neighboring Rye in the 1830s, and the first services were performed by the Rev. Peter Chauncey, rector of Christ's Church, in 1836. The original chapel building was replaced in 1853, when St. Peter's became a stand-alone parish. Located on North Main Street next to the railroad, the building was destroyed by fire in 1883 and a new site was sought for the church.

In 1887 the parish acquired land on the corner of Smith Street and Westchester Avenue and a new church was constructed in 1889−1890 to designs by A. Page Brown, who had previously worked for the firm McKim, Mead & White. The cornerstone was laid by the Rt. Rev. Henry Codman Potter, Bishop of New York, on 23 April 1889 and the church opened for worship the following year.

== Architecture ==
The church has a bluestone, gray limestone and brick exterior with a slate roof, in a late Gothic Revival style. It features a large square clock tower, which also serves as a porte cochere, ten Tiffany grisaille windows and other Tiffany furniture including an altar rail and brass pulpit. A bronze honor roll was erected after the First World War containing the names of church members who had served during the conflict.

The parish hall was built in the 1920s with a castellated parapet and gable roof and includes a large auditorium with a raised stage.

== Current status ==
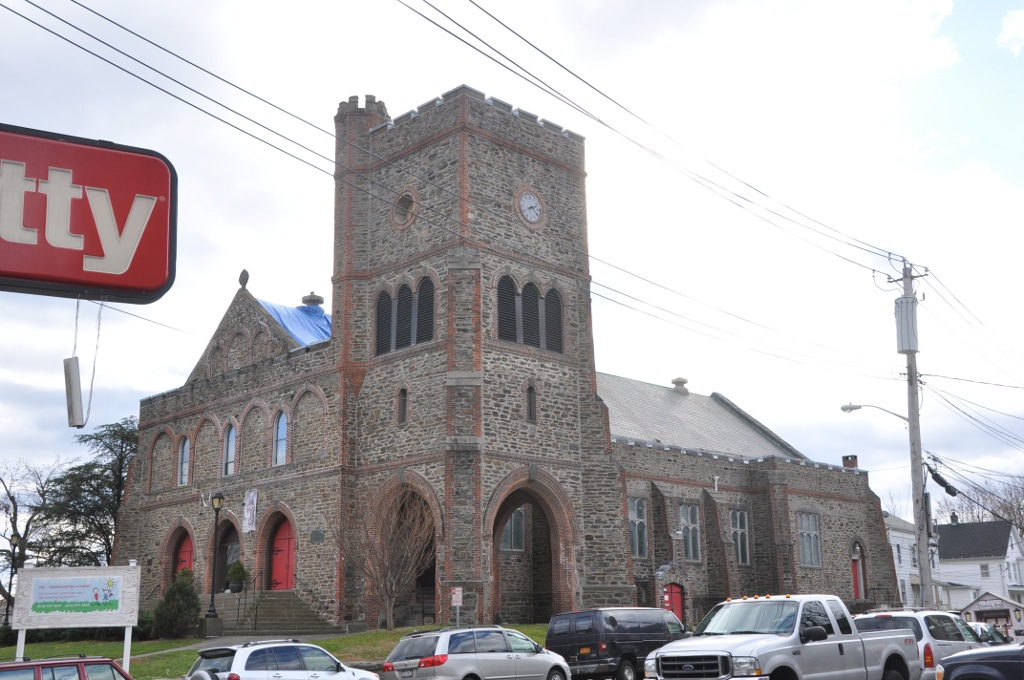
St. Peter's Episcopal Church, November 2012.

St. Peter's Church was added to the National Register of Historic Places in 2006.

As of 2022, it is no longer an active Episcopal church holding regular services, but continues to offer social programs for the community.

== See also ==
- National Register of Historic Places listings in southern Westchester County, New York
