= Catherine S. Roskam =

American prelate (born 1943)

The Right Reverend Catherine Scimeca Roskam M.Div.
- Suffragan Bishop of New York
- Church: Episcopal Church
- Diocese: New York
- Elected: June 10, 1995
- In office: 1996–2012
- Successor: Allen K. Shin

Orders
- Ordination: December 20, 1984 by Paul Moore Jr.
- Consecration: January 27, 1996 by Edmond L. Browning

Personal details
- Born: Catherine Anna Scimeca; March 30, 1943 (age 83) Hempstead, New York, United States
- Denomination: Anglican (prev. Roman Catholic)
- Spouse: Philip K. Roskam (m. 1966)
- Children: 1

Catherine Anna Scimeca Roskam (born March 30, 1943) is an American prelate, who served as Suffragan Bishop of New York from 1996 till 2012.

== Early life and career ==
Catherine Scimeca was born on March 30, 1943, in Hempstead, New York and was raised as a Roman Catholic. She studied at Middlebury College in Vermont, and later commenced her career as theater actress, playing a variety of roles, mainly Shakespearean. She also worked as a municipal case worker. In 1966, she married Philip Roskam, who was also a case worker.

She joined the Episcopal Church in 1974. She attended the General Theological Seminary and graduated in 1984. She was then ordained to the diaconate on June 9, 1984 and to the priesthood on December 20, 1984. Catherine worked closely with AIDS victims in New York City, before moving to San Francisco in 1989. While there, she became rector of Our Saviour in Mill Valley, California and in 1991 became priest-in-charge of Holy Innocents Church in San Francisco. Nine months later she became diocesan missioner for 24 congregations.

== Bishop ==
On June 10, 1995, Roskam was elected on the third ballot as the Suffragan Bishop of New York. She was then consecrated on January 27, 1996 by Presiding Bishop Edmond L. Browning, in the Cathedral of St. John the Divine. Barbara Harris, Suffragan Bishop of Massachusetts, and Richard F. Grein, Bishop of New York, were co-consecrators. Roskam retired in 2012. In retirement, she served as bishop in resident at St. James Episcopal Church in Los Angeles.
