= Richard Beamon Martin =

The Right Reverend Richard Beamon Martin D.D.
- Suffragan Bishop of Long Island
- Church: Episcopal Church
- Diocese: Long Island
- Elected: 1966
- In office: 1967–1974

Orders
- Ordination: February 1943 by Albert Sidney Thomas
- Consecration: February 2, 1967 by John E. Hines

Personal details
- Born: February 23, 1913 Peak, South Carolina, United States
- Died: April 11, 2012 (aged 99) Brooklyn, New York, United States
- Denomination: Anglican
- Parents: Benjamin Butler Martin & Viola Glasgow
- Spouse: Annelle Hoover
- Children: 2
- Education: Allen University

Richard Beamon Martin (February 23, 1913 – April 11, 2012) was a bishop in The Episcopal Church.

== Early life and education ==
Martin was born on February 23, 1913, in Peak, South Carolina, the son of Benjamin Butler Martin and Viola Glasgow. He was educated at the Georgetown High School and later graduated with a Bachelor of Arts in 1937 from Allen University. Later he thought languages and social studies at Georgetown High School. He then studied at Bishop Payne Divinity School, which merged with Virginia Theological Seminary in 1949. Martin graduated in 1942 with a Bachelor of Divinity. In 1955 he graduated with a Doctor of Divinity from Allen University.

== Ordained ministry ==
After graduation, Martin was ordained deacon on June 8, 1942, and priest in February 1943. His first assignment was as priest-in-charge of the Church of the Good Shepherd in Sumter, South Carolina, and St Augustine's Church in Wedgefield, South Carolina. In the meantime, he also was an educator of philosophy and English at Morris College. In 1944 he became rector of Grace Church in Norfolk, Virginia, and was also Archdeacon of Southern Virginia. Between 1963 and 1967 he served as rector of St Philip's Church in Brooklyn, New York, and between 1965 and 1967 he was also the Archdeacon of Brooklyn.

== Bishop ==
He was elected Suffragan Bishop of Long Island in 1966 and was consecrated on February 2, 1967, by Presiding Bishop John E. Hines in the Cathedral of the Incarnation in Garden City, New York. During his time as bishop, he was known for his reconciling spirit and as an advocate for recruitment, training and deployment of Black people seeking Holy Orders. His autobiography was published in 2006, when he was 93. He was a president of the Bible and Common Prayer Book Society.
