= Grace Episcopal Church (Middletown, New York) =

Historic church in New York, United States

- U.S. National Register of Historic Places
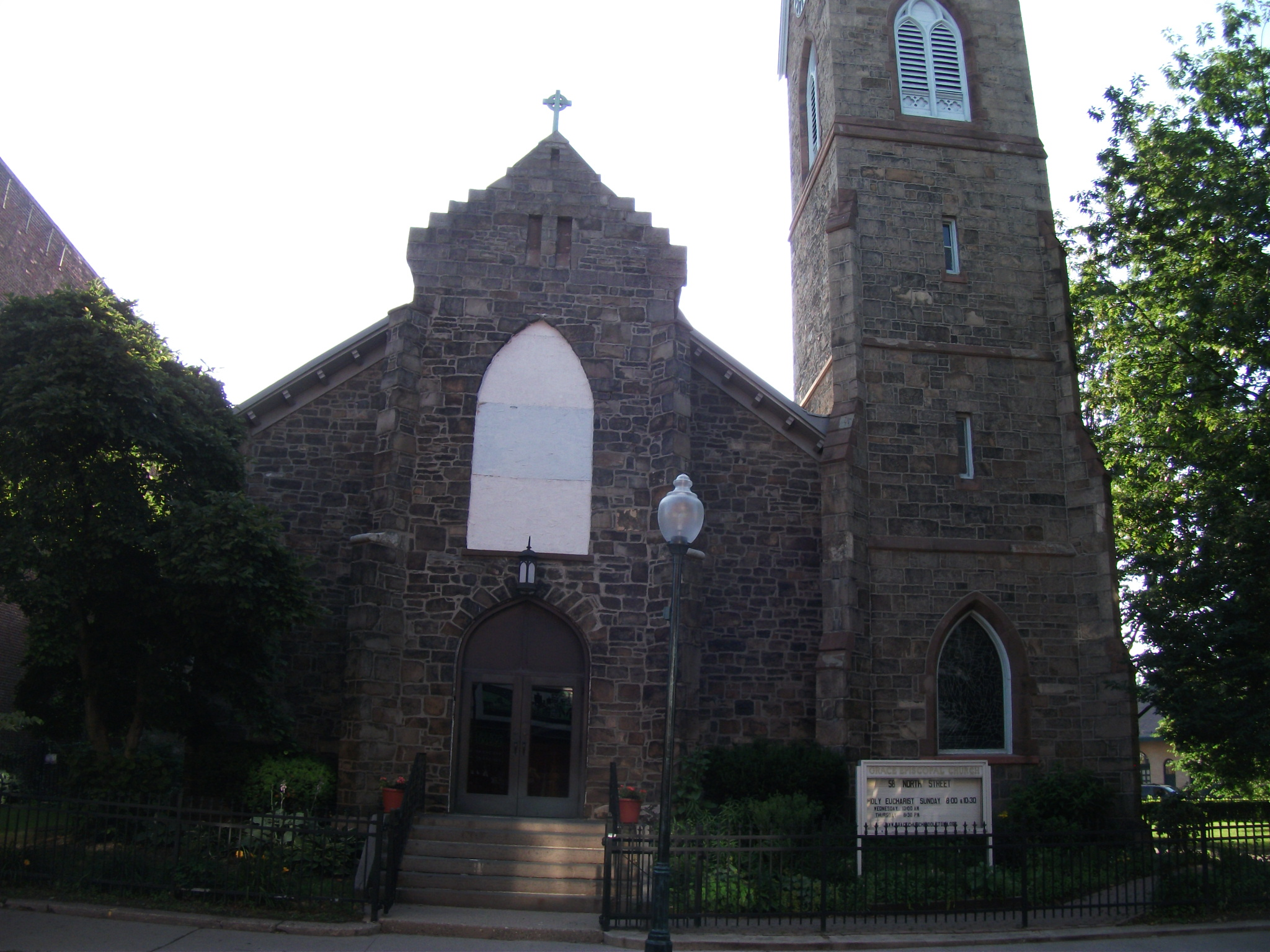
- Grace Episcopal Church, June 2011

- Location within New York Location within the United States
- Location: 58 North Street, Middletown, New York
- Coordinates: 41°26′48″N 74°25′10″W
- Area: Less than 1 acre (0.40 ha)
- Built: 1846-1847, 1866-1868, 1915
- Architectural style: Gothic Revival
- NRHP reference No.: 10000945
- Added to NRHP: November 29, 2010

Grace Episcopal Church is a historic Episcopal church located at Middletown in Orange County, New York. The original church was built between 1846 and 1847, then enlarged and aggrandized in the Gothic Revival style between 1866 and 1868. A Collegiate Gothic style parish house was added in 1913. The church features an off-set bell tower with stepped buttresses and Gothic arched windows.

It was listed on the National Register of Historic Places in 2010.
