= St. John's Episcopal Church and Rectory (Monticello, New York) =

Historic church in New York, United States

- U.S. National Register of Historic Places
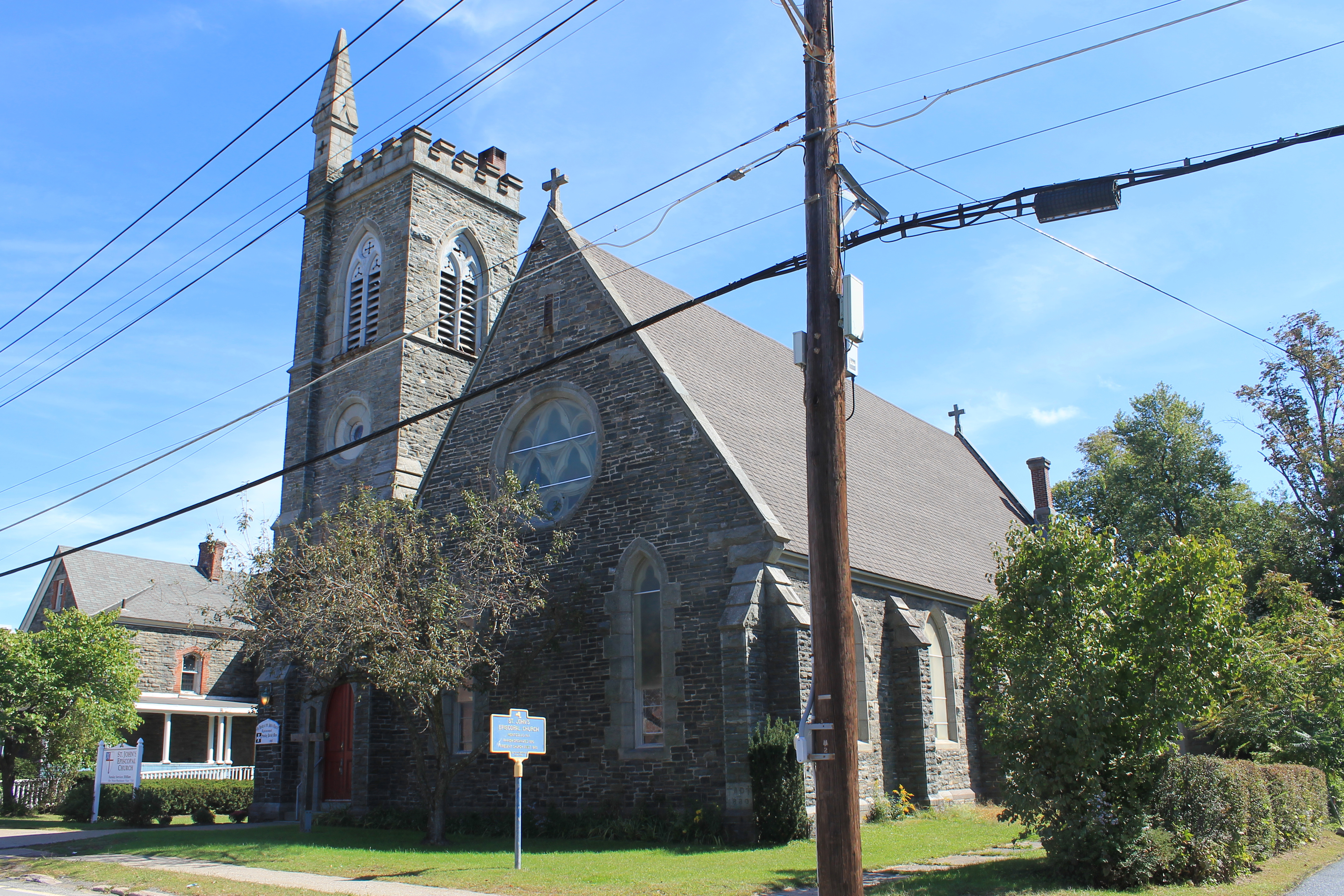

- Location within New York Location within the United States
- Location: 15 St. John's St., Monticello, New York
- Coordinates: 41°39′12″N 74°41′12″W
- Area: less than one acre
- Built: 1881
- Architect: Dudley, Henry; Ketchum, Robert
- Architectural style: Gothic Revival
- NRHP reference No.: 02001359
- Added to NRHP: November 21, 2002

St. John's Episcopal Church and Rectory is a historic Episcopal church and rectory complex at 15 St. John's Street in Monticello, Sullivan County, New York. It was built between 1879 and 1881 and is "L" shaped in plan, consisting of the church and an attached chapel. Built of quarry-faced, randomly laid coursed stone, the church features a tall, engaged corner three-stage entrance tower with a crenellated top.

It was added to the National Register of Historic Places in 2002.
