= Saint Mark's Episcopal Church (Chelsea, New York) =

Historic church in New York, United States

- U.S. National Register of Historic Places
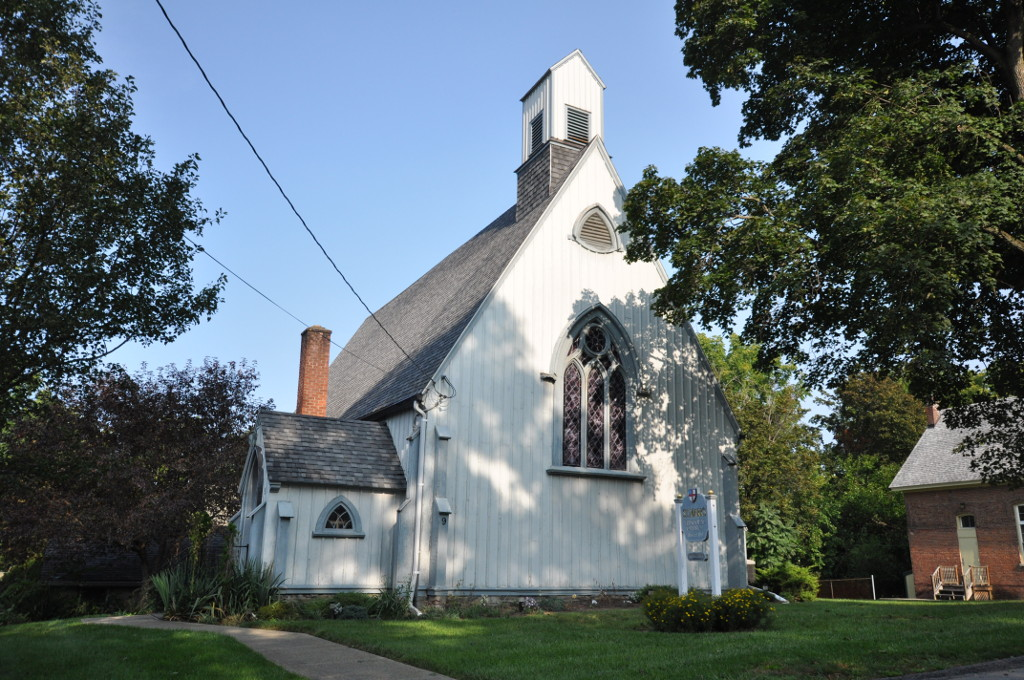

- Location within New York Location within the United States
- Location: Liberty St., Chelsea, New York
- Coordinates: 41°33′7″N 73°58′5″W
- Area: less than one acre
- Built: 1866
- Architectural style: Gothic Revival
- MPS: Chelsea MRA
- NRHP reference No.: 87001369
- Added to NRHP: August 25, 1987

Saint Mark's Episcopal Church is a historic Episcopal church on Liberty Street in Chelsea, Dutchess County, New York. It was built in 1866 and is a small rectangular frame church building in the Gothic Revival style. It has a steeply pitched gable roof, topped by a belfry. It features a three-part lancet window.

It was added to the National Register of Historic Places in 1987.
