= Thayer Hotel =

The Thayer Hotel
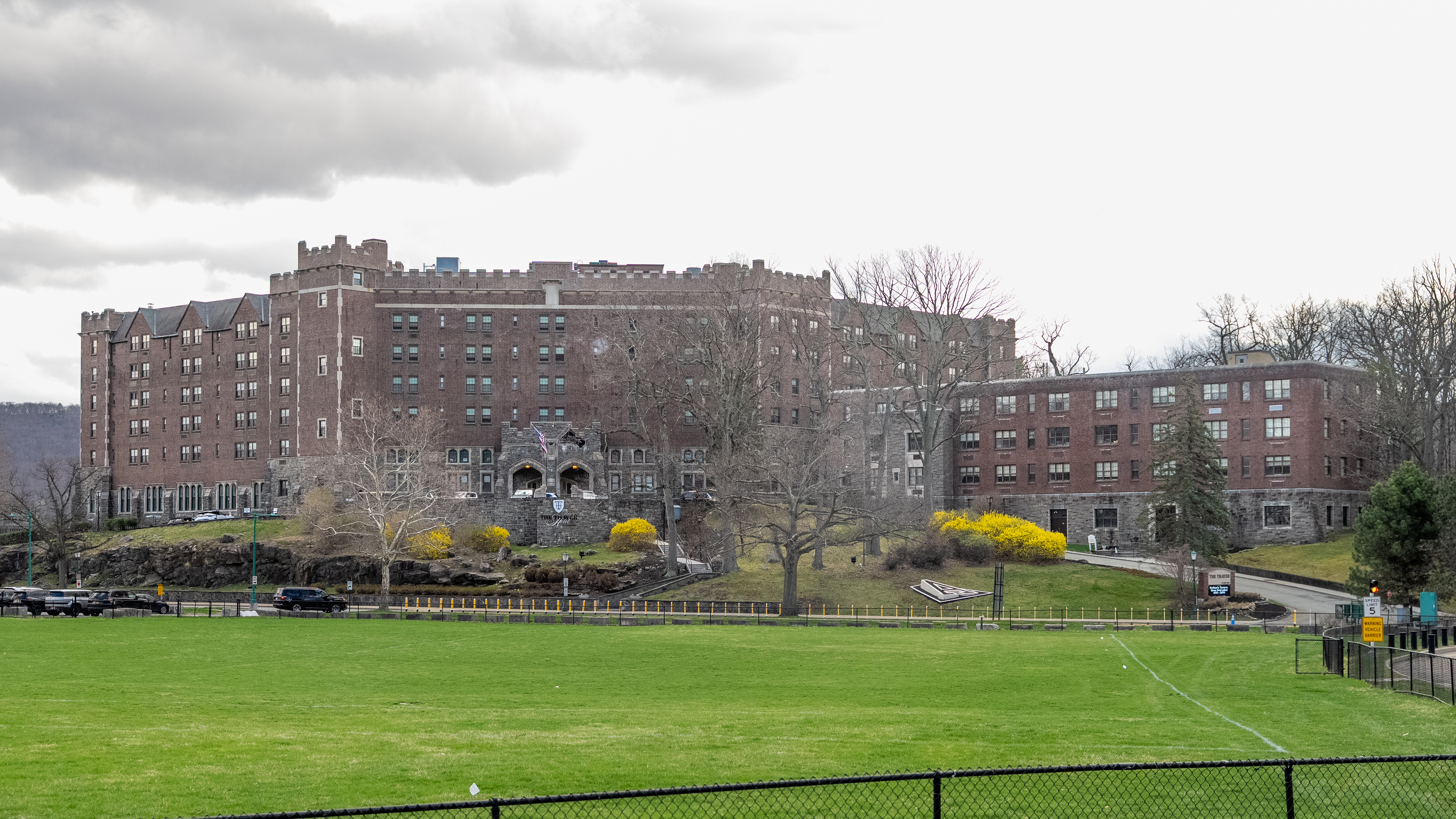
- Thayer Hotel (2026)
- Interactive map of the The Thayer Hotel area

General information
- Architectural style: Gothic Revival
- Location: 674 Thayer Road, West Point, New York, United States
- Coordinates: 41°22′37″N 73°57′42″W
- Construction started: 1925
- Completed: 1926
- Inaugurated: May 27, 1926
- Client: United States Military Academy

Technical details
- Structural system: granite
- Floor count: 5 (Main Building); 3 (Executive Suite Wing)

Design and construction
- Architecture firm: Caughey and Evans of New York

Website
- http://www.thethayerhotel.com

The Thayer Hotel is a 151-room "Historic Hotel of America" property located 50 miles north of New York City on the banks of the Hudson River at 674 Thayer Road in West Point, New York on the campus of the United States Military Academy. It is named after Sylvanus Thayer, West Point class of 1808, the "father of the Military Academy." It replaced the West Point Hotel in 1926.

The Thayer Hotel has three main markets: tourists visiting West Point, weddings, and corporate conferences. The Thayer Hotel came under new management in October 2009. The 151-room hotel has been completely renovated, re-branded, and is now being marketed to host corporate events and leadership training. Renovations completed at The Thayer Hotel in 2012, have brought about the opening of its new executive suite wing, which includes 23 suite-style rooms.

== History ==
=== West Point Hotel ===
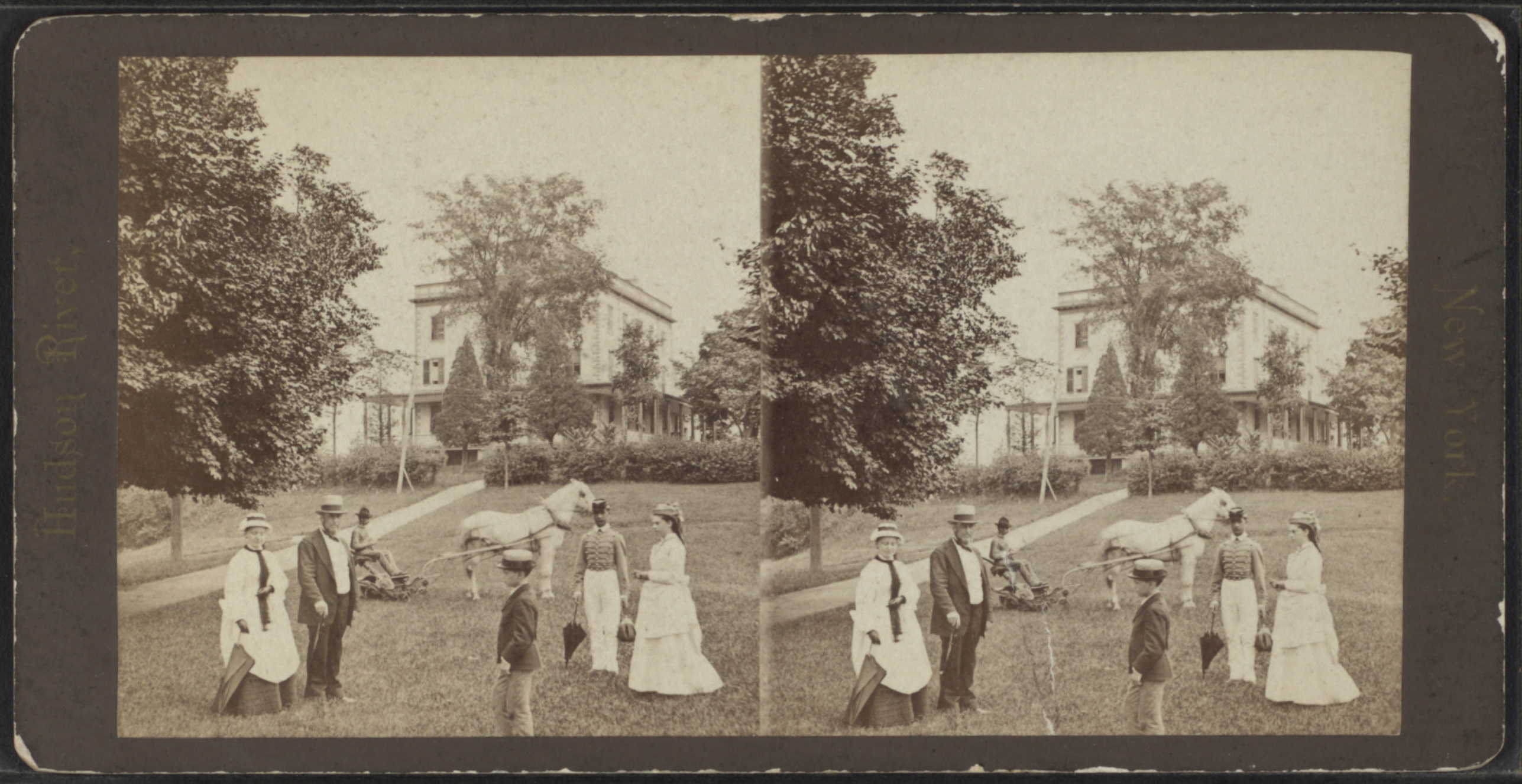
West Point Hotel, date unknown

In 1829, the West Point Hotel was built near the Plain on Trophy Point. The West Point Hotel served the academy for over a century, hosting a long list of dignitaries such as Robert E. Lee, Ulysses S. Grant, Stonewall Jackson, Winfield Scott, William Tecumseh Sherman, Washington Irving, Edgar Allan Poe, and James Whistler. During General Douglas MacArthur's time as a cadet, his mother lived in the West Point Hotel, at the time called Carney's Hotel, from 1899 to 1901.

=== Hotel Thayer ===
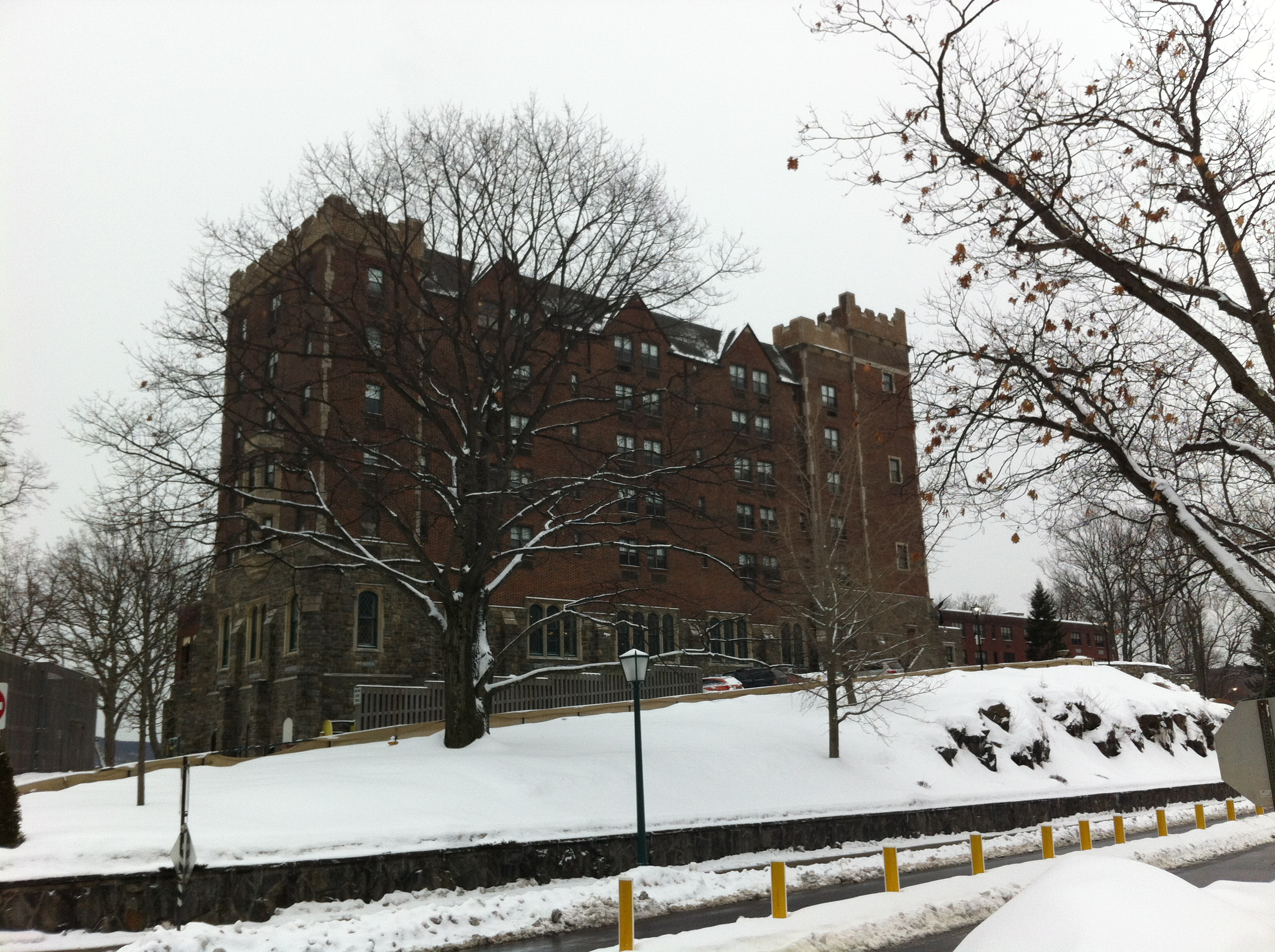
Thayer Hotel in the winter

When Brigadier General Douglas MacArthur returned from World War I to become the Superintendent of West Point in 1919, he started a major expansion program of the buildings. The new Thayer Hotel was one of these expansion projects and the Thayer Hotel officially opened May 27, 1926 with 225 rooms.

In 1981, the freed Iran hostages were housed at the hotel immediately upon their return to the United States. The former hostages spent the night at the hotel and signed a menu which is still on display in the lobby, as well as a brass plaque given by the former hostages to the Thayer Hotel, thanking the hotel for welcoming them home.

The 151 room Thayer Hotel has undergone several renovations over the years – most recently in 2012, with the opening of the 23-room executive suite wing.
