= All Saints' Episcopal Church (Briarcliff Manor, New York) =

Historic church in New York, United States

- U.S. National Register of Historic Places
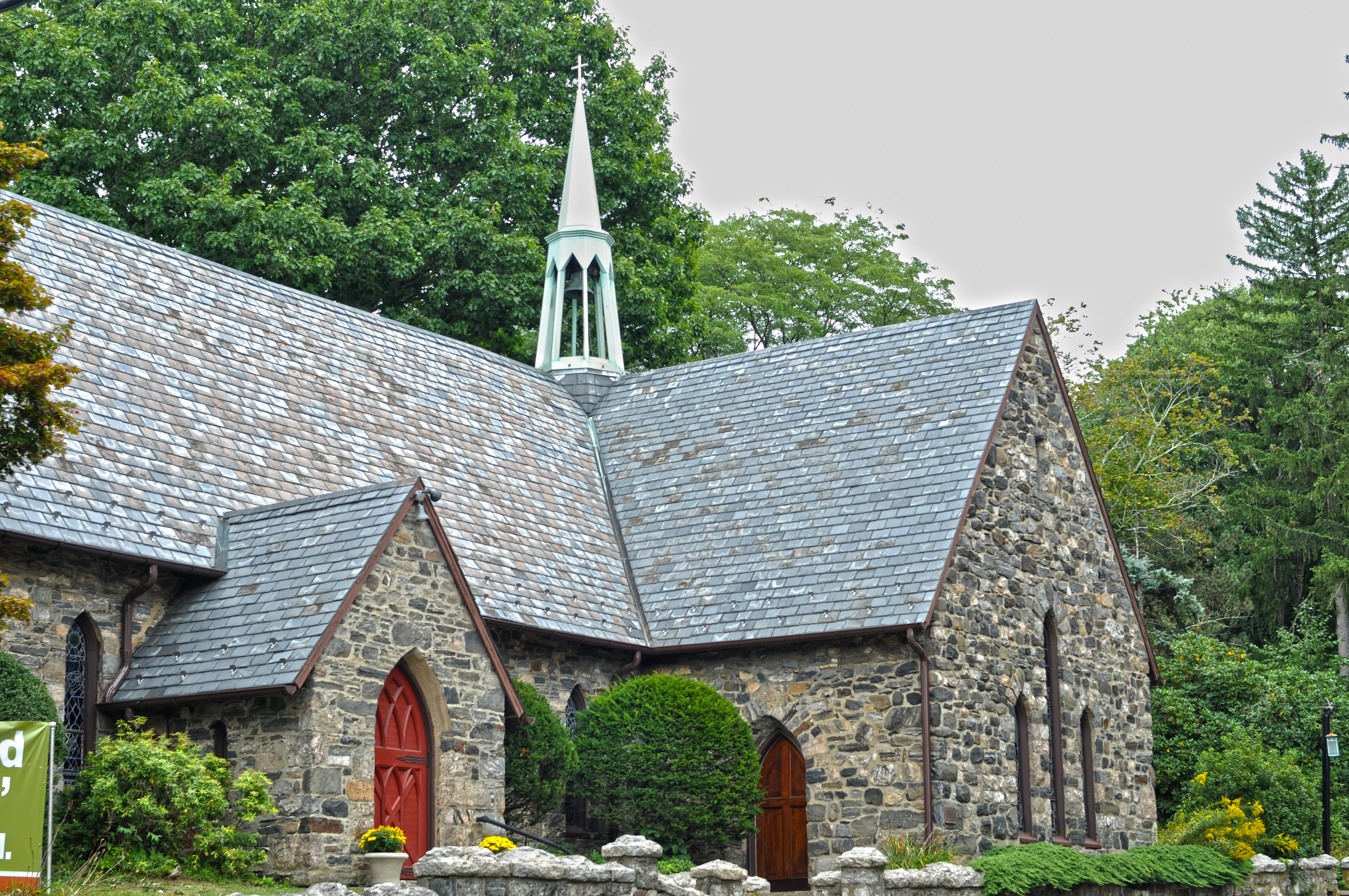
- Front entrance of the church
- Location: 96 and 201 Scarborough Road, Briarcliff Manor, New York 10510
- Coordinates: 41°08′42″N 73°50′35″W
- Area: 4 acres (1.6 ha)
- Built: 1848
- Architect: Richard Upjohn; William Henry Deacy
- Architectural style: Gothic Revival
- NRHP reference No.: 02000449
- All Saints' Episcopal Church
- Website: www.allsaintsbriarcliff.org

Clergy
- Rector: Kevin E. Veitinger
- Added to NRHP: May 14, 2002

All Saints' Episcopal Church is a historic Episcopal church in Briarcliff Manor, New York. It was added to the National Register of Historic Places in 2002. John David Ogilby, whose summer estate and family home in Ireland were the namesakes of Briarcliff Manor, founded the church in 1854. The church was built on Ogilby's summer estate in Briarcliff Manor.

Richard Upjohn designed the church building, which was constructed from 1848 to 1854 and expanded in 1911. The church has several memorial windows, including one by John LaFarge and a rose window by Frederick Wilson of Tiffany Studios.

== History ==
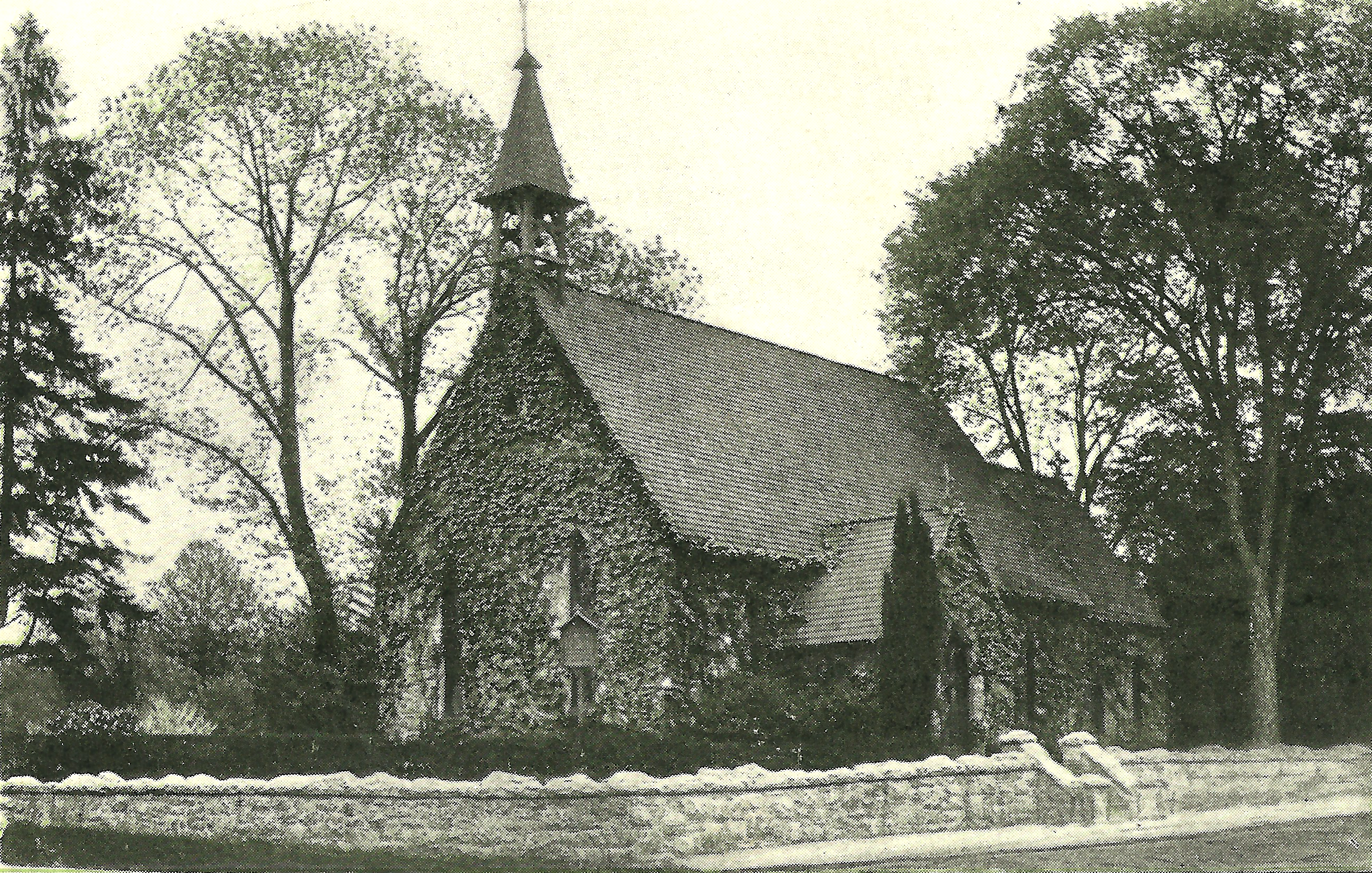
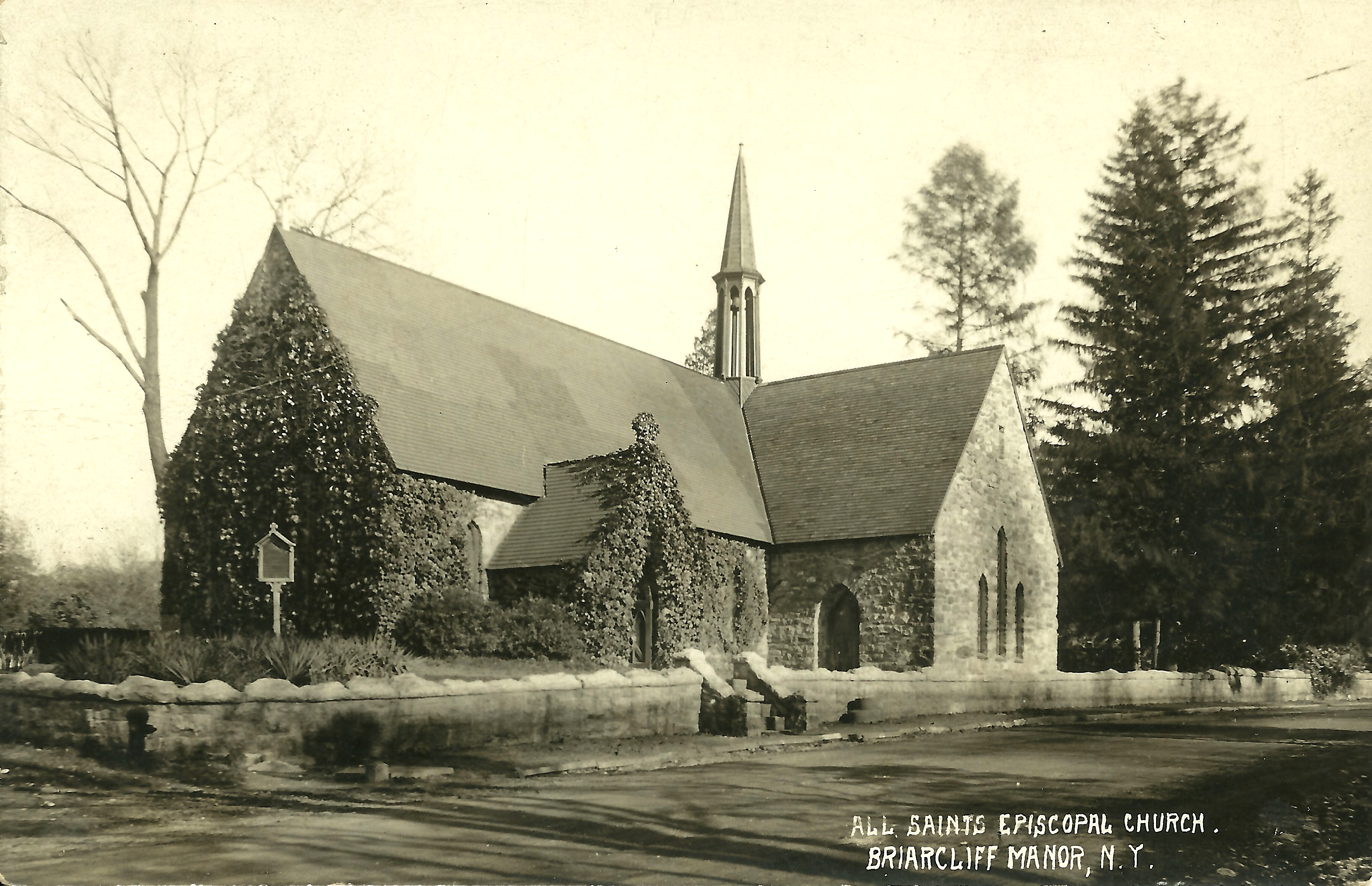
The church shortly before and after its expansion

The church's opening service was held on December 13, 1854, and Ogilby donated the church's current building and grounds in 1863. He gave the church its first name, "All Saints' Church, Brier Cliff, Sing Sing, N. Y.", naming his property Brier Cliff after his family home in Ireland. In 1910, the church building was enlarged to the present cruciform shape, and it was consecrated on November 1, 1911. In 1945, the church purchased property to the north and east of the building; a parish hall was built there in 1949 and dedicated on January 29, 1950.

In late 2006, the church was featured on Nightline and USA Today for hosting U2charists, Eucharists accompanying U2 songs; the church has held two such services. The church estimated that of the people to attend one of their U2charists, 70 percent were visitors.

Notable rectors include Thomas Hazzard and John Adams Howell. Hazzard was the founder of Hope Farm, and was a football player and coach, as well as a minister, dairy farmer, treasurer, and missionary in Liberia. John Adams Howell invented the Howell torpedo and other naval devices; he was also a rear admiral in the US Navy.

== Design ==
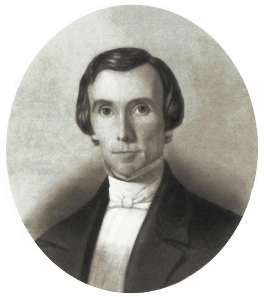
John David Ogilby, founder of the church

The church building was designed by architect Richard Upjohn and built between 1848 and 1854. The church was modeled on Saint Andrew's in Bemerton, England, and it is an example of the modest English Gothic parish church popular in the region during the mid-19th century.

The building was originally designed with a simple rectangular nave with a high-pitched slate-covered gable roof and exterior walls of random-coursed granite ashlar in the Gothic Revival style. A transept and enlarged chancel were added in 1911. There is a metal steeple at the gable crossing. Memorial windows include one by John LaFarge (1889) and a rose window "Adoration of the Magi" (1911) by Frederick Wilson of Tiffany Studios. Also on the property is a Stick Style rectory dated to 1883 and an Arts and Crafts-style Old Parish Hall built in 1904.

== All Saints' Preschool ==
All Saints ran a preschool program for children two to five years old. The program involved spiritual and ethical teaching, class trips, and activities including gym, music, playground, art, cooking, and drama.

== See also ==
- National Register of Historic Places listings in northern Westchester County, New York
