= Herbert Shipman =

American suffragan bishop

The Right Reverend Herbert Shipman D.D.
- Suffragan Bishop of New York
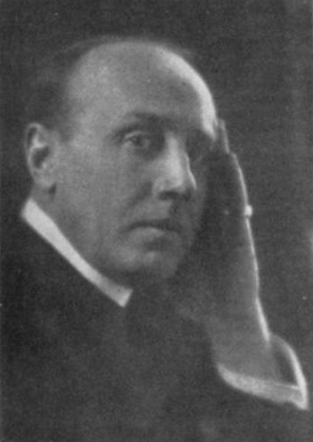
- Church: Episcopal Church
- Diocese: New York
- Elected: May 12, 1921
- In office: 1921–1930
- Successor: Charles Kendall Gilbert

Orders
- Ordination: March 17, 1895 by Henry C. Potter
- Consecration: November 30, 1921 by Daniel S. Tuttle

Personal details
- Born: August 3, 1869 Lexington, Kentucky, United States
- Died: March 23, 1930 (aged 60) New York City, New York, United States
- Buried: West Point Cemetery
- Denomination: Anglican
- Parents: Jacob Shaw Shipman & Ann Louise Gold
- Spouse: Julie Fay Bradley (m. 1889)

Herbert Shipman (August 3, 1869 - March 23, 1930) was an American suffragan bishop in the Episcopal Diocese of New York under William Thomas Manning. His older sister was author Mary Raymond Shipman Andrews.

== Early life and education ==
Shipman was born in Lexington, Kentucky, on August 3, 1869, the son of the Reverend Jacob Shaw Shipman and Ann Louise Gold. he is also a descendant of Theodore Sedgwick. He studied at Columbia University and graduated with a Bachelor of Arts in 1890. He then served as a teacher at Trinity School in New York City. After one year, he enrolled at the General Theological Seminary and earned his Bachelor of Divinity in 1894. In 1920, he was awarded a Doctor of Divinity from George Washington University.

== Ordained ministry ==
In 1896, Shipman was ordained deacon and in 1895 as priest by Bishop Henry C. Potter of New York. Between 1894 and 1895 he served as assistant rector at Christ Church in New York City, his father's church. From 1896 till 1905, he served as chaplain at the United States Military Academy in West Point, New York. On April 19, 1889, he married Julie Fay Bradley. Shipman resigned his post as chaplain in 1905 and became associate rector of the Church of the Heavenly Rest in New York City, where he also served as rector from 1907 till 1916. In 1916, he became chaplain of the First Field Artillery, where he served near the Mexican border. During WWI, he also served as chaplain of the 104th Field Artillery, a post he retained till 1918, after becoming senior chaplain of the District of Paris and of the First Army Corps in France. In 1919, he once more resumed his post as rector of the Church of the Heavenly Rest.

== Bishop ==
Shipman was elected Suffragan Bishop of New York in 1921, serving under William Thomas Manning. He was consecrated on November 30, 1921, by Presiding Bishop Daniel S. Tuttle in the Cathedral of St. John the Divine. He died on March 23, 1930 of heart disease while at luncheon in his home at 154 East Seventieth Street in Manhattan.
