= Thomas Hazzard =

American sports coach, minister, and farmer (1871–1957)

Biographical details
- Born: October 24, 1871; Titusville, Pennsylvania, U.S.
- Died: February 10, 1957 (aged 85); Millbrook, New York, U.S.

Playing career
- 1892–1893: Kenyon
- 1896–1898: Kenyon
- Position: Left tackle

Coaching career (HC unless noted)
- 1897–1900: Sidney HS (OH)
- 1901: Miami (OH)

Head coaching record
- Overall: 1–3–1 (college)

Thomas Robert Hazzard (October 24, 1871 – February 10, 1957) was an American football player and coach, minister, farmer, missionary, and riveter. He served as the head football coach at Miami University in Oxford, Ohio, in 1901, compiling a record of 1–3–1. An Episcopal clergyman, Hazzard founded Hope Farm in Dutchess County, New York, in 1907.

== Early life ==
Thomas Hazzard was born on October 24, 1871, in Titusville, Pennsylvania. He was one of nine children of Hiram and Ruby (Windsor) Hazzard. He attended Kenyon College, where he received his theological training. He was as originally part of the class of 1895, but did not graduate until 1899, with a degree in theology. While at Kenyon, he was a standout athlete and captain of the football team for two years. He later wrote about his playing days and his approach to stopping the flying wedge of the opponent. His tactic was to dive into the wedge "...grabbing up enough feet that if a pile-up didn't occur the ball carrier would be open anyway for other defenders to get."

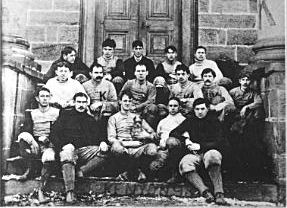
1893 Kenyon College football team

== Football coach ==
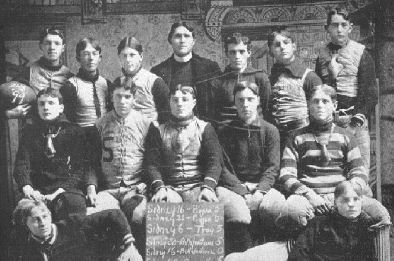
The 1899 Sidney High football team coached by Hazzard

Hazzard coached Sidney High School football team from 1897 to 1900 where he never lost a game. In 1901 he moved onto Miami University. Hazzard coached the 1901 football team at Miami, which was known for a strong defense that gave up less than six points a game. The offence had trouble scoring in the first three games, starting the season 0–2–1, with close losses to Wittenberg (12–0) and Dayton Athletic Club (5–0) and a 0–0 tie to Earlham. The joke around campus was, "if they could score they could win." They finally won in a game against Antioch College by score of 23–6. They lost their last game of the season to Denison by a score of 6–0.

Later in life, Hazzard wrote about his coaching philosophy. He stated he would lecture his player on how to play the game by telling his team stories of his playing days at Kenyon. On story was how he "...had a trick, a habit of putting the man opposite me out of business by jamming an elbow against his neck...a couple of hard ones got him a little timid."

== Church work ==
In the early 1900s Hazzard headed up the Episcopal Church in Sidney, Ohio. In 1900 he designed and built a new Church for the congregation. Hazzard's design was based on a memory of church from his past. It was designed in an English gothic styled including Flemish oak beams in the nave. Due to a tight budget, Hazzard also did a substantial amount of the manual labor to build the church including the furniture and altar. In 1902 he moved to Briarcliff, New York, to be the rector at All Saints' Episcopal Church. He served at this position until 1907, where with the urging Bishop David H. Greer, he founded Hope Farm in Dutchess County, New York. At Hope Farm he served as its first director as well as building several of the original buildings. In 1917, he resigned as director to become a riveter at International Shipbuilding Co. at Hog Island, Pennsylvania, during the war years.

After World War I, he became an Episcopal Missionary in Liberia. He spent two years in Africa before returning to New York to become a rector at several churches, including St. Peter's Church in Lithgow and St. Thomas Church in Amenia Union.

== Later life ==
In the early 1950s, Hazzard resigned his positions as rector. Later he moved into a home he shared with his son, Charles B. Hazzard. After a long illness he died on February 10, 1957, in Millbrook, New York.

=== College ===
Year	Team	Overall	Conference	Standing	Bowl/playoffs
Miami Redskins (Independent) (1901)
1901	Miami	1–3–1			
Miami:		1–3–1			
Total:		1–3–1			
