= Charles Kendall Gilbert =

American bishop (1878–1958)

The Right Reverend Charles Kendall Gilbert D.D., D.Litt., S.T.D.
- 11th Bishop of New York
- Church: Episcopal Church
- Diocese: New York
- Elected: January 26, 1947
- In office: 1947–1950
- Predecessor: William T. Manning
- Successor: Horace W. B. Donegan
- Previous post: Suffragan Bishop of New York (1930-1947)

Orders
- Ordination: June 10, 1906 by David H. Greer
- Consecration: October 28, 1930 by James De Wolf Perry

Personal details
- Born: August 6, 1878 Bainbridge, New York, United States
- Died: November 18, 1958 (aged 80) Charlemont, Massachusetts, United States
- Buried: Cathedral of St. John the Divine
- Denomination: Anglican
- Parents: Don A. Gilbert & Amelia Bixby
- Spouse: Anna Louise Brownell (m. June 21, 1906)
- Children: 1

Charles Kendall Gilbert (August 6, 1878 – November 18, 1958) was the eleventh bishop of the Episcopal Diocese of New York, serving from 1947 to 1950. He served as suffragan from 1930 to 1946. He retired in 1950.

== Education ==
Gilbert attended Hamilton College from where he earned a Bachelor of Arts in 1902 and a Master of Arts in 1905. He was awarded a Doctor of Divinity from the same institution in 1925. In 1905 he also graduated with a Bachelor of Sacred Theology from General Theological Seminary, from where he was also awarded an honorary Doctor of Sacred Theology in 1931. He was awarded a Doctor of Letters from Hobart College in 1947 and another honorary Doctor of Divinity in 1949, this time from Trinity College.

== Ordination ==
Gilbert was ordained deacon in 1905 and priest in 1906. He served as rector of Trinity Church in New Dorp, Staten Island, New York City, from 1905 till 1906. He then became rector of Grace Church in Millbrook, New York, while in 1912, he became the editor of The Churchman, a post he retained till 1918. From 1918 till 1920 he served as rector of the Church of St James the Less in Scarsdale, New York. For the next ten years he served as the executive secretary of the Social Service Commission of the Diocese of New York.

== Suffragan bishop ==
Gilbert was elected Suffragan Bishop of New York on May 14, 1930. He was elected at the 147th annual convention which took place on May 13 and 14, 1930. Gilbert was elected to replace Bishop Herbert Shipman. He was consecrated on October 28 of the same year. He served as suffragan bishop for 16 years. He succeeded Bishop Manning as Bishop of New York in 1947.

== Works ==
- The social opportunity of the churchman. Department of Christian Social Service. 1924.
- Foreigners Or Friends, a Handbook: The Churchman's Approach to the Foreign-born and Their Children. Department of missions and church extension. 1921.
- Religion in Life. Abingdon Press. 1980.

== Notes and references ==
Episcopal Church (USA) titles
Preceded by William Thomas Manning	Bishop of New York; 1947–1950	Succeeded by Horace William Baden Donegan
