= Horace W. B. Donegan =

English bishop

The Right Reverend Horace W. B. Donegan CBE
- Bishop of New York
- Church: Episcopal Church
- Diocese: New York
- Elected: 1949
- In office: 1950–1972
- Predecessor: Charles Kendall Gilbert
- Successor: Paul Moore Jr.
- Previous posts: Suffragan Bishop of New York (1947-1950); Coadjutor Bishop of New York (1950)

Orders
- Ordination: May 28, 1928 by Charles Lewis Slattery
- Consecration: October 8, 1947 by Henry Knox Sherrill

Personal details
- Born: May 17, 1900 Matlock Bath, Derbyshire, England
- Died: November 11, 1991 (aged 91) Sanibel, Florida, United States
- Denomination: Anglican
- Parents: Horace George Donegan & Emma Pembroke Hand

Horace William Baden Donegan CBE (May 17, 1900 – November 11, 1991) was a bishop of the Episcopal Church in the United States of America and served as the Bishop of New York from 1950 to 1972.

== Early life ==
Donegan was born at Cordella, the family home of his parents Horace George Donegani and Emma (Pembroke) Hand in Matlock Bath, Derbyshire. His father Horace George Donegani was a butcher who ran Donegani and Sons Butchers on the South Parade in Matlock Bath. When Donegan was ten, he and his family emigrated to the United States, settling in Baltimore, Maryland. His last name was changed from "Donegani" to "Donegan". He initially pursued a career as a stage actor. After falling in love with the daughter of his landlady (who was infuriated at the thought of an actor as her son-in-law), he decided on an ecclesiastical path. He never married, although clergy in the Episcopal Church may marry.

== Education ==
Donegan completed his undergraduate work at St. Stephen's College in Annandale-on-Hudson, New York. He later studied at Harvard Divinity School, and theology at Oxford University. He obtained his divinity degree in 1927 from the Episcopal Divinity School in Cambridge, Massachusetts.

== Ordained ministry ==
Donegan was ordained to the priesthood on May 28, 1928, and then served as curate of All Saints' Church in Worcester, Massachusetts for two years. He was rector of Christ Church in Baltimore until 1933, when he was made rector of St. James' Episcopal Church in Manhattan.

== Bishop ==
In 1947, Donegan was elected Suffragan Bishop of New York, the second-highest official of the diocese. He received his consecration that same year from Presiding Bishop Henry Knox Sherrill, with Bishops Charles K. Gilbert and Norman B. Nash assisting as co-consecrators. Donegan was the four hundred and seventy-second bishop of the Episcopal Church.

In 1949, he was chosen as coadjutor bishop of the same diocese by acclamation, the only instance of such an appointment in its history. He became the founder and president of the Board of Trustees of the House of the Reedemer, and chaired numerous national boards and committees within the Episcopal Church.

Following Gilbert's retirement, Donegan succeeded him as the twelfth Bishop of New York in 1950. Considered very liberal and socially active, Donegan was also an advocate of civil rights, defending the rights of African Americans, women, and the poor. He once declared in 1954 that the church might have to "sacrifice much that is time-honored" to address the unchanging racial and economic patterns in New York.

He once proposed a reduction of the period of Lent from forty to seven days, for "what was acceptable in the seventeenth century has become unrealistic for men and women catching commuter trains." He condemned McCarthyism in the United States, which discriminated against numerous artists and entertainers for former political alliances. He also opposed the South African policy of apartheid, which had been put into effect after World War II.

In December 1955, Donegan sponsored an apartment near the Cathedral of St. John the Divine for a family of German refugees, helping the husband find work as well. A year later, in 1956, he gave his approval to the election of women as wardens, vestry members, and delegates to the National Conventions in his diocese; he later participated in the ordination of two women, Carol Anderson and Julia Sibley, as deacons in 1971, and of one as priest in 1977.

Donegan was active in the creation of what would later become the American Priory of the Order of St John; he was appointed Sub-Prelate of the Order in 1956. In 1957, Queen Elizabeth II named him an honorary Commander of the Order of the British Empire (CBE). Also during that year, Donegan initiated a $5 million program for the construction of new churches in poverty-stricken sections of Manhattan and the Bronx, which he described as "the most strategic missionary opportunity that faces the Church."

He encouraged Episcopalians to support of John F. Kennedy in the 1960 presidential election, despite his Roman Catholic faith. Following Kennedy's assassination in November 1963, the Bishop said, "I speak for all the clergy and laity of the Diocese when I say that we are numbed with shock at the assassination of the president. He is now joined with Lincoln and McKinley in the ranks of the martyred leaders of our people."

In 1965, several parishioners in the Diocese of New York, upset by their Bishop's activism in the civil rights movement, withdrew pledges of $2 million for the completion of St. John the Divine. In response, Donegan said, "I can only hope that the Cathedral's very unfinished quality will stand as a memorial to a diocese which in the twentieth century tried to do what it believed to be right."

In an address to the Patriotic Societies of New York in 1965, Donegan expressed his incomprehension of young men's refusal to serve in the Vietnam War, even if they did not support the war. He stated, "Were it in my power, I would fine every person who did not vote, and reward doubly everyone who enlisted in the service of our country, whether as an Episcopalian in the armed forces or as Quaker in the courageous group who will carry the wounded off the field of battle."

In regards to the controversial beliefs of Bishop James Pike, Donegan once commented in 1966, when the possibility of a heresy trial was raised, "Of all the methods of dealing with Bishop Pike's views, the very worst is surely a heresy trial! Whatever the result, the good name of the Church will be greatly injured. Should there be a presentment and trial of Bishop Pike (which I hope and pray will not happen) the harm, the divisiveness and the lasting bitterness that will be inflicted on the Church we love and serve will be inevitable."

In 1967 he made the stunning announcement that he would be taking the donations for finishing St. John the Divine and put them toward housing and development projects in nearby Harlem. He once said of St. John, "This unfinished cathedral, towering as it does over this great and suffering metropolis, shall be the prophetic symbol that our society is still as rough-hewn, ragged, broken and incomplete as the building itself."

== Retirement ==
Donegan retired in 1972, after a period of twenty-two years as the spiritual leader of the Diocese of New York. He returned to St. James' Church, where he assumed the post of parish pastor. He preached occasionally and assisted at Communion. He spent his summers in his native England. His hobbies included reading biographies, listening to Gilbert and Sullivan operettas, swimming, painting landscapes, and golf.

Donegan died in 1991 from throat cancer in Sanibel, Florida, at the age of 91.

Episcopal Church (USA) titles
| Preceded by Charles Kendall Gilbert | Bishop of New York; 1950–1972 | Succeeded by Paul Moore Jr. |
