= Charles Sumner Burch =

American Protestant Episcopal clergyman

The Right Reverend Charles Sumner Burch D.D., L.H.D., LL.D.
- 9th Bishop of New York
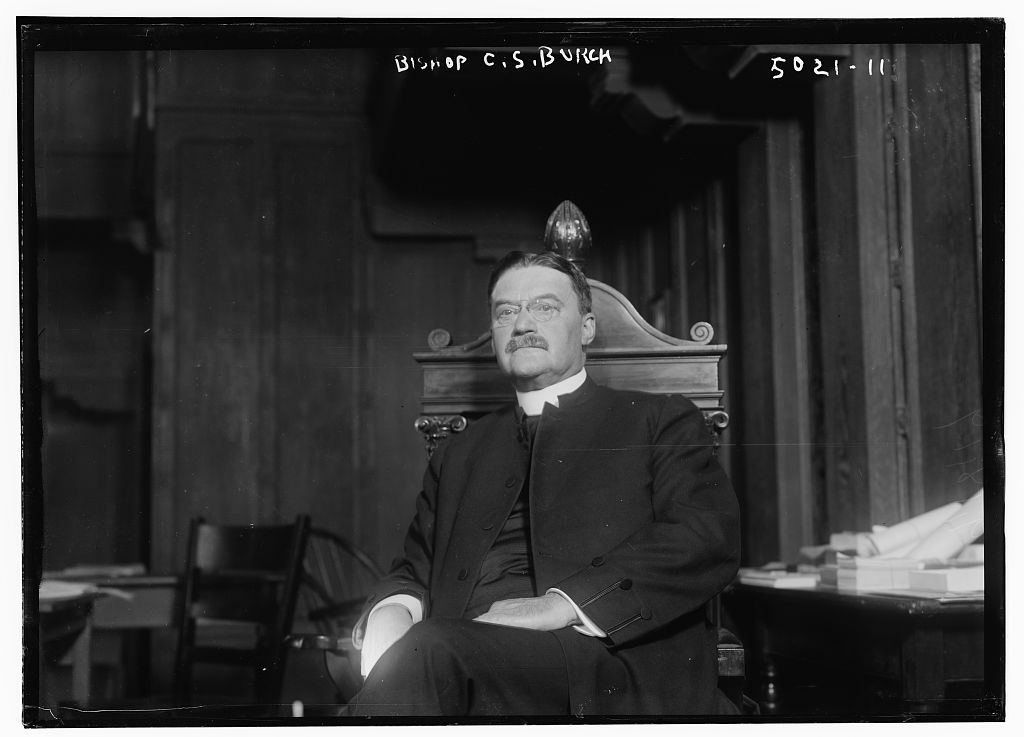
- Burch in 1919
- Church: Episcopal Church
- Elected: September 17, 1919
- In office: 1919–1920
- Predecessor: David H. Greer
- Successor: William T. Manning
- Previous post: Suffragan Bishop of New York (1911-1919)

Orders
- Ordination: 1905 by David H. Greer
- Consecration: February 24, 1911 by David H. Greer

Personal details
- Born: June 30, 1855 Pinckney, Michigan, US
- Died: December 20, 1920 (aged 65) New York City, US
- Buried: Cathedral of St. John the Divine
- Denomination: Anglican
- Spouse: Margaret Hadley (m.1878)
- Children: 3
- Education: University of Michigan

Charles Sumner Burch (June 30, 1855 – December 20, 1920) was an American clergyman who served as the 9th Bishop of New York from 1919 to 1920.

== Early life and family ==
Born to in Pinckney, Michigan, Burch was the son of Lawrence D. Burch, a writer, and Emily Dunning.

In 1876 he married Margaret Hadley, with whom he had a son and a daughter.

== Career ==
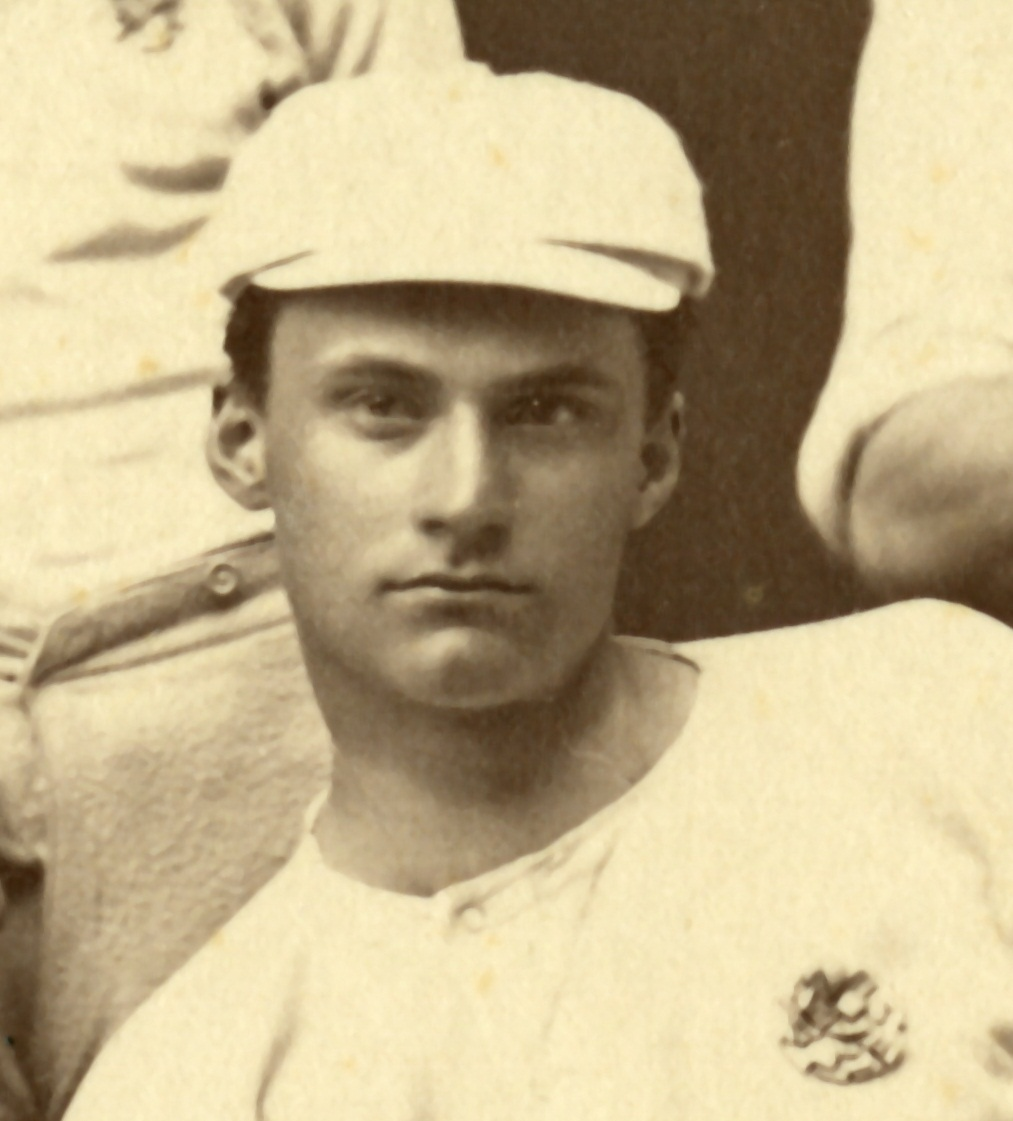
Burch at University of Michigan, 1875

=== Publishing ===
Burch graduated from the University of Michigan in 1875 and entered the publishing business in Chicago with his brothers. From 1897 to 1905 he was an editor for the Grand Rapids' Evening Press.

=== Episcopal Church ===
Burch trained at the Western Theological Seminary and was ordained as a deacon in 1895 by William Edward McLaren and as a priest in 1905 by David H. Greer. He also studied at the University of Oxford and in Germany.

He was rector of St. Andrew's Church (Staten Island) from 1905 to 1911 before being consecrated as a suffragan bishop of the Episcopal Diocese of New York in 1911, only six years after his ordination. In 1919 he succeeded Greer as Bishop of the New York, but died at the end of 1920. During his short tenure, he attended the 1920 Lambeth Conference, returning to New York with the view that closer cooperation was needed between all churches and that women should have a larger role in the church, including preaching from pulpits.

Episcopal Church (USA) titles
Preceded by David H. Greer	Bishop of New York; 1919–1920	Succeeded by William T. Manning
