= Henry C. Potter =

American Episcopal bishop (1834–1908)

The Right Reverend Henry Codman Potter
- 7th Bishop of New York
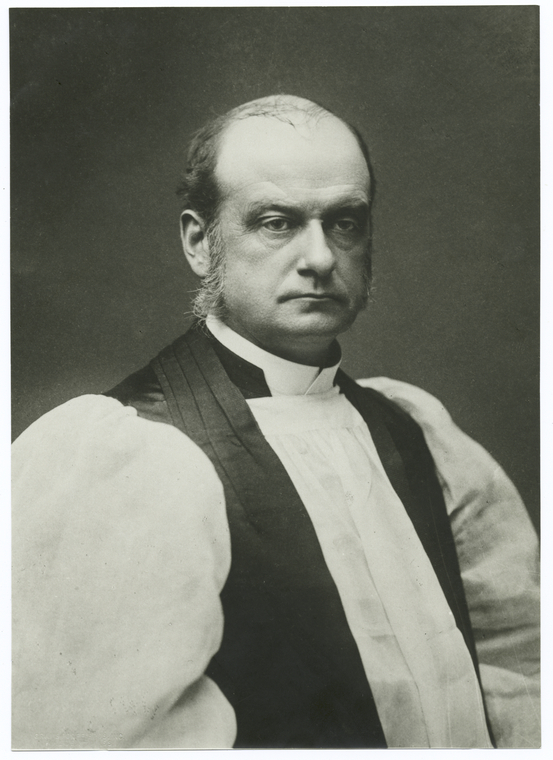
- Church: Episcopal Church
- Diocese: New York
- Elected: September 27, 1883
- In office: 1883–1908
- Predecessor: Horatio Potter
- Successor: David H. Greer

Orders
- Ordination: October 15, 1858 (priest) by Samuel Bowman
- Consecration: October 20, 1883. by Benjamin B. Smith

Personal details
- Born: May 25, 1834 Schenectady, New York, United States
- Died: July 21, 1908 (aged 74) Cooperstown, New York, United States
- Buried: Cathedral of St John the Divine, New York City
- Denomination: Anglican
- Parents: Alonzo Potter and Sarah Maria Nott
- Spouse: Eliza Rogers Jacob (m. 1858, d. 1901); Elizabeth Scriven (m. 1902)
- Education: Academy of the Protestant Episcopal Church in the City of Philadelphia and Virginia Theological Seminary

Henry Codman Potter (May 25, 1834 – July 21, 1908) was a bishop of the Episcopal Church of the United States. He was the seventh bishop of the Episcopal Diocese of New York. Potter was "more praised and appreciated, perhaps, than any public man in New York City's long list of great citizens".

== Lack of biographical materials ==
Potter "destroyed all the material which was needed to write a satisfactory" biography. Both of his major biographers, George Hodges (1915) and James Sheerin (1933), had to use "newspaper clippings", augmented by remembrances of people who knew him. Sheerin also had "access to the complete files" of George F. Nelson, who had been the Potter's secretary for much of his tenure at Grace Church and for all his years as bishop.

== Family and early life ==
In 1818, Alonzo Potter graduated from Union College in Schenectady, New York, with "the highest honors". He returned to the college as professor of mathematics and natural philosophy from 1821 to 1826. During that time (1823), he married Sarah Maria Nott, who was the college president's daughter. Henry Codman was their fifth son. Henry was born on May 25, 1834, and was baptized in St. George's Church on April 14, 1835.

In 1839, Potter's mother Sarah Nott Potter died. She was giving birth to her seventh child and only daughter. Potter was only five years old, but his father described his mother's many virtues for Henry. Among her virtues, "she gave herself, seemingly without a pang, to her household, to her friends, and to anyone whom she could make more happy". She was "a centre of delight to all who knew her".

According to his mother's request, Henry and the other children were placed under the care of his mother's cousin Sarah Benedict. Henry's father married Miss Benedict in 1840. They had three boys. Thus, altogether, Alonzo Potter had ten children: seven (six boys and one daughter) by Sarah Nott and three boys by Sara Benedict. and Henry Codman Potter's siblings were as follows:

=== By Sarah Nott Potter ===
- Clarkson Nott Potter (1825–1882) was a Democratic member of the House of Representatives after the Civil War.
- Howard Potter (1826–1897) was a New York City banker who was known for his contributions to the Metropolitan Museum of Art, the Museum of Natural History, the Children's Aid Society, and the New York Orthopaedic Hospital.
- Robert Brown Potter (1829–1887) was a United States General in the American Civil War and a financier.
- Edward Tuckerman Potter (1831–1904) was an architect who designed the Nott Memorial at Union College.
- Eliphalet Nott Potter (1836–1901) was rector of an Episcopal Church, college professor, and president of three colleges.
- Maria Louisa Potter (1839–1916) married sculptor Launt Thompson and lived in Italy.

=== By Sarah Benedict ===
- James Neilson Potter (1841–1906).
- William Appleton Potter (1842–1909) was an American architect who designed numerous buildings, including the Church of the Presidents (New Jersey) in Elberon, New Jersey.
- Frank Hunter Potter, (1851–1932) served as a first lieutenant in the American Civil War.

== Education ==
The first eleven years of Henry Codman's life were spent in Schenectady. In the Union College town and in his home, "the pursuit of knowledge" was pervasive.

In 1845, when Alonzo Potter was consecrated as bishop of the Episcopal Diocese of Pennsylvania, the Potters moved to Philadelphia, Pennsylvania. After the move, Henry (at age eleven) was having difficulty with Latin and began "a habit of swearing". Henry spent two months with the Rev. Robert Traill Spence Lowell to be tutored in Latin and to be cured of his swearing. Mr. Lowell successfully accomplished both goals.

In the spring of 1846, Bishop Alonzo Potter had the Academy of the Protestant Episcopal Church in the City of Philadelphia reopened. Henry completed his secondary education at the academy. While attending the academy, Henry showed no evidence of a call to the ministry. He did not take the classes in Greek and Hebrew offered to "candidates for the ministry".

In 1854, the nineteen-year-old Potter was working in a "wholesale dry-goods house". In August 1854, he was "converted". Little is reported about the conversion experience, but two factors contributed to it. One was a sermon preached by M. A. de Wolf Howe, rector of St. Luke's Church, Philadelphia. The other was the influence of Clara Boyd Jacobs who owned an iron mine and forge in Spring Grove, Pennsylvania. When the Alonzo Potter family visited Spring Grove, Henry came under her influence. He later said that she turned "his mind in the direction of religion".

Potter did not take a "full college course in preparation" for seminary. However, he became Self-taught by "extensive reading" throughout his life. As busy as he was, "he found time... to read". In his lectures, writings, sermons, and addresses, Potter demonstrated his wide reading. The lectures he delivered at Kenyon College in 1901 and at Yale University in 1902 showed that Potter had read John Stuart Mackenzie, Introduction to Social Philosophy, George Howell, Trade-Unionism, New and Old, Edward Bibbens & Eleanor Marx Aveling, Working Class Movement in America, Geoffrey Drage's Labor Problem, Shailer Mathews' Social Teaching of Jesus, William Hurrell Mallock, Labor and the Popular Welfare, the three volumes Sir Frederick Morton Eden, State of the Poor, the works of Frederick Denison Maurice, Charles Kingsley, and Thomas Hughes, and "other like books".

== Theological Seminary in Virginia ==
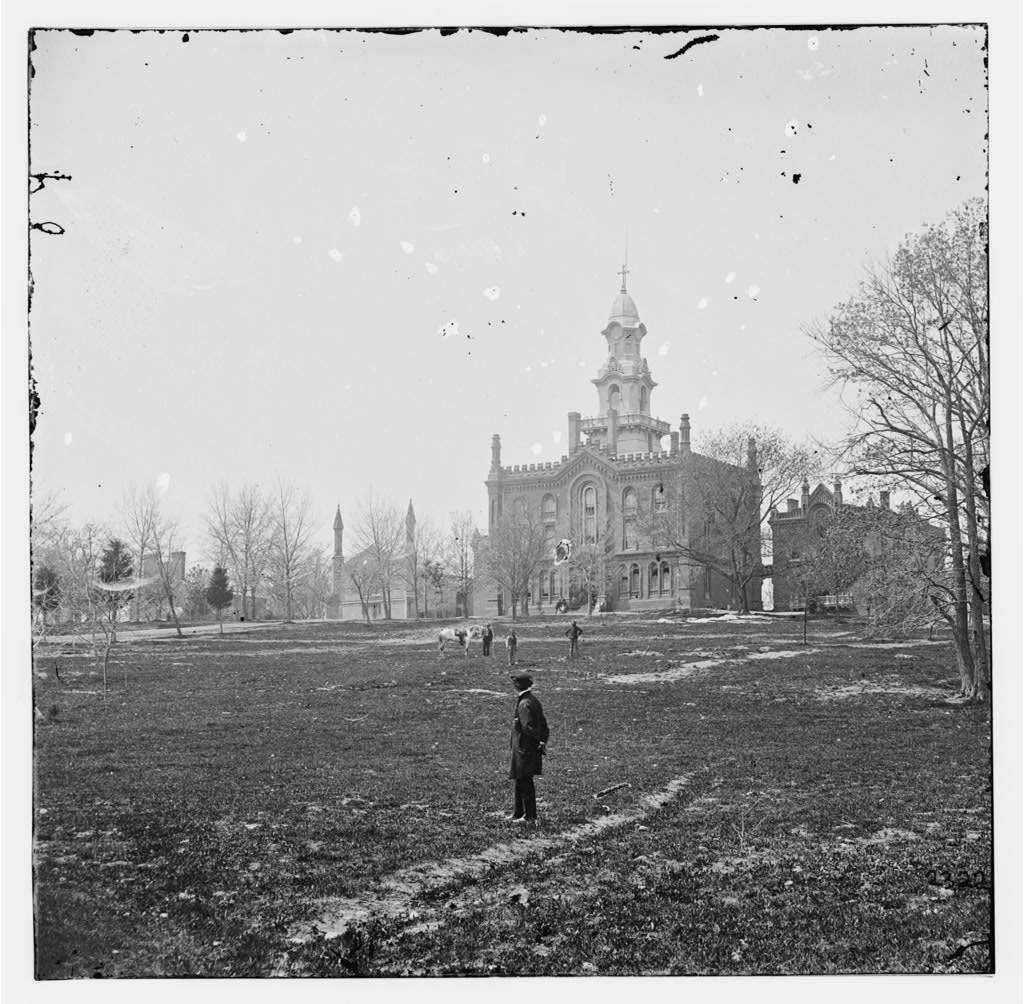
Virginia Theological Seminary in the 1860s

In 1854, Potter entered the Theological Seminary in Virginia located in Alexandria, Virginia. He graduated in 1857. Potter's father told him he needed to receive his theological education at this seminary.

Potter indicated that he was pleased with his father's choice because he was a loyal alumnus who supported the seminary with words and gifts. In 1873, while he was rector of Grace Church in New York City, he served on a committee to raise money for the seminary, On October 23, 1883, at the Episcopal Church's General Convention, Virginia Seminary alumni met. Potter "recalled pleasant incidents of his Seminary life". He also gave money for enlarging the seminary chapel and for a Bible, Prayer Books, and Hymnals for use in the chancel.

The Theological Seminary in Virginia was "pervaded by the warmth of religion, where men of a kindly and sympathetic spirit, conscientious, studious, and saintly persons, were teaching a reasonable theology". Students were encouraged "to make up their own minds". In this atmosphere, Potter was "directed and encouraged, and his life deepened and enriched".

In the summer of 1856, between his middle and senior years in the seminary, Potter was a lay-reader in a parish in Mont Alto, Pennsylvania. As the lay reader, Potter was in charge of the Sunday School. He began a church choir, and gave lectures in the nearby farmhouses. He prepared his own sermons. Writing to the parish a decade later Potter said, "Few places can have more attraction for me than Mont Alto. I look back when I remember my summer with you to some of the brightest memories of my life".

After graduating in 1857, Potter was ordained deacon on May 27, 1857, in St. Luke's Church, Philadelphia. After that, his father assigned him to the parish in Greensburg, Pennsylvania.

== Marriages and children ==
Potter was twice married: to Eliza Rogers Jacob in 1857 and to Mrs. Alfred Clark in 1902.

=== Eliza Rogers Jacob ===
On October 8, 1857, Potter married, as his first wife, Eliza Rogers Jacob. She died on June 29, 1901. They had six children:

- Alonzo Potter was in the "banking and brokerage" business and the father of movie director H. C. Potter.
- Clara Sidney Potter married Mason Chichester Davidge and later married artist Henry Fitch Taylor.
- Sarah Linzee Potter married Edwin Tatham on May 16, 1916.
- Jane Brinsmade Potter married lawyer Charles Howland Russell.
- Lena Potter married textile executive Winthrop Cowdin; she hanged herself in 1906.
- Mary Boyer Potter married portrait painter William Henry Hyde.

Potter's biographers tell little about Eliza Jacob and say nothing about how Potter felt about her. There is little information about their children in the biographies. However, from a letter written by their daughter Jane Potter Russell, "it was clear that the Potters' family life was good". The father "cared deeply for his children," his children "cared for and respected him, and "all the recollections are happy".

On June 29, 1901, Eliza Rogers Jacob Potter died suddenly at home. She was survived by a son and five daughters. The funeral was at Grace Church in New York City.

=== Mrs. Alfred Corning Clark ===
On October 4, 1902, fifteen months after the death of his first wife, Potter married his second wife, Mrs. Alfred Corning Clark (née Elizabeth Scriven) (1848–1909). Mrs. Clark, of Manhattan and Cooperstown, New York, had been a widow for six years. She belonged to the Episcopal Church, concurred with Potter's "religious and social desires," and had helped him in his work as bishop. Both families were "cordially in favor of the wedding". By this marriage, Potter gained four stepsons: Edward Severin Clark, Robert Sterling Clark, F. Ambrose Clark, and Stephen Carlton Clark. The second Mrs. Potter died on March 4, 1909 "after a short illness," less than eight months after Potter's own death.

== Ministry as priest ==
As a priest, Potter served in four parishes before becoming a bishop.

=== Christ Church, 1857-58 ===
When Potter went to Christ's Church in Greensburg, Pennsylvania in 1857, its population was "about thirteen hundred inhabitants". For intellectual friendship, Potter had only "a Roman Catholic lawyer who was a drunkard" and "an infidel physician who was a rake".

While in Greensburg, on October 15, 1857, Potter was ordained a priest by Bp Samuel Bowman of Diocese of Pittsburgh. To fulfill his "missionary obligations," Potter conducted "occasional services in adjoining towns". He bought a horse which he "fed and groomed".

In 1857, Potter refused a call to Calvary Church in a suburb of Pittsburgh. However, in May 1859 he accepted a call to St. John's Church, Troy, N.Y.

=== St. John's Church, Troy, N.Y., 1859-66 ===
Potter was the rector of St. John's Church, Troy, N.Y. from 1859 to 1866.

In the years preceding Potter's tenure, there had been "frequent changes" in rectors partly caused by "parochial disagreement". After seven years as rector, when Potter resigned, the vestry wrote him, "Before you came among us, we well remember the dissentient views that obtained not only in our own body but in the congregation which we represent". This did not happen during Potter's incumbency.

Both Potter and his wife were active in the church and in Troy organizations. After five years, the parish had grown from seventy families to a hundred and sixty. The number of communicant had increased from a hundred and fifty to three hundred and five. The church had to be remodeled to provide room for the congregation. In 1881, a later rector of St. John's said that the growth of the parish during Potter's tenure was partly due to his "remarkable personal influence" and partly to way he presented "the church's teaching" especially to people who were not members.

Potter's success at St. John's made him widely known. In 1862, he was called to Christ Church in Cincinnati, Ohio, and in 1863, he was called to St. Paul's Church in Albany, New York. In 1863, he was offered the presidency of Kenyon College. He declined them all.

In April 1866, Potter accepted a call from Trinity Church, Boston, as Assistant Minister on the Greene Foundation. The vestry of St. John's wrote him an appreciative farewell. There were "a hundred young men" at the station to bid Potter farewell when he left Troy.

=== Trinity Church, 1866-1868 ===
Potter was Assistant Minister on the Greene Foundation, at Trinity Church, Boston, Massachusetts from 1866 to 1868.

In 1866, he was made the secretary of the Episcopal Church's House of bishops and retained this position until 1883 when he was elected to the episcopate.

In 1868, Potter accepted a call to be the rector of Grace Church, New York City. The vestry of Trinity Church gave Potter a letter thanking him for "the uninterrupted prosperity spiritual and secular" he had brought to the parish.

=== Grace Church, 1868-1883 ===
When Potter became rector of Grace Church (New York City), the previous rector had just died and before that he was partially disabled by a carriage accident in 1865. Therefore, he was unable to provide leadership, and "the church drifted". The focus of its activities was its members. There were Sunday worship and a Sunday School. The women had a Sewing Society. The minister visited his parishioners. In contrast, Potter possessed "immense practical perceptions". Potter brought a different understanding of parish life. He believed that "religion should minister to the whole man". He introduced new things such as "Christmas trees, and choirs of men and boys, and daily services and weekly communions, and flowers at Easter, and church schools and church infirmaries, and parish houses". Under Potter's leadership Grace Church reached "out to an environing community".

Under Potter's leadership Grace Church became known as "New York's most picturesque and useful parish". George F. Nelson, who was Potter's assistant at Grace Church, attributes the progress to the fact that "the Rector and his Vestry were brethren dwelling together in unity. A discordant note among them was unthinkable".

==== Problem of the poor ====
The Panic of 1873 brought "hard times" for the people. This condition made Potter's work more difficult. It also made him face "the problem of the poor" and "to study it more carefully." In 1874, Potter used what he had learned in his study about poverty in his Sixth Annual Account of the Parish Work Potter when he addressed the question of how best to aid and relieve the poor. In summary, he said the following:

1. "It should be remembered, in the first place, that no rule for helping poor people, any more than any other people, can be a sweeping one of universal application."
2. There are "professional paupers." They are "not entitled to the indiscriminate benefactions" which increase the number of such paupers. The "truer and more Christian charity" would be to help them find work.
3. There are those who held "the clearest claim upon our sympathy and help." These are "the sick, the crippled, the blind or imbecile, or otherwise incapacitated; poor women and untaught childhood; children and young girls left orphaned or alone in this great city; persons of gentle nurture and antecedents who have met with reverses; all these at our doors, and then the family of the stranger and the missionary beyond them, alike have a claim." Meeting their needs should have priority
4. Finally, Potter said in his Sixth Annual Account of the Parish Work that "the cynicism and indifference which sneers at all charity alike" is worse than "the sentimentalism of indiscriminate and thoughtless charity."

On December 19, 1874, Potter was elected as bishop of the Diocese of Iowa on the second ballot. However, he declined the election because, as he said, "his commitment to Grace Church had priority."

==== Ministry to the poor ====
In October 1875, Potter called Sister Louise, a member of the Sisterhood of the Holy Communion, as Parish Visitor at Grace Chapel, and she accepted. One of the things she did was organize St. Catharine's Guild. The Guild had seventeen members. They were all working women who had families to care for. The Guild members visited and cared for "the sick poor" by sewing for and reading to them. They also helped disabled persons get to worship. They brought children to be baptized and adults to Sister Louise's Bible class, which had more than 150 members.

Potter's desire to minister to the poor was actualized by building the Grace Memorial House as a nursery and rebuilding Grace Chapel in 1876 for use as a community center offering classes teaching English and other things to immigrants.

In Potter's vision, the "ideal parish" was permeated by both a "sense of privilege" and a "sense of responsibility." Church people "should be intent not on the advancement" of the Christian Church, but on "the health, the character, and the happiness of all the citizens." This meant that serving God was not for just religious professionals, but "all are summoned to serve Him in the normal occupations of the common life." While insisting on serving God through "social service" by the parish and its members, Potter stressed "the essential necessity of the life of the Spirit." In the layout of church buildings the social service buildings, Grace Hall and Grace House, were beside Grace Chapel. This layout bore witness "to the fact that they who would serve the community well must first seek strength from on high."

==== Accomplishments ====
By the end of Potter's tenure at Grace Church, four new buildings had been built. In Grace Chapel, there were services in German. Pastoral visits were being made. The children were being instructed. There were sixteen organizations which addressed "a wide range of spiritual and physical needs." These included St. Catherine's Guild, Industrial School, St. Luke's Association, Ladies' Benevolent Society, Woman's Missionary Society, Grace House Library and Reading Room, Day Nursery, Grace House by the Sea in Far Rockaway, Long Island, St. Agnes Guild, and Ladies' Domestic Missionary Relief Association.

Henry C. Potter's uncle Horatio Potter had been bishop of the Episcopal Diocese of New York since 1854. On September 12, 1883, he asked for an assistant. On September 27, 1883, during the regular Diocesan Convention, an election was held. Potter was elected on the third ballot. He accepted the next day. He was consecrated at Grace Church on October 20, 1883.

The new bishop remained as rector of Grace Church until the end of 1883. In his last sermon, he said, "looking back today, after fifteen years and more, I rejoice to remember that this parish has at least striven to be plenteous in peace, affluent in faith, worship and good works. May God keep it so, and more and more make it so, through all the years to come."

After Potter died, a marble bust of him was placed in the north transept of Grace Church.

== Ministry as bishop ==
On September 27, 1883, Potter was elected assistant bishop to his uncle, Horatio Potter, bishop of the Episcopal Diocese of New York, and was consecrated on October 20, 1883. The full account of Potter's election as assistant bishop and his consecration can be read online at The Election and Consecration of the Rev. Henry Codman Potter, D.D., LL D.: As Assistant Bishop of the Diocese of New York (Episcopal Church. Diocese of New York, J. Pott, 1883.) Henry Potter was assistant bishop until Bishop Horatio Potter died on January 2, 1887. At that time, he became officially the Bishop of New York as he had been in fact.

On the night of his consecration, Potter visited the Midnight Mission run by the Sisters of St. John the Baptist. On the next day, he preached to prisoners in the penitentiary on Blackwell's Island.

=== Advent Mission ===
By 1883, Potter realized the Episcopal Church needed some way for "reaching sinners." Therefore, he decided to "import a successful English Missioner" for "a general revival in the Episcopal parishes of New York." During the Advent season of 1885, "the mission was held simultaneously in twenty-one parishes."

The Churchman for December 26, 1885 carried an article, which it had requested, by Potter about the mission. Potter began the article by differentiating the Advent Mission from Revivalism with its "emotional excitement." The Mission was carrying out "the idea of Advent season," namely, "preaching, personal urgency, confession of sin, communion with God in the blessed sacrament of His son." Then, while recognizing that "the results of the Mission are not easily ascertained," he outlined some of the things the mission accomplished.

1. Preparation for the Mission, by a group of clergymen, began a year before it took place. Their meetings began with "a celebration of the Holy Communion" followed by "an informal devotional meeting."
2. The Mission was "its absence of excitement." But there was "clear and faithful teaching" and a "determined endeavor to press home the truth upon the personal conscience."
3. The Mission included an "informal and personal approach to individuals" in the "personal counsels and interviews" conducted after the meetings. Potter said that there were many testimonies to the benefit of this personal approach.
4. The Mission reached the "lapsed baptized and confirmed" members. Many such people were "awakened and recalled."
5. The Mission showed "the value of informal methods" in reaching the lapsed. "Greater freedom" in prayers and hymns "brought home" what the formal Prayer Book services had not.
6. The Mission demonstrated two things: (1) "the power of the Church to reach men" and (2) "the value of trained missioners as preachers."
7. The Mission "deepened the faith" of the people carried it out.

=== Race relations ===
Race relations concerned Potter "for many years." It was not the "central issue" for him, but it was important enough to him that he "devoted considerable time and energy to it." He served on the board of the John F. Slater Fund for the Education of Freedmen. However, as with many of his contemporaries, Potter's "concern was moderate."

==== Virginia Theological Seminary: 1854-1857 ====
Potter was first involved in race relations between blacks and whites while a student at the Virginia Theological Seminary in Alexandra, Virginia. The student body was composed of students from the north and south "in about equal numbers." The question of slavery was discussed in seminary meetings with passionate disagreement. The father of the student Potter was Bishop Alonzo Potter who was anti-slavery, so it likely that his son was also.

==== American Colonization Society: 1868-1899 ====
In 1817, the American Colonization Society (ACS) was founded. Before the American Civil War, it had sent more than twelve thousand black settlers to Liberia. Two Episcopal clergymen Bishop William Meade and the Rev. William Augustus Muhlenberg supported the Society. Because of their influence, Potter became interested in the Society. In 1868, he was elected as "a life director."

In 1886, when Potter was elected as vice-president, he warned the Society that would not do much, and attended no meetings until January 1892 when he was elected as president because he had "the respect of blacks and whites." At the time of his election, Potter was in England addressing the British Christian Union about the contrast between the homogeneity of an English diocese and the "racial patchwork" of his diocese. Potter accepted the office on condition that the Society would adopt "new purposes and procedures."

In October 1892, Potter spelled out the changes he wanted. Rather than "getting rid of America's racial problem," the Society's goal should be based on "a positive interest in Africa's future." The Society should recruit "a few industrious, well-educated black people" to move to Liberia "renovate the Liberian social order" so that Liberia could "depend less on others." However, the Society was unable to recruit such people. Therefore, Potter set two other goals for the Society: (1) it would work for "the rejuvenation of the Afro-American character" in the United States, and (2) it would send "black missionaries" to Africa to teach and to convert to Christianity.

For "the rejuvenation of the Afro-American character" in the United States, Potter supported "education and equal opportunity for the freedmen." He said that "race prejudice dies slowly and hard," but, optimistically, Potter said that he thought it was "steadily diminishing." However, in the 1890s, there was a "counter attack aimed at erasing African Americans' participation in politics and the economy" by disenfranchisement in every southern state, by Jim Crow laws segregating public facilities, and by lynching. These events made Potter less optimistic about the "decline of race prejudice." He said that "prejudice" and "race antagonism" should be "outgrown," but, "as a matter of fact," they are not.

Potter's attempt to reform the Society was met with criticism from people like Wendell Phillips Garrison editor of The Nation, and his fund-raising efforts failed. On February 7, 1894, Potter spoke at the Old South Meeting House in Boston, but he aroused "more opposition than support." After Potter's speech, several "black leaders" stood to "denounce the society and Liberia." Later, a group of "black leaders" met at the Charles Street A. M. E. Church in Boston and "passed resolutions denouncing Potter's address."

Potter received verbal support from another Episcopal bishop Thomas Underwood Dudley and from Jeremiah Rankin the president of Howard University, but that did not help Potter's fund-raising effort. He made a final fund-raising effort in New York City in small meetings organized by two of his priests Percy Stickney Grant and David H. Greer, but again without success.

In addition to opposition to the cause for which Potter was working, his efforts were hampered by the Panic of 1893. This financial panic created a depression that reduced the income of all "benevolent agencies" in a "staggering" way. Potter said, "The present unexampled straitness has crippled philanthropic enterprises beyond anything I have ever known."

In 1894, a symposium was held on the subject of lynching during which Joseph Cook, a Boston preacher and editor of Our Day: A Record and Review of Current Reform, criticized Potter for his failure to speak out in opposition to lynching.

In 1899, Potter resigned as president of the Society, ending his participation. In 1911, the American Colonization Society died.

==== Race relations in Potter's religious beliefs ====
In 1865, the Episcopal Church's General Convention adopted a thanksgiving "for peace in the country and union in the Church." However, the thanksgiving did not include a "thanksgiving for the restoration of union in the nation, and for the removal of the curse of slavery." Potter expressed indignation at the convention's action. In his sermons, he "maintained that the victory over slavery was a victory for divine justice."

In 1870, the General Convention established the permanent Commission on Home Missions to Colored People. Potter attended the meetings and preached "in support of its work."

One of Potter's early acts as bishop was to take "a prominent part" in the Consecration of the Negro Samuel David Ferguson as Bishop of the Episcopal Diocese of Liberia. In 1907, the year before he died, Potter "incurred odium" during the General Convention held in Richmond, Virginia "by asking a colored clergyman to be a guest at his table."

"Human brotherhood under a divine father" was a constant theme for Potter. After the Reconstruction Era ended in 1877, he preached against the "spirit of caste" and warned of the resulting "bitter and bloody fruit." He said that the Church exists to "resist and rebuke this hateful spirit." No matter what distinctions exist in society, "inside the household of the common Father... they are to be obliterated and forgotten." However, along with his belief that blacks were "equal to whites as children of a common divine father," Potter held that blacks "needed further preparation before assuming the full rights and responsibilities of American political and economic life."

==== Racial reform ====
In the post Civil War period, white racial reformers, both religious and secular, made use of three basic strategies: "first, advocacy of civil rights for blacks; second, education for blacks in the southern states through domestic missions and philanthropic agencies; and third, support for the colonization or resettlement of blacks in Africa, especially in Liberia." As president of the American Colonization Society, Potter was "prominently involved in the colonization movement." He also "provided some support for religious and philanthropic educational work by and for blacks." However, he did not work for the civil rights of blacks. During his four decades in New York City, Potter "addressed many public issues," but there is no evidence of his speaking out on civil rights issues. Potter mentioned the lynchings of blacks only once. It was not in public discourse, but in 1898 in his "argument against U.S. administration of the Philippines."

==== Booker T. Washington ====
In June 1875, Booker T. Washington graduated from the Hampton Institute in Virginia, and Potter attended the ceremony. As Washington recalled the occasion, after giving his "graduating address," Potter took his hand and said, "If you ever come to New York and want a friend, come in and see me."

Potter also indicated that the occasion marked the beginning of a friendship with Washington. He told The New York Times in 1910 that "Mr. Washington has been on a number of occasions a guest at my table." Potter added his belief about relations between white and blacks: "It is the man, not the color or the nationality, that counts. I can see no reason why a negro, if he be a man of intellect and culture, should not be received in the home of any man." Not only were Potter and Washington friends, Potter supported Washington's educational efforts for blacks.

Washington also held Potter in high regard. After Potter died, a memorial service for him was held by the People's Institute. Washington was one of the speakers. He praised Potter for giving him "safe and sound" advice concerning black people and Tuskegee Institute and he praised Potter for "his consuming desire to serve his fellow man." He said that Potter was "always guided" by one question: "Is it the right thing to do?"

Washington recalled the last time he saw Potter in a public meeting. It was on a Sunday afternoon in a "little crowded negro church," which was not an Episcopal Church. He said that "after a busy Sunday morning," Potter arrived and "for an hour he poured out his great soul before that audience of colored men and women."

Washington closed his talk by quoting from the Robert Burns poem "A Man's A Man For A' That," in which Burns says that a "man's character" should be "the measure of a man's true worth," not "wealth, or lack of it, and social class."

=== Labor and social service ===
On May 10, 1886, Potter issued a pastoral letter to his clergy regarding labor. The Church Association for the Advancement of the Interests of Labor (C.A.I.L.) later used the document as its inspiration, especially its statement that "what the laborer wants from his employer is fair and fraternal dealing, not alms-giving; and a recognition of his manhood rather than a condescension to his inferiority." In 1892, Potter was made the association's honorary vice-president. In 1893, he was made the chairman of its Committee of Mediation and Arbitration. When the National Civic Federation was established in 1900, Potter was from the start a member of the executive committee. As such, he was involved with the steel strike of 1901 and the anthracite Coal strike of 1902. He worked for the public interest to be considered in disputes between capital and labor. In one case, President George Frederick Baer of the anthracite railways argued, "cannot I do what I will with my own?" Potter replied, "Ah, well, but what is my own?"

In August 1901, a strike by the Amalgamated Association of Iron and Steel Workers against the United States Steel Corporation "threatened to be a national disaster." Potter wrote a letter to William Randolph Hearst suggesting "a symposium of clever men discussing the question of wages, common ownership of plants and land—anything to make the people think." The symposium was held and reported in the book John Punnett Peters, Labor and Capital: A Discussion of the Relations of Employer and Employed. (1902).

In December 1902, Potter spoke to the Men's Club of Grace Chapel about what he learned from the 1901 strike. He said, "I believe in strikes. I believe also in the conservative value of the organization from which the strikes come... This Republic stands for personal freedom; anything that impairs that freedom, the country will not stand for." Looking toward the future, Potter said that he believed that "the time was approaching when strikes will cease, because men will ask themselves in the presence of their differences, not what considerations of profit and dividends, but what considerations of justice and humanity are involved."

In 1907, the General Convention of the Episcopal Church, "as a result largely of Bishop Potter's influence," action was taken to form diocesan Social Service Commissions. He chaired the one for his diocese and was active in it until his death.

In his writing, speaking, and acting Potter demonstrated that he was "frankly the champion of the working-man." He was chosen by labor unions "to arbitrate their disputes with their employers" because they were sure that he would be both fair and sympathetic. He served on the Committee on Conciliation and Mediation of the Civic Federation This position fit Potter's character which was without "partisan instincts." He worked for "truth and right" without regard for "names and labels." He was not "either socialist or capitalist." He "spoke with equal frankness" to corporate executives, many of whom he knew personally, and "to the labor unions," telling them "exactly what he thought."

=== Cathedral ===
By 1887, "the erection of a cathedral" seemed to Potter "not only important but necessary," so he issued "a public appeal to the citizens of New York" for funds to build a cathedral, which would become the Cathedral of St. John the Divine. In the appeal, Potter listed five ways that a cathedral would meet "practical and urgent demands."

1. "It would be the people's church."
2. "It would be the rightful centre of practical philanthropies."
3. "It would have a pulpit in which the best preachers... from all parts of the land... would have a place."
4. "It would be the fitting shrine of memorials of our honored dead."
5. "It would tell to all men everywhere that 'the life is more than meat and the body than raiment."

Potter said that "our democratic age demands a place of worship that will not disregard the teachings of the Founder of Christianity. In this Cathedral there will be no pews, no locked doors, no pre-payment for sittings, no reserved rights of caste or rank, but one and the same welcome for all."

There was opposition to building a cathedral, but "for the most part," people who spoke out "were in favor of the plan."

Originally, a board of trustees was convened to purchase property "below Central Park", and several donors were secured. However, there were insufficient funds to purchase the land after the donors lost money in the Panic of 1873. When Henry Potter became assistant bishop, he convened the Trustees to address the property issue. In 1887, a site was chosen on Morningside Heights about four miles north of the original choice. This placed the Cathedral "on the highest ground in Manhattan," 151 feet (46 meters) higher than Central Park.

At this time, more foreign tongues were spoken in New York than English." In making plans for the cathedral, Potter recognized that New York was a polyglot metropolis. Thus, plans for the cathedral included "seven Chapels of Tongues" about the Sanctuary for services in different languages.

In 1888, Potter was away from his diocese in England attending the Lambeth Conference. While in England, he gave "an address at Lambeth Palace commemorating the centennial of the organization of the Protestant Episcopal Church in the United States," and he preached in three cathedrals.

On December 27, 1892, the Feast of St. John the Evangelist, Potter laid the cathedral's cornerstone, and in the winter of 1896–1897, Potter worked full-time raising money for cathedral. In 1901, Potter founded the Choir School of The Cathedral of St. John the Divine."

=== Centennial sermon, 1889 ===
On April 30, 1889, Potter gave a sermon on the centennial of George Washington's inauguration in Trinity Church's St. Paul's Chapel. The President Benjamin Harrison and Vice-President Levi P. Morton of the United States were in attendance. Two former presidents were present along with "an assembly of officers of the Cabinet, senators, members of Congress, and notable citizens, including a score of governors of states." It was generally thought that Potter was the only speaker who rose to the occasion. The New York Times wrote that "the most remarkable address brought out by the centennial celebration was the sermon by Bishop Potter at St. Paul's Chapel." The full sermon can be read at A Form of Prayer and Thanksgiving to Almighty God delivered on Tuesday, April 30, 1889, the one hundredth anniversary of the inauguration of George Washington.

Potter's sermon gave him "a national reputation." He became "recognized throughout the country as a man of wisdom to understand the times, and of courage to express the convictions based on that understanding." Potter possessed a combination of "oratorical skill, episcopal status and social acceptability." These characteristics made him one of the Protestant preachers, along with Henry Ward Beecher and Lyman Abbott, most often called upon for "major public functions."

=== Personal life ===
By 1898, Potter had been bishop of New York fourteen years. People turned to Potter "not as the bishop, but the man," whose "words were heard with attention" and whose "acts were of interest to the public." He became known as "the first citizen of New York." Two noted Americans wrote Potter expressing their admiration for him. One was Henry Martyn Field, owner and editor of the Evangelist, who wrote this letter:

My dear Bishop Potter, you are the best man in the world. You always say the right word and do the right thing, but how you find the time to do it all is a mystery. Your influence goes far beyond your own Episcopal Church, large and powerful as that is, and you are equally at home among the rich and poor. I have been looking to you to solve some of the social problems that perplex us all. For my part, I am groping in the dark, but God give us light. May you live far into the next century, and help greatly to make the world purer, sweeter and happier than it now is.

The other letter came from the American author Henry van Dyke, who wrote, "I want to say to you, beneficent prelate, that there is not a preacher nor a church of any order in New York that does not reap a substantial benefit from the fact that you are the bishop of this diocese, and therefore we are all, in our several modes and manners, gratefully yours."

=== Assessing the Philippines and Hawaiian Islands ===
In May 1898, after the United States defeated the Spanish fleet in the Philippines, the United States had two colonies in the Pacific: the Philippines by conquest, the Hawaiian Islands by annexation. By action of the General Convention of the Episcopal Church of 1898, Potter and the Rev. Percy Stickney Grant were appointed to visit these two colonies and assess their missionary potential. In spite of the fact that Potter had thought that the United States action was morally "a colossal blunder," after his return to New York, he said, "We have got the responsibility of governing the Philippines, for better or for worse... It is too late to get rid of them." Based on the Potter-Grant report, the 1901 General Convention made the Philippine Islands and the Hawaiian Islands Missionary Districts and elected bishops for them: Charles Brent for the Philippine Islands and Henry Bond Restarick for the Hawaiian Islands.

=== Mayor Van Wyck ===
In May 1899, Potter called the Rev. Robert L. Paddock to be vicar of the new pro-cathedral. When Paddock reported vice in the area to the police, they insulted Paddock. He found that the police in the area were "in the pay of criminals." The September 1900 Diocesan Convention requested Potter to take action. He did so by writing Mayor Robert Anderson Van Wyck who, in turn passed the letter on to the President of the Police Board who, in turn wrote Potter that the matter would be investigated, but with no apparent action. In 1901, Potter again brought the unresolved matter to the Diocesan Convention and called for action by citizens. The citizens of New York City responded by organizing Citizens United and defeating the Tammany Hall candidates in the next election in which Seth Low was elected as mayor. Seth Low gave Potter "credit for an increased public desire for reform in civil service appointments" by his 1889 Centennial Sermon in St. Paul's Chapel."

=== Subway Tavern ===
Potter was concerned about how the "evils of alcohol" affected the poor and new immigrants. The abstinence approach was inadequate because there would always be some people who drank alcohol. So Potter decided to establish a tavern in which the staff would "monitor and guide patrons to more responsible imbibing." Because the location was near an entrance to the New York City Subway, it was called the Subway Tavern. The tavern opened on August 2, 1904. It was funded with $10,000 given by citizens including New York City alderman Herbert Parsons and former lacrosse star Elgin Gould. Potter wanted a tavern for working people which would be "jovial and free-spirited without becoming debaucherous."

In September 1905, The Advance, a weekly religious magazine, ran an article called "Bishop Potter's Subway Tavern" by a clergyman who had investigated the tavern. After giving the Subway Tavern credit for some improvements over other taverns, the clergyman deemed it morally lacking on four counts as follows:

1. Liquor sold at the tavern does not make drinkers sober.
2. A person can go to another tavern for more drinks.
3. A person can acquire the drink habit in the Subway Tavern and then drink elsewhere "to complete his ruin."
4. Even the limited drinking in the Subway Tavern might ruin a person.

In conclusion, the clergyman wrote, "So far as I could learn or observe in three visits at different hours and on two different days, the place has all the dangers which those who opposed it anticipated."

Shortly after The Advance article was published, the Subway Tavern as Potter had envisioned it closed. A commercial saloon opened in the building.

=== Pan-Anglican Congress, 1908 ===
In 1908, Potter attended the Pan-Anglican Congress in London. There were more than two hundred bishops and "several thousand clergy and laity." Group meetings were held simultaneously in halls throughout the city. Delegates looked for Potter because they viewed him "as not only the greatest representative of American churchmen but as one of whom any English speaking Christian might be proud." To them, Potter combined "human graciousness" with "official dignity." While in England, Potter "preached often in the greatest of English pulpits," such as Canterbury Cathedral, the Chapel Royal, St. Paul's Cathedral and Westminster Abbey. The Pall Mall Gazette wrote about his preaching that "even the smallest child in the gallery could understand every word."

== Lectures ==
In June 1890, Potter gave the Phi Beta Kappa address at Harvard University. His topic was "The Scholar and the State."

In 1901, Potter delivered the Bedell lectures at Kenyon College on the subject "Man, Men, and their Master."" These lectures showed Potter "at his intellectual best."

From April 21 to May 2, 1902, Potter delivered the William E. Dodge lectures at Yale University. The lectures can be read at The Citizen in His Relation to the Industrial Situation: Yale Lectures.

In October 1905, Potter lectured at the University of St Andrews in Scotland.

== Honorary degrees and Positions ==
=== Honorary degrees ===
- Union College awarded the honorary degrees of Master of Arts in 1863, of Doctor of Divinity in 1865, and of Doctor of Laws in 1877.
- Trinity College awarded the degree of Doctor of Divinity in 1877.
- Cambridge University awarded a Doctor of Laws in 1888.
- Harvard University awarded the Doctor of Divinity in 1890.
- The University of Oxford awarded a Doctor of Civil Law in 1892.
- Bishop's University awarded a Doctor of Canon Law in 1894.
- The University of Pennsylvania awarded a Doctor of Laws in 1901.
- Yale University awarded a Doctor of Laws in 1901.
- The University of St Andrews in Scotland awarded the Doctor of Laws degree in 1905.

=== Positions ===
- In 1892, the Church Association for the Advancement of the Interests of Labor (CAIL) made Potter the association's honorary vice-president.
- Potter was the first president of the Pilgrims of the United States. He held the office from 1903 to 1907.

== Declining health and death ==
On May 7, 1902, during a service in which Potter was to speak, he felt faint. He spoke, but he cleared his schedule for a rest. This was the first indication that after twenty years of demanding work as a bishop, "Bishop Potter had broken down." His feeling faint marked "the beginning of the end" for him.

In September 1902, Potter told the Diocesan Convention that he needed assistance "in the Episcopal oversight of the Diocese." As a solution, the Convention voted for the election of a Bishop Coadjutor. On October 1, 1903, David H. Greer was elected on the first ballot. Greer was consecrated on January 26, 1904. In dividing the work, Potter gave Greer the visitation of most city parishes. Potter did the visitations to the "country parishes" and "the smaller churches of the city."

In 1905, Potter made his last trip abroad. He lectured at the University of St Andrews. He preached in the Province of York and in the Province of Canterbury. From London, he traveled to Paris and wintered in Egypt. In March, he was in charge of St. Paul's Church in Rome. He spent Holy Week and Easter in Dresden, Germany. After returning to New York, he continued "speaking and preaching" and presiding over meetings and public assemblies.

In May 1908, Potter "suffered another collapse." From then on, his health became the dominant factor in his life. He was forced to decline the invitation from the Archbishop of Canterbury for the 1908 Lambeth Conference because of poor health. In July 1908, he went to his wife's summer home in the village of Cooperstown, N. Y. to recuperate. However, he was terminally ill with "arteriosclerosis, an embolism in his right leg," and chronic stomach and liver problems. So he was confined to the home. He died there on July 21, 1908.

== Funeral and interment ==
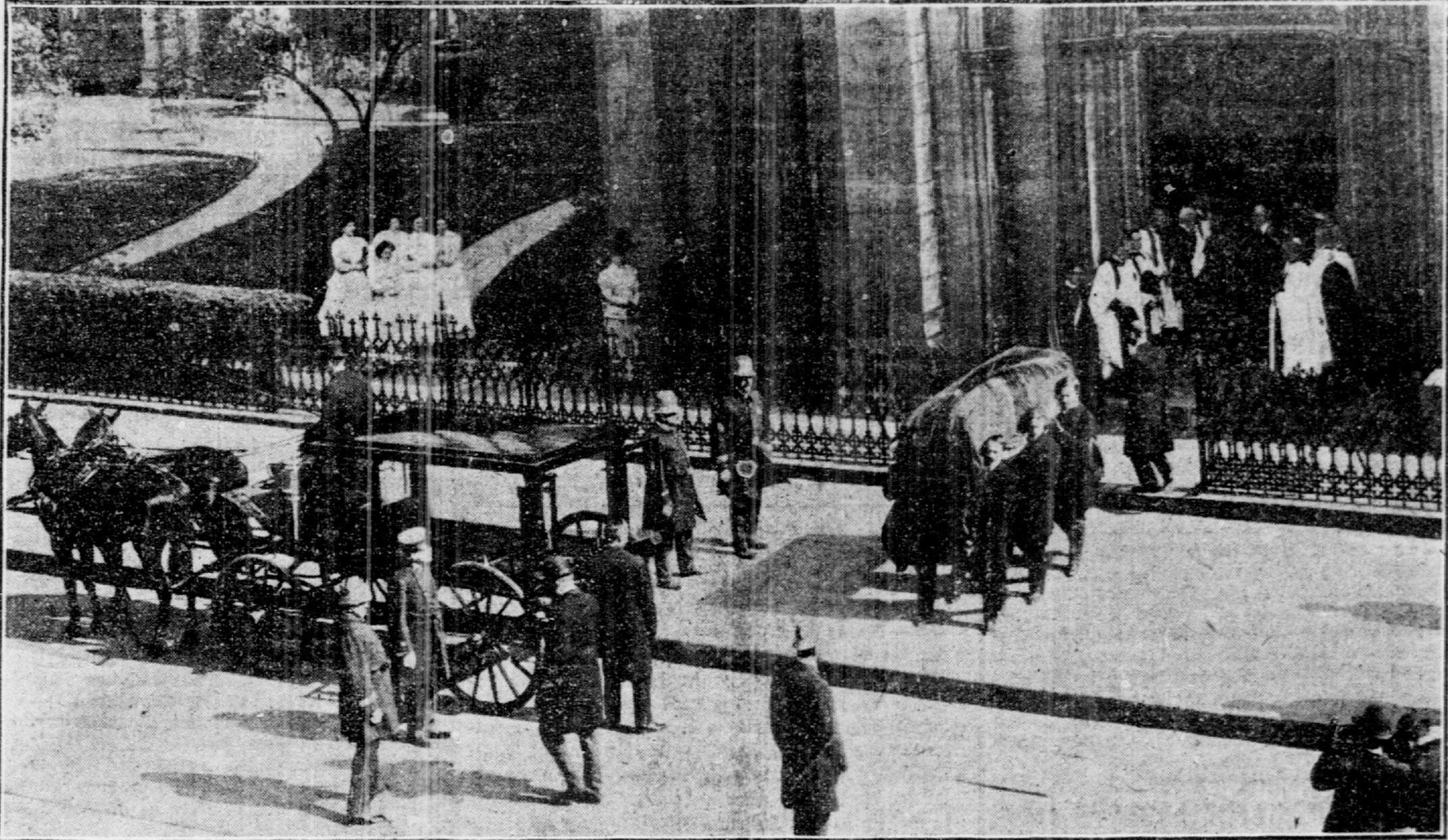
Funeral of Bishop Henry C. Potter at Grace Church, 1908

After Potter's death, there was a private service for friends and family in Cooperstown during which all the businesses were closed. The men of the village marched behind the coffin to the train station from which Potter would be sent to New York City for a later public service. Potter's body lay in state in Trinity Church, New York City until the public funeral at Grace Church on October 20, 1908, the twenty-fifth anniversary of Potter's consecration. Potter's body was interred in the crypt of his Cathedral: the first interment in the cathedral. It was later moved to the cathedral's Chapel of St. James, which had been funded by Mrs. Potter.

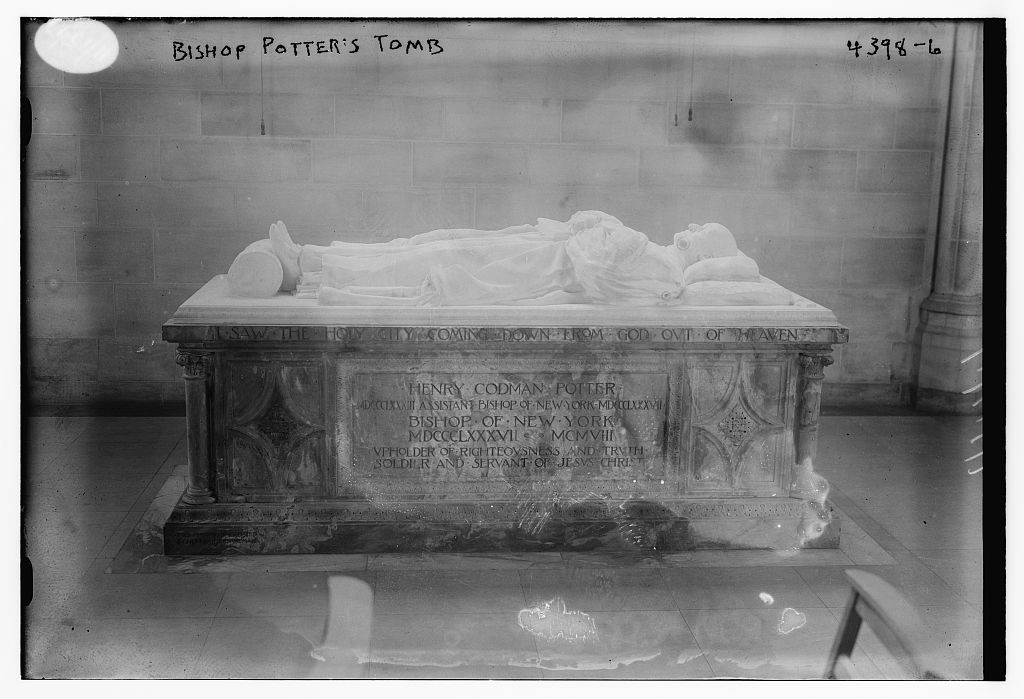
Henry Codman Potter tomb in 1917

On October 31, 1908, The Outlook carried the story of Potter's funeral in Grace Church. There were "more than five hundred" clergy in the procession, including eighteen bishops. The pall bearers were leading citizens of New York. "The church was crowded with a great congregation representing all the best elements of municipal life." The diversity of people who attended the funeral showed that Potter was "not only an ecclesiastic of great position and influence, but a great citizen, identified with many organizations dealing with the higher life of the city." Many religious leaders attended the funeral: Jewish, Presbyterian, Baptist, Methodist, Russian Orthodox, and the Persian, Greek, and Armenian Churches.

== Memorial documents ==
Two memorials were written in honor of Potter. One was by a committee of diocesan clergy; the other by a committee of the Church Association for the Advancement of the Interests of Labor (CAIL)

=== Memorial by diocesan clergy ===
A committee of diocesan clergy prepared a Memorial for Potter. The Memorial said that "he was the Citizen-Bishop. Human life appealed to him with irresistible force. Its problems and questions were of supreme concern. His interest was as far as possible from any thought of condescension or patronage. He did not force himself to show this interest. It was not the question of a duty to which he bowed himself, but rather the vital movement of his own nature. He was a man of the world in the best sense, and therefore touched the world with an ease and freedom, a sense of mastery and knowledge, a bright and eager interest in all its life, that made him above all else the citizen. He was the citizen before he became the ecclesiastic. He was the Citizen Bishop." The Memorial quoted from what was said of him by Rev. Walton W. Battershall, who was in the Diocese of Albany with Potter when Potter was in Troy, N. Y.: "He had insight, forecast, tact, knowledge of men, genial touch of men, sympathy with his period, with American methods and ideals. He was keen to catch the human appeal from all sorts and conditions of men. He had that audacity, faith, courage, and faculty for organization, that give leadership... Prayer was to him the deepest reality of his life." The memorial ended by characterizing Henry Codman Potter as a "true prophet, true priest, true bishop."

=== Memorial by CAIL ===
At the October 1908 meeting of the executive committee of the Church Association for the Advancement of the Interests of Labor (CAIL), a subcommittee was appointed to express the sorrow of the association in the loss of Potter, who had been its president. Of Potter, the Memorial said in part, "with a statesman's breadth of vision, he saw that [the great industrial problems] were the most essential problems with which, at the moment, Christianity has to grapple... Bishop Potter's services as chairman of our Committee on Mediation and Arbitration won for him on the one side, the affection and the confidence of the laboring men of this city, and, on the other side made him increasingly conscious of the necessity of official action on the part of the Church for the solution of the labor problems of the day."

== Legacy ==
A July 1908 editorial in The New York Times about Potter included the following words:

He felt profoundly the brotherhood of the race, and he manifested courage, force, independence of judgment, and great unselfishness in the application of the principle to the relations of daily life. Apart from the more specific duties of the Church, nothing engaged more intimately and passionately all the energies of his nature than systematic work for the practical application of the ideal of brotherhood to the aid of those to whom it is usually extended only in pale and ineffectual theory.

In 1908, a Memorial Meeting sponsored by the People's Institute was held in the Cooper Union. One of the speakers Rabbi Joseph Silverman said regarding Potter: "The city has been benefitted by his liberalism. Many institutions have profited through his liberality in their inception and development, and thousands upon thousands of human beings have been strengthened in mind, in heart, and in spirit by his words of beauty and of strength." Another speaker Booker T. Washington, the famous educator, summed up his speech by saying, "He never asked of a thing to do, Is it popular? He asked only, Is it the right thing to do?" A third speaker Seth Low, once president of Columbia University and mayor of New York, declared that Potter "so eagerly helped the lowly because he claimed kinship with them."

George F. Nelson, who was Potter's assistant at Grace Church, New York and Bishop Potter's secretary throughout the twenty-five years of his Episcopate, said of Potter that he was a "preacher, house-to-house pastor, organizer and director" combined in one "alive and alert" person. Everything human interested him and he viewed humanity as made in "the image of the divinity that makes all men brothers." His ideal was "to do justly, and love mercy and walk humbly with God" (Micah 6:8), and nothing could "shake his loyalty to his ideal."

The Bishop Henry Codman Potter Memorial buildings, developed by the City and Suburban Homes Company as part of their York Avenue Estate in Yorkville, Manhattan, were dedicated in 1912. They are New York City designated landmarks and on the National Register of Historic Places.

== Works ==
=== Books by Potter ===
- Sisterhoods and Deaconesses at Home and Abroad (1872).
- The Gates of the East: A Winter in Egypt and Syria (1876).
- Sermons of the City (1881).
- Addresses to Women Engaged in Church Work (1887).
- Waymarks (1892).
- Brilliaints: Selected from the Writings of Henry C. Potter by Alice L. Williams (1893).
- The Scholar and the State (1897).
- The East of To-day and To-morrow (1902).
- The Citizen in His Relation to the Industrial Situation (1902).
- Law and Loyalty (1903).
- Reminiscences of Bishops and Archbishops (1906)

=== Articles by Potter ===
- "The Uses of a Cathedral" published in The Century Magazine in February 1902.
- "Decline of the Home: The Foundation of the Nation" published in the Sunday Magazine on November 5, 1905.

=== Introductions to and material in books ===
- The Dignity of Man: Select Sermons with an Introduction by Henry C. Potter (1889).
- The Ideal Humanity and Other Parish Sermons with Some Words Commemorative by Henry C. Potter (1892).
- The Faith by Which We Stand: Sermons by John Tunis with an Introduction by Henry Codman Potter (1896).
- Principles of Religious Education with an Introduction by Henry C. Potter (1901).
- The Bible for Children with an Introduction by Henry Codman Potter (1902).
- John Punnett Peters, Labor and Capital: A Discussion of the Relations of Employer and Employed. The book was initiated by a letter by Potter which is included in the book, as well as an article by Potter. (1902).

=== Sermons by Potter ===
- "Individual Responsibility to the Nation: A Sermon" preached in 1866.
- "The Church and the Children: A Sermon" preached in 1868.
- "The Liturgy and its Use: A Sermon" preached in 1871.
- "The Building and the Builder: A Sermon" preached in 1872.
- "A Good Man's Burial: A Sermon" preached in 1872.
- "Our Brother's Blood: A Sermon" preached in 1872.
- "Zenas, the Lawyer: A Sermon" preached in 1871.
- "The Life-giving Word." A Sermon in Memory of Bishop Phillips Brooks preached in 1893.
- "The Real Lesson of Easter: A Sermon for all Creeds and Denominations" published on April 7, 1901.
- "A Sermon Preached at the Consecration of Alexander Hamilton Vinton as Bishop of Western Massachusetts" preached in 1902.
- "A Sermon Memorial of the Reverend Charles Woodruff Shields" preached on December 9, 1904.

=== Addresses by Potter ===
- A Form of Prayer and Thanksgiving to Almighty God delivered on Tuesday, April 30, 1889, the one hundredth anniversary of the inauguration of George Washington (The De Vinne press, 1889).
- Address to the Masonic Grand Chapter of the State of New York in 1903.
- The Lord's Day: a Charge Delivered to the Convention of the Diocese of New York on September 27, 1905.
- "Presentation of a Loving Cup to Mr. Nicholas N. de Lodygensky" in 1908.

Episcopal Church (USA) titles
Preceded by Horatio Potter	Bishop of New York; 1887–1908	Succeeded by David H. Greer
