= Greer School =

Founded in 1906, Hope Farm was a home and school for disadvantaged children in Dutchess County, New York, near Millbrook. The school was renamed Greer School in 1939/40, in honor of its "founding father", David Hummell Greer, the former Protestant Episcopal Bishop of New York. Bishop Greer selected the Rev. Thomas Hazzard as Hope Farm's first director. Hazzard built several of the original buildings and remained director until 1917.

The first high-school class (consisting of five students) graduated from Hope Farm School in 1932. Prior to that, students attended the public high school in nearby Millbrook, New York.

Among the early Presidents of the Board of Directors were famed orthopedic surgeon Russell A. Hibbs, Edward Pulling (founder of the Millbrook School), and Arthur W. Butler. Mathematician Herta Taussig, a refugee from Nazi Austria, taught at the school from 1944 to 1948.

The facility later came under the auspices of Greer-Woodycrest Children's Services and, in the 1980s, received many Haitian refugees.

The property is currently the site of The Fountains at Millbrook, a retirement community.
