= U2charist =

A U2Charist (also spelled eU2charist or U2 Eucharist) is a communion service, or Eucharist, accompanied by U2 songs in lieu of traditional hymns and sometimes as part or all of the service music. The music can be played from a CD or, in less common cases, performed by a live band.

The U2charist was initially started in the U.S. Episcopal Church but has been adapted by several other denominations. It is typically a liturgical service (including communion) that features the music of the rock band U2 and a message about God's call to rally around the Millennium Development Goals. The U2charist is held by supporters to be a great opportunity to reach out to people in their congregations and larger communities, especially young people, with messages of global reconciliation and justice for the poor and oppressed. Bono, U2's lead singer, has been a particularly vocal proponent of the Millennium Development Goals, and has been proclaimed as a global MDG ambassador. The U2charist seeks to raise awareness of the MDGs and call people worldwide to a deeper faith and engagement with God's mission.

== History ==
Although churches have used U2's music in liturgy for many years, the first U2charist was designed by Sarah Dylan Breuer in 2003, with the service held in Baltimore, Maryland, in April 2004. Breuer was a contributor to the book Get Up Off Your Knees: Preaching the U2 Catalog (Cowley Publications, 2003), and was inspired to create the U2charist by her reflection on spiritual themes in U2's music as she wrote her contributions to the book. The service spread quickly by word of mouth and over the Internet, particularly after the Episcopal Diocese of Maryland held a U2charist at their conference for all diocesan clergy in October 2004, after which many clergy present held U2charists with the assistance of the "Without Walls" worship team throughout 2004 and 2005, with the St. Mary's Outreach Center in Baltimore, Maryland, where the U2charist first took hold, as its base of operations.

After consulting with Breuer, the Rev. Paige Blair, rector of St. George's Episcopal Church in York Harbor, Maine, along with several of her parishioners, held her first U2charist on Sunday evening, July 31, 2005. Since that time, Blair has appeared numerous times in the media as an advocate for the U2charist.

Since the U2charist began in 2004, it spread quickly around the world, with services being held in numerous countries, including a “U2-dienst” (U2-service), started by the Rev. Jan Andries de Boer from Broek op Langedijk in the Netherlands in 2006., as well as services in Australia, Italy, and Mexico. The first U2charist in England took place on 26 May 2007 at St Swithun's Church, Lincoln Diocese with the Bishop of Grantham presiding. The U2charist Project in Lincoln was still running these services in 2011, alongside a variety of other social justice projects.

== Use of copyrighted content ==
Universal Music Publishing Group and the American Society of Composers, Authors and Publishers (ASCAP) do not require a license for U2's music to be used during U2charist services provided that:

- the context is a worship service and it is not called a concert
- all of the money raised goes to a nonprofit or non-governmental organization supporting the Millennium Development Goals with none of the money going to the hosting church
