= Elgin Gould =

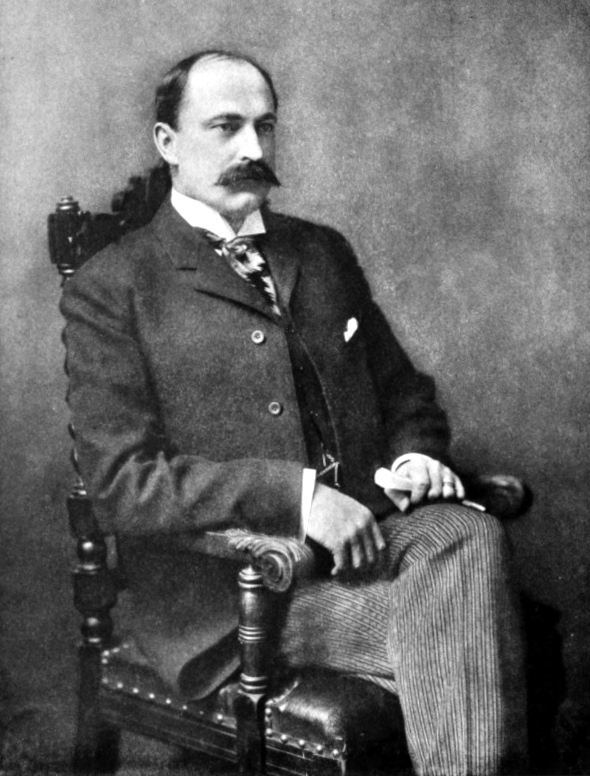

Biographical details
- Born: August 15, 1860; Ottawa, Canada West
- Died: August 18, 1915 (aged 55); Cartier, Ontario
- Education: University of Toronto

Playing career
- 1882: Johns Hopkins (football)

Coaching career (HC unless noted)
- 1883: Johns Hopkins (lacrosse)

Head coaching record
- Overall: 0–1

Elgin Ralston Lovell Gould (1860–1915) was a Canadian social scientist, educator, and lacrosse coach. In 1883, he served as the first head coach of the lacrosse team at Johns Hopkins University.

== Early life and college ==
Gould was born in Ottawa, Canada West, on August 15, 1860. He attended college at the University of Toronto and received a Bachelor of Arts degree in 1881. The following year, he emigrated to the United States and attended Johns Hopkins University in Baltimore. From 1882 to 1884, he held a Fellowship in the history and political science departments under Herbert Baxter Adams. He also played a role in increasing the importance of lacrosse at Johns Hopkins. In 1883, Gould coached the first official lacrosse Johns Hopkins lacrosse team. That inaugural season consisted of one game, in which Hopkins lost to the Druid Lacrosse Club, 4–0, on May 11. Gould also played on the first Johns Hopkins football team. Gould befriended future President Woodrow Wilson while attending the university.

== Professional career ==
He spent some time working as an assistant to statistician Carroll D. Wright at the Department of Labor in Washington, D.C. Gould received his Ph.D. from Johns Hopkins in 1886. He married Mary Hurst née Purnell of Baltimore in 1887, and they had six children, two of whom died in infancy. One of their sons, Erl Clinton Barker Gould, was an original member of the First Yale Unit prior to World War I.

Gould was then employed by the Bureau of Labor Statistics, which sent him to Europe to study living conditions of laborers. In 1892, he returned to Johns Hopkins University, and taught social sciences there until 1897. Gould then taught as a professor at the University of Chicago.

He moved to New York City where he was tasked with helping to address the city's congestion and poor housing conditions. Gould served as the city chamberlain under Mayor Seth Low. He was also a founder of the Citizens Union, a government watchdog organization established to oppose the Tammany Hall political machine.

Gould's work often concerned city sanitation and living conditions. One source wrote that he was "a major proponent of the idea of philanthropic housing". He suggested that entrepreneurs build working-class housing outside of the cities, where commuters would travel by streetcar, an emerging form of transportation at the time. His goal was to reduce the congestion and crowding in the tenement neighborhoods.

He authored at least two books, The Social Condition of Labor in 1893, and the "influential 1895 volume", The Housing of the Working People. Gould was killed in a horseback riding accident on August 18, 1915, in Cartier, Ontario.

== Published works ==
- The Social Condition of Labor (1893)
- The Housing of the Working People (1895)
