= William T. Manning =

Episcopal bishop of New York (1866–1949)

The Right Reverend William T. Manning D.D., D.C.L., LL.D.
- 10th Bishop of New York
- Church: Episcopal Church
- Diocese: New York
- Appointed: January 26, 1921
- In office: 1921–1946
- Predecessor: Charles Sumner Burch
- Successor: Charles K. Gilbert

Orders
- Ordination: December 12, 1891 by William Ford Nichols
- Consecration: May 11, 1921 by Daniel S. Tuttle

Personal details
- Born: May 12, 1866 Northampton, England
- Died: November 18, 1949 (aged 83) New York City, United States
- Buried: Cathedral of St. John the Divine
- Denomination: Anglican
- Parents: John Manning & Matilda Robinson
- Spouse: Florence Van Antwerp (m. Apr. 1895)
- Children: 2

William Thomas Manning (May 12, 1866 – November 18, 1949) was a U.S. Episcopal bishop of New York City (1921–1946). He led a major $10 million campaign to raise funds for additional construction on the Cathedral of St. John the Divine, and directed a program to train and employ men from the neighborhood as skilled artisans during the Great Depression and later.

In 1939-40, Manning took a leadership role in the successful effort to force the City University of New York to rescind their offer of a professorship to the philosopher Bertrand Russell.

== Biography ==
=== Early life and education ===
William Thomas Manning was born in Northampton, England in 1866. His family moved to the United States in 1882, when he was 16 years old. He entered the University of the South (Sewanee, Tennessee) in 1888, where he studied under William Porcher Du Bose. He obtained a B.D. degree in 1894.

=== Career ===
Manning became a deacon on December 12, 1889, and was ordained as a priest on December 12, 1891. He was called to the following:

- Rector of Trinity Church, Redlands, California (1891–1893)
- Professor of Systematic Divinity at the School of Theology of the University of the South (1893–1895)
- Rector of St. John's Church, Lansdowne, Pennsylvania (1896–1898)
- Rector of Christ Church, Nashville (1898–1903)
- Vicar of St. Agnes', New York (1903–1904)
- Assistant rector of Trinity Church, New York (1904–1908)
- Rector of Trinity Church, New York (1908–1921)
- Bishop of New York (May 11, 1921 – December 31, 1946)

When the Bishop was asked whether salvation could be found outside the Episcopal Church, he replied, "Perhaps so, but no gentleman would care to avail himself of it."

One year prior to the U.S. entering World War I, Manning said:

Our Lord Jesus Christ does not stand for peace at any price...Every true American would rather see this land face war than see her flag lowered in dishonor...I wish to say that, not only from the standpoint of a citizen, but from the standpoint of a minister of religion...I believe there is nothing that would be of such great practical benefit to us as universal military training for the men of our land.

If by Pacifism is meant the teaching that the use of force is never justifiable, then, however well meant, it is mistaken, and it is hurtful to the life of our country. And the Pacifism which takes the position that because war is evil, therefore all who engage in war, whether for offense or defense, are equally blameworthy, and to be condemned, is not only unreasonable, it is inexcusably unjust.

During World War I, Manning served as a volunteer chaplain at Camp Upton.

Bishop Manning supported the Oxford Groups of the 1930s (not to be confused with the Oxford Movement of the 1830s, of which he was also a supporter) and in 1925 helped the Rev. Sam Shoemaker become rector of Calvary Church, where Shoemaker revived the dwindling missionary congregation and later helped found Alcoholics Anonymous.

From 1922 to 1924, Bishop Manning was in the public eye because of controversies with the Rev. Percy Stickney Grant, who expressed a radical point of view. Manning also came into conflict with the Rev. William Norman Guthrie, because of dancing and other innovations at his religious services in St. Mark's in-the-Bouwerie, New York City. In 1925, he prohibited Guthrie from inviting "Bad Bishop" Brown to speak at St. Mark's. When he preached a sermon critical of Judge Ben Lindsey's position on marriage, the judge was ejected from the service and arrested for disorderly conduct. In 1930, his preaching in favor of apostolic succession prompted public debate in the Episcopal press, and in 1934, he was an influential campaigner at the 51st General Convention. He held that the Episcopal Church was "fundamentally and definitely Catholic" in view of its apostolic succession, which should not be compromised for the sake of union with Protestant churches.

In 1933, he attended a rally at Madison Square Garden alongside Reform Jewish Rabbi Stephen Wise, protesting anti-Jewish legislation by the Nazi regime in Germany.

After the war, as Bishop of the Cathedral of St. John the Divine, Manning led a $10,000,000 capital campaign to revive construction and complete more sections of the church. Under his direction, the cathedral employed and trained neighborhood men as skilled stonemasons and carvers during the decades of the continuing project.

Bishop Manning dedicated The Church of the Epiphany on New York City's Upper East Side on October 29, 1939.

In 1939–40, Bishop Manning took a leadership role in the successful effort to force the City University of New York to rescind their offer of a professorship to the philosopher Bertrand Russell. Russell had publicly testified of his atheism in his book What I Believe, and of his support for what was then called "free love" in Marriage and Morals. A Manhattan court granted victory to Manning and his allies in Kay v. Board of Higher Education, better known as The Bertrand Russell Case.

Manning retired in 1946, and died in 1949. On his retirement, Time magazine noted that "his vigilant guardianship of orthodoxy has often made New York’s Bishop look something of a prim curmudgeon" as well as "his battles with advocates of easy divorce, isolationists, opponents of pan-Christian unity, proponents of a Presbyterian-Episcopalian merger." The New York Times, fifteen years after his death, called him "one of this country's best-known churchmen" and wrote that his forthright and fiery sermons, based on the belief that religion is involved in all of life, raised scores of controversies." He was buried in the Cathedral of St. John the Divine.

=== Legacy and honors ===
- For his service during World War I, he was awarded the chevalier of the Légion d'honneur of France and an officer of the Order of the Crown of Belgium.

Episcopal Church (USA) titles
Preceded by Charles Sumner Burch	Bishop of New York; 1921–1946	Succeeded by Charles Kendall Gilbert
