= David H. Greer =

American Protestant Episcopal bishop

The Right Reverend David H. Greer D.D., LL.D.
- 8th Bishop of New York
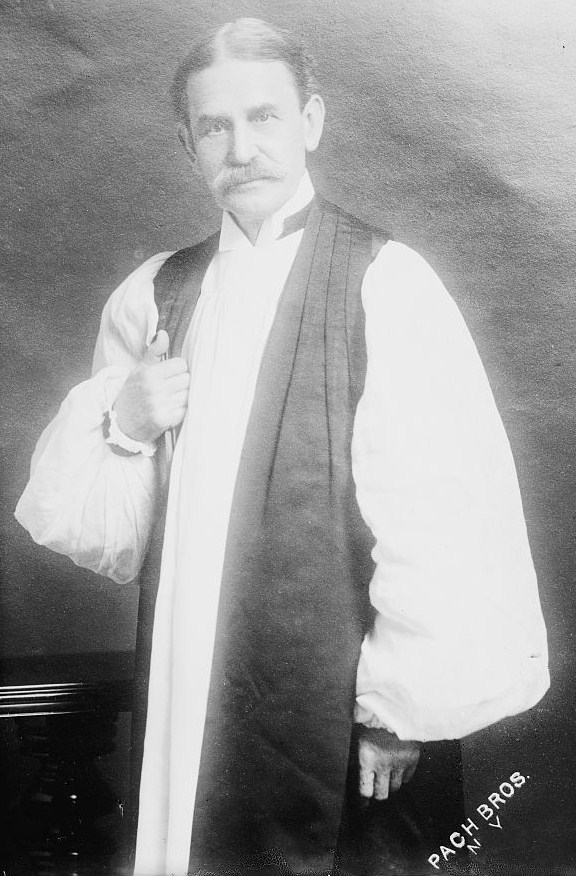
- Church: Episcopal Church
- Diocese: New York
- In office: 1908–1919
- Predecessor: Henry C. Potter
- Successor: Charles Sumner Burch
- Previous post: Coadjutor Bishop of New York (1904-1908)

Orders
- Ordination: May 19, 1868 by John Johns
- Consecration: January 26, 1904 by Henry C. Potter

Personal details
- Born: March 20, 1844 Wheeling, West Virginia, United States
- Died: May 19, 1919 (aged 75) New York City, New York, United States
- Denomination: Anglican
- Parents: Jacob Rickard Greer and Elisabeth Yellott Armstrong
- Spouse: Caroline Augusta Keith (November 19, 1845 – June 17, 1919) (m. 1869)
- Children: 3
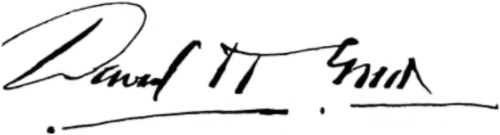
- Signature

David Hummell Greer (March 20, 1844 – May 19, 1919) was an American Protestant Episcopal bishop.

== Biography ==
He was born in Wheeling, Virginia, (now West Virginia), graduated from Washington College (Pa.) in 1862, and studied at the Protestant Episcopal Seminary, Gambier, Ohio. Ordained a priest in 1868, he was rector successively at Covington, Kentucky (1868–1871), Providence, Rhode Island (1871–1888), and New York City at St. Bartholomew's Church, 1888–1904.

In 1903, he was elected Bishop Coadjutor for the New York diocese and in 1908 succeeded Bishop Potter upon the latter's decease. He was replaced as rector of St. Bartholomew's Church by Dr. Leighton Parks.

Bishop Greer made himself known as an untiring personal worker in his parishes and his diocese, and as a believer in direct and unceremonious relationship between clergy and laymen. In 1913, he celebrated a service for the General Convention at St. John the Divine, at which an offering of $500,000 was collected, requiring three clergymen to bring it to the altar, and all night for expert bank tellers to count the funds. The service was followed by a reception for 5,000 at the Metropolitan Museum of Art. In 1914, Bishop Greer was appointed president of the Church Peace Union.

Prior to 1917, Greer caused controversy by expressing opposition to US involvement in World War I. However, after the United States entered the war, Greer endorsed the war effort as a "great crusade against tyranny and aggression".

On January 14, 1915, he officiated at the society wedding of a future bishop, the Rev. G. Ashton Oldham, to debutante Emily Pierrepont Gould at the Cathedral of St. John the Divine.

In 1869, Greer wed Caroline Augusta Keith, with whom he had three children. David and Caroline Greer died one month apart, in May and June 1919, respectively. Following his death, the Hope Farm School in Dutchess County, New York, was renamed "Greer School".

== Publications ==
- Moral Power of History (1890)
- From Things to God (1893)
- The Preacher and his Place (1895)
- Visions (1898)

== Other sources ==
Episcopal Church (USA) titles
Preceded by Henry C. Potter	Bishop of New York; 1908–1919	Succeeded by Charles S. Burch
