= Edwin Warren Saphore =

Bishop of the Episcopal Diocese of Arkansas

The Right Reverend Edwin Warren Saphore D.D.
- Bishop of Arkansas
- Church: Episcopal Church
- Diocese: Arkansas
- Elected: June 20, 1935
- In office: 1935–1938
- Predecessor: James Ridout Winchester
- Successor: R. Bland Mitchell
- Previous post: Suffragan Bishop of Arkansas (1917-1935)

Orders
- Ordination: June 2, 1898 by Frederic Dan Huntington
- Consecration: August 24, 1917 by Daniel S. Tuttle

Personal details
- Born: September 17, 1854 Rahway, New Jersey, United States
- Died: May 22, 1944 (aged 89) Syracuse, New York, United States
- Denomination: Anglican
- Parents: Daniel A. Saphore & Martha Warren
- Spouse: Frances E. Cumber (m. 1884)
- Children: 2
- Education: Pennsylvania State University

Edwin Warren Saphore (September 17, 1854 - May 22, 1944) was bishop of the Episcopal Diocese of Arkansas between 1935 and 1938.

== Early life ==
Saphore was born in Rahway, New Jersey on September 17, 1854, the son of Daniel A. Saphore and Martha Warren. He received a Bachelor of Arts from the Pennsylvania State University and then studied theology at Madison Seminary. He received an honorary Doctor of Divinity from the University of the South. He was ordained deacon on June 11, 1897, and priest on June 2, 1898, by Bishop Frederic Dan Huntington of Central New York. He was married to Frances E. Cumber in 1884, and had a son and a daughter.

== Ministry ==
After ordination, Saphore served as rector of Christ Church in Jordan, New York until 1899, when he became rector of the Church of St John the Divine in Syracuse, New York. between 1901 and 1906, he was rector of St Paul's Church in Watertown, New York, while between 1906 and 1908, he served as rector of All Saints' Church in Syracuse, New York. between 1900 and 1903, he also served as professor at St Andrew's Divinity School in Syracuse. He was appointed Archdeacon of Arkansas in 1909, and retained the post until 1917.

== Bishop ==
Saphore was elected Suffragan Bishop of Arkansas in 1917 and was consecrated on August 24, 1917, by Presiding Bishop Daniel S. Tuttle, in St Luke's Church, Hot Springs, Arkansas. He oversaw the leadership of the diocese as an authority between 1931 and 1935, in the absence of a diocesan bishop. He was elected diocesan bishop of Arkansas on June 20, 1935, and was installed on April 22, 1936, in Trinity Cathedral. He retired shortly afterward on January 1, 1938, due to ill health. He died on May 22, 1944, in Syracuse, New York.
