= Larry R. Benfield =

American bishop (born 1955)

The Right Reverend Larry R. Benfield
- Bishop of Arkansas
- Church: Episcopal Church
- Diocese: Arkansas
- Elected: November 11, 2006
- In office: 2007–2024
- Predecessor: Larry Maze
- Successor: John T. W. Harmon

Orders
- Ordination: 1990 by Maurice Benitez
- Consecration: January 6, 2007 by Katharine Jefferts Schori

Personal details
- Born: July 28, 1955 (age 71) Johnson City, Tennessee, United States
- Denomination: Anglican

Larry R. Benfield (born July 28, 1955) is the thirteenth bishop of the Episcopal Diocese of Arkansas.

Benfield was born in Johnson City, Tennessee, on July 28, 1955. He studied at the University of Tennessee, graduating in 1977 with a Bachelor of Arts in agricultural economics, and later a Master of Arts in Business Administration from the Wharton School of the University of Pennsylvania in 1979. He then worked in commercial banking in Houston, Texas. He also studied for the ordained ministry at the Virginia Theological Seminary, and earned a Master of Divinity in 1990.

Benfield was ordained deacon and priest in 1990 by Bishop Maurice Benitez of Texas. Between 1990 and 1992 he served as chaplain at Texas A&M University. In 1992 he became curate of St Mark's Church in Little Rock, Arkansas, and later became its interim rector. In 1996 he became interim rector of St Luke's Church in Hot Springs, Arkansas, while in 1998 he went to work as executive for planned giving and later as canon for administration in the Diocese of Arkansas. In 2001 he became rector of Christ Church in Little Rock, Arkansas.

On November 11, 2006, Benfield was elected Bishop of Arkansas on the seventh ballot. He was consecrated on January 6, 2007, at the Episcopal Collegiate School in Little Rock. In 2007 he received an honorary Doctor of Divinity (D.D.) degree from the University of the South. In 2008 he received an honorary Doctor of Divinity degree from the Virginia Theological Seminary.

Benfield announced his retirement 8 June 2022.

== See also ==
- List of Episcopal bishops of the United States
- List of bishops of the Episcopal Church in the United States of America
