= Tony Clavier =

English bishop (1940–2025)

Anthony Forbes Moreton Clavier (19 April 1940 – August 2025) was the archbishop of the American Episcopal Church, a Continuing Anglican denomination.

== Biography ==
Clavier entered the Bernard Gilpin Society, Sands House in Durham, England, in 1958, leaving a year later to take a job as a teacher. In 1961, he was ordained a minister of the Countess of Huntingdon's Connexion. He then became involved in a number of independent churches. He was ordained by Francis Everden Glenn in the Catholic Episcopal Church in 1962. In April 1963 he was ordained by Charles Dennis Boltwood of the Free Protestant Episcopal Church. In May 1963 he was ordained by Charles Leslie Saul of the English Episcopal Church. In 1965 he associated himself with Archbishop Gerard George Shelley of the Old Roman Catholic Church, only to leave and be ordained again by Hugh George de Willmott Newman of the Catholic Apostolic Church. He remained with that church until 1967 when he left for America.

Upon arriving in America, Clavier joined the Anglican Orthodox Church, staying with it until he returned to England and the Catholic Episcopal Church there.

In 1969, Clavier returned to the United States. He became a priest under James Hardin George of the American Episcopal Church. On 11 February 1970, George consecrated Clavier as a bishop and appointed him as a suffragan. Later that year, George resigned and Clavier served as primate for the next six years. Harold L. Trott became primate in 1976, only to leave office in 1981 with Clavier once again taking the position as primate.

In 1995, after allegations that he had attempted to have sexual relations with ten female parishioners, Clavier resigned his position at the Deerfield Beach Anglican congregation in the Anglican Church in America. In July 1995, the house of bishops subsequently declared that he had abandoned his vows and deposed him. The local standing committee refused to pursue charges against him. Clavier was received into the Episcopal Church in 1999 as a priest by Bishop Larry Earl Maze of the Episcopal Diocese of Arkansas.

Clavier served as an editor of The Anglican Digest.

== Published works ==
- Why a New Church?, 1964
- False Motives, 1964
- English Old Catholicism, 1965
