= Edward L. Salmon Jr. =

American bishop

The Right Reverend Edward Lloyd Salmon
- Bishop of South Carolina
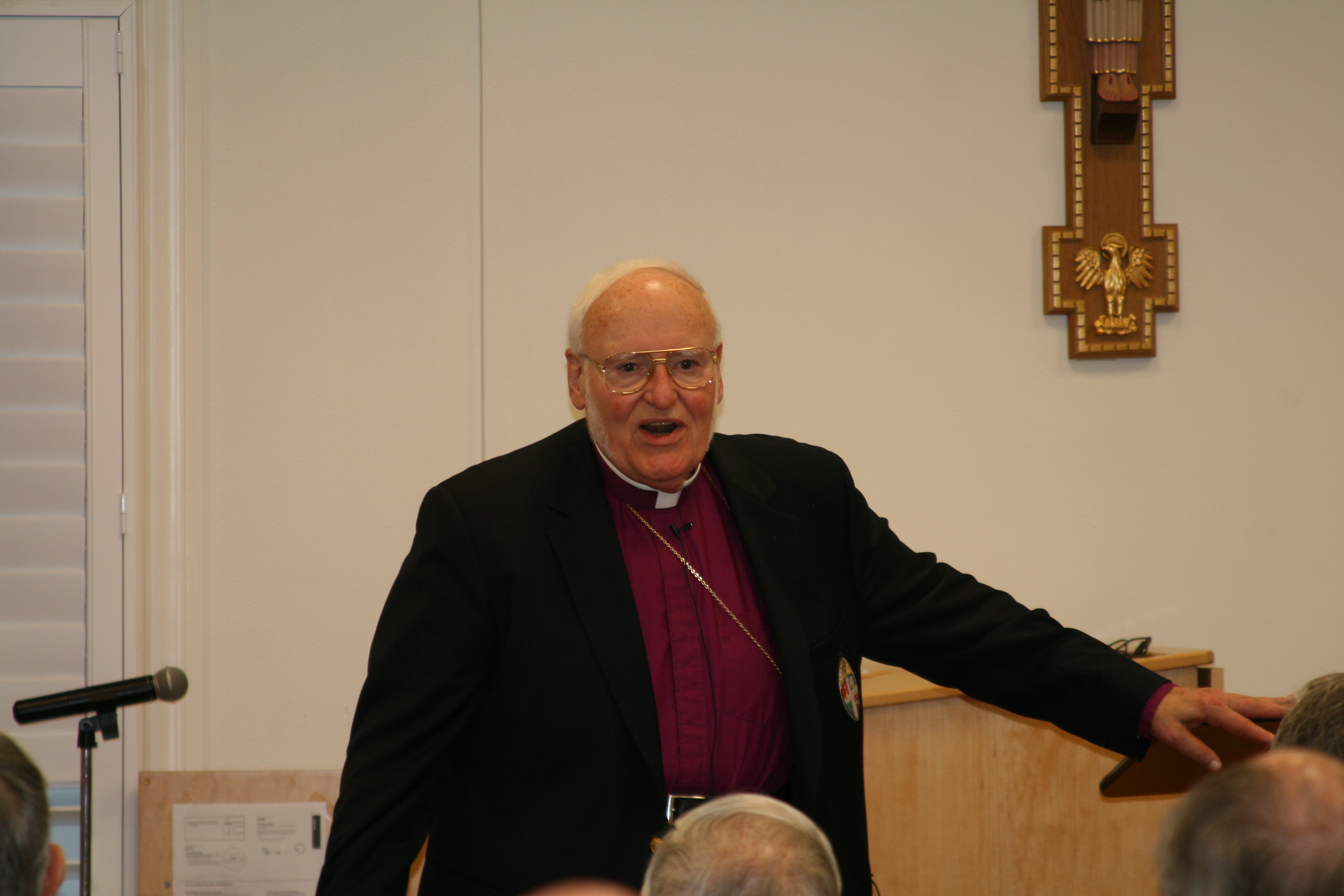
- Church: Episcopal Church
- Diocese: South Carolina
- Elected: September 9, 1989
- In office: 1990–2008
- Predecessor: C. FitzSimons Allison
- Successor: Mark Lawrence

Orders
- Ordination: March 24, 1961 by Robert R. Brown
- Consecration: February 24, 1990 by Edmond L. Browning

Personal details
- Born: January 30, 1934 Natchez, Mississippi, United States
- Died: June 29, 2016 (aged 82)
- Denomination: Anglican
- Parents: Edward Lloyd Salmon & Helen Bernice Burley
- Spouse: Louise Hack (m. 1972)
- Children: 2
- Education: University of the South

Edward Lloyd "Ed" Salmon, Junior (January 30, 1934 – June 29, 2016) was an American bishop in The Episcopal Church.

== Biography ==
Born in Natchez, Mississippi, he received his bachelor's degree from the University of the South and a bachelor's degree in theology from Virginia Theological Seminary. In 1961, he was ordained a priest for the Diocese of Arkansas in The Episcopal Church. From 1990 to 2008, he served as bishop of the Diocese of South Carolina. He was a noted conservative who remained in the Episcopal Church, unlike his former diocese.

He was a member of Communion Partners, an Episcopal group which opposed the 77th General Episcopal Convention's decision to authorize the blessing of same-sex marriages in 2012. The measure to allow the blessing of same-sex unions won by a 111–41 vote with 3 abstentions.

He chaired the board of The Anglican Digest for 41 years. After retiring from his episcopal see, Salmon served as the dean of Nashotah House Theological Seminary in Wisconsin.
