= Denby (surname) =

Denby is a surname. Notable people with the surname include:

- Charles Denby (disambiguation), several people including:
  - Charles Harvey Denby (1830–1904), U.S. Civil War officer, diplomat in China
  - Charles Denby Jr. (1861–1938), U.S. diplomat, scholar of Chinese culture
- Cindy Denby (1955–2026), American politician
- David Denby (academic), Irish academic, senior lecturer in French
- David Denby (born 1943), U.S. journalist, film critic for The New Yorker
- Edwin Denby (disambiguation), several people including:
  - Edwin Denby (poet) (1903–1983), U.S. poet, novelist, dance critic
  - Edwin Denby (politician) (1870–1929), U.S. politician, Secretary of Navy, noted in the Teapot Dome Scandal
- James Denby (1892–1977), English footballer
- Joolz Denby (born 1955), British poet and novelist
- Kara Denby (born 1986), U.S. swimmer
- Lorraine Denby, American statistician and Civil Air Patrol pilot
- Sam Denby (born 1998), U.S. YouTuber
