= Christoph Keller Jr. =

American bishop (1915–1995)

The Right Reverend Christoph Keller Jr.
- Bishop of Arkansas
- Church: Episcopal Church
- Diocese: Arkansas
- Elected: June 28, 1967
- In office: 1970–1981
- Predecessor: Robert R. Brown
- Successor: Herbert A. Donovan Jr.
- Previous post: Coadjutor Bishop of Arkansas (1967-1970)

Orders
- Ordination: March 25, 1957 by Robert R. Brown
- Consecration: June 28, 1967 by John E. Hines

Personal details
- Born: December 22, 1915 Bay City, Michigan, United States
- Died: May 19, 1995 (aged 79) Alexandria, Louisiana, United States
- Denomination: Anglican
- Parents: Christoph Keller, Margaret Ely Walter
- Spouse: Caroline P. Murphy (m. 1940)
- Children: 6
- Education: Washington and Lee University

Christoph Keller Jr. (December 22, 1915 – May 19, 1995) was the tenth bishop of the Episcopal Diocese of Arkansas from 1970 to 1981. He served as a member of The Living Church Foundation during his tenure as bishop. The library of the General Theological Seminary in New York is named in his memory.

== Early life and education ==
Keller was born on December 22, 1915, in Bay City, Michigan, son of the Reverend Christoph Keller (1883-1965) and Margaret Ely Walter (1878-1917). He graduated from Washington and Lee University with a Bachelor of Arts in 1939, and was awarded an honorary Doctor of Divinity degree in 1973. The University of the South also awarded him a Doctor of Divinity in 1968. During World War II he served in the Marine Corps, and then entered business. He studied at the General Theological Seminary, graduating with a Bachelor of Divinity in 1957, and earning a Doctor of Sacred Theology in 1968. He married Caroline Patience "Polly" Murphy (1922-2014) on June 22, 1940, and together they had six children.

== Ordained ministry ==
Keller was made deacon on July 11, 1956, at St Mary's Church in El Dorado, Arkansas, by Bishop R. Bland Mitchell of Arkansas. He was then ordained priest on March 25, 1957, by Bishop Robert R. Brown. In 1957, he became vicar of St James' Church in Eureka Springs, Arkansas, St John's Church in Harrison, Arkansas, and St Andrew's Church in Mountain Home, Arkansas, where he remained until 1962. In 1962, he became rector of St Andrew's Church in Jackson, Mississippi, and became its first dean when the church became a cathedral in 1966.

== Bishop ==
Keller was elected Coadjutor Bishop of Arkansas on June 28, 1967, during the 95th diocesan convention held in Trinity Cathedral. He was consecrated on October 17, 1967, in Trinity Cathedral, by the Presiding Bishop, John E. Hines. He succeeded as diocesan bishop on November 1, 1970. He retired in 1981.

Keller died in Alexandria, Louisiana, on May 19, 1995, following a long illness.
