= Denbigh (disambiguation) =

Denbigh is a town in Wales, United Kingdom.

Denbigh may also refer to:

== People with the name ==
- Earl of Denbigh, various holders of the title of nobility in the Peerage of England
- Kenneth Denbigh (1911–2004), British chemical thermodynamics researcher

== Places ==
=== Australia ===
- Denbigh, Cobbitty, a heritage-listed farm in Sydney, New South Wales

=== Canada ===
- Denbigh, Ontario, part of the township of Addington Highlands

=== United Kingdom ===
- Denbigh, a town in north Wales
  - Denbigh (UK Parliament constituency), 1918–1983
  - Denbigh Boroughs (UK Parliament constituency), 1542–1918
- Denbigh, Milton Keynes, Buckinghamshire, England

=== United States ===
- Denbigh, Virginia, a neighborhood in Newport News, Virginia
  - Denbigh Plantation Site
- Denbigh, North Dakota, a town near Lake Souris
- Cape Denbigh, a headland in Seward Peninsula, Alaska

== Other uses ==
- Denbigh (ship), a blockade runner in the American Civil War
- Denbigh Flint complex, a Bronze-Age, Paleo-Inuit culture of the American Arctic

== See also ==
- Denbigh School, Shenley Church End, Milton Keynes, England
- Denbighshire, a county (and principal administrative area) of Wales
  - Denbighshire (historic), a larger, traditional county of Wales
- Denby (disambiguation)
