= Edward Thomas Demby =

American bishop and author

The Right Reverend Edward Thomas Demby
- Suffragan Bishop of Arkansas
- Church: Episcopal Church
- Diocese: Arkansas
- Elected: 1918
- In office: 1918–1939

Orders
- Ordination: May 8, 1899 by John Franklin Spalding
- Consecration: September 29, 1918 by Daniel S. Tuttle

Personal details
- Born: February 13, 1869 Wilmington, Delaware, United States
- Died: April 14, 1957 (aged 88) Cleveland, Ohio, United States
- Buried: Lake View Cemetery
- Denomination: Anglican
- Parents: Edward T. Demby IV & Mary Anderson Tippett
- Spouse: Polly Alston Sherrill (died 1899) Antoinette Martina Ricks (m. 1902; died 1957)
- Education: Wilberforce University

Edward Thomas Demby (February 13, 1869 – April 14, 1957) was an American bishop and author. Ordained as a priest in the Episcopal Church of the United States and later a suffragan bishop in the Diocese of Arkansas and the Southwest, Demby worked against racial discrimination and for interracial harmony, both within and outside of his church.

== Early and family life ==
Born in Wilmington, Delaware, in 1869, the eldest child of Edward T. Demby IV and Mary Anderson Tippett (both freeborn), Edward Demby received his initial education from his uncle, Eddy Anderson, who operated a school behind Ezion (Northern) Methodist Episcopal Church, a pillar of Wilmington's African American community. He then moved to Philadelphia, Pennsylvania, to attend the prestigious Institute for Colored Youth and then to Baltimore for the Centenary Bible Institute. He also attended Howard University in Washington, D.C., Wilberforce University in Ohio and University of Chicago, and taught younger children to support himself.

Demby's first wife, Polly Alston Sherrill, died while he was serving in Tennessee. He then moved to St. Augustine's Church in Kansas City where, in 1902, he married Antoinette Ricks who had been one of Howard University's first nurse graduates and was then head nurse at Kansas City's Freedman's Hospital.

== Ministry ==
From 1894 to 1896, by then ordained an African Methodist Episcopal Church minister, Demby was dean of students at Paul Quinn College near Dallas, Texas. While there he was confirmed in the Episcopal Church. Bishop John Franklin Spalding of the Episcopal Diocese of Colorado became his mentor and ordained him a deacon in 1898 and a priest the following year. First assigned to Mason, Tennessee, Demby served as rector of St. Paul's Church in Mason, as well as principal of St. Paul's Parochial School, and vice principal of Hoffman Hall. From 1900 to 1907 he ministered to parishes in Kansas City, Missouri, Cairo, Illinois, and Key West, Florida.

Demby experienced the institutionalized segregation of the Jim Crow South. He returned to Tennessee in 1907 as rector of Emmanuel Church in Memphis, where he helped the African American congregation build its own church, as well as established first a boarding then an industrial school. Nonetheless, that year, he condemned Booker T. Washington for being too servile to whites and denounced his system of industrial education as not in the interest of many blacks, siding with W.E.B. DuBois. Although Demby initially favored the missionary bishop plan for church service among African Americans, as opposed to the suffragan bishop plan ultimately selected by the General Convention that year, he became secretary of the “colored convocations” (segregated southern churches) and Archdeacon for Colored Work in the Episcopal Diocese of Tennessee.

After his 1918 consecration as a bishop at All Saints' Church in St. Louis, Demby became suffragan bishop of Arkansas (the first African American to become bishop, although James Theodore Holly had become bishop of Haiti and Archdeacon James Solomon Russell of Virginia (likewise an educator and missionary among African Americans) had declined the Arkansas position, as W.E.B. DuBois noted.) Demby worked with black hospitals, schools and orphanages, as well as sought full recognition of African Americans within the Episcopal Church. He found that he had no salary and no official residence, and described the experience as "building bricks without straw." In 1922, the national church began paying him a salary, some of which he used to establish Christ Church Parochial and Industrial School in Forrest City, Arkansas. Demby also dealt with the fallout from Bishop William Montgomery Brown's joining the Old Catholic Church, which had led to an Episcopal Church trial for heresy and Brown's deposition in 1925.

The Great Depression negatively affected not only congregants, but also Demby's dream of self-sufficient black episcopal congregations. In 1932, racist elements within the Arkansas diocese held a convention at Newport which purported to elect a new bishop, whom the next General Convention refused to recognize. Nonetheless, by 1934, Demby was again a bishop in name only he and turned his attention to work on the national level. He served on the Forward Movement Commission, the Joint Commission on Negro Work (which influenced the General Convention of 1940 to abandon the Missionary District plan), and the Race Relations Commission. He was also active on the Southern Conference on Human Welfare, the American Association of the Advancement of Colored People, the American League for a Free Palestine, the American Humane Society, and the Sociology Society.

Demby founded and edited The Southwest Churchman and became the leading spokesperson in the desegregation of the Episcopal Church. His other publications (some through the presses operated by the Rev. George Freeman Bragg) included articles on the "Doctrine of Intention" (1905) and many devotional books, including Devotions of the Cross and at the Holy Mass, My Companion, A Bird’s Eye View of Exegetical Studies, The Writings of Saints Paul and James, The Holy Sacrament of the Altar and Penance, and The Manual of the Guild of One More Soul.

== Death and legacy ==
Demby retired in 1938, but continued to serve individual parishes in Kansas, Pittsburgh and Cleveland. He died in Cleveland in 1957, as did his wife Antoinette. He had lived to see the U.S. Supreme Court's desegregation decision in Brown v. Board of Education and its support in Arkansas by Episcopal bishop R. Bland Mitchell, who had also reversed years of declining membership in the diocese. He was eulogized as someone who could eradicate racism by sheer good example, if that were possible. Both Demby and his wife Antoinette Demby are interred at Lake View Cemetery in Cleveland.

In 1953, Demby donated some papers to the James Weldon Johnson Center at Yale University. Other papers, and those of his wife, are now held in the New York Public Library's Schomberg Center for Research into Black Culture. St. Edmund's Church in Chicago, Illinois has a stained glass window honoring this modern servant of God.

== Sources ==
- Michael J. Beary, Black Bishop: Edward T. Demby and the Struggle for Racial Equality in the Episcopal Church (Urbana, Ill.: University of Illinois Press, 2001) ISBN 9780252026188
- Harold Lewis, Yet with A Steady Beat: The African American Struggle for Recognition in the Episcopal Church (Valley Forge: Trinity Press International 1996) ISBN 9781563381300
- Gardiner H. Shattuck, Episcopalians and Race: Civil War to Civil Rights (Lexington: The University Press of Kentucky, 2000, 2003) ISBN 9780813190648
