= Jenny Eakin Delony =

American painter

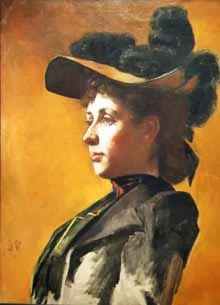
- Self portrait
- Born: May 13, 1866; Washington, Arkansas
- Died: April 1, 1949 (aged 82); Little Rock, Arkansas
- Resting place: Oakland Cemetery, Little Rock, Arkansas; 34°43′38.26″N 92°15′40.65″W
- Education: Art Academy of Cincinnati; Académie Julian; Académie Delécluse; Atelier of Paul-Louis Delance; St. Louis School of Fine Arts; and more
- Spouses: Nathaniel J. Rice; (1891-1893, his death); Paul A. Meyrowitz; (1910-1920s, their separation)

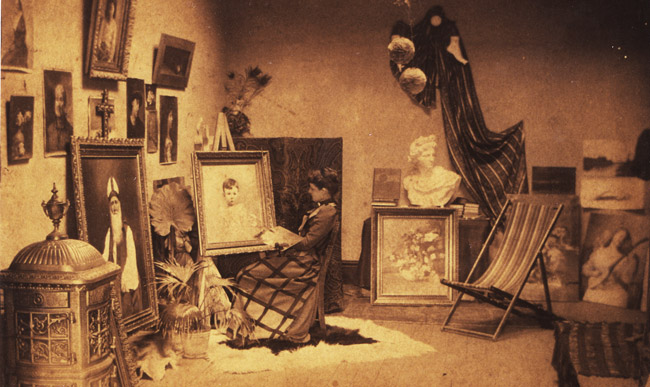
Jenny Eakin Delony at her Little Rock, Arkansas studio, April 1891

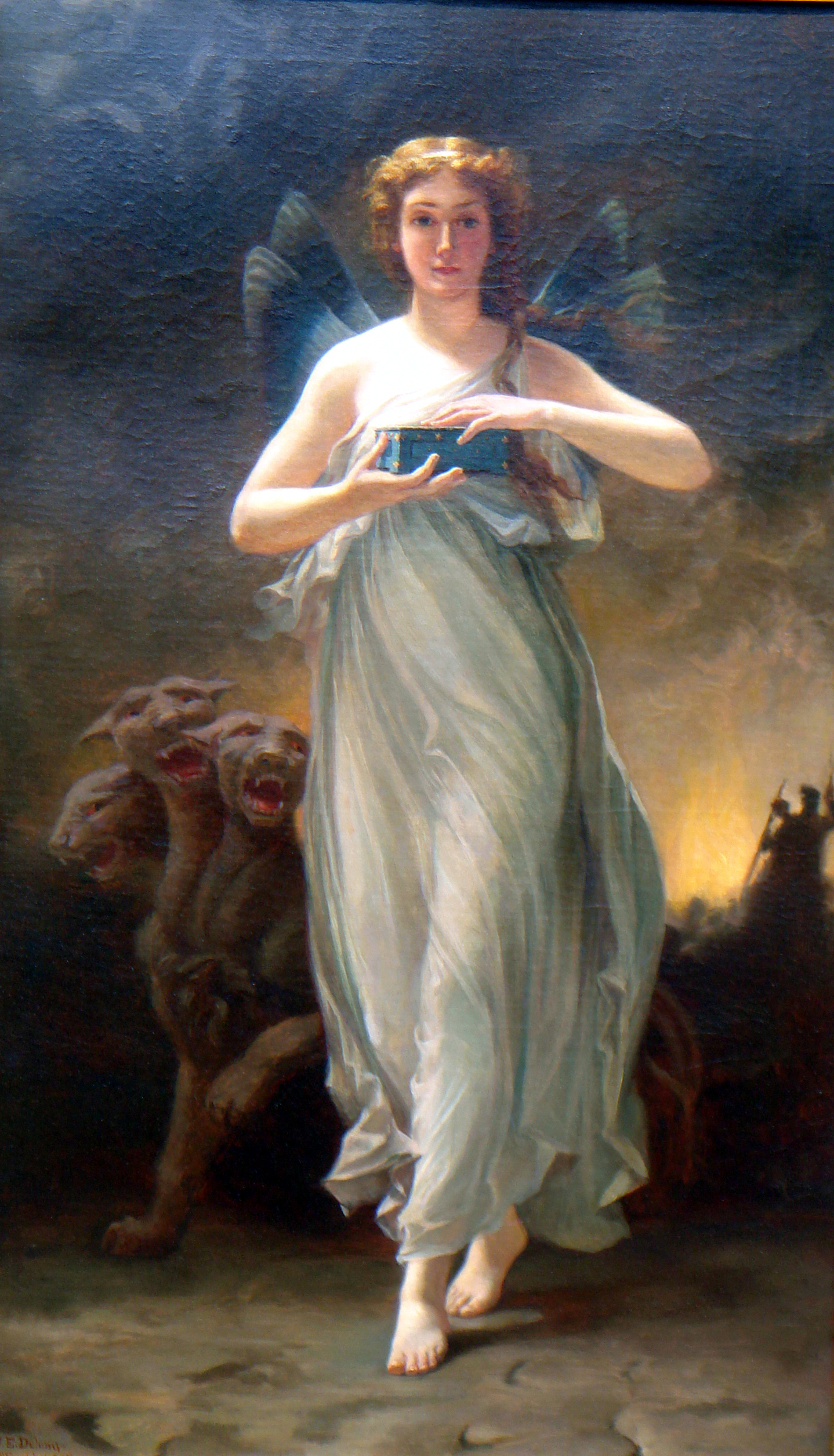
Jenny Eakin Delony, Psyche, after Alfred de Curzon

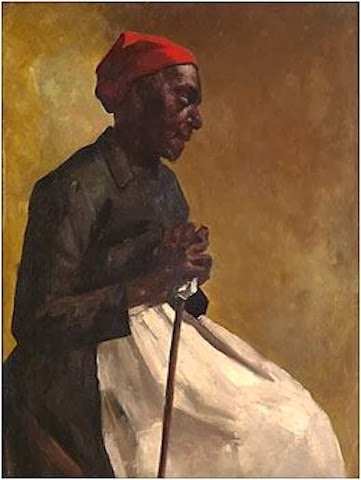
Jenny Eakin Delony, Arkansas Made, 1896–1900

Jenny Eakin Delony, also known as Jenny Eakin Delony Rice and Jenny Meyrowitz, (1866–1949) was an American painter and educator. She specialized in portraits of notable and historic figures in the United States, but also made miniature, landscape, wildlife, still life, and genre paintings. She was the founder of collegiate art education in Arkansas.

== Early life and education ==
Delony was born in Washington, Arkansas, on May 13, 1866, to Alchyny Turner Delony, a lawyer, and Elizabeth Pearson Delony.

She received a gold medal in music and art when she studied at the Wesleyan Female Institution in Staunton, Virginia. Delony began her professional study at Art Academy of Cincinnati from 1886 to 1888. At least two years followed in Paris, where Delony studied at the Académie Julian, the Académie Delécluse, and in the atelier of painter Paul-Louis Delance.

She later studied at the St. Louis School of Fine Arts from 1892 to 1893, then in Venice sometime prior to 1895 with Italian painter Stefano Novo. Delony entered the École des Beaux-Arts in Paris in 1896, which was the first year women were admitted there. The same year she would be among the first women to study artistic anatomy at the École de Médecine in Paris. She also studied at some time under the American painter William Merritt Chase and was his personal secretary at Shinnecock, a summer school Chase ran on Southampton on Long Island from 1891 to 1902.

== Career ==
Jenny Eakin Delony was one of the first woman artist from Arkansas to gain a reputation as a successful painter in the United States and internationally. She was a member of the American Artists Professional League, Association of Women Painters and Sculptors and the National Arts Club, both in New York. Delony became one of the first women members and one of the first women to exhibit at the National Academy of Design. Her works were exhibited at Philadelphia, Boston and New York miniature painters societies, the Woman's Art Club of New York, National Academy of Design, and the New York Water Color Club.

=== Early career ===
Delony set up her first professional art studios in Little Rock, and during the 1880s and 1890s she painted portraits of many distinguished citizens. She represented the state regionally and nationally at various exhibitions: the World Cotton Centennial Exposition in New Orleans (1884), the State Exposition in Little Rock (1887), World's Columbian Exposition in Chicago (1893), and the Cotton States and International Exposition in Atlanta (1895). She won premiums for many works exhibited.

=== Educator ===
Delony taught art in Virginia for three years, first at Virginia Female Institute in Roanoke (1893–1894), then Norfolk College for Young Ladies in Norfolk (1894–1896). From 1897 through 1899, she was the first Director of Art for Arkansas Industrial University, which became during her tenure the University of Arkansas (UA) in Fayetteville.

=== New York ===
Interested in feminist activism and the suffrage movement, Rice left Fayetteville to set up a studio in New York in 1900. In 1903, she exhibited at the National Academy of Arts. Her miniature of Queen Victoria was exhibited at Tiffany's.

In her role as suffragette and artist, she was chosen to represent American women as an exhibitor at the International Council of Women in Berlin, Germany, which convened in 1904 from June 6 to 18. In 1905, her portrait of the "richest woman in America", Hetty Green, was featured as a full page in the New York Times, granting the artist instant celebrity; the portrait is now in the collection of the Historic Arkansas Museum in Little Rock.

=== Later years ===
By 1935 the artist retired from the New York art scene and returned to Little Rock. She lived in her parents' former home with her sister Daisy.

She is buried at Oakland & Fraternal Historic Cemetery Park in Little Rock.

== Personal life ==
Delony married Nathaniel J. Rice of Denver, Colorado, on December 10, 1891, he died in 1893.

Her second marriage was to Paul A. Meyrowitz, on November 19, 1910 in Chicago, Illinois.

She was a member of the United Daughters of the Confederacy and Daughters of the American Revolution.

== Works and collections ==
Many examples of Rice's work can be viewed today in public collections, including the following portraits:

- A Southern Gentleman portrait at Historic Washington State Park
- An African American and many other works are at the Historic Arkansas Museum
- Confederate president Jefferson Davis at the Arkansas State Capital this portrait is now at the Arkansas State Archives ASA Artifact 71.604
- Mrs. Jefferson Davis (Varina Davis) for the Museum of the Confederacy, Richmond, Virginia
- Governor George Washington Donaghey, Logan H. Roots, J. T. W. Tillar, are at the Arkansas History Commission
- Governor Thomas Chipman McRae is located on the North Wing, first floor of the Arkansas State Capitol
- Bishop Henry Niles Pierce is in the office of the Diocese of Arkansas at Trinity Episcopal Church in Little Rock
- George G. Williams, New York Clearing House and Chemical National Bank

She also made portraits of Hetty Green, Bishop Henry Niles Pierce, William Sherer, Dr. George Taylor Stewart, and Spencer Trask. Her painting of the 'La Grange College of Alabama is at the Museum of Tennessee Valley Historic Society, Tuscumbia, Alabama

Her work was shown with Maud Hold, Josephine Graham and Elsie Freund in 2007 at the "Women Artists in Arkansas" exhibition at the Historic Arkansas Museum.
