= James Winchester =

James Winchester may refer to:

- James Winchester (general) (1752–1826), an American Revolutionary War officer and brigadier general during the War of 1812
- James Winchester (Maryland judge) (1772–1806), Maryland politician and judge
- James R. Winchester (born 1952), Justice of the Oklahoma Supreme Court
- Jesse Winchester (1944–2014), stage name of James Ridout Winchester, American musician
- James Winchester (American football) (born 1989), American football player
- James Ridout Winchester (1852–1941), bishop of the Episcopal Diocese of Arkansas
