= Denby (disambiguation) =

Denby is a village in Derbyshire, England.

Denby may also refer to:

== Places and organizations ==
- Denby, South Dakota, an unincorporated community
- Denby High School, a school in Detroit, Michigan, U.S.
- Denby Pottery Company, a manufacturer in Denby, England
- Denby Transport, a haulage company based in Lincoln, England
- Denby House, a historic raised cottage in Mobile, Alabama, U.S.
- Denby Dale, a parish in the borough of Kirklees, West Yorkshire, England
  - Upper Denby, a village in the parish of Denby Dale
  - Lower Denby, a village in the parish of Denby Dale

== Other uses ==
- Denby (surname)
- Denby, a forename, as in Denby Browning
- DENBY, hymn tune composed in 1904 by Charles J. Dale

== See also ==
- Denby Bottles, an area of settlement in Denby, Derbyshire, England
- Daniela Denby-Ashe (born 1980), English actress
- Demby, a surname
- Denbigh
  - Denbigh (disambiguation)
