= Jacob Semiatin =

American abstract expressionist painter (1915–2003)

Jacob Moses Semiatin (1915–2003) was an American landscape and abstract expressionist painter. His works from the 1930s and 1940s were watercolors of countryside and industrial settings; his later works were abstract. He painted with acrylics and oils. His work and home life centered around New York City.

== Personal life ==
Jacob Semiatin was born on April 10, 1915, to Polish-Jewish parents Herman Semiatin (Semiatitzki) and Sarah Moidovnik in the Portobello region of Dublin, Ireland. He emigrated to America in 1920 aboard the Kaiserin Auguste Victoria, landing at Ellis Island. Both Jacob and his brother Lionel were artistic; Jacob was a visual artist and Lionel a musician and an award-winning composer.

Semiatin married Ludmila Rosanfeld in 1954. He lived in Manhattan from 1993 until his death. Semiatin died in New York City on August 28, 2003.

== Career ==
Semiatin's watercolors of the 1930s and 1940s depict scenes of urban and industrial life, as well as bucolic landscapes. John I. H. Baur, Curator of Painting at the Brooklyn Museum, encouraged Semiatin to exhibit his paintings in group shows at the museum, which he did on several occasions. Semiatin also became a member of the Brooklyn Society of Artists.

During World War II, Semiatin was a private in the U.S. Army at Camp Upton in Yaphank, New York. While stationed in Arkansas, Semiatin painted many rural landscapes in the Blytheville and Amorel areas.

Upon his return to New York City after the war, Semiatin began to paint landscapes and portraits in a more abstract style. These paintings were exhibited at Contemporary Arts Gallery from the end of December 1957 to the first part of January 1958. Jacob Semiatin's landscape painting technique was described in The Art Digest: "Vigorous jottings of the brush activate watercolors which aim at landscape abbreviations." John Ashbery of Art News wrote that "Semiatin shows brisk, cheerful abstract watercolors in which a few strokes of blue and green suffice to give the feeling of a landscape."

In the late 1950s, Semiatin immersed himself in the art movement of abstract expressionism. His paintings became completely abstract. Semiatin's one-man show of abstract watercolors at Galerie Internationale was reviewed by Stuart Preston of The New York Times in 1962, who wrote: "Liveliness is all, but a word must be said both for ingratiating color and a knowing way with the medium." According to his obituary in The New York Times, "his works hang in museums and private collections around the world." For instance, the watercolor Street Scene in Blytheville (1942) is among the collection of the Historic Arkansas Museum in Little Rock, Arkansas.

== Collections ==
- Historic Arkansas Museum, Little Rock, Arkansas

== Exhibitions ==
- January 22 – February 7, 1943 – The 27th Annual Exhibition of the Brooklyn Society of Artists, Brooklyn Museum, Brooklyn, New York
- April 29 to May 13, 1945 – Army Arts Exhibition: Eighth Service Command, Dallas Museum of Fine Arts, Dallas, Texas
- February 1948 – The 32nd Annual Exhibition of the Brooklyn Society of Artists, Brooklyn Museum, Brooklyn, New York City, New York
- September 1952 – Open Watercolor Show, Village Art Center, Greenwich Village, New York
- December 27 to January 10, 1957/58 – Jacob Semiatin, solo exhibition, Contemporary Arts Gallery, New York City, New York.
- April 1–14, 1962 – Jacob Semiatin, solo exhibition, Galerie Internationale, New York City, New York
- February 1 to 15, 1964 – Jacob Semiatin, solo exhibition, Galerie Internationale, New York City, New York.
- October 15 to November 5, 1977 – Landscapes: Painters and Sculptors, Glass Galerie, New York City, New York
- May 30, 2013, Jacob Semiatin, Alzueta Gallery, Barcelona, Spain
- May 2 to May 31, 2013 – Jacob Semiatin: Watercolors 1950-1962, Serge Castella Gallery, New York Design Center, New York City, New York
- September 8, 2017 to January 8, 2018 – Hidden Treasures: Selected Gala Fund Purchases, Historic Arkansas Museum, Little Rock, Arkansas
- 2021 – The Estate Collection, Rubine Red Gallery, Palm Springs, California
- 2022 – The Estate Collection, Rubine Red Gallery, Palm Springs, California
