= Demby =

Demby is a surname. Notable people with the surname include:

- Albert Joe Demby (1934-2021), Sierra Leonean politician and Vice President
- Constance Demby (1939–2021), US musician, composer, artist
- Edward Thomas Demby (1869–1957), US author and religious figure
- Jack Demby (1888–1963), one of the names used by Austrian football athlete
- Jamil Demby (born 1996), American football player
- William Demby (1922–2013), American writer

== See also ==
- Denby (disambiguation)
