= Robert R. Brown =

Robert R. Brown may refer to:

- R. R. Brown (1879–1950), American football player, coach and college athletics administrator
- Robert R. Brown (bishop) (1910–1994), author and Episcopal bishop of Arkansas
