= The Anglican Digest =

Coordinates: 36°22′5″N 93°45′58″W

- Editor: Frederick A. Robinson
- Categories: Religious magazine
- Frequency: Quarterly
- Circulation: 40,000 (2024)
- Publisher: Hillspeak
- Founder: Howard Lane Foland
- Founded: 1958
- Company: SPEAK
- Country: United States
- Based in: Eureka Springs, Arkansas
- Language: English
- Website: http://anglicandigest.org/
- OCLC: 1589123

The Anglican Digest (sometimes called TAD) is a quarterly religious magazine in the United States providing information related to Anglicanism, including news, essays, book reviews, and devotional material. It is published by SPEAK, the Society for Promoting and Encouraging Arts and Knowledge (of the Church), which was founded as the Episcopal Book Club in 1953 by Howard Lane Foland, a priest of The Episcopal Church in Nevada, Missouri. Since 1960, it has been based on a former dairy farm in the Ozarks called Hillspeak near Eureka Springs, Arkansas.

The Anglican Digest affirms a "Prayer Book Catholic" heritage but says it serves "all expressions of Anglicanism: Anglo-Catholic, Broad, and Evangelical." When it began in 1958, it described itself as "A quarterly miscellany reflecting the words and work of the Churches of the Anglican Communion:

some things old
many things new
most things borrowed
everything true."

James B. Simpson became executive director after its founder retired in 1980. At that time, it reported a paid circulation of over 100,000 worldwide. By 1989, subscriptions had increased to almost 250,000 with six issues per year. However, in 2012 it reported 45,000 readers. As of 2022, TAD had not published a public statement of circulation in at least six years.

Edward L. Salmon, Jr. chaired the publication's board for 41 years. After his death, his daughter, Catherine S. Salmon, and Tony Clavier served as an editorial committee. In 2020, Fred Robinson became editor.
