= Herbert A. Donovan Jr. =

American Episcopal bishop (1931–2025)

The Right Reverend Herbert A. Donovan Jr.
- Bishop of Arkansas
- Church: Episcopal Church
- Diocese: Arkansas
- Elected: May 10, 1980
- In office: 1981–1993
- Predecessor: Christoph Keller Jr.
- Successor: Larry Maze
- Previous post: Coadjutor Bishop of Arkansas (1980-1981)

Orders
- Ordination: 1957 by James Wilson Hunter
- Consecration: September 22, 1980 by John Allin

Personal details
- Born: July 14, 1931 Washington, D.C., United States
- Died: November 2, 2025 (aged 94) Colorado, US
- Denomination: Anglican
- Parents: Herbert Alcorn Donovan, Marion Mitchell Kirk
- Spouse: Mary Gertrude Sudman (m. 1959)
- Children: 3
- Education: University of Virginia

Herbert Alcorn Donovan Jr. (July 14, 1931 – November 2, 2025) was an American Episcopal cleric and administrator who served as the bishop of Arkansas.

Donovan served in many high level posts in the American Episcopal Church, advocated for women and LGBTQ people and administered several Episcopal charities working in Africa, the Middle East, Europe and Cuba.

== Background ==
Donovan was born in Washington, D.C., on July 14, 1931. His parents were the Rev. Herbert A. Donovan and Marion Kirk Donovan who had been missionaries to Liberia but his father was then rector of Truro Church, in Fairfax, Virginia.

Donovan attended Episcopal High School in Alexandria, Virginia, and the University of Virginia. While at the university he served as president of the U.S. Student Christian Movement. In 1953, Donovan attended the third World Conference of Christian Youth in Kerala State in, India. In 1955, he joined the U.S. Navy as a chaplain in 1955, serving later as a reserve chaplain until the 1970s. As a captain, he commanded a chaplains unit that ministered to the US fleet of nuclear submarines.

In 1957, Donovan graduated from Virginia Theological Seminary and was ordained deacon by Bishop Frederick D. Goodwin of Virginia. Donovan then moved to Green River, Wyoming, was ordained priest by Bishop J. Wilson Hunter of Wyoming and served as rector of St. John's Episcopal Church.

In 1959, Donovan married Mary Sudman; the couple had three children, all born in Basin, Wyoming, while he served at St. Andrew's Episcopal Church.

== Later career ==
In 1964, Donovan became executive officer to Bishop C. Gresham Marmion of the Diocese of Kentucky. In 1970, Donovan moved to Montclair, New Jersey, where he became rector of St. Luke's Episcopal Church.

In 1980, Donovan was elected Bishop of Arkansas, moving to Little Rock. In 1981, Donovan joined other religious leaders as plaintiffs in McLean v. Arkansas Board of Education, a successful suit that challenged the regulation that required Arkansas public schools to teach “creation science”. Donovan retired as Bishop on September 1, 1993.

Donovan then became vicar of Trinity Church, Wall Street and Assisting Bishop of New York. After his retirement from that position in 1998, he served in several interim positions: Provisional Bishop of Chicago 1998–99 (January 1998 until March 1999), Assisting Bishop of New Jersey 1999–2000 (May 26, 1999 – February 1, 2000), Anglican Observer at the United Nations, 2000–2001, and Rector of Trinity Church, Boston March from 2005 to May 2006. Herbert died on November 2, 2025, aged 94.

== Career focus ==
Active in church governance, Donovan attended every General Convention from 1967 until 2012, either as a clerical deputy or later as a member of the House of Bishops (where he served as Secretary from 1986 to 1998). His career spanned a turbulent period as the Episcopal Church dealt with the struggles to admit women and later gay and lesbian candidates to Holy Orders.

Donovan's impulse was to work through existing political orders to effect change. He and Byron Rushing of Massachusetts chaired Coalition E for the General Convention of 1976 and 1979—a political action group that worked to eliminate gender, racial and ethnic barriers to the ordination and church deployment processes. He also chaired the National Council's Committee on the Employment/Deployment of Women Priests for the Episcopal Church.

== International concerns ==
Donovan represented the Episcopal Church in delegations to Latin America and several provinces in Africa. In 1999, he became Coordinator of the College of Bishops at General Theological Seminary. He served as Interim Anglican Observer to the United Nations from December 7, 1999, until July 1, 2001.

In October 2001, Donovan was appointed Executive Director of the Compass Rose Society, an international group dedicated to raising funds for Anglican mission initiative. These included an Anglican hospital in the Gaza Strip, health clinics in Nigeria, rebuilding church offices in Cuba and completing the construction of an Anglican Centre in Spain. As President of the American Friends of Cuttington University in Liberia, Donovan was active in raising support for that University's campaign to combat the ebola crisis in 2004.

Donovan also served as Deputy to the Presiding Bishop for Anglican Communion Relations from 2008 to 2010. He was a member of the Executive Council of the Episcopal Church from 1979 to 1980, and 1985–1991. He also served on the Pastoral Care Team of the House of Bishops to minister to chaplains serving in the U.S. armed forces in Operation Desert Storm.
