= Larry Maze =

American cleric (born 1943)

The Right Reverend Larry Maze
- Bishop of Arkansas
- Church: Episcopal Church
- Diocese: Arkansas
- Elected: November 13, 1993
- In office: 1994–2006
- Predecessor: Herbert A. Donovan Jr.
- Successor: Larry R. Benfield

Orders
- Ordination: January 17, 1973 by Jackson Earle Gilliam
- Consecration: June 11, 1994 by Edmond L. Browning

Personal details
- Born: September 13, 1943 (age 82) Havre, Montana, United States
- Denomination: Anglican
- Parents: Archie William Maze, Goldie Louella Pasma
- Spouse: Marcia Kay Porter (m. 1964; div. 1973) Beth Daniels (m. 1981)
- Children: 4

Larry Earl Maze (born September 13, 1943) is an American cleric who was bishop of the Episcopal Diocese of Arkansas from 1994 to 2006.

== Early life and education ==
Maze was born on September 13, 1943, in Havre, Montana, the son Archie William Maze and Goldie Louella Pasma. He graduated with a Bachelor of Science degree from Northern Montana College in 1967, and a Master of Science degree from Montana State University in 1968. He enrolled in theological studies at the Seminary of the Southwest from where he earned a Master of Divinity degree in 1972. He was awarded an honorary Doctor of Divinity degree from the Seminary of the Southwest in 1994, and another from the University of the South in 1995.

== Ordained ministry ==
Maze was ordained to the diaconate on June 25, 1972, to the priesthood on January 17, 1973, by Bishop Jackson Earle Gilliam of Montana. He served as curate of the Church of the Holy Spirit in Missoula, Montana, between 1972 and 1974 before becoming chaplain and head of the Department of Religion at St Andrew's School in Jackson, Mississippi, a post he retained until 1978. In 1978, he became vicar of St James' Church in Port Gibson, Mississippi, while in 1981, he transferred to Jackson, Mississippi to serve as rector of All Saints' Church. Between 1988 and 1994, he was the rector of Nativity Church in Greenwood, Mississippi.

== Bishop ==
Maze was elected Bishop of Arkansas on November 13, 1993 during a special convention held in Trinity Cathedral. He was consecrated to the episcopate on June 11, 1994 by Presiding Bishop Edmond L. Browning, at the Robinson Center (Little Rock). He retired in 2006.
