= David Denby (academic) =

David Denby was an author and a senior lecturer in French at Dublin City University. He retired in 2010.

== Reception ==
Denby wrote Sentimental Narrative and the Social Order in France. The book was reviewed by Sean Quinlan in Eighteenth-Century Studies; he wrote that "Denby's analysis encompasses beautifully crafted readings of sentimental writers such as Baculard d'Arnaud, Jean-Claude Gorgy, François Vernes, Jean-Jacques Rousseau, idéologues Pierre Cabanis and Destutt de Tracy, and post-revolutionary thinkers such as Germaine de Staël." The work was also reviewed in Eighteenth-Century Fiction and in Modern Language Review.

== Published works ==
Books by Denby include:

- Sentimental Narrative and the Social Order in France, 1760–1820, Cambridge University Press, 1994.
- (joint translator of): Jacques Le Goff et Pierre Nora, Faire de l'histoire, Paris, 1974; Constructing the Past, Cambridge, Cambridge University Press
- (translator of) Alain Touraine et al., Solidarité, Paris, 1982: Solidarity, Cambridge, Cambridge University Press

Denby has also written a number of articles, conference proceedings, and book chapters.
