= James B. Simpson =

American Episcopal priest (1927-2002)

James B. Simpson (1927–2002) was a journalist, author and Episcopal priest, best known for writing several volumes of Simpson’s Contemporary Quotations, a set of books of quotations. His work continues to be a trusted and recognized favorite among journalists, scholars, academics and quote enthusiasts.

== Early life and journalism ==
Born the youngest son of an undertaker, Simpson was a native of Fort Smith, Arkansas. Simpson would joke that his love for quotes was perhaps genetic since his mother—who died when he was just an infant—would also highlight her favorite passages and clip articles from newspapers and magazines just like the hobby that her son developed.

His childhood hometown was also where he first began his journalism career. Once finished with high school, he wrote for the local newspaper, the Southwest American.

Subsequently, Simpson attended the Medill School of Journalism at Northwestern University near Chicago where he continued his study the subject. During this time, his love for quotes began to blossom. Simpson took a sociology course which provided the inspirational backdrop to collecting contemporary quotations as he has likened the art of archiving quotes to "a sociology project." When he was a senior in college, he even asked his parents for Bartlett's Familiar Quotations for Christmas one year.

Upon graduation from Northwestern in 1949, Simpson embarked on a career in journalism by writing for the Associated Press and United Press International. He spent his summers working in newsrooms in cities across the country such as Chicago and San Francisco before ultimately settling in New York. Besides his domestic travels, he also reported internationally from London, Lagos, Moscow, Tokyo, and Beijing.

In addition, Simpson had written for periodicals including Esquire, Town & Country, TV Guide, Reader’s Digest, and the New York Times Magazine. Later in life as a priest, he was also a correspondent for the British publications, The Living Church and Church Times, and authored several books on religion including Veil and Cowl: Writings from the World of Monks and Nuns, Regent of the Sea, The Long Shadows of Lambeth X, Stars in His Crown: Anglican Religious Orders, Discerning God's Will: Lambeth XI, Seasons of the Spirit, and A Treasury of Anglican Art.

Apart from his career as a journalist, Simpson was also a television network consultant, worked in the advertising world as an account executive and then had a stint in corporate public relations.

His interest in quotes stemmed from his journalistic experience and an introduction to early television. During the 15 years he spent in New York, one of his first jobs involved searching for the funny or unique sayings of upcoming guest stars on the early NBC talk show, "Who Said That?" His job was to clip quotations from the day’s paper for use on the program. It began when in 1951, Zsa Zsa Gabor, a star of the show, asked Simpson—who was working as a young radio journalist in New York City at the time—to collect some quotes that would be useful for that day’s program. Subsequently, other stars began utilizing Simpson as well. Finally, after learning of his assistance, the show’s producers asked him to take the lead on writing the show.

By the time the show was cancelled, Simpson had already compiled enough quotes to publish the first version of his quote compendiums in 1957 under the title Best Quotes of ’54, ’55, ’56.

== Priesthood and quote collection ==
Following the publication of Best Quotes, Simpson wrote a series of pieces on modern spiritual leaders for Look magazine. This project was followed by a biography he authored in 1962 on Michael Ramsey, the 100th Archbishop of Canterbury, which was listed among the 200 best books of that year. Through writing the book, Simpson—who had wanted to attend the seminary ever since college but ultimately resolved to move to New York—felt a higher calling and finally left his career as a journalist at 38 to enroll in the Nashotah House seminary to become an Episcopal priest. Nashotah House offers a rigorous core curriculum, including Hebrew and Greek, combined with an emphasis on the life of prayer and a demanding community life.

As the late librarian of Congress Daniel J. Boorstin put it, the experiences of his early life "finally inspired him to still another view of the immortal word, and he became an Episcopal priest." It was the second edition of his Contemporary Quotations anthology which provided him with the funds to enter the seminary in 1964.

After graduating and becoming ordained in 1967, he served as curate for Christ's Church in Rye, New York and as rector for Christ Church in Middletown, New Jersey and became an editor for The Anglican Digest and the director of the Episcopal Book Club.

Despite his duties and commitment to the priesthood, he retained a strong appreciation for journalism. A voracious reader, he turned his analytical eye to the words of others, always looking out for an interesting, meaningful, or unique phrase.

In his search for quotes, he would read eight daily newspapers, seven weekly magazines, and a dozen monthlies. In any given day, he would usually find about eight or ten quotes of interest that he would choose to save.

On choosing the most notable quotations, he would highlight his favorite sayings and then let them sit for a week or two before taking another look. Upon a second examination, if he still felt they were worthy of posterity, he would then catalog the story from which the quote was taken by clipping the article from the publication and storing it in a binder as well as noting its source, date and context in his computer.

In addition, he thoroughly scrutinized every quote even more before adding it to the published editions of his books. Specifically, Simpson wanted to avoid the inclusion of a quote that would lose its significance in the future, so he was fond of saying that he would let quotes "marinate in time" for six months to a year to judge their lasting quality, saying that, "There’s a certain news judgment involved to know a good quote. You have to ask if it is said originally and whether it will still be valued in 10 to 15 years. I won’t put any quote in immediately. I have to wait to see if it holds up to the test of time."

He took his quotes, according to a 1997 article in The Christian Science Monitor, from not only newspapers but weekly and monthly magazines and the transcripts of 60 Minutes, 20/20, Dateline NBC, Primetime, and Sunday morning talk show broadcasts. In fact, at home he would even place a tape recorder near his television so that he was always at the ready to capture notable words.

Simpson later moved to Washington, D.C. in 1988 in order to facilitate his quotation collecting and research. Nevertheless, he still remained equally committed to his priestly duties by heading the congregation at the Church of Ascension and Saint Agnes as well as serving the parishes of All Souls Church and St. Paul’s Episcopal Church on K Street and providing ecumenical services as a chaplain for The Georgetown, a retirement residence. In fact, Simpson felt that his work as a priest and his penchant for collecting quotations were symbiotically intertwined in saying that, "It helps make my sermons more interesting. It helps me be aware of trends in medicine and lifestyles. It helps me be involved in the world, so I’m not just a priest."

Of the most notable quotes he had compiled in his career, Simpson’s personal favorites included one by the novelist, Graham Greene: "When a train pulls into a great city, I am reminded of the closing moments of an overture" one from the Bible, Ecclesiasticus 39: "He that giveth his mind … will keep the sayings of the renowned, and where subtle parables are, he will be there also. He will seek the secrets of grave sentences and be conversant in dark parables" and one by Albert Camus: "In the depth of winter I finally learned that within me lay an invincible summer."

== Contemporary Quotations ==
For more than 40 years, the Rev. James B. Simpson saw as his mission the documentation of the words of leaders, thinkers, journalists, social activists, artists, and pundits. He fulfilled that mission with great success, becoming the author of Simpson’s Contemporary Quotations, a book series of multiple editions which contain a collection of the best quotations of the modern era, particularly of the past fifty years.

Simpson wrote that Contemporary Quotations picks up after James Bartlett's Familiar Quotations (first published in 1855) in that seeks to capture the important quotes of our time as, or before, they become classics. He chose quotes for his book based on their uniqueness, for how they stood out within a context, and the likeliness that they would have lasting power.

One of the most important elements of his quotes, he wrote, was that they were accessible to his readers. This, he felt, was something that made Simpson's Contemporary Quotations unique. He also found the historical and societal context of quotes important.

While other authors in this genre wrote books to locate the precise form of the quotes of the ancients and the literary classics, Simpson, with his journalist’s sensibility, had another plan. His idea was to tell use quotations to tell what contemporaries were saying as they said it. He wanted to portray their words in the pure, stark readable language of the day so that readers could properly assess, not only the words, but perhaps the character behind them.

At a time when words are often lost amid modern-day images and spin, Simpson sought to help make sense of the world by creating Contemporary Quotations as a means of holding them safely in time for closer examination.

Simpson’s Contemporary Quotations is a series of books compiled and edited by Simpson beginning in 1957, followed up by subsequent publications in 1964 and 1988 and finally with the last edition being published by HarperCollins in 1997. The following titles are among the various editions in the series, including: Best Quotes, Simpson’s Contemporary Quotations: The Most Notable Quotes, 1950-1988 and Simpson’s Contemporary Quotations: The Most Notable Quotes From 1950 to the Present.

Simpson had many friends in the literary, journalistic, and religious worlds, and he got fan mail from around the world for his books of quotations.

He was listed in "Who's Who in America" in the 1990s.

== Hobbies ==
Aside from his collection of over 200 books on quotations, Simpson had a passion for other items. He was an avid collector of old-fashioned "mustache cups", miniature busts of famous individuals who he felt were the best speakers of the time and was a self-proclaimed "amateur collector" of Biedermeier furniture—a form of German furniture for the "common man." While living in Washington, Fr. Simpson also became a member of the Cosmos Club.

== Death and legacy ==
Near the end of Simpson’s life, he offered his will and estate, to his alma mater, Northwestern University, which turned it down. Subsequently, he made the same offer to American University located in Washington, D.C. in 1997. As a resident of Cathedral Heights, he noted that choosing American for the gift seemed natural since the university was located in his neighborhood and he had always felt welcome in its academic community through his interactions with faculty members, visits to the library, and guest lectures on the importance of quotes in journalism.

The bequest included $350,000 to fund the continuation of his mission for quotation collection as well as the valuable copyright to Father Simpson’s personal collection of quotes-more than 22,000 from the second half of the 20th century-and a collection of busts of famous quote-makers.

In accordance with Simpson’s will, at his death in March 2002, American University now hosts the Simpson Room on the fourth floor of the School of Communication. It also serves as the headquarters for the Simpson Fellowship, awarded each year by the School of Communication.

== Simpson’s own quotations ==
- "Quote collecting helps me live out fully that American need to get the most out of every minute. It’s my small contribution to world history." – Rev. James B. Simpson
- "A good quote conveys the originality, depth and creativeness of the speaker in a way that makes you want to write it down and quote it yourself to the next person you see." – Rev. James B. Simpson
- "It’s been a joyful march through almost five decades in a wild, abandoned romance with the words of others." – Rev. James B. Simpson
- "When someone is in the news, what he or she says is the most newsworthy thing about them. This work consumes my whole life." – Rev. James B. Simpson
- "Our era boasts eloquent spokesmen from every level of society, and…their words should not be buried in the formidable and sometimes inaccessible files of newspapers and magazines." – Rev. James B. Simpson
- "It’s in memorable, non-cliché language. Verbs are preferable, and it sums up the whole event in one quote. It will still be valuable and interesting 10 or 20 years from now. It stands on its own without explanation." – Rev. James B. Simpson, on what makes a good quote.
- "This is my own, small contribution to the history our times, to tell the history of our times in the language of our times." – Rev. James B. Simpson
- "It’s a good quotation if it has an appealing, even glib, (quality of) freshness and originality to it. It immediately captures your attention and makes you want to quote it to the next person you see. I think the quote should always have succinctness and insight, and says something you yourself have been trying to articulate. A good quotation may have an insightful quality that commends it to the ages. And sometimes, a good quotation will have a good twist to it and says it like it hasn’t been said before." – Rev. James B. Simpson
