= R. Bland Mitchell =

American Episcopal bishop

The Right Reverend Richard Bland Mitchell D.D.
- Bishop of Arkansas
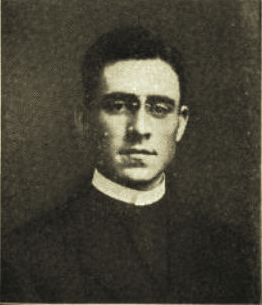
- Church: Episcopal Church
- Diocese: Arkansas
- Elected: 1938
- In office: 1938–1956
- Predecessor: Edwin Warren Saphore
- Successor: Robert R. Brown

Orders
- Ordination: June 24, 1913 by Theodore DuBose Bratton
- Consecration: October 5, 1938 by Walter Mitchell

Personal details
- Born: September 17, 1887 Rolla, Missouri, United States
- Died: March 7, 1961 (aged 73) Sewanee, Tennessee, United States
- Buried: University of the South Cemetery
- Denomination: Anglican
- Parents: Ewing Young Mitchell & Amanda Corinne Medley
- Spouse: Vivien McQuiston (m. 1915)
- Children: 2
- Education: University of the South

Richard Bland Mitchell (July 26, 1887 - March 7, 1961) was the eighth bishop of Arkansas in The Episcopal Church and the thirteenth chancellor of Sewanee: The University of the South. An Episcopal camp and retreat center in central Arkansas is named for him.

== Early life and education ==
Mitchell was born in Rolla, Missouri on July 26, 1887, the son of Ewing Young Mitchell and Amanda Corinne Medley. His brother was Walter Mitchell, who served as Bishop of Arizona. He was educated at the Rolla public schools and then the Sewanee Grammar School in Sewanee, Tennessee between 1901 and 1904. He then studied at the University of the South from where he graduated with a Bachelor of Arts in 1908, and a Bachelor of Divinity in 1912. He was awarded a Doctor of Divinity from the same university in 1931. He married Vivien McQuiston in 1915 and together had two children.

== Ordained ministry ==
Mitchell was ordained deacon on June 12, 1912, at St Luke's Chapel in Sewanee, Tennessee, and priest on June 24, 1913, in the Church of the Incarnation in West Point, Mississippi, on both occasions by Bishop Theodore DuBose Bratton of Mississippi. Between 1912 and 1915, he served as associate rector of St John's Church in Aberdeen, Mississippi, the Church of the Incarnation in West Point, Mississippi, Ascension Church in Brooksville, Mississippi, the Church of the Resurrection in Starkville, Mississippi, Grace Church in Okolona, Mississippi, and Nativity Church in Macon, Mississippi. Between 1915 and 1928, he held a number of positions in the administration of the Episcopal Church, including overseeing missions in Asia and Hawaii, national fundraising campaigns, and secretary to the national council. In 1929, Mitchell became rector of St Mary's-on-the-Highlands Church in Birmingham, Alabama, where he remained until 1938.

== Bishop ==
Mitchell was elected Bishop of Arkansas in 1938 and was consecrated on October 5, 1938, in Trinity Cathedral by his brother Walter Mitchell. His episcopacy is characterized with an increased financial stability, members, missions, and parishes. He also served as chancellor of the University of the South and chairman of its board of trustees from 1950 to 1956. Mitchell retired from Arkansas on October 5, 1956. He died on March 7, 1961, in Sewanee, Tennessee.
