= Charles Denby =

Charles Denby may refer to

- Charles Harvey Denby (1830–1904), U.S. Civil War officer, diplomat in China
- Charles Denby Jr. (1861–1938), U.S. diplomat, scholar of Chinese culture
