= George W. Freeman =

The Right Reverend George Washington Freeman D.D.
- Missionary Bishop of Arkansas
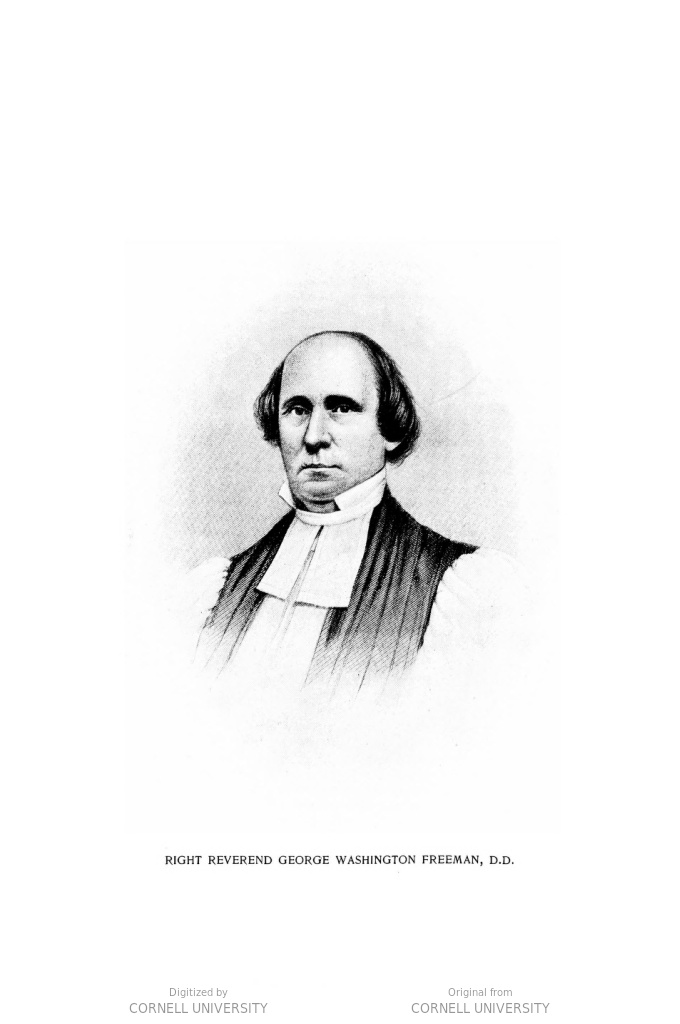
- Church: Episcopal Church
- Diocese: Arkansas
- In office: 1844–1858
- Predecessor: James Hervey Otey
- Successor: Henry C. Lay

Orders
- Ordination: May 20, 1827 by John Stark Ravenscroft
- Consecration: October 26, 1844 by Philander Chase

Personal details
- Born: June 13, 1789 Sandwich, Massachusetts, United States
- Died: April 29, 1858 (aged 68) Little Rock, Arkansas, United States
- Buried: Mount Holly Cemetery
- Denomination: Anglican
- Parents: Nathaniel Freeman & Tryphosa Colton
- Spouse: Anne Yates (m. 1818; died 1855)
- Children: 2

George Washington Freeman (June 13, 1789 – April 29, 1858) was the second Episcopal bishop of Arkansas and Provisional Bishop of Texas.

== Biography ==
Freeman was born of a Congregationalist family in Sandwich, Massachusetts. He did not initially intend a career in the clergy, but he afterward went to North Carolina and studied for the ministry of the Episcopal Church. Freeman was ordained deacon in Christ Church, Raleigh, North Carolina, by Bishop John Stark Ravenscroft in 1826, and was ordained priest in New Bern, North Carolina the following year by the same bishop. Freeman married and later had a son, Andrew, who also became an Episcopal priest.

In 1818, he married Anne Yates the granddaughter of Rev. William Yates, the College of William & Mary's fifth president (1761–1764) and is the namesake for Yates Hall on the college's campus; and a descendant of William Randolph, a colonist and land owner who played an important role in the history and government of the Commonwealth of Virginia. He and his wife, Mary Isham, are referred to as the "Adam and Eve" of Virginia. She had married as her first husband, Thomas Gholson, Jr., an American lawyer and politician. He represented Virginia from 1808 to 1816 in the United States House of Representatives from both Virginia's 18th congressional district and Virginia's 17th congressional district both now obsolete congressional districts. He was a member of the Virginia House of Delegates from 1806 to 1809.

For two years he served as missionary in the diocese of North Carolina. In 1829, Freeman was elected rector of Christ Church, Raleigh, and served in that office until 1840. In 1840, Freeman removed to Columbia, Tennessee, and from there, a year later, to Swedesboro, New Jersey. After a short stay in Swedesboro, he accepted a call to become rector of Immanuel Church, New Castle, Delaware. He was soon afterward elected missionary bishop of Arkansas and the Indian Territory, and was consecrated in St. Peter's Church, Philadelphia, October 26, 1844. Freeman was the 46th bishop in the ECUSA, and was consecrated by Bishops Philander Chase, Jackson Kemper, and Leonidas Polk. He received the degree of D.D. from the University of North Carolina in 1839. Freeman died in Little Rock, Arkansas, April 29, 1858.
