= William Montgomery Brown =

American bishop of the Episcopal and Old Catholic Churches

The Right Reverend William Montgomery Brown
- Bishop of Arkansas
- Church: Old Catholic Church (prev. Episcopal Church)
- Diocese: Arkansas
- In office: 1899–1912
- Predecessor: Henry Niles Pierce
- Successor: James Ridout Winchester
- Previous post: Coadjutor Bishop of Arkansas (1898-1899)

Orders
- Ordination: May 22, 1884 by Gregory T. Bedell
- Consecration: June 24, 1898 / June 24, 1925 by William Edward McLaren / William H. F. Brothers

Personal details
- Born: September 4, 1855 Orrville, Ohio, United States
- Died: October 31, 1937 (aged 82) Galion, Ohio, United States
- Buried: Fairview Cemetery, Galion, Ohio
- Parents: Joseph Morrison Brown & Lucina Elzina Cary
- Spouse: Ella Bradford (m. 1885)

William Montgomery Brown (September 4, 1855 – October 31, 1937), sometimes called "Bad Bishop" Brown, was an Episcopal clergyman and author. Brown, of Galion, Ohio, was consecrated a bishop of the Episcopal Church, but is best remembered as the first Episcopal bishop to be tried for heresy since the Reformation, and the first of any creed in America to be deposed for heretical teachings. He later became a bishop in an Independent Old Catholic body.

== Biography ==
William Montgomery Brown was born on September 4, 1855, on a farm west of Orrville, Ohio, the son of a Joseph Morrison and Lucina Elzina Cary Brown. His father was a tenant farmer who moved the family to Michigan in 1858, and later enlisted in the Union Army during the Civil War. Joseph Brown served in Tennessee before becoming ill, and was sent home to recuperate. He died on August 1, 1862. His mother moved the family back to Ohio, and "Willy" was "hired out" to a farmer who did not treat the boy well and neglected to provide for his education.

When Willy was 15, the county placed him with a farmer named Jacob Gardner, a member of the Methodist Episcopal Church. Gardner's piety greatly influenced young Brown. During this time he became seriously ill with typhoid fever. Years later Brown recalled making a bargain with God to devote his life to the ministry if his life would be spared. His health improved and he saved enough from the money his foster parents paid him to leave Ohio just after his 21st birthday. In 1876, Brown traveled to Omaha, Nebraska and got a job driving a carriage for a judge, who arranged for Brown to enter public school. After graduating, Brown returned to Ohio and worked in a tannery.

Philanthropist Mary Scranton Bradford agreed to underwrite his education at the Episcopal Seminary, Bexley Hall, at Kenyon College in Gambier, Ohio. Mrs. Bradford sent him to Seabury Divinity School in Minnesota from 1879 to 1880 so he could prepare for the seminary course. He finished his studies in 1883, but because he did not take all of his courses at Kenyon, he never received a Bachelor of Divinity degree from Bexley. Brown was ordained and in 1883, became vicar of Grace Church in Galion, Ohio. In 1891, he became the archdeacon for missionary work in the Diocese of Ohio and wrote his popular The Church for Americans, which explained the beliefs of the Episcopal Church. This placed him in the national spotlight. He was consecrated assistant bishop of Arkansas in 1898 and succeeded to the bishopric after the death of Henry Niles Pierce. Also in 1898, he received an honorary Doctor of Divinity from Kenyon College.

His 1907 book The Crucial Race Question, which supported the segregation of the church between whites and blacks, greatly angered the Northerners who usually contributed substantial sums to support his poor diocese. In the book, he writes that the only way for Black church members to raise in the church "ranks" was to have two separate churches. He denounced these views later in life. Brown created the Helen Dunlap School for Mountain Girls and a seminary to train a local ministry in Arkansas. From 1909 to 1910, he engaged in a sharp conflict with Trinity Cathedral in Little Rock (Pulaski County) over the issue of control over the cathedral and the refusal of the dean to read and compliment the bishop's new book, The Level Plan of Church Union. This dispute further alienated many in Arkansas. The Level Plan rejected many practices of the Episcopal Church and angered many supporters, who promptly insisted that he leave. In 1911, he returned to Galion, Ohio, and formally resigned as bishop of Arkansas in 1912, although he remained a bishop without a diocese, being nicknamed the "Wandering Bishop". He was succeeded as Bishop of Arkansas by James Rideout Winchester.

Brown began reading Charles Darwin, Karl Marx and other authors promoting a materialistic view of the world. Two years later, Brown announced his "conversion to science" in July 1913. He wrote to Episcopal bishops informing them of his new position. He rejected the historical Jesus, arguing that Jesus was "an idea" that was later turned into an historical person, echoing the views of Arthur Drews in The Christ Myth. "I no longer believed in a personal God, nor in a six-day creation, nor in a literal heaven and hell," Brown wrote. Creeds, he decided, were merely symbolical. Episcopal bishops reacted with indifference and strong hostility to his views.

Brown's evolution from Bishop of Arkansas (1899–1912), to finding an interest in Marxism, socialism, and Communism during the 1910s, to author of Communism and Christianism: Banish Gods from the Skies and Capitalists from the Earth (1920), dramatically increased and challenged his influence in the church. It led to his heresy trial by the House of Bishops in 1924–25. There he tried to prove to his fellow bishops that they did not believe in a strict interpretation of the Bible any more than he then did. Most of the Bishops considered Brown to be deranged and he was declared guilty of heresy, deposed and excommunicated. Repeated efforts to reinstate him were unsuccessful. However, while awaiting the final verdict on his deposition as bishop in October 1925, he was offered a place in both the Russian Orthodox Church, which was heavily influenced by Soviet authorities at the time, and the Old Catholic Church. He opted for the latter and was consecrated an Old Catholic bishop in a ceremony conducted in his own study in Galion. Because Old Catholic orders were accepted as valid by the Episcopal Church in the United States, Bishop Brown's position as a bishop in apostolic succession could not be challenged by his former church. Many Old Catholic churches count Bishop Brown in the line of succession of their bishops.

Brown felt that his real ministry began at age 71 when he started lecturing to the working class and writing a wider variety of books. When he encountered difficulty in finding a publisher, he published himself under the Bradford Brown Educational Company, Inc. He continued to write until his death in 1937 at the age of 82. Bishop Brown is buried beside his wife in Galion's Fairview Cemetery. His will left bequests to the Galion hospital and to Kenyon College.

== Works ==
- The Church for Americans, (1895)
- The Crucial Race Question, (1907)
- The Level Plan for Church Union, (1909)
- Communism and Christianism, (1920)
- Teachings of Marx for girls and boys (1935)
- Human meaning of Christian doctrines
- My heresy; the autobiography of an idea. New York, John Day, 1926.
- Communism, the new faith for a new world. Galion, Ohio The Bradford-Brown Educational Co.
- Science and History: For Girls and Boys
- The Christian Way Out: A Criticism
- The Bankruptcy of Christian Supernaturalism from the Viewpoint of the Trial
- The Bankruptcy of Christian Supernaturalism from the Viewpoint of Other Heretics in the Episcopal Church
- The Bankruptcy of Christian Supernaturalism from the Viewpoint of the World and the Church
- The Bankruptcy of Christian Supernaturalism from the Viewpoint of Science
- The Bankruptcy of Christian Supernaturalism from the Viewpoint of Philosophy
- The Bankruptcy of Christian Supernaturalism from the Viewpoint of Sociology
- The Bankruptcy of Christian Supernaturalism from the Viewpoint of the Bible
- The Bankruptcy of Christian Supernaturalism from the Viewpoint of History

== Brownella Cottage ==
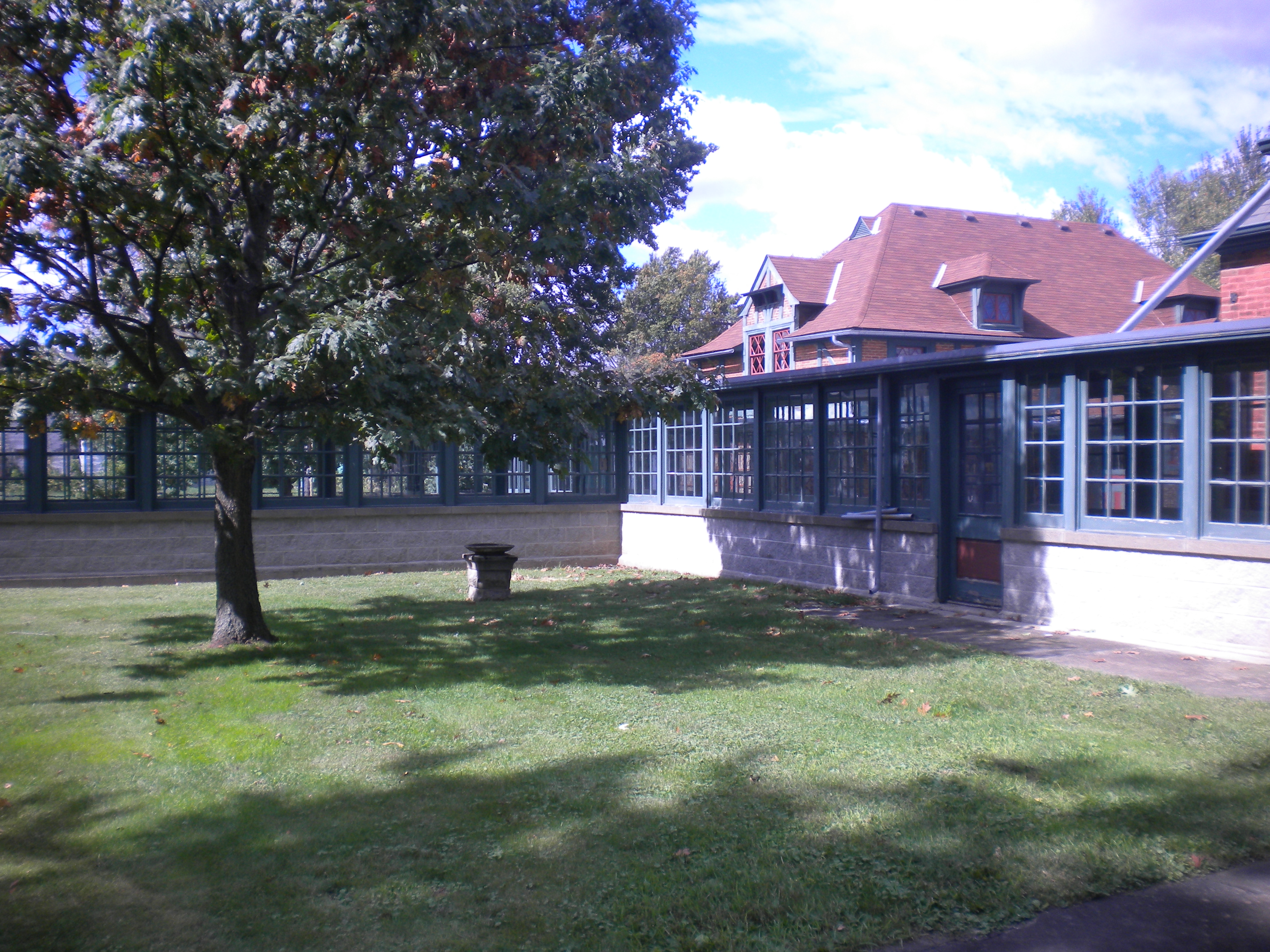
Brownella Cottage & Causeway

In December 1882, William Brown married Ella Scranton Bradford, adopted niece of Mary Scranton Bradford. Mrs. Bradford had Brownella Cottage built, across the street from Grace Church, as a wedding present for the couple. A brick structure from 1866 that had originally been used as St. Joseph Roman Catholic Church was preserved on the site to serve as William's study. Brownella Cottage was completed in 1887. The house reflected both the Bradford wealth and the high style of 1880s architecture in the United States. Ella Brown died in 1935; the bishop on October 31, 1937.

Brownella Cottage is owned by the Galion History Center, which operates it as part monument to Brown, part museum for the town of Galion. The ghosts of both Ella and William Brown are purported to haunt Brownella Cottage. It has been said that every Halloween night one can see the ghost of the bishop walking the glass causeway between the house and the study. One individual taking the guided tour reported smelling pipe smoke even though there were no pipe smokers present. The building has had many visitors, particularly around Halloween, who are drawn to the story of ghosts allegedly inhabiting the building.

The My Ghost Story television program ran an episode on Brownella Cottage offering accounts of several people claiming encounters with what they thought may have been a ghost.

== See also ==
- Communist Labor Party of America
