= St. Paul's Episcopal Church (Watertown, New York) =

Historic church in New York, United States

- Saint Paul's Episcopal Church
- U.S. National Register of Historic Places
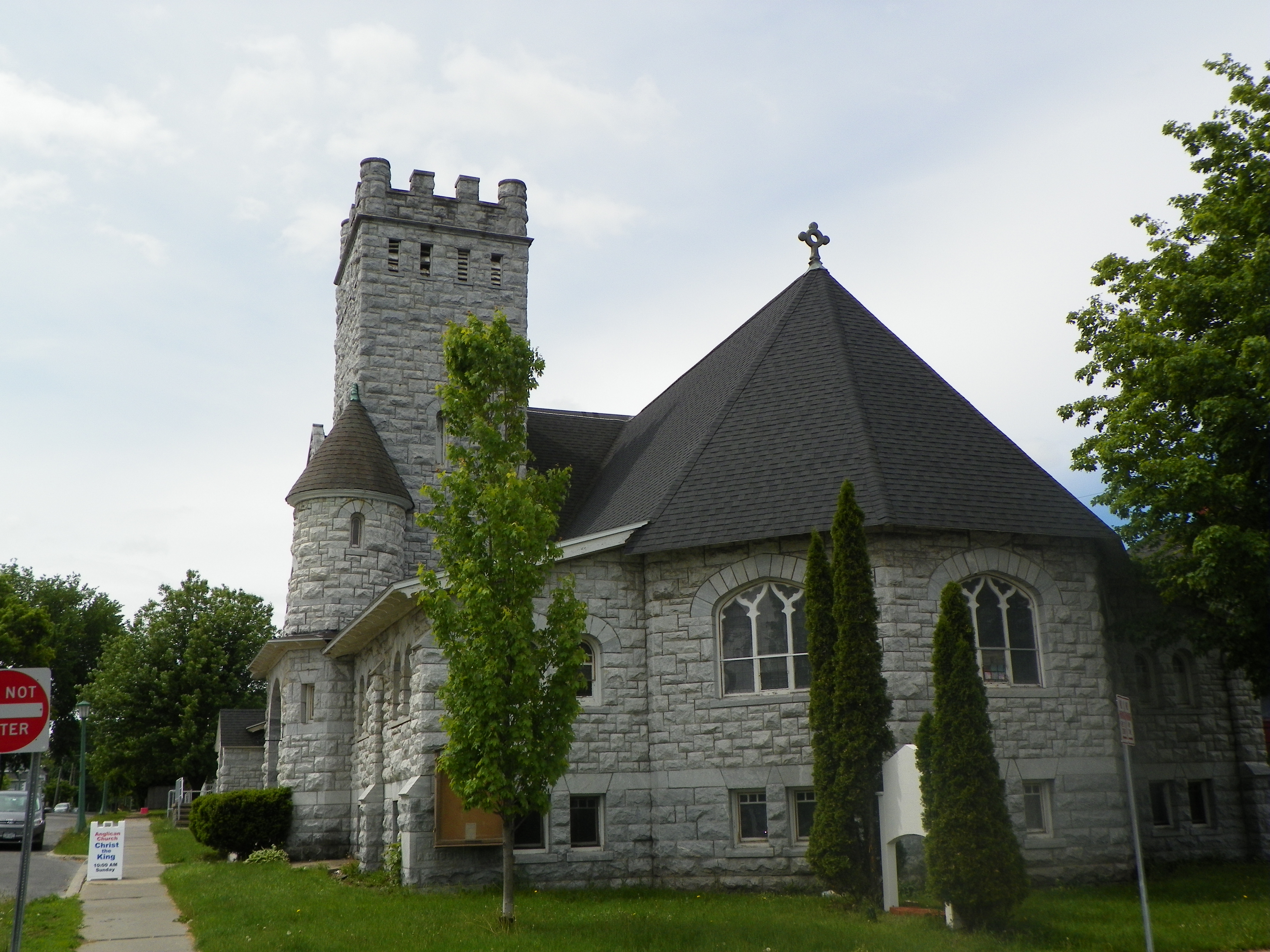

- Location within New York Location within the United States
- Location: 308-314 Clay St., Watertown, New York
- Coordinates: 43°58′19″N 75°54′28″W
- Area: less than one acre
- Built: 1889
- Architect: Valk, L.B., & Sons; Hose, John
- Architectural style: Romanesque
- MPS: Historic Churches of the Episcopal Diocese of Central New York MPS
- NRHP reference No.: 97000413
- Added to NRHP: May 23, 1997

Saint Paul's Episcopal Church is a historic Episcopal church located at Watertown in Jefferson County, New York. The church was built in 1889-1891 and is Romanesque Revival–style edifice. It is a one-storey, asymmetrically massed building of random course ashlar stone of light grey color. It features a three-story square stone tower with a crenellated top and round battlements at the corners and square ones in the center.

It was listed on the National Register of Historic Places in 1997.
