= Henry Niles Pierce =

American diocesan bishop

The Right Reverend Henry Niles Pierce D.D., LL.D.
- Bishop of Arkansas
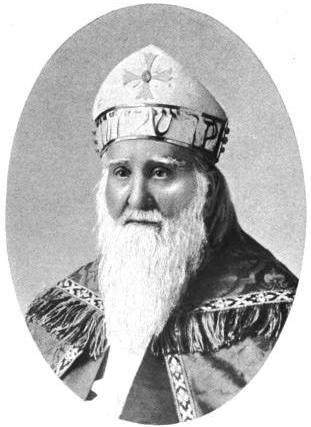
- Church: Episcopal Church
- Diocese: Arkansas
- Elected: October 14, 1869
- In office: 1870–1899
- Predecessor: Henry C. Lay
- Successor: William Montgomery Brown

Orders
- Ordination: January 3, 1849 by George W. Freeman
- Consecration: January 25, 1870 by William Mercer Green

Personal details
- Born: October 19, 1820 Pawtucket, Rhode Island, United States
- Died: September 5, 1899 (aged 78) Fayetteville, Arkansas, United States
- Buried: Oakland-Fraternal Cemetery
- Denomination: Anglican
- Spouse: Nannie Haywood Sheppard (m. 1854)
- Children: 3
- Education: Brown University

Henry Niles Pierce (October 19, 1820 – September 5, 1899) was the diocesan bishop of Arkansas in the Episcopal Church from 1870 until his death in 1899.

== Early life and education ==
Pierce was born on October 19, 1820, in Pawtucket, Rhode Island. He studied at Brown University, graduating in 1842. He was awarded a Doctor of Divinity in 1866 from the University of Alabama, and a Doctor of Laws in 1869 from the College of William & Mary.

== Career ==
He was ordained deacon on April 23, 1843, and then priest on January 3, 1849, on both occasions in Christ Church, Matagorda, Texas by Bishop George W. Freeman. He initially served as a missionary in Washington County, Texas, and then between 1854 and 1857, served in New Orleans and Rahway, New Jersey. In 1857, he became rector of St John's Church in Mobile, Alabama, while in 1868, he became rector of St Paul's Church in Springfield, Illinois.

== Episcopacy ==
On October 14, 1869, Pierce was elected Missionary Bishop of Arkansas and was consecrated in Christ Church, Mobile, Alabama on January 25, 1870, by Bishop William Mercer Green of Mississippi. In 1871, when the Diocese of Arkansas was created, he became the first diocesan bishop. He remained in office until his death in 1899.

== Bibliography ==
Pierce was the author of The Agnostic, and Other Poems.

== See also ==
- List of bishops of the Episcopal Church in the United States of America
