= St. Luke's Episcopal Church (Hot Springs, Arkansas) =

Historic church in Arkansas, United States

- U.S. National Register of Historic Places
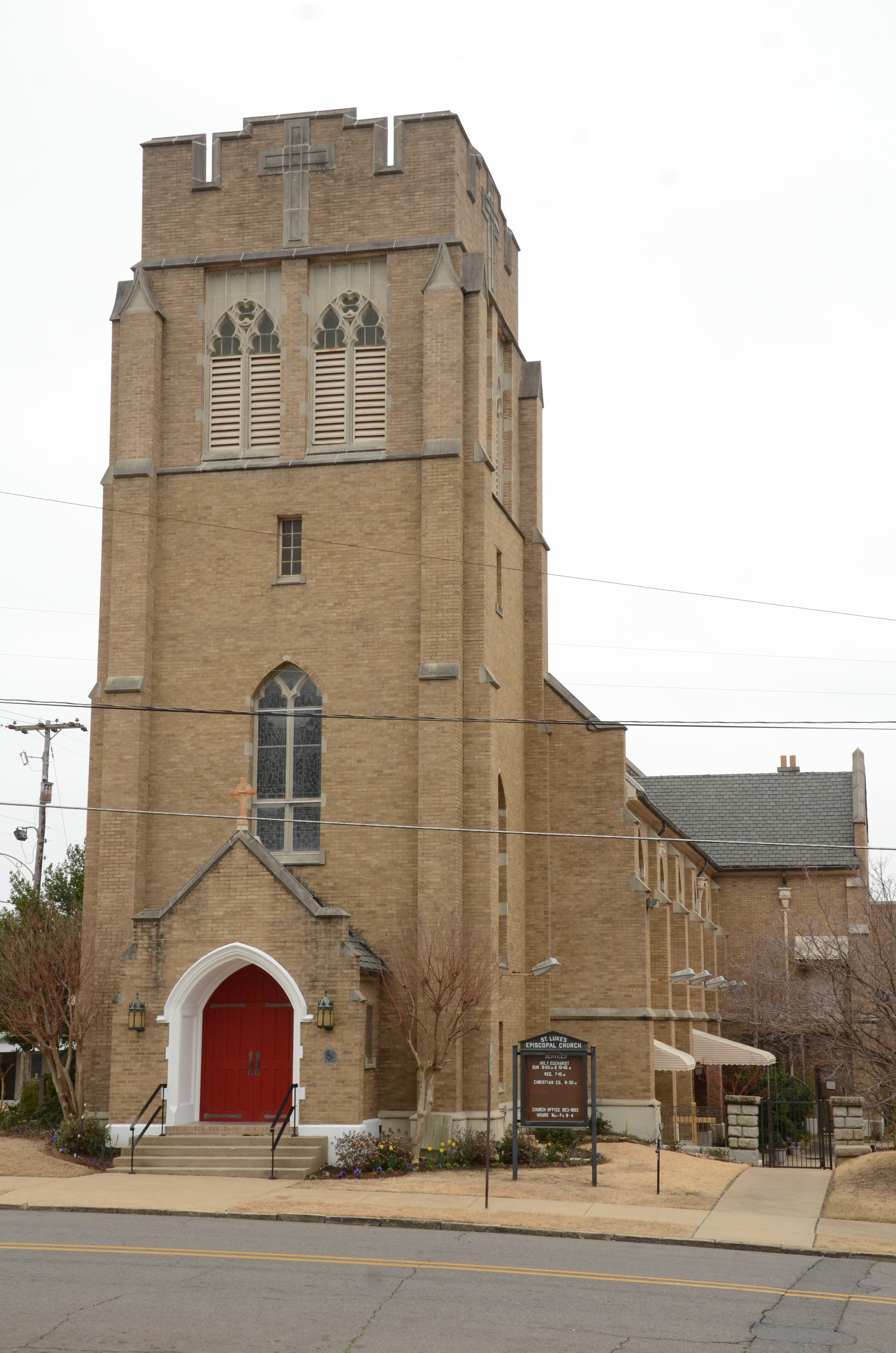

- Location within Arkansas Location within the United States
- Location: Spring and Cottage Sts., Hot Springs, Arkansas
- Coordinates: 34°30′38″N 93°3′7″W
- Area: less than one acre
- Built: 1925
- Architect: Thompson & Harding
- Architectural style: Late Gothic Revival
- MPS: Thompson, Charles L., Design Collection TR
- NRHP reference No.: 82000821
- Added to NRHP: December 22, 1982

St. Luke's Episcopal Church is a parish of the Episcopal Church located in Hot Springs, Arkansas, in the Diocese of Arkansas. The congregation was established in 1866. The Rev. Mark Nabors has served as rector since August 2023.

In 2016, the church reported 689 members; in 2023, it reported 550 members. No membership statistics were reported in 2024 national parochial reports. Plate and pledge financial support reported by the church in 2024 was $543,037. Average Sunday Attendance (ASA) reported in 2024 was 162 persons. This was a relative decrease from ASA of 185 persons reported in 2018.

== Building ==
The noted building is located at Spring and Cottage Streets, completed in 1926 to replace the previous structure, which had been destroyed by a tornado. The church is a stone Gothic Revival building designed by Thompson and Harding. Its gable-roofed nave is dominated by a massive buttressed stone tower at the front, topped by a tall parapet. A stained glass window is set in the tower, just above the projecting gable-roofed entrance vestibule. It was listed on the National Register of Historic Places in 1982.

== See also ==
- National Register of Historic Places listings in Garland County, Arkansas
