= John T. W. Harmon =

American prelate of the Episcopal Church (born 1954)

The Right Reverend John T. W. Harmon
- Bishop of Arkansas
- Church: Episcopal Church
- Diocese: Arkansas
- Elected: August 19, 2023

Orders
- Ordination: February 1, 1992 by Frank Vest
- Consecration: January 6, 2024 by Jeff W. Fisher

Personal details
- Born: John T. W. Harmon
- Denomination: Anglican
- Spouse: Keeva
- Children: 3
- Education: Staint Paul's College (BA); Virginia Theological Seminary (MDiv); Union Presbyterian Seminary (ThM

John T. W. Harmon is the fourteenth Bishop of Arkansas. Born in Liberia, he was ordained to the priesthood in 1992 in the Episcopal Diocese of Southern Virginia after graduating from Virginia Theological Seminary.

Prior to his election, Harmon was the Rector of Trinity Episcopal Church in Washington, DC, and a priest of the Episcopal Diocese of Washington.

After his ordination, he served as Episcopal Chaplain at Norfolk State University and Assistant Rector at Grace Episcopal Church in Norfolk. He then served for seven years as Rector of St. Stephen's Episcopal Church in Petersburg, Virginia before being called to Trinity.
