= Edwin Denby =

Edwin Denby may refer to:

- Edwin Denby (poet) (1903–1983), American dance critic and poet
- Edwin Denby (politician) (1870–1929), American politician
