= James Ridout Winchester =

Episcopal bishop of Arkansas (1852–1941)

The Right Reverend James Ridout Winchester D.D.
- Bishop of Arkansas
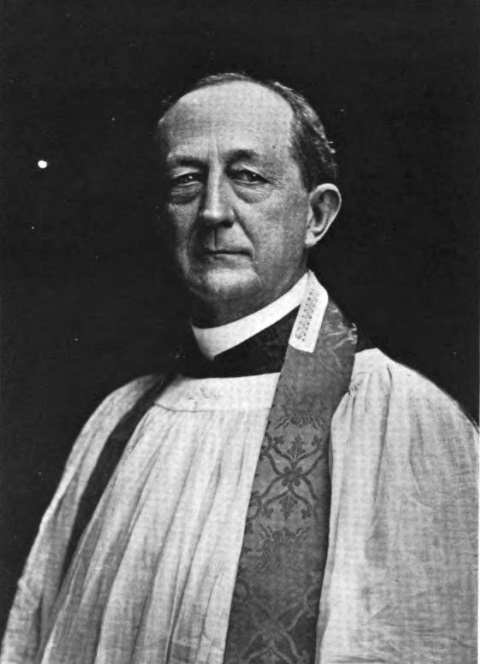
- Church: Episcopal Church
- Diocese: Arkansas
- Elected: May 1911
- In office: 1912–1931
- Predecessor: William Montgomery Brown
- Successor: Edwin Warren Saphore
- Previous post: Coadjutor Bishop of Arkansas (1911-1912)

Orders
- Ordination: June 28, 1878 by Francis McNeece Whittle
- Consecration: September 29, 1911 by Daniel S. Tuttle

Personal details
- Born: March 15, 1852 Annapolis, Maryland, United States
- Died: October 27, 1941 (aged 89) Chicago, Illinois, United States
- Buried: Old Chapel (Millwood, Virginia)
- Denomination: Anglican
- Parents: Jacob Winchester & Mary Ogle Ridout
- Spouse: Elizabeth Atkinson Lee (m. 1878; died 1936)
- Children: 4
- Education: Washington and Lee University

James Ridout Winchester (March 15, 1852 – October 27, 1941) was bishop of the Episcopal Diocese of Arkansas, serving from 1912 to 1931, succeeding William Montgomery Brown.

== Early life and education ==
Winchester was born on March 15, 1852, in Annapolis, Maryland, the son of Jacob Winchester and Mary Ogle Ridout. He was educated at the Episcopal High School in Alexandria, Virginia and graduated from Washington and Lee University with a Bachelor of Arts in 1874. He also graduated from the Virginia Theological Seminary in 1877 with a Bachelor of Divinity. He was awarded a Doctor of Divinity from the Washington and Lee University in 1895, and another from the University of the South in 1894. He married Elizabeth Atkinson Lee in Clarke, Virginia, on April 17, 1878.

== Ordained ministry ==
Winchester was ordained deacon on June 29, 1877, and priest on June 28, 1878, by Bishop Francis McNeece Whittle of Virginia. He served as assistant of St James' Church in Richmond, Virginia between 1877 and 78, and then rector of Holy Cross Church in Uniontown, Alabama between 1878 and 1880. In 1880, he became rector of St John's Church in Wytheville, Virginia, while in 1882, he transferred to Christ Church in Macon, Georgia. Between 1890 and 1898, he served as rector of Christ Church in Nashville, Tennessee, and then as rector of the Church of the Ascension in St. Louis between 1898 and 1905. He then became rector of Calvary Church in Memphis, Tennessee in 1905, and served until 1911.

== Bishop ==
Winchester was elected Coadjutor Bishop of Arkansas in May 1911, and was consecrated on September 29, 1911, with Presiding Bishop Daniel S. Tuttle as chief consecrator. He succeeded as diocesan bishop on April 24, 1912. He remained in office until his retirement in 1931. He died on October 27, 1941, in Chicago.
