= Jean-Claude Gorgy =

French playwright

Jean-Claude Gorgy (19 November 1753, Fontainebleau – 1795, Pinceloup, hamlet of Sonchamp, near Rambouillet) was an 18th-century French playwright. Jean-Claude Gorgy was the son of a valet to the Count de Maillebois. He himself became secretary of the count.

== Works ==
- 1784: Nouveau voyage sentimental, Bastien
- 1787: Les torts apparents, ou La famille amériquaine, comedy in prose and in three actes, premiered in Paris, at the Théâtre du Palais-Royal, 15 March 1787, Cailleau
- 1788: Blançay, par l'auteur du Nouveau Voyage sentimental, Guillot
- 1789: Mémoire sur les dépôts de mendicité, Guillot
- 1789: Victorine, par l'auteur de Blançay, Guillot
- 1790: Lidorie, ancienne chronique allusive, publiée par l'auteur de Blançay, Guillot
- 1791: Tablettes sentimentales du bon Pamphile, pendant les mois d'août, septembre, octobre et novembre, en 1789, Guillot
- 1791–1792: ’Ann’quin bredouille, ou le Petit cousin de Tristram Shandy, œuvre posthume de Jacqueline Lycurgues, Guillot, Cuchet (on Google Books: vol.2, vol.4, vol.5)

== Bibliography ==
- Nicolas-Toussaint Des Essarts, Les Siècles littéraires de la France, volume 3, Chez l'auteur, imprimeur-libraire, 1800, p. 281
- Charles Monselet, Les Oubliés et les Dédaignés, figures littéraires de la fin du XVIIIe siècle, Poulet-Malassis et De Broise, 1861
- Fernand Drujon, Les Livres à clef, étude de bibliographie critique et analytique pour servir à l'histoire littéraire, E. Rouveyre, 1888, p. 66-67
- (in English) Rene Bosch, Labyrinth of Digressions: Tristram Shandy as Perceived and Influenced by Sterne's Early Imitators, Rodopi, 2007, p. 188-191
