= Historic Arkansas Museum =

History museum in Arkansas, US

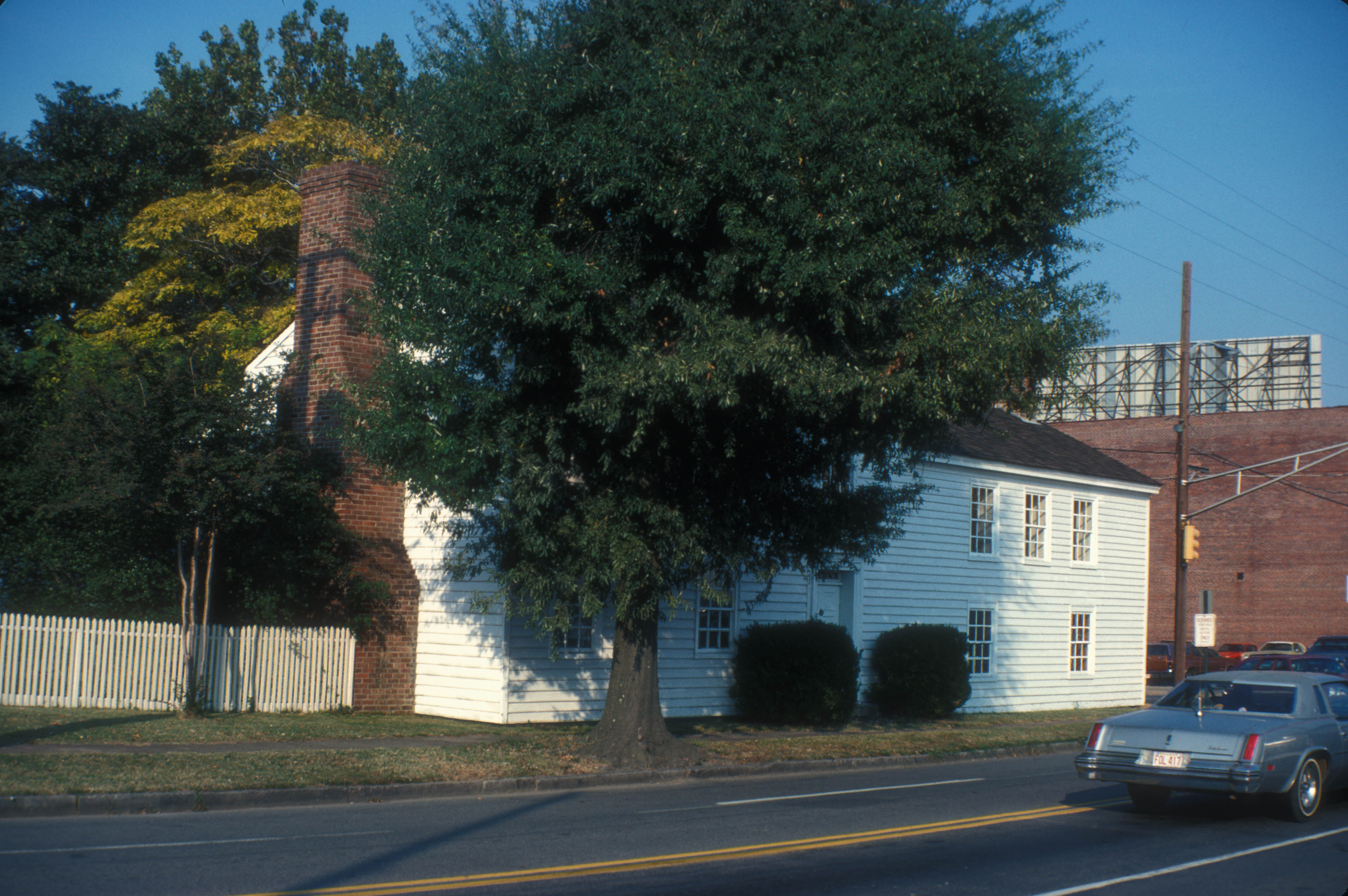
- Hinderliter House, part of the Historic Arkansas Museum

- Location in Arkansas Location in United States
- Established: 1941
- Location: 200 E. Third Street; Little Rock, Arkansas
- Coordinates: 34°44′47″N 92°16′08″W
- Type: History museum
- Website: www.arkansasheritage.com/historic-arkansas-museum/

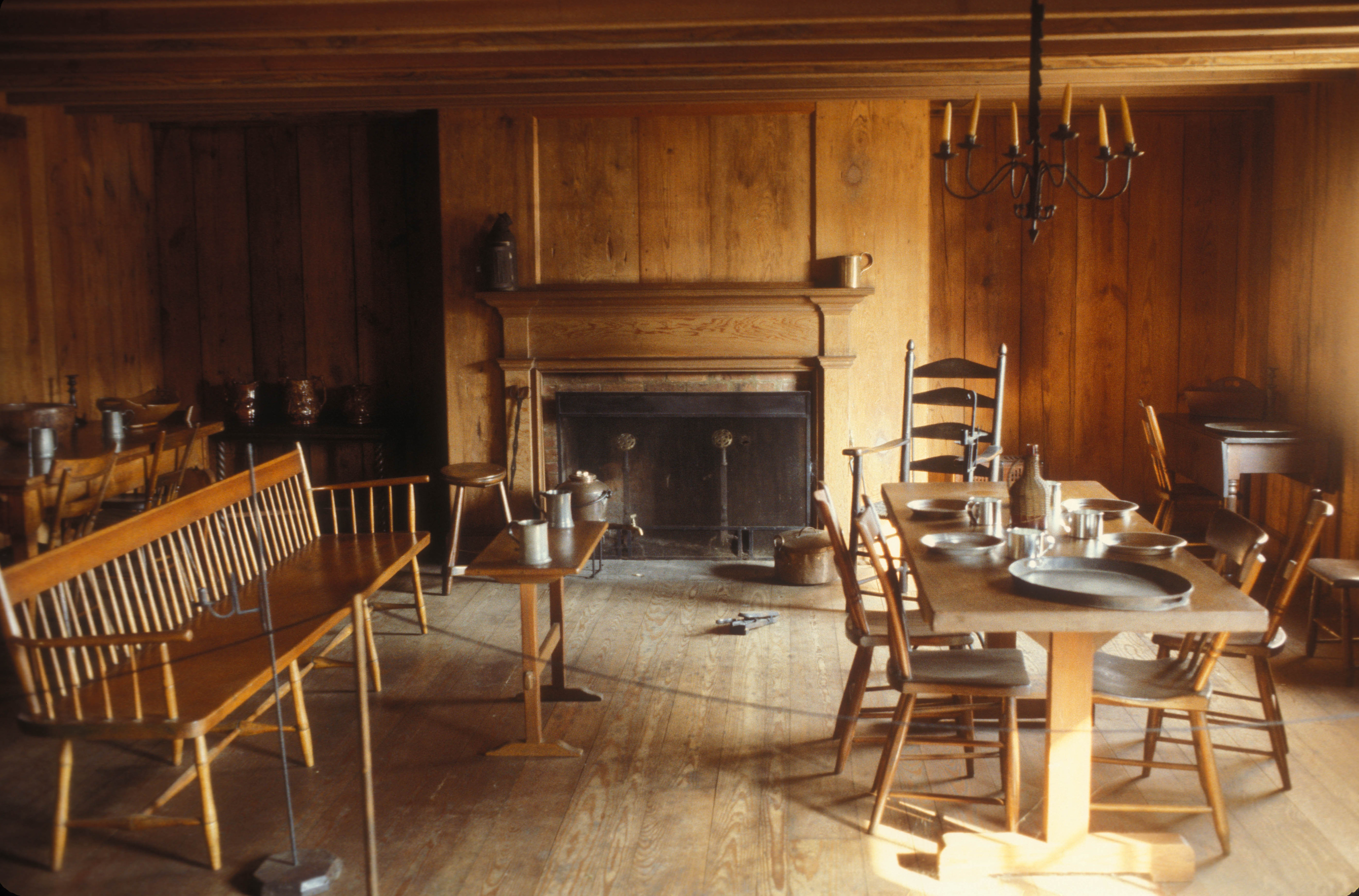
Interior of the Hinderliter House

The Historic Arkansas Museum (HAM) is a state history museum in downtown Little Rock, Arkansas.

The museum was created as part of the Arkansas Territorial Capitol Restoration Commission, by Act 388 of the 1939 Arkansas General Assembly. The act named Louise Loughborough as chairwoman of the commission. Loughborough had been named to the Little Rock Planning Commission in 1935. Several houses near Cumberland and East 3rd Streets in downtown Little Rock were going to be condemned, including the Hinderliter House, the oldest building in Little Rock. Loughborough started a public relations campaign around Little Rock as a "town of three Capitols": the Hinderliter House, the Old State House, and the current Arkansas State Capitol Building. Use of the Hinderliter House as the last meeting place of the Arkansas Territorial Legislature has remained part of popular folklore, though it is not known if it was used for this purpose. Loughborough then gained support from the Works Progress Administration, the Arkansas General Assembly, and private donors. Loughborough worked with architect Max Mayer to restore the half-block of houses at Cumberland and East 3rd Street in downtown Little Rock. The Museum opened on July 19, 1941.

The museum maintains gallery space and a number of historic buildings original to the site, as well as log structures transported from around the state. It was previously known as the Arkansas Territorial Restoration, but the name was changed in 2001 when new exhibit space and renovations were completed. The museum is an affiliate within the Smithsonian Affiliations program. The museum property was listed on the National Register of Historic Places in 2019 as the Arkansas Territorial Restoration Historic District.

== Collections ==
=== Art and paintings ===
- A. J. Freeman
- Adrian Brewer
- Albina "Coon" Lyon
- Alfred R. Waud
- D. Rice
- D. J. Watkins
- Elsie Freund
- Henry Byrd
- Horman Quen
- Howard Simon
- J.R. Lambdin
- Jenny Eakin Delony
- John James Aududon
- Jose De Salazar
- Josephine Graham
- Louis Freund
- Max Mayer
- Samuel Alred Harding
- Thomas Wilson
- W.M. Brown
- William Frye

=== Furniture ===
The museum has a variety of 18th century furniture pieces, ranging from chairs, clothes press, library tables, and sugar chests. Most furniture pieces in the collection were acquired by the Loughborough Trust Purchase.

=== Guns ===
A small collection of 18th-century firearms can be found in the Arkansas Museum.

- Percussion Pistol | Made by John Pearson, Dated 1860
- Caplock Pistol | Made by A.R. Mendenhall, Dated 1855
- Caplock Rifle | Made by W.O. Robertson, Dated 1870
- Colt Navy Revolver | Made by Samuel Colt, Dated 1860
- Flintlock Rifle

=== Hunting horns ===
- Arkansas Traveler Hunting Horn | Dated 1880
- Hunting Horn
- Hunting Dog Ornamented Hunting Horn | Dated 1860
- Hunting Horn | Made by Dr. C.K. Mason, Dated 1895
- Hunting Horn | Made by H.J. Williams, Dated 1914

=== Jewelry ===
- Bracelet | Made by Elsie Freund, Dated 1930
- Hair brooch | Owned by Sarah Downs, Dated 1868
- Pendant | Made by Elsie Freund, Dated 1930
- Pocketwatch | Owned by A.A. Turner, Dated 1870

=== Knives ===
The museum has a collection of ten bowie style knives. The entire collection ranges from the mid-1800s to the mid-1900s.

=== Photographs ===
- B.S. Alford
- Diehl and Kennedy
- Thomas W. Bankes
- Keystone View Company
- John F. Kennedy

=== Pottery ===
- Blue Crackel Vase | Made by Camden Pottery, Dated 1925
- Bowl | Made by Niloak Pottery, Dated 1925
- Churn | Made by J.R. Wilbur, Dated 1867
- Churn | Made by Lafayette Glass Pottery, Dated 1870
- Jar | Made by George Washington Cranston, Dated 1860
- Vase | Made by Charles Stehm, Dated 1926

=== Pottery of Caddo ===
A collection of several Caddo pottery pieces, all made between 1500 and 1600.

== See also ==
- List of historical societies in Arkansas
