= Robert R. Brown (bishop) =

American bishop & author (1910–1994)

The Right Reverend Robert R. Brown
- Bishop of Arkansas
- Church: Episcopal Church
- Diocese: Arkansas
- Elected: 1955
- In office: 1956–1970
- Predecessor: R. Bland Mitchell
- Successor: Christoph Keller Jr.
- Previous post: Coadjutor Bishop of Arkansas (1955-1956)

Orders
- Ordination: December 24, 1937 by William Theodotus Capers
- Consecration: October 5, 1955 by John Vander Horst

Personal details
- Born: June 16, 1910 Garden City, Kansas, United States
- Died: February 5, 1994 (aged 83) Little Rock, Arkansas, United States
- Buried: Mount Holly Cemetery
- Denomination: Anglican
- Parents: Joseph Leslie Brown, Madeline Swan Wells
- Spouse: Katherine Warwick Rust (m. 1937; died 1992)
- Children: 3
- Education: St. Mary's University, Texas

Robert Raymond Brown (June 16, 1910 – February 5, 1994) was an author and the bishop of Arkansas in The Episcopal Church.

== Early life and education ==
Brown was born on June 16, 1910, in Garden City, Kansas, the son of a dentist, Joseph Leslie Brown, and Madeline Swan Wells. He studied at the Texas Military Institute, and then at St. Mary's University, Texas, from where he earned a Bachelor of Arts in 1933. He then had a brief high school coaching career before attending Virginia Theological Seminary from where he graduated with a Bachelor of Divinity in 1937. He married Katherine Warwick Rust on November 3, 1937, and had three children.

== Ordained ministry ==
Brown was ordained deacon on June 20, 1937, and priest on December 24, 1937, by Bishop William Theodotus Capers of West Texas. He served as priest-in-charge of All Saints' Church in San Benito, Texas, and St Alban's Church in Harlingen, Texas between 1937 and 1940, before becoming associate rector of Trinity Church in Houston, Texas in 1940. Between 1941 and 1947, he was rector of St Paul's Church in Waco, Texas while between 1947 and 1955, he served as rector of St Paul's Church in Richmond, Virginia.

== Bishop ==
In 1955, Brown was elected Coadjutor Bishop of Arkansas and was consecrated on October 5, 1955, by Bishop John Vander Horst of Tennessee. He then succeeded as diocesan bishop on October 5, 1956. He retired on November 1, 1970. Following his retirement, he served St. Thaddeus Episcopal Church in Chattanooga, Tennessee. Brown died in Little Rock, Arkansas on February 5, 1994.

== Civil rights ==
Brown was a civil rights advocate who worked to bring an end to racial discrimination and segregation. He was as a Trustee of the American Church Institute for Negroes. In 1957 he became involved in the desegregation of Central High School in Little Rock, Arkansas.

== Works ==
- "And One was a Soldier": The Spiritual Pilgrimage of Robert E. Lee. Shippensburg, Pennsylvania: White Mane Books. 1998. ISBN 1572491183.
- Bigger Than Little Rock. Greenwich, Connecticut: Seabury Press. 1958.
- "The Mountains in Reply". London: Forgotten Books. 2019. ISBN 978-1528020831.
