= Trinity Episcopal Cathedral (Little Rock, Arkansas) =

Historic church in Arkansas, United States

- U.S. National Register of Historic Places
- U.S. Historic district – Contributing property
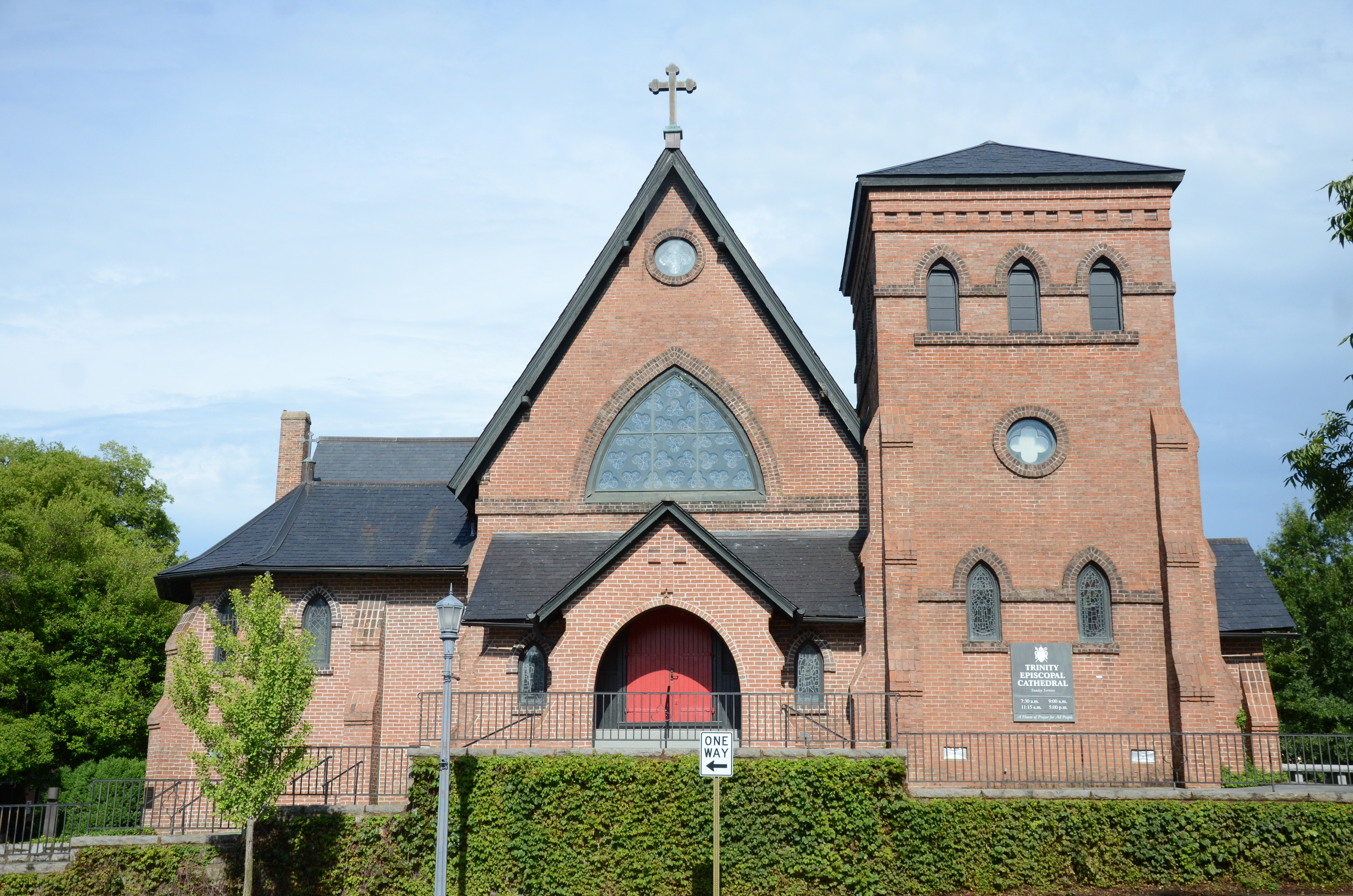

- Location within Arkansas Location within the United States
- Location: 310 W. 17th St. Little Rock, Arkansas
- Coordinates: 34°43′59″N 92°16′35″W
- Area: less than one acre
- Built: 1884-1892
- Architect: Rt. Rev. Henry Niles Pierce, Ambrose Pettefer
- Architectural style: Gothic Revival
- Part of: Governor's Mansion Historic District (ID78000620)
- NRHP reference No.: 76000460

Significant dates
- Added to NRHP: May 13, 1976
- Designated CP: September 13, 1978

Trinity Episcopal Cathedral is an historic church building at 310 West 17th Street in Little Rock, Arkansas, United States. It is the seat of the Diocese of Arkansas and is listed on the National Register of Historic Places. The cathedral reported 1,464 members in 2015 and 1,563 members in 2023; no membership statistics were reported in 2024 parochial reports. Plate and pledge income for the congregation in 2024 was $1,451,197 with average Sunday attendance (ASA) of 237.

== History ==
The fundraising for constructing the cathedral was done entirely by the Rt. Rev. Henry Niles Pierce, who was the fourth missionary bishop and the first diocesan bishop of Arkansas. He went on preaching tours on the East Coast of the United States, procured private gifts, and mortgaged his own house. The church itself was built in three stages as finances allowed.

The nave and the baptistery were completed first and the first service was held in the cathedral on October 19, 1884. On that same date the cathedral was formally established. The transept and crossing were completed in February 1889, and the altar was moved from its original position under the west window to its new position under the north transept window. The structure was finally completed when the chancel was built in time for Easter in 1892. The altar was moved permanently to the east side of the church at that time. The present altar and reredos were carved in Oberammergau and were donated in memory of Frances Blakeslee and Philander Keep Roots in 1924.

The Parish House was built in 1951, and the Cathedral House was completed two years later. The Lyman Annex was added to the cathedral complex in 1966 and the Chancellors Hall in 1981. The cathedral itself was listed on the National Register of Historic Places in 1976. In 1987, an order for eight bells for the bell tower was placed with the Whitechapel Bell Foundry of London. They were installed the following year and are rung in the traditional English style of change ringing.

In 1998, when the Very Rev. Henry Lee Hudson was Dean, close to $5 million was spent in renovating the Cathedral proper. The Dean's Hall was erected at this time. The Muller Pipe Organ Co. of Toledo, Ohio installed a 4-manual, 82-rank pipe organ the following year.

== See also ==
- List of the Episcopal cathedrals of the United States
- List of cathedrals in the United States
- National Register of Historic Places listings in Little Rock, Arkansas
