= Episcopal Diocese of Arkansas =

Diocese of the Episcopal Church in the United States

Coordinates: 34.732767°N 92.275938°W

Diocese of Arkansas Diœcesis Arkansiana
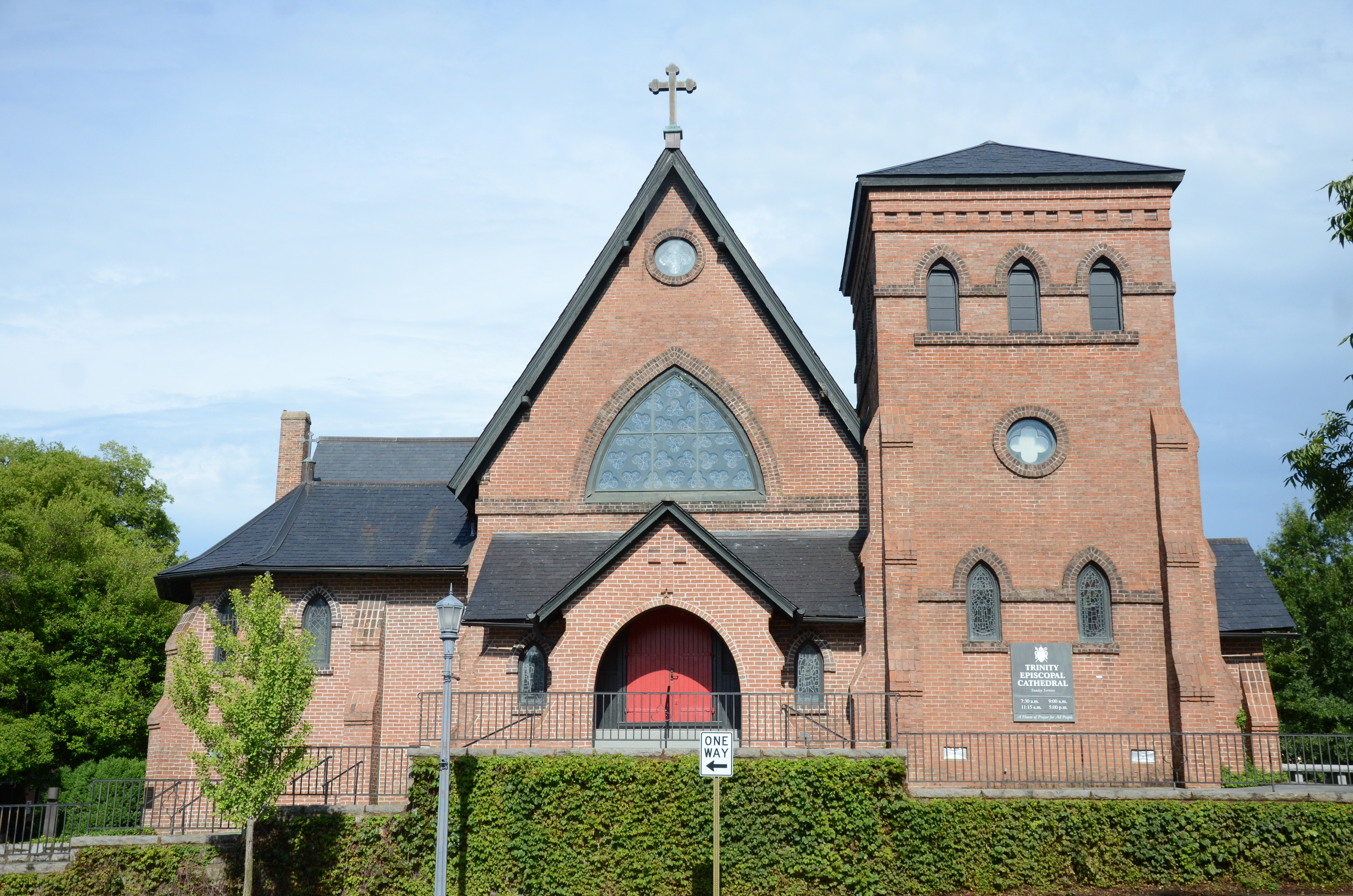
- Trinity Episcopal Cathedral in Little Rock

Location
- Country: United States
- Territory: Arkansas
- Ecclesiastical province: Province VII

Statistics
- Congregations: 55 (2025)
- Members: 12,213 (2025)

Information
- Denomination: Episcopal Church
- Established: April 24, 1871
- Cathedral: Trinity Cathedral

Current leadership
- Bishop: John T. W. Harmon

Map
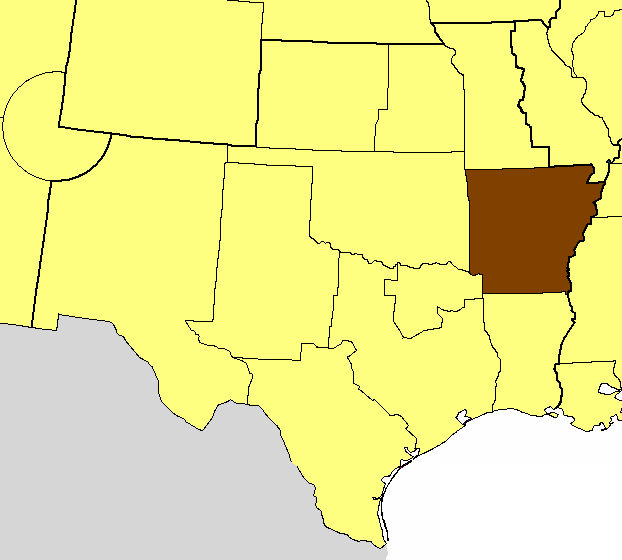
- Location of the Diocese of Arkansas

Website
- episcopalarkansas.org

The Episcopal Diocese of Arkansas is part of the Episcopal Church in the United States and the worldwide Anglican Communion. The Diocese is organized into 55 congregations, with its diocesan office in Little Rock. The seat of the Bishop of Arkansas is Trinity Cathedral, Little Rock.

The diocese reported 13,878 members in 2015 and 12,213 members in 2025. Plate and pledge income for the 55 filing congregations of the diocese in 2025 was $13,254,604. Average Sunday attendance (ASA) in 2025 was 3,363 persons, down from 4,701 in 2015.

Missionary bishops over Arkansas
From	Until	Incumbent	Notes
1838	1841	Leonidas Polk, Missionary Bishop for the Southwest	Consecrated at Christ Church, Cincinnati, Ohio, on December 9, 1838.
1841	c. 1844	James Hervey Otey, Bishop of Tennessee	As Missionary bishop to Arkansas, Mississippi and the Indian Territory.
1844	1858	George W. Freeman, Missionary Bishop of Arkansas	Consecrated at Christ Church, Cincinnati, Ohio, on December 9, 1838.
1858	1859	James Hervey Otey, Bishop of Tennessee	Provisional bishop.
1859	1869	Henry C. Lay, Missionary Bishop of Arkansas	Missionary bishop.
Bishops of Arkansas
1870	1899	Henry Niles Pierce	Missionary bishop and first diocesan bishop (October 19, 1820, Pawtucket, Rhode Island – September 5, 1899, Fayetteville, AR); died in office.
1899	1912	William Montgomery Brown	Coadjutor 1897–1899; Diocesan 1899–1912. Tried for heresy in 1924–1925.
1912	1931	James Ridout Winchester	Coadjutor 1911–12; Diocesan 1912–31. (March 15, 1852, Annapolis, MD – October 27, 1941, Chicago, IL)
		Edward Thomas Demby, suffragan bishop (1918-1939)	(February 13, 1869, Wilmington, DE – October 14, 1957, Cleveland, OH)
1935	1938	Edwin Warren Saphore	Suffragan 1917–35; Diocesan 1935–37. (Died May 22, 1944, Syracuse, NY, aged 89)
1938	1956	Richard Bland Mitchell	Known as Bland.
1956	1970	Robert R. Brown	Coadjutor 1955–56; Diocesan 1956–70. (June 16, 1910, Garden City, KS – February 5, 1994, Little Rock, AR)
1970	1981	Christoph Keller, Jr.	Coadjutor 1967–70; Diocesan 1970–81. (December 22, 1915, Bay City, MI – May 19, 1995, Alexandria, LA)
1981	1993	Herbert A. Donovan, Jr. (Note: Donovan, Maze and Benfield are officially numbered as XI, XII and XIII bishops respectively.)	Herbert Alcorn "Herb" Donovan, Junior (July 14, 1931 - November 2, 2025); consecrated 1980; now a retired Assisting Bishop in New York.
1994	2007	Larry Maze	(born September 13, 1943)
2007	2024	Larry R. Benfield	Elected 11 November 2006.
2024	present	John T. W. Harmon	Elected 19 August 2023.
