= List of Sewanee: The University of the South people =

This is a list of some notable people affiliated with Sewanee: The University of the South.

== Arts ==
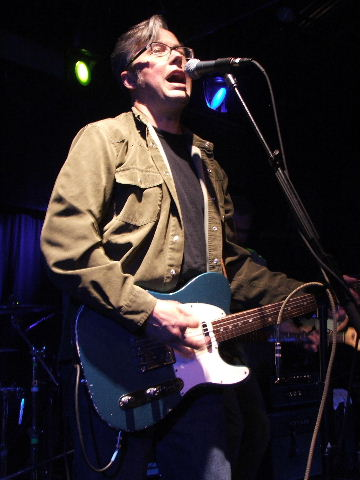
Radney Foster, country music artist

=== Literature ===
- Franklin Burroughs, author
- H.T. Kirby-Smith, author and poet
- Thomas Lakeman, author
- Andrew Nelson Lytle, author and former editor, Sewanee Review
- Aaron McCollough, poet
- Speer Morgan, novelist, short story writer and editor
- William Alexander Percy, poet and memoirist
- Wyatt Prunty, poet and founding director of the Sewanee Writers' Conference
- Monroe K. Spears, critic, editor of The Sewanee Review, professor at Rice University
- John Jeremiah Sullivan, writer, Southern editor of The Paris Review, author of Pulphead
- Allen Tate, poet, critic, assistant editor of The Sewanee Review
- Bertram Wyatt-Brown, historian, author

=== Music ===
- Radney Foster, singer/songwriter
- Jonathan Meiburg, musician
- Tupper Saussy, composer, musician
- Amanda Shires, singer/songwriter, violin player

=== Photography ===
- Stephen Alvarez, photojournalist and National Geographic photographer

=== Television and film ===
- Julian Adams, film producer, writer, and actor
- Paul Harris Boardman, film producer and screenwriter
- Anson Mount, stage, film, and television actor, Hell on Wheels
- John Swasey, voice actor
- Jean Yarbrough, film and television director

== Athletics ==
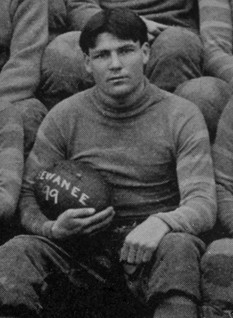
"Diddy" Seibels

- Walter Barrett
- Chigger Browne
- Eric Cheape
- Wild Bill Claiborne
- Rupert Colmore
- Harris G. Cope
- Charlie Dexter, Major League Baseball player
- Frank Faulkinberry
- Jenks Gillem
- Delmas Gooch
- Joe B. Hall, University of Kentucky head basketball coach
- Orin Helvey
- Frank Juhan
- Aubrey Lanier
- Shirley Majors, Sewanee coach and father of Johnny Majors and Bobby Majors
- Lawrence Markley
- Henry D. Phillips
- Kyle Rote Jr., soccer player
- Phil Savage, former Senior VP and General Manager, Cleveland Browns
- John Scarbrough
- Henry Seibels, captain of 1899 Sewanee Tigers football team
- John Shoop, football coach
- Ormond Simkins
- Lee Tolley
- Silas Williams
- Warbler Wilson
- Eben Wortham, All-Southern fullback in 1917

== Education ==
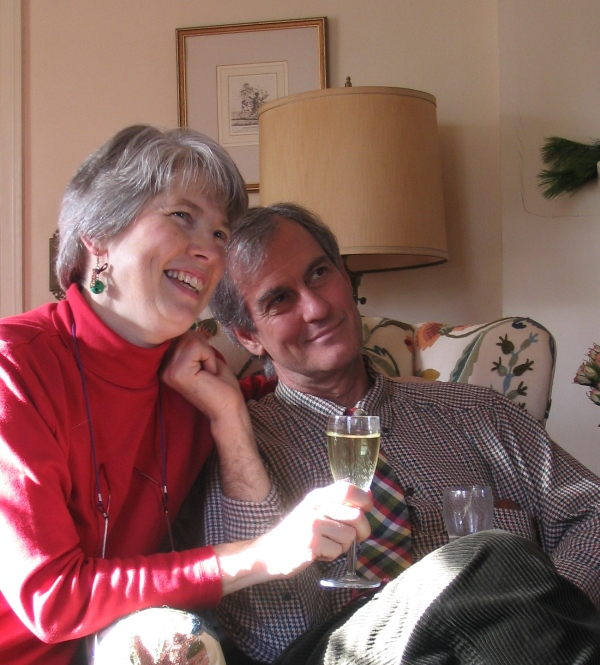
Samuel and Victoria Pickering

- Douglass Adair, historian and editor of the William and Mary Quarterly
- Alan P. Bell, psychologist at the Kinsey Institute
- Benjamin B. Dunlap, president of Wofford College
- John V. Fleming, professor emeritus at Princeton University
- Rayid Ghani, professor of Machine Learning and Public Policy at Carnegie Mellon University and chief scientist, Obama for America 2012 Campaign
- W. Cabell Greet (1901–1972), philologist and McIntosh Professor of English at Barnard College
- Thomas N.E. Greville (1910–1998), mathematician and professor at University of Wisconsin-Madison
- J. G. de Roulhac Hamilton (1878–1961), historian, archivist, and professor at the University of North Carolina at Chapel Hill
- Jeff McMahan, White's Professor of Moral Philosophy, University of Oxford
- Charles H. McNutt, archaeologist and professor at Memphis State University
- Richard Mitchell, "The Underground Grammarian"
- Walter Nance, professor of Human Genetics at Virginia Commonwealth University
- Eric Woodfin Naylor (1936–2019), Hispanist and translator of el Libro de buen amor
- Samuel F. Pickering Jr., professor of English at the University of Connecticut; inspiration for Mr. Keating in the film Dead Poets Society
- Douglas Porch, professor at the Naval Postgraduate School
- Harry Huntt Ransom, president and Chancellor of the University of Texas System
- S. Lynne Stokes, statistician and professor at Southern Methodist University
- Richard Tillinghast, English teacher and poet
- Bertram Wyatt-Brown, historian and professor at the University of Florida and Case Western University

== Journalism ==
- Clarence Faulk, publisher of Ruston Daily Leader; owner of radio station KRUS; diversified businessman in Ruston, Louisiana
- Ward Greene (1892–1956), journalist, playwright and editor
- Smith Hempstone, journalist and U.S. ambassador to Kenya
- Jack Hitt, author and contributing editor of New York Times Magazine, Harper's Magazine and This American Life
- Roger Hodge, deputy editor of The Intercept, former editor of Harper's Magazine and The Oxford American
- Jon Meacham, Carolyn T. and Robert M. Rogers Chair in American Presidency at Vanderbilt University, former editor-in-chief of Newsweek; winner of 2009 Pulitzer Prize for biography

== Law ==
- Phelan Beale, lawyer of Grey Gardens fame
- Stuart Bowen, Special Inspector General for Iraq Reconstruction, 2004–2013
- Robert L. Brown, associate justice, Arkansas Supreme Court
- Alexander Campbell King, solicitor general of the United States and judge of United States Court of Appeals for the Fifth Circuit
- Benjamin Franklin Cameron (1890–1964), judge of the United States Court of Appeals for the Fifth Circuit
- Bill Lewis, United States district judge, Middle District of Alabama
- Thorn Lord, lawyer and Democratic politician from New Jersey
- Hart T. Mankin, general counsel of the Navy 1971–1973, and judge of the United States Court of Appeals for Veterans Claims 1990–1996
- Travis Randall McDonough, United States district judge, Eastern District of Tennessee
- Patrick Henry Nelson II (1856–1914), South Carolina Fifth Circuit solicitor; president of the South Carolina Bar (1911–1912); member of the South Carolina House of Representatives (1885–1887)
- David C. Norton, United States district judge, District of South Carolina
- Pride Tomlinson (1890–1967), justice of the Tennessee Supreme Court

== Military ==
- Archibald Butt (1865–1912), journalist, military advisor to the president
- William Crawford Gorgas (1854–1920), Surgeon General of the US Army
- Cary T. Grayson (1878–1938), naval surgeon, rear admiral, chairman of the American Red Cross
- Henry Jervey (1866-1942), major general, staff officer during World War I
- Frank Kelso (1933–2013), admiral, USN, chief of Naval Operations (CNO)
- Marcel Lettre, under secretary of Defense for Intelligence, 2015–2017
- Leonidas Polk, Episcopal bishop and Confederate general; founder of the University of the South
- Bill Studeman, admiral, U.S. Navy, director of Naval Intelligence, director of the National Security Agency

== Business ==
- O. B. Grayson Hall Jr., chairman and chief executive officer of Regions Financial Corporation
- Robert Ivy, FAIA, chief executive officer of the American Institute of Architects
- David Tallichet, restaurateur and creator of the themed restaurant
- Merry Ann Thompson Wright, CEO of the American Lung Association of Central New York, 42nd president general of the Daughters of the American Revolution
- Rick Woodward, president of Woodward Iron Company, owner Birmingham Barons

== Politics and government ==
- Robert Stanley Adams (1895–1943), member of the Florida State Senate
- Ellis Arnall, governor of Georgia
- Howard Baker, Republican senator from Tennessee
- Richard Walker Bolling, Democratic congressman from Missouri
- David Cadman, Vancouver city councillor
- Harry P. Cain, Republican senator from Washington, 1946–1953
- William S. Cogswell Jr., member of the South Carolina House of Representatives
- Carl Copeland Cundiff, United States ambassador to Niger
- Steven Dickerson, Republican member of the Tennessee Senate, 2013–2020
- Tucker Eskew, Republican political consultant
- Kirkman Finlay Jr., mayor of Columbia, South Carolina, 1978–1986
- Robert C. Frasure, first U.S. ambassador to Estonia after regaining independence from the Soviet Union
- Robert E. Gribbin, 3rd, United States ambassador to Rwanda 1996–1999, and the Central African Republic 1993–1995
- William Pike Hall Sr., state senator for Caddo and DeSoto parishes, Louisiana, 1924–1932; Shreveport attorney
- Clarke Hogan, Republican member of the Virginia House of Delegates, 2002–2010
- Henry F. Holland, assistant secretary of State for Inter-American Affairs, 1954–1956
- John Jay Hooker (1930–2016), attorney, political gadfly, candidate for Tennessee governor
- Luke Lea, Democratic senator from Tennessee, 1911–1917
- Thomas Channing Moore (1872-1931), member of the New York State Assembly representing Westchester County
- Peter O'Donnell, Republican state party chairman in Texas during the 1960s; Dallas investor and philanthropist
- LeRoy Percy, attorney, planter, and politician; U.S. Senator from Mississippi, 1910–1913
- Vail M. Pittman, 19th governor of Nevada
- Albert J. Pullen, member of the Wisconsin State Senate
- Simon Pierre Robineau, member of the Florida House of Representatives
- Steve Schale, state director for the 2008 Barack Obama campaign in Florida
- Armistead I. Selden Jr., Democratic congressman from Alabama
- Phil Smith (1931–2020), member of the Alabama House of Representatives
- Thomas Porcher Stoney (1889-1973), mayor of Charleston, South Carolina, 1923-31
- Lee M. Thomas, administrator, United States Environmental Protection Agency, 1985–89
- Shannon R. Valentine, member of the Virginia House of Delegates
- John Sharp Williams (1854–1932), minority leader of the United States House of Representatives, U.S. senator from Mississippi, 1911-23

== Religion ==
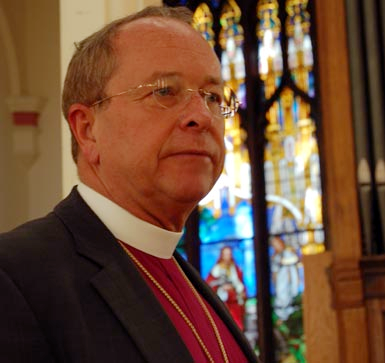
Gene Robinson, ninth bishop of the Diocese of New Hampshire and the first openly gay Episcopal bishop

- J. Neil Alexander, bishop of Atlanta and dean of the School of Theology of the University of the South
- John Maury Allin, 23rd presiding bishop of the Episcopal Church, 1974–1985
- Harry Brown Bainbridge III, bishop of Idaho, president of Province VIII, chair of Episcopal Relief & Development
- Allen L. Bartlett, bishop of Pennsylvania, 1987–1998
- Foley Beach, archbishop of the Anglican Church in North America
- G.P. Mellick Belshaw (1928–2020), bishop of New Jersey
- Jackson Biggers (born 1937), bishop of the Diocese of Northern Malawi
- Mark Bourlakas, bishop of Southwestern Virginia
- Theodore DuBose Bratton, bishop of the Episcopal Church and chaplain general of the United Confederate Veterans
- Edmond Browning, presiding bishop of the Episcopal Church
- William G. Burrill, bishop of Rochester
- Charles Judson Child Jr., bishop of Atlanta
- Thomas N. Carruthers (1900–1960), bishop of South Carolina
- William Stirling Claiborne (1872–1933), priest
- Clarence Alfred Cole (1909–1963), bishop of Upper South Carolina
- Glenda S. Curry, bishop of Alabama
- Carl P. Daw Jr., executive director of the Hymn Society
- Alex D. Dickson, bishop of West Tennessee
- William Porcher DuBose, dean and priest
- James Duncan, bishop of Southeast Florida
- Chip Edgar (born 1964), bishop of South Carolina
- Hunley Elebash (1923–1993), bishop of East Carolina
- Thomas C. Ely, bishop of Vermont, 2001–2019
- James Harold Flye (1884-1985), priest, mentor of writer James Agee
- Leopold Frade, Episcopal bishop
- Thomas F. Gailor, (1856-1935) third bishop of the Episcopal Diocese of Tennessee, 1898-1935
- Robert F. Gibson Jr., bishop of Virginia, 1961–1974
- Campbell Gray, Episcopal bishop
- Duncan M. Gray Jr. (1926–2016), bishop of Mississippi
- Alexander Gregg (1819-1893), first bishop of the Episcopal Diocese of Texas, fifth Chancellor of Sewanee
- Marion J. Hatchett, liturgical scholar and one of the key framers of the 1979 Book of Common Prayer
- John E. Hines, 22nd presiding bishop of the Episcopal Church, 1965–1974
- George Nelson Hunt, III, bishop of Rhode Island
- T. J. Johnston (born 1956), bishop in the Anglican Mission in America
- Edwin M. Leidel Jr., bishop of Eau Claire
- Clark Lowenfield (born 1957), bishop of the Western Gulf Coast
- Mary Adelia Rosamond McLeod, bishop of Vermont, the first female Episcopal priest elected to head a diocese
- C. Brinkley Morton, bishop of San Diego
- Alfred C. Marble Jr. (1936–2017), bishop of Mississippi
- Henry N. Parsley, bishop of Alabama, chancellor of The University of the South
- Leonidas Polk, Episcopal bishop and Confederate general; founder of the University of the South
- Charles Todd Quintard, bishop of Tennessee
- Gretchen Rehberg, bishop of Episcopal Diocese of Spokane
- George Lazenby Reynolds (1927–1991), ninth bishop of Tennessee
- Gene Robinson, bishop of New Hampshire
- Harry W. Shipps, bishop of Georgia
- Becca Stevens, Episcopal priest
- Hudson Stuck, Anglican archdeacon who organized the first ascent of Mount McKinley
- Eugene Sutton, bishop of Maryland
- G. Porter Taylor, bishop of Western North Carolina
- George Townshend (1876–1957), archdeacon of Clonfert, Canon of St Patrick’s Cathedral, Dublin, Hand of the Cause of the Bahá’í Faith
- Reginald Heber Weller (1857–1935), Episcopal priest and bishop active in the ecumenical movement
- Royden Yerkes, professor of theology 1935–1947
