= Duncan Gray =

Duncan Gray may also refer to:

- Duncan Montgomery Gray Sr. (1898–1966), 5th Bishop of Mississippi, consecrated in 1942
- Duncan Montgomery Gray Jr. (1926–2016), 7th Bishop of Mississippi, consecrated in 1974.
- Duncan Montgomery Gray III, 9th Bishop of Mississippi, consecrated in 2000
