= St. Peter's Episcopal Church (Oxford, Mississippi) =

Historic church in Mississippi, United States

- U.S. National Register of Historic Places
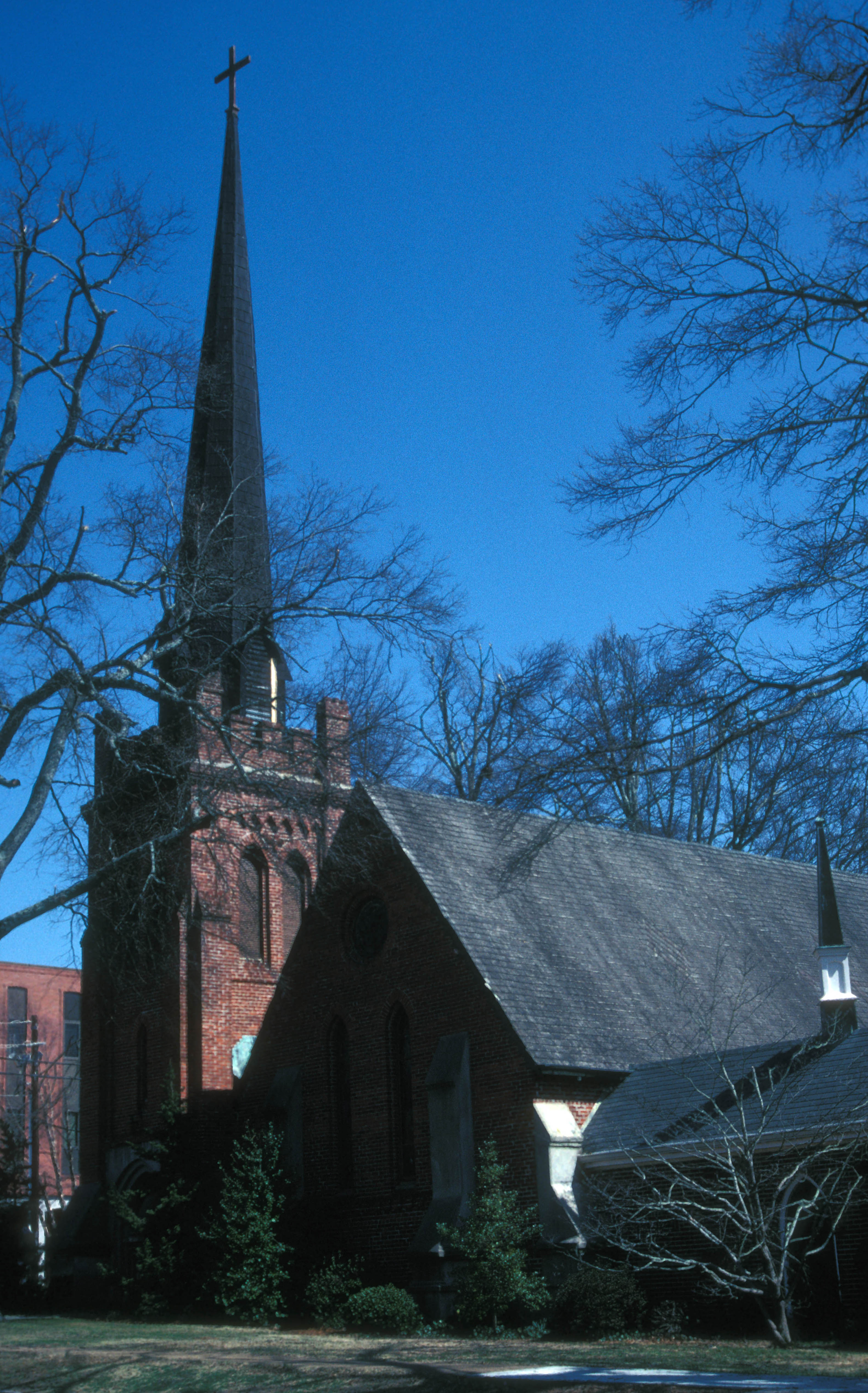

- Location within Mississippi Location within the United States
- Location: 113 S. 9th St., Oxford, Mississippi
- Coordinates: 34°22′0″N 89°31′13″W
- Area: less than one acre
- Built: 1855
- Architect: J.F. Dunlap & Co.
- Architectural style: Gothic, Early English Style
- NRHP reference No.: 75001049
- Added to NRHP: July 24, 1975

St. Peter's Episcopal Church is a parish of the Episcopal Church in Oxford, Mississippi. It is noted for its historic Gothic Revival church building at 113 S. 9th Street, which once served as the pro-cathedral for what is now the Episcopal Diocese of Mississippi.

== History ==
The Episcopal history of the area predates the incorporation of Oxford, with services held periodically throughout the 1840s. In 1848 James Hervey Otey, then provisional Bishop of Mississippi, encouraged the establishment of an Episcopal congregation there, anticipating opportunities from the recent opening of the University of Mississippi.

The church was founded on May 12, 1851, with the election of its vestry and wardens. Noted scholar Rev. Prof. Frederick Augustus Porter Barnard, the first resident cleric, arrived in 1855 and began the work of building a permanent church. Land was offered by John Donelson Martin in 1850, but the lot where the church now stands was purchased in 1855 from Philip and Mary Yancey, with construction beginning that year.

In 1856 Barnard was named chancellor of the university, contributing to the parish's interest in the university community. Construction on the church was completed in 1860, with Barnard delivering the first sermon on Easter that year. Barnard resigned his posts after the outbreak of the American Civil War, however, and staffing and other difficulties relating to the hostilities prevented formal consecration of the church until 1871.

Bishop Coadjutor and later Bishop Hugh Miller Thompson moved into St. Peter's newly constructed original rectory in 1883, leading some to refer to St. Peter's as a cathedral or pro-cathedral, a practice that continued until at least 1889.

Several high-ranking Confederates including Jacob Thompson, Francis A. Shoup, and Albert Taylor Bledsoe were members of the congregation. Nevertheless, then-rector (later bishop) Rev. Duncan M. Gray Jr. strongly supported the 1962 integration of the university, and under his leadership and that of his son, the parish became heavily involved in racial reconciliation efforts.

== Church ==
The church faces west at the corner of E. Jackson Ave. and N. 9th St., three blocks west of the courthouse square. It is not known for certain who served as architect, although parish tradition holds it to be Richard Upjohn, to whose style the church does correspond in plan and detail.

The church was built mainly of finely ornamented local brick on a simple nave plan, with lancet windows between buttresses. The tower in the northwest corner is topped by an octagonal spire added in 1893. It was added to the National Register in 1975.
