= Brian R. Seage =

American bishop

The Right Reverend Brian Richard Seage
- Bishop of Mississippi
- Church: Episcopal Church
- Diocese: Mississippi
- Elected: May 3, 2014
- In office: 2015–2024
- Predecessor: Duncan Montgomery Gray III
- Successor: Dorothy Sanders Wells
- Previous post: Coadjutor Bishop of Mississippi (2014–2015)

Orders
- Ordination: 1998
- Consecration: September 27, 2014 by Katharine Jefferts Schori

Personal details
- Denomination: Anglican
- Spouse: Kyle Dice Seage
- Children: 2
- Education: Pepperdine University

Brian Richard Seage is the tenth, now resigned, bishop of the Episcopal Diocese of Mississippi. He was consecrated on September 27, 2014. He is currently serving as an assisting bishop in Fort Worth, Texas.

== Biography ==
Brian R. Seage was elected on May 3, 2014, at St. Andrew's Cathedral in Jackson on the fifth ballot. He was consecrated as bishop coadjutor on September 27, 2014, and then succeeded Duncan M. Gray III, as the tenth bishop diocesan when Gray retired in February 2015.

Seage was elected as bishop coadjutor during his tenure as rector at St. Columb's in Ridgeland, Mississippi, where he served since 2005. He was also the dean of the Central Convocation of the Diocese of Mississippi where he helped co-ordinate and enable the ministry of Episcopal clergy in central Mississippi.

He holds an undergraduate degree from Pepperdine University and a Master of Divinity degree from the Episcopal Theological Seminary of the Southwest. He has been a priest since 1998.

From 1997 to 1998, Seage served as curate at St. John's, Ocean Springs, and then as rector of St. Thomas Episcopal Church in Diamondhead from 1998 to 2005, growing both attendance and programming in the parish. A successful building program was completed and average Sunday attendance doubled during his ministry at St. Thomas.

Seage was called to St. Columb's in Ridgeland in 2005. St. Columb's attendance and programming grew under his leadership and a large building project was completed.

Before entering the priesthood, Seage served as director of youth ministry for St. Patrick's Episcopal Church in his native Thousand Oaks, California. In this large, program-size church he managed a team of volunteers to support both the junior high and senior high youth groups, assisted with chapel at St. Patrick's Day School, and coordinated the congregation's Habitat for Humanity program.

In the Diocese of Mississippi, Seage served as a Fresh Start facilitator and was on the diocese's executive committee from 2006 through 2009. He was also a member of the diocesan Restructure Task Force.

Seage was a summer camp session director at Camp Bratton-Green from 2006 until 2019. He also served on the Gray Center Board of Managers. While at St. Thomas, he served on the board of trustees for Coast Episcopal School in Long Beach, Mississippi.

Brian is married to Kyle Dice Seage, former rector at St. Philip's in Jackson, MS and current rector at St. Stephen's in Belvedere, California. They are parents to two adult daughters, Katie and Betsy.

Seage publicly announced his plans to resign his position on October 27, 2022. Seage joined his wife in California after the ordination and consecration of the Rt. Rev. Dorothy Sanders Wells, as the eleventh bishop diocesan on July 20, 2024. On November 21, 2024 it was announced that Bishop Seage would join the Episcopal Diocese of Texas as the Assisting Bishop of the North Region, headquartered in Fort Worth.

== See also ==
- List of Episcopal bishops of the United States
- Historical list of the Episcopal bishops of the United States
