= Schale =

Schale is a surname. Notable people with the surname include:

- Steve Schale, American political consultant
- Waltraud Schale, East German slalom canoeist
