= Alex D. Dickson =

American Anglican bishop (1926–2021)

The Right Reverend Alex Dockery Dickson D.D.
- Bishop of West Tennessee
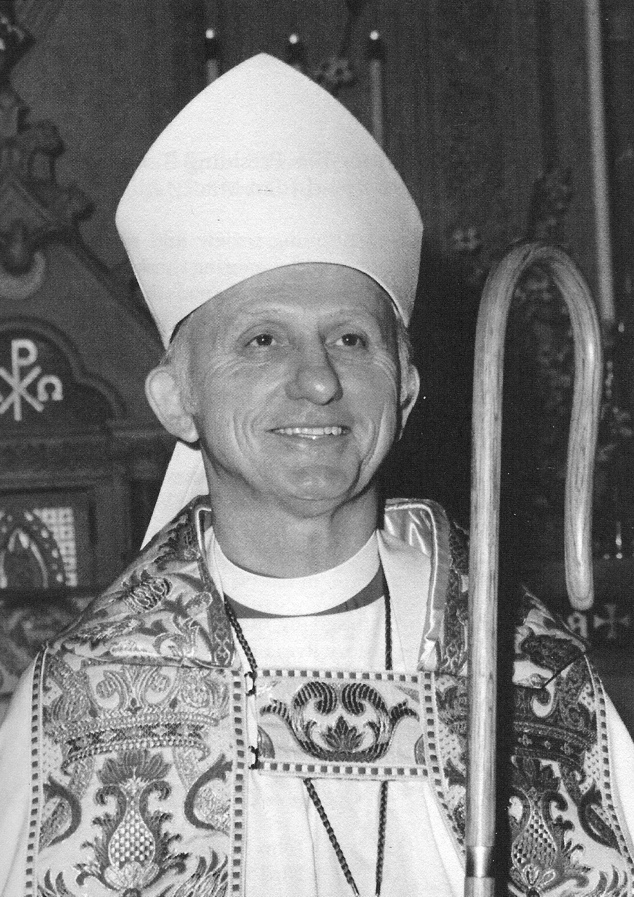
- Dickson at his consecration as a bishop in 1983
- Church: Episcopal Church; Anglican Church in North America
- Diocese: West Tennessee
- Elected: January 22, 1983
- In office: 1983–1994
- Successor: James Malone Coleman

Orders
- Ordination: December 1, 1958 by Duncan Montgomery Gray Sr.
- Consecration: April 9, 1983 by John Allin

Personal details
- Born: September 9, 1926 Alligator, Mississippi, U.S.
- Died: November 14, 2021 (aged 95) Charleston, South Carolina, U.S.
- Denomination: Anglican
- Spouse: Charlotte Nell Perkins (m. 1948; died 1995)
- Children: 3

Alex Dockery Dickson Jr. (September 9, 1926 – November 14, 2021) was an American Anglican bishop. He was first bishop of the Episcopal Diocese of West Tennessee, serving from 1983 to 1994. He was Bishop in Residence in the Anglican Diocese of South Carolina at the Anglican Church in North America in his last years.

== Early life and education ==
Dickson was born on September 9, 1926, in Alligator, Mississippi, the son of Alex Dockery Dickson and Georgie Maude Wicks. He studied at the University of Mississippi and graduated with a Bachelor of Arts in 1949. he then enrolled at the University of the South and earned his Master of Divinity in 1958.

== Ordained ministry ==
Dickson was ordained deacon on May 31, 1958, by Bishop Duncan Montgomery Gray Sr. of Mississippi. He was ordained priest on December 1, 1958, by the same bishop. In 1958, he also became vicar of St Paul's Church in Hollandale, Mississippi. In 1962, he became rector of St Columb's Church in Jackson, Mississippi. Dickson became headmaster of All Saints' Episcopal School in Vicksburg, Mississippi, from 1968 till 1983. He lived on campus with his first wife and family until his resignation. He was instrumental in building student enrolment. The school closed in 2006.

== Bishop ==
On January 22, 1983, Dickson was elected after 33 ballots, as the first Bishop of West Tennessee in St Mary's Cathedral, Memphis, Tennessee. He was consecrated on April 9, 1983, at the Memphis Cook Convention Center, by Presiding Bishop John Allin (Allin was Dickson's ecclesiastical superior in Mississippi for some years). He retired on September 30, 1994.

== Retirement ==
After his retirement, he started doing missionary work in Southeast Asia and Africa. He was a theological conservative critical of the Episcopal Church's departures from traditional Christian teachings on human sexuality. He was involved in the Anglican realignment and participated in the consecration of the first two bishops of the Anglican Mission in the Americas, in 2000. He was Bishop in Residence at St. Michael’s Church, in Charleston, in the Anglican Diocese of South Carolina, member of the Anglican Church in North America, at the time of his death, aged 95 years old.

== Personal life ==
Dickson married Charnelle Perkins on October 7, 1948. Together they had three sons: Alex, Charles, and John. Charnelle died on October 16, 1995. He later married Jane Graham Carver on January 2, 1999. Dickson died on November 14, 2021, at the age of 95. He was predeceased by his son, Alex.

Anglican Communion titles
New title	I Bishop of West Tennessee; 1983–1994	Succeeded by James Malone Coleman
