= Fellowship of Southern Writers =

American literary organization

The Fellowship of Southern Writers is an American literary organization that celebrates the creative vitality of Southern writing as the mirror of a distinctive and cherished regional culture. Its fellowships and awards draw attention to outstanding literary achievement and help to nurture new talent.

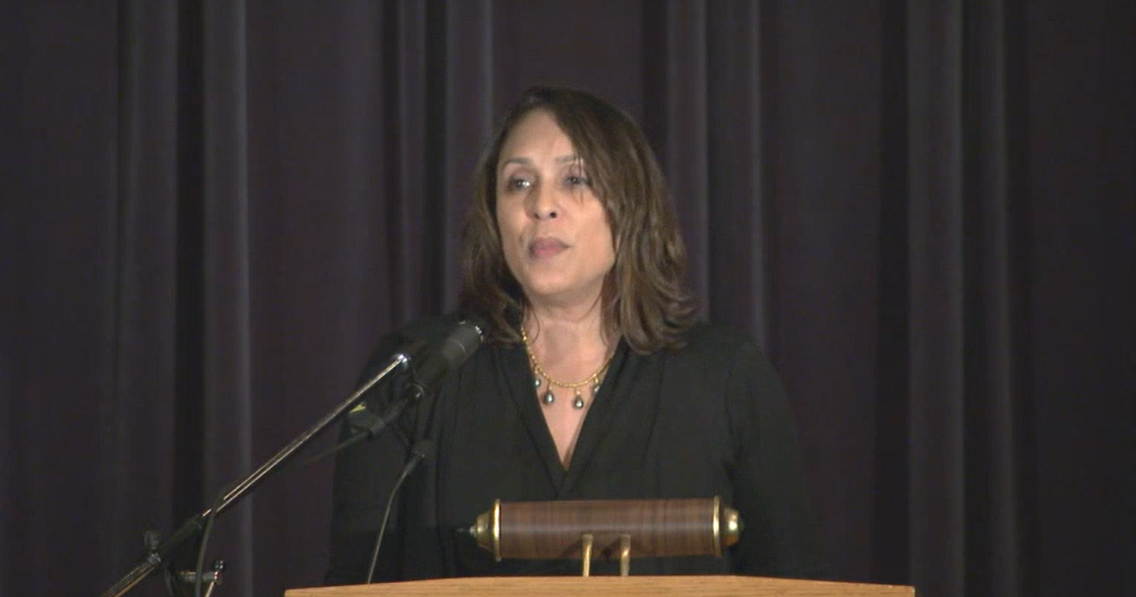
U.S. Poet Laureate Natasha Trethewey introduces a 2013 event celebrating the Fellowship of Southern Writers at the Library of Congress.

The fellowship was founded in 1987 in Chattanooga, Tennessee by 21 Southern writers and other literary luminaries. The group meets in every odd-numbered year, usually during the SouthWord Literature Festival hosted by the Southern Lit Alliance in Chattanooga, TN.

== Charter members ==
- A.R. Ammons
- Cleanth Brooks
- Fred Chappell
- George Core
- James Dickey
- Ralph Ellison
- Horton Foote
- Shelby Foote
- John Hope Franklin
- Ernest J. Gaines
- George Garrett
- Blyden Jackson
- Madison Jones
- Andrew Nelson Lytle
- Walker Percy
- Reynolds Price
- Louis D. Rubin, Jr.
- Mary Lee Settle
- Lewis P. Simpson
- Elizabeth Spencer
- William Styron
- Walter Sullivan
- Peter Taylor
- Robert Penn Warren
- Eudora Welty
- C. Vann Woodward

== Elected members ==
- Wendell Berry (1990)
- Ellen Douglas (Josephine Haxton) (1990)
- C. Eric Lincoln (1990)
- Romulus Linney (1990)
- Lee Smith (1993)
- Monroe Spears (1993)
- Charles Wright (1993)
- Doris Betts (1995)
- Marsha Norman (1995)
- James Applewhite (1997)
- Richard Bausch (1997)
- Clyde Edgerton (1997)
- Gail Godwin (1997)
- William Hoffman (1997)
- Donald Justice (1997)
- Dave Smith (1997)
- Joseph Blotner (2001)
- Allan Gurganus (2001)
- Beth Henley (2001)
- Josephine Humphreys (2001)
- Bobbie Ann Mason (2001)
- Henry Taylor (2001)
- Madison Smartt Bell (2003)
- Kaye Gibbons (2003)
- Barry Hannah (2003)
- Yusef Komunyakaa (2003)
- Jill McCorkle (2003)
- John Shelton Reed (2003)
- Ellen Bryant Voigt (2003)
- Allen Wier (2003)
- Larry Brown (2005)
- Percival Everett (2005)
- Robert Morgan (2005)
- Lewis Nordan (2005)
- Sam Pickering (2005)
- Wyatt Prunty (2005)
- Dorothy Allison (2007)
- Roy Blount, Jr. (2007)
- Andrew Hudgins (2007)
- Randall Kenan (2007)
- Shannon Ravenel (2007)
- Alfred Uhry (2007)
- Will D. Campbell (2009)
- Rita Dove (2009)
- Percival Everett (2009)
- Jim Grimsley (2009)
- Edward P. Jones (2009)
- Fred Hobson (2009)
- Rodney Jones (2009)
- Eleanor Ross Taylor (2009)
- Natasha Trethewey (2009)
- Al Young (2009)
- Tony Earley (2010)
- Claudia Emerson (2011)
- George Singleton (2013)
- Maurice Manning (2013)
- Tayari Jones (2014)
- Steve Yarbrough (2015)
- Silas House (2017)

== Awards and honors ==
- The Hillsdale Prize for Fiction
- The Hanes Prize for Poetry
- The Robert Penn Warren Award for Fiction
- The Bryan Family Foundation Award for Drama
- The Cecil Woods, Jr. Prize for Non-Fiction
- The Fellowship's New Writing Award for Fiction
- The C. Vann Woodward-John Hope Franklin Prize for the Writing of Southern History
- The James Still Award for Writing About the Appalachian South
- The Fellowship's New Award for Poetry
- The Cleanth Brooks Medal for Distinguished Achievement in Southern Letters

== See also ==
- American Literature
- Southern literature
- Southern United States
