= William Mercer Green (grandson) =

American Episcopal bishop (1876–1942)

The Right Reverend William Mercer Green D.D.
- Bishop of Mississippi
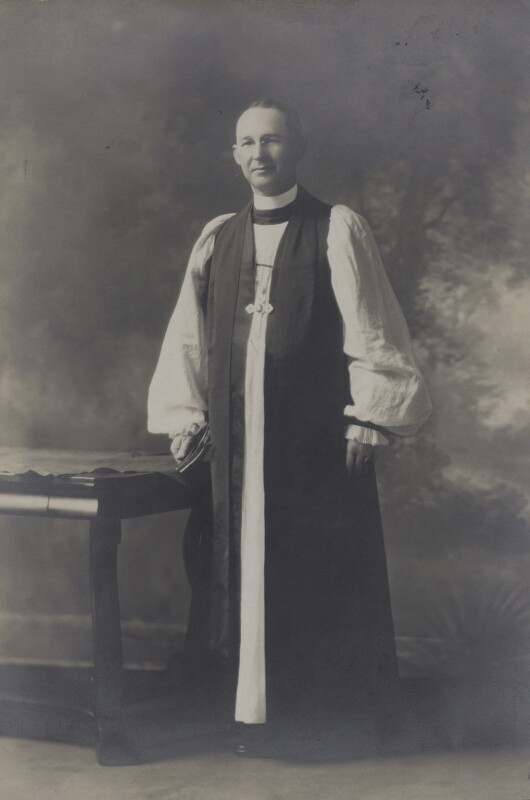
- Church: Episcopal Church
- Diocese: Mississippi
- In office: 1938–1942
- Predecessor: Theodore DuBose Bratton
- Successor: Duncan Montgomery Gray Sr.
- Previous post: Coadjutor Bishop of Mississippi (1919-1938)

Orders
- Ordination: December 9, 1900 by Hugh Miller Thompson
- Consecration: May 20, 1919 by Daniel S. Tuttle

Personal details
- Born: July 12, 1876 Greenville, Mississippi, United States
- Died: November 12, 1942 (aged 66) Columbus, Mississippi, United States
- Buried: Greenwood Cemetery (Jackson, Mississippi)
- Denomination: Anglican
- Parents: Duncan Cameron Green & Arabella Bott
- Spouse: Pauline Leila Priestly
- Children: 3
- Education: Sewanee: The University of the South

William Mercer Green (July 12, 1876 – November 12, 1942), was the 4th Bishop of Mississippi from 1938 till 1942. He was the grandson of William Mercer Green, the 1st Bishop of Mississippi.

== Education ==
Green attended the public schools of Greenville, Mississippi. Later he studied theology and graduated from Sewanee: The University of the South. He received and honorar Doctor of Divinity degree from the same university.

== Priest ==
In 1899 Green was ordained deacon and priest a year later. Most of his priesthood was spent as rector of parishes around Mississippi. He also served as rector of St John's Church in Knoxville, Tennessee. He was also Dean of All Saints College in Vicksburg, Mississippi. His last post prior to episcopal election was as rector of St Andrew's Church in Jackson, Mississippi.

== Bishop ==
In 1919 Green was elected Coadjutor Bishop of Mississippi. He succeeded Bishop Theodore DuBose Bratton as diocesan bishop upon his retirement in 1938. His episcopacy was mostly focused on rural work in the diocese. Green died in office on November 12, 1942. His funeral was held on November 16 and was presided over by R. Bland Mitchell, Bishop of Arkansas.
