= Allen Wier =

American novelist (1946–2021)

- Born: September 9, 1946; San Antonio, Texas, U.S.
- Died: December 4, 2021 (aged 75)
- Education: Baylor University (BA); Louisiana State University (MA); Bowling Green University (MFA)
- Occupations: Writer; professor
- Spouse(s): Dara Wier; Donnie Wier
- Children: 1 biological, 2 stepchildren
- Writing career
- Notable awards: Dos Passos Prize (2008)

Allen Wier (September 9, 1946 – December 4, 2021; pronounced "wire"), was an American writer and a professor. He was the Watkins Endowed Visiting Writer at Murray State University from 2016 until 2020; he is professor emeritus having taught at the University of Tennessee from 1994 until 2015, and the University of Alabama from 1980 to 1994. and Hollins College from 1975 to 1980 and Carnegie Mellon University from 1974 to 1975. He taught in the University of New Orleans summer writing workshop in Edinburgh, Scotland in Summer of 2013. He was visiting writer at the University of Texas in 1983 and at Florida International University from 1984 1985.

== Biography ==
Wier was born on September 9, 1946, in San Antonio, Texas, and spent parts of his childhood in Louisiana and Mexico. He attended Baylor University and received his BA degree (1968); Louisiana State University and received his MA degree (1971); and Bowling Green University received his MFA degree (1974).

He taught at the University of Tennessee from 1994 until 2015, and the University of Alabama from 1980 to 1994. Additionally teaching at Longwood College, Carnegie Mellon University, Hollins College, University of Texas, Florida International University, and Murray State University.

In 2003, Wier was inducted into the Fellowship of Southern Writers, along with Barry Hannah and Yusef Komunyakaa. He is widely published in anthologies and periodicals, including The New York Times, Ploughshares, and The Southern Review. Was formerly married to the poet Dara Wier. Then married artist Donnie Wier, with whom he became a step-father of two sons Heath and Mike, then had his first and only son, Wes.

== Awards and honors ==
2021, awarded the Truman Capote Prize for Short Fiction

- 2008, awarded the 27th John Dos Passos Prize for Literature
- 2005, special mention for his short story "The Taste of Dirt" in the Pushcart Prize volume 2005
- 2003, inducted into the Fellowship of Southern Writers
- 1997, Robert Penn Warren Award for Fiction, Fellowship of Southern Writers
- 1990, Dobie-Paisano Fellowship, University of Texas and Texas Institute of Letters
- 1978, fiction fellowship, Breadloaf Conference
- 1978, short fiction award, Texas Institute of Letters Award
- 1979, fiction award, Guggenheim Fellow, John Simon Guggenheim Memorial Foundation
- 1974–1975, National Endowment for the Arts Fellowship

== Bibliography ==
=== Books ===
- Wier, Allen (1978). Blanco. Louisiana State University (LSU) Press. ISBN 9780807104736.
- Wier, Allen (1978). Things About to Disappear: Stories. Louisiana State University (LSU) Press. ISBN 9780807104712.
- Wier, Allen (1983). Departing as Air: A Novel. Simon and Schuster. ISBN 9780671433079.
- Wier, Allen (1989). A Place for Outlaws. Harper & Row. ISBN 9780060161132.
- Wier, Allen (2006). Tehano: A Novel. Southern Methodist University Press. ISBN 9780870745065.
- Wier, Allen (2017). Late Night, Early Morning: Stories, University of Tennessee Press. ISBN 978-1-62190-332-1

=== Other publications ===
- Wier, Allen, ed. (1996). Walking on Water and Other Stories. University of Alabama Press. ISBN 9780817307851.
- Wier, Allen; Hendrie, Don, eds. (1985). Voicelust: Eight Contemporary Fiction Writers on Style. Alabama Symposium on English and American Literature. 10, 1983, Tuscaloosa, Alabama. University of Nebraska Press. ISBN 9780803223332.
