= Don Edward Johnson =

American bishop of the Episcopal Church (born 1949)

The Right Reverend Don Edward Johnson
- Bishop of West Tennessee
- Church: Episcopal Church
- Diocese: West Tennessee
- Elected: March 30, 2001
- In office: 2001–2019
- Predecessor: James Malone Coleman
- Successor: Phoebe Alison Roaf

Orders
- Ordination: 1977
- Consecration: June 30, 2001 by Frank Griswold

Personal details
- Born: 1949 (age 76–77) Nashville, Tennessee, United States
- Denomination: Anglican (prev. Baptist)
- Spouse: Jeannie Avery
- Children: 2
- Education: Vanderbilt University

Don Edward Johnson (born 1949) is an American bishop of the Episcopal Church who served as the third Bishop of West Tennessee from 2001 until 2019.

Johnson was born in 1949 and was raised as a Southern Baptist. He served in the United States Navy as an enlisted man, before studying at Vanderbilt University, from where he graduated with a Bachelor of Arts in 1972. He then studied at the Seabury-Western Theological Seminary and earned his Master of Divinity in 1976. He was awarded a Doctor of Ministry from the Graduate Theological Foundation in 1988. The University of the South and Seabury-Western Theological Seminary both awarded Johnson a Doctor of Divinity in 2002.

Johnson was ordained deacon in 1976 and priest in 1977 in the Episcopal Church. Between 1976 and 1977, he served at Calvary Church in Memphis, Tennessee, before becoming chaplain at the University of Tennessee at Chattanooga and rector of Christ Church in Chattanooga, Tennessee, in 1978. In 1986, he became rector of St. John's Church in Johnson City, Tennessee. In 1996, he moved to Franklin, Tennessee, to become rector of the Church of the Resurrection.

On March 30, 2001, after a process that took seven hours, Johnson was elected on the 15th ballot as the third Bishop of West Tennessee. He was consecrated and installed on June 30, 2001, by Presiding Bishop Frank Griswold, at the Mississippi Boulevard Christian Church in Memphis, Tennessee, used because of its large facilities, something no Memphis-area Episcopal parish had. In 2017, Johnson announced plans to resign his post, which took effect in 2019.
