= W.L. Stevens =

American architect

Colonel W.L. Stevens was an architect based in New Orleans, Louisiana.

A number of his works are listed on the National Register of Historic Places.

Stevens was "prominent" in the Spanish–American War and served as Louisiana's Adjutant-General.

Works include:

- St. James Episcopal Church (1889–95), 208 N. 4th St. Baton Rouge, Louisiana. NRHP-listed.
- Morehouse Parish Courthouse (1914), 125 E. Madison Bastrop, Louisiana. NRHP-listed.
- Commercial Building (1915), 3rd and Johnston Sts. Alexandria, Louisiana, a seven-story skyscraper. NRHP-listed.
