= Alfred C. Marble Jr. =

The Right Reverend Alfred Clark Marble B.D.
- Bishop of Mississippi
- Church: Episcopal Church
- Diocese: Mississippi
- Elected: February 23, 1991
- In office: 1993–2003
- Predecessor: Duncan M. Gray Jr.
- Successor: Duncan Montgomery Gray III
- Other post: Assisting Bishop of North Carolina (2005-2013)
- Previous post: Coadjutor Bishop of Mississippi (1991–1993)

Orders
- Ordination: 1968 by John Allin
- Consecration: June 15, 1991 by John Allin

Personal details
- Born: April 4, 1936 Oneonta, New York, United States
- Died: March 30, 2017 (aged 80) Greensboro, North Carolina, United States
- Denomination: Anglican
- Parents: Alfred Clark Marble & Charlotte Elizabeth Humbarger
- Spouse: Diene Harper
- Children: 2
- Education: University of Mississippi
- Alma mater: Sewanee: The University of the South

Alfred Clark Marble Jr. (known as "Chip"; April 4, 1936 – March 30, 2017) was the Bishop of Mississippi from 1993 to 2003 and the Assisting Bishop of North Carolina between 2005 and 2013 in the Episcopal Church.

== Biography ==
Marble was born on April 4, 1936, in Oneonta, New York, to Alfred Clark Marble and Charlotte Elizabeth Humbarger. He studied at the University of Mississippi, the University of the South's School of Theology, and the University of Edinburgh. He was ordained deacon on June 22, 1967, and was appointed as a curate at St James’ Church in Jackson, Mississippi. After his ordination to the priesthood in 1968, he served at St Timothy's Church in Southaven, Mississippi, Holy Cross Church in Olive Branch, Mississippi, St Peter's Church in Oxford, Mississippi and chaplain in the University of Mississippi and at the Church of the Nativity in Water Valley, Mississippi.

In 1991, Marble was elected Coadjutor Bishop of Mississippi. He was consecrated on June 15, 1991, at the Municipal Auditorium in Jackson, Mississippi. He succeeded as diocesan bishop on September 18, 1993. During his time in Mississippi he was involved in bringing about racial reconciliation, efforts in working with the poor, immigrants, LGBT persons, and those who are disenfranchised or ignored, for which he was awarded the Bishop's Medal at the 198th Annual Convention. After his retirement from Mississippi in 2003, he served as assisting bishop in the Episcopal Diocese of North Carolina. During his time in North Carolina, he was involved in setting up the Greensboro Truth and Reconciliation Commission. He died on March 29, 2017.
