= James Malone Coleman =

American Episcopal Bishop (1929–2020)

The Right Reverend James Malone Coleman
- Bishop of West Tennessee
- Church: Episcopal Church
- Diocese: West Tennessee
- Elected: June 19, 1993
- In office: 1994–2001
- Predecessor: Alex D. Dickson
- Successor: Don Edward Johnson
- Previous post: Coadjutor Bishop of West Tennessee (1993-1994)

Orders
- Ordination: May 6, 1957 by John Vander Horst
- Consecration: November 13, 1993 by Edmond L. Browning

Personal details
- Born: August 26, 1929 Memphis, Tennessee, U.S.
- Died: May 4, 2020 (aged 90) Baton Rouge, Louisiana, U.S.
- Denomination: Anglican
- Parents: Frederick L. Coleman Sr., Doris Cloar Jacobs
- Spouse: Mary Carter Hughes (m. 1959; d. 2004); Emily Douglass Stewart (m. 2005)
- Children: Frederick James Coleman, Finley Carter Coleman, Jonathan Dorris Cloar Coleman

James Malone Coleman (August 26, 1929 – May 4, 2020) was second bishop of the Episcopal Diocese of West Tennessee. Coleman was the first bishop of any Tennessee diocese to be born inside the state itself.

== Early life and education ==
Coleman was born on August 26, 1929, in Memphis, Tennessee, the son of Frederick L. Coleman Sr. and Doris Cloar Jacobs. He was educated at the Christian Brothers High School (a Roman Catholic institution) and graduated in 1947. He then served in the United States Army before he continued his studies at the University of Tennessee, from where he graduated with a Bachelors of Science in 1953. He also graduated with a Master of Divinity from the University of the South in 1956. He received a Certificate in Pastoral Care from the Wake Forest Baptist Medical Center in 1974, and a Doctor of Ministry in pastoral theology from Wake Forest University in 1975.

== Ordained ministry ==
Coleman was ordained deacon on July 3, 1956, by Bishop Theodore N. Barth of Tennessee, at St Mary's Cathedral, Memphis, Tennessee. He then served as deacon at St. Mary's Cathedral until he was ordained priest on May 6, 1957, by Bishop John Vander Horst, then suffragan (later diocesan) of Tennessee. Between 1957 and 1960, he served as priest-in-charge of the Church of Our Saviour in Gallatin, Tennessee, and the Church of the Epiphany in Lebanon, Tennessee, both near Nashville. In 1960 he became chaplain to Episcopal students at Georgia Tech and Agnes Scott College, both in the metropolitan Atlanta area. He remained there till 1962, when he accepted the post of rector of the Church of the Good Shepherd in Knoxville, Tennessee, and rector of St. John's Church in Johnson City, Tennessee. In 1972 he became rector of Christ Church in Martinsville, Virginia, and in 1975 transferred to Baton Rouge, Louisiana to serve as rector of St. James' Church. Between 1989 and 1993, Coleman served as rector of St. John's Church in Memphis, Tennessee.

== Bishop ==
Coleman was elected to be the Coadjutor Bishop of West Tennessee on June 19, 1993, on the 11th ballot, during a special diocesan convention. He was consecrated on November 13, 1993, with Presiding Bishop Edmond L. Browning as chief consecrator at the Mississippi Boulevard Christian Church in Memphis, Tennessee, used because of its large facilities, something no Memphis-area Episcopal parish had. He was installed as the second bishop of the diocese on October 20, 1994, at St Mary's Cathedral. As bishop, Coleman worked to foster reconciliation and growth in the diocese. He was also responsible for reinstating college chaplaincies in the diocese, and founded a training center for the Catechesis of the Good Shepherd, an interdenominational Montessori-based Christian education program at St. Mary's Cathedral. He retired in June 2001.

In 2005, Coleman returned to Baton Rouge and St. James' Church, where he served as bishop-in-residence (an honorary title) until his death in 2020. Following his death, the St. James Episcopal Church Vestry voted to adopt a resolution renaming the Parish Hall Parlor the Coleman Hall in honor of his legacy of transformational leadership. In doing so, they noted that the space stands at the heart of the congregation's communal life together, making it fitting to rename it after a rector who helped build up the St. James community.
