= St. Alban's Episcopal Church (Bovina, Mississippi) =

Coordinates: 32.349723°N 90.740779°W

Saint Alban's Episcopal Church
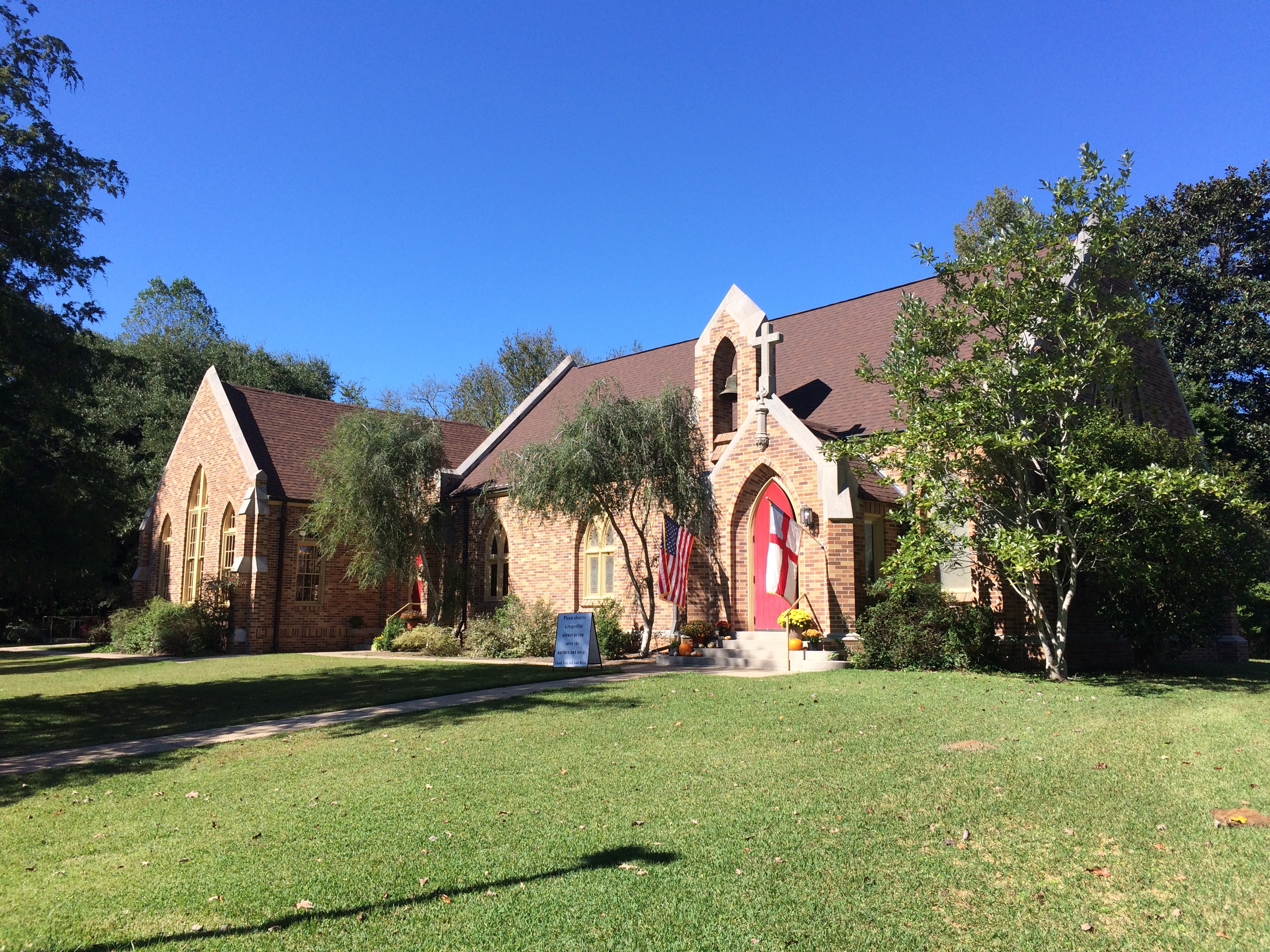
- Saint Alban's Episcopal Church
- Location: Bovina, Mississippi
- Country: United States
- Denomination: Episcopal
- Website: St. Alban's Episcopal Church

History
- Status: Parish
- Founded: 29 November 1857
- Consecrated: 5 May 1859

Architecture
- Functional status: Active
- Architectural type: Neo-Gothic

Administration
- Province: Province IV
- Diocese: Episcopal Diocese of Mississippi

Clergy
- Rector: Reverend Elisabeth Malphurs, Priest-in-Charge

St. Alban’s Episcopal Church is an Episcopal church and cemetery located in Bovina, Mississippi. It was formed by cotton farmers along the Big Black River in 1857. The church was requisitioned as a hospital by Union forces during the American Civil War in May 1863. It was left in ruin by the Union forces, but eventually rebuilt with assistance from St. Alban's Episcopal Church in New York. St. Alban’s continues to hold services as an active parish, located in the country on Warriors Trail between Vicksburg and Jackson.

== History ==
=== Formation ===
St. Alban's was first organized as a parish in 1857 by a group of cotton farmers along the Big Black River. The first service was held in the Baptist church at Mt. Alban, just west of Bovina in the fall of 1857. Articles of Association were adopted by seventeen men and women of the area to form St. Alban's. A vestry was elected, and Henry Sanson, D.D., was asked to serve as rector.

On June 18, 1858, the vestry and congregation voted to erect a church southwest of the train depot in Bovina. Land near the tracks were deeded to the church by Mr. and Mrs. Peterson Bass September 23, 1858. The Rt. Rev. William M. Green, Bishop of Mississippi, consecrated the church now known as St. Alban's on May 5, 1859.

=== American Civil War ===
The early years of the American Civil War were felt by St. Albans church as it lost members of its congregation to the military. Thomas V. Noland formed the Warren Volunteers June 1, 1861. Thirteen of the eighty-two soldiers had ties to St. Albans Church. The company initially deployed to Corinth, then Virginia. The Warren Volunteers served in the Battle of Malvern Hill and the Battle of Sharpsburg.

Just prior to the Siege of Vicksburg, Bovina was filled with soldiers and refugees retreating to Vicksburg after the Battle of Jackson. On May 17, 1863, Union forces broke the defenses of the Confederates at the Battle of Big Black River Bridge and reached Bovina. General Grant left soldiers to guard the Big Black crossing. St. Albans church was then occupied by the 49th Illinois Infantry Regiment. Union Captain John A. Ritter set up a hospital at the church. By the fall of 1863, St. Albans church had been completely demolished, except for some glass from the windows and the corner stone.

=== Post war years ===
After the American Civil War, efforts were started to rebuild the church with the assistance of St. Alban's Church in New York. A new church building built of plain plank, was constructed on the grounds of the original church. The new building was consecrated on February 27, 1880.

=== 20th century ===
Regular worship services were held in the frame building until 1928. In 1928, a new Gothic style church was built retaining the 1870 church as the parish hall. The money for the new church was bequeathed by Matilda Townsend Palmer in 1927. The new church was consecrated on October 20, 1929 with Bishop Theodore Bratton officiating. In 1976, a rectory was built just east of the church.

== See also ==
- Saint Alban
- St. Alban's Episcopal Church (Staten Island, New York)
- Episcopal Diocese of Mississippi
- Province 4 of the Episcopal Church in the United States of America
- Anglican Communion
