= Duncan Montgomery Gray Sr. =

American bishop

The Right Reverend Duncan Montgomery Gray D.D.
- Bishop of Mississippi
- Church: Episcopal Church
- Diocese: Mississippi
- Elected: January 20, 1943
- In office: 1943–1966
- Predecessor: William Mercer Green
- Successor: John Allin

Orders
- Ordination: June 21, 1926 by Theodore DuBose Bratton
- Consecration: May 12, 1943 by Henry St. George Tucker

Personal details
- Born: May 5, 1898 Meridian, Mississippi, United States
- Died: June 25, 1966 (aged 68)
- Buried: Lakewood Memorial Park, Jackson, Mississippi
- Denomination: Anglican
- Parents: William Franklin Gray & Annie L. McClung
- Spouse: Isabel Denham McCrady
- Children: 3
- Education: Sewanee: The University of the South

Duncan Montgomery Gray Sr. (May 5, 1898 – June 25, 1966) was the fifth bishop of Mississippi in The Episcopal Church. His son Duncan Montgomery Gray Jr and grandson Duncan Montgomery Gray III were the seventh and ninth bishops of Mississippi.

== Early life and education ==
Gray was born on May 5, 1898, in Meridian, Mississippi, the son of William Franklin Gray and Annie McClung. He attended the Rice Institute in Hudson, Texas and later Sewanee: The University of the South.

== Priest ==
Gray was ordained deacon on June 21, 1925, by Bishop Theodore DuBose Bratton. He served as deacon in Grace Church, Rosedale, Mississippi and Calvary Mission in Cleveland, Mississippi. He was ordained priest on June 21, 1926, after which he served as rector of Grace Church in Canton, Mississippi. He also served as rector in Nativity Church in Greenwood, Mississippi and St Paul's Church in Columbus, Mississippi. He was also a member of the Diocesan executive committee.

== Bishop ==
Gray was elected, on the third ballot, bishop on January 20, 1943, during the 116th diocesan convention. He was consecrated on May 12, 1943, with Presiding Bishop Henry St. George Tucker as chief consecrator in St Andrew's church in Jackson, Mississippi. As bishop he managed to keep the church growth in the diocese steady and increased the diocesan budget. He was also the first bishop to be installed in the diocesan cathedral after its establishment. He was also instrumental in promoting racial integration. Gray retired on May 31, 1966, and died a less than a month later on June 25. His funeral took place on June 27 in St Andrew's Cathedral, with the Bishop of Mississippi, John Allin presiding.

== Personal life ==
Gray married Isabel McCrady, who died on May 31, 1966, a few weeks before Bishop Gray. Together they had 3 children including Duncan M. Gray Jr. who later became Bishop of Mississippi.
