= St. James Episcopal Church (Baton Rouge, Louisiana) =

Historic church in Louisiana, United States

- U.S. National Register of Historic Places
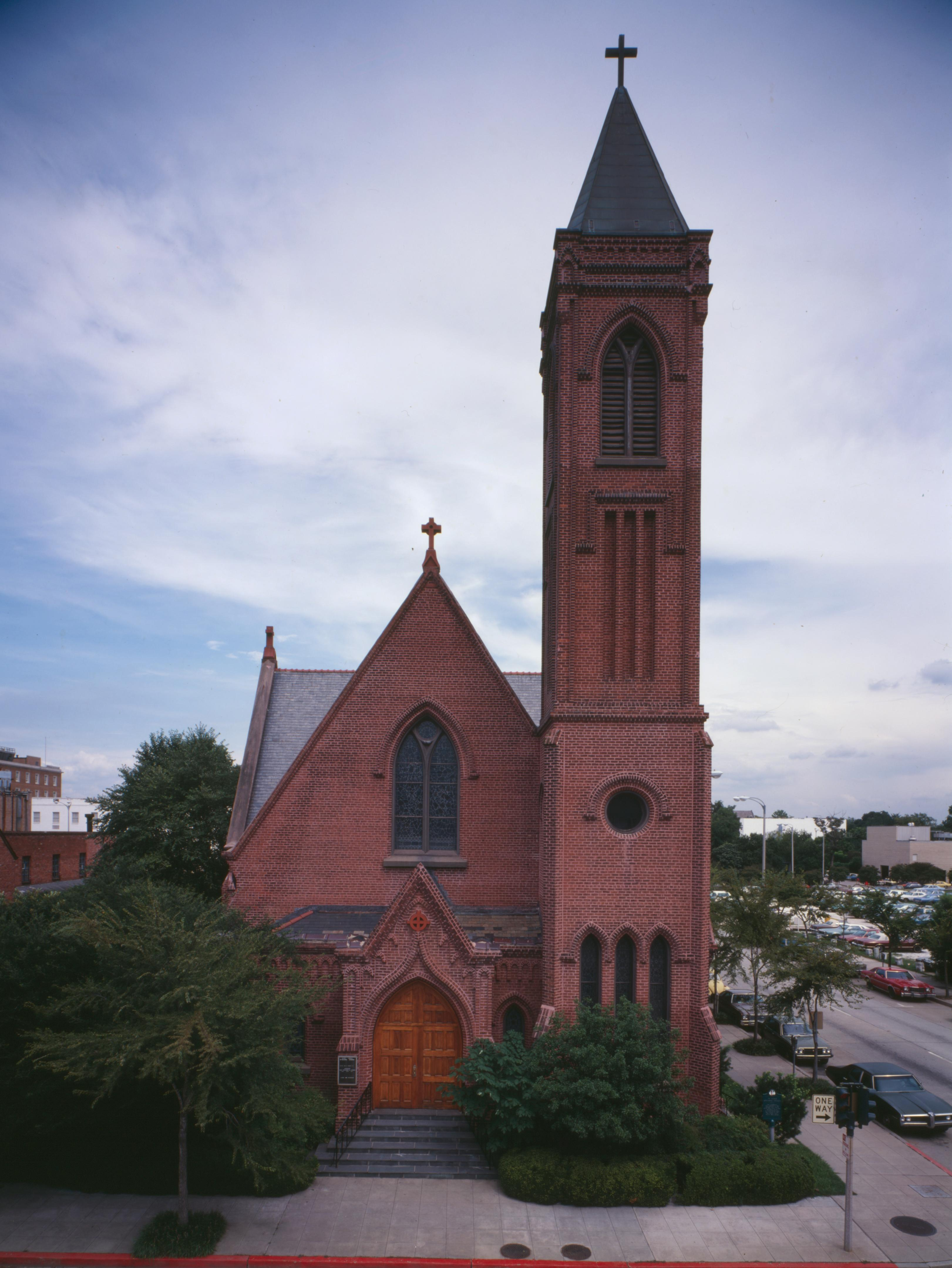

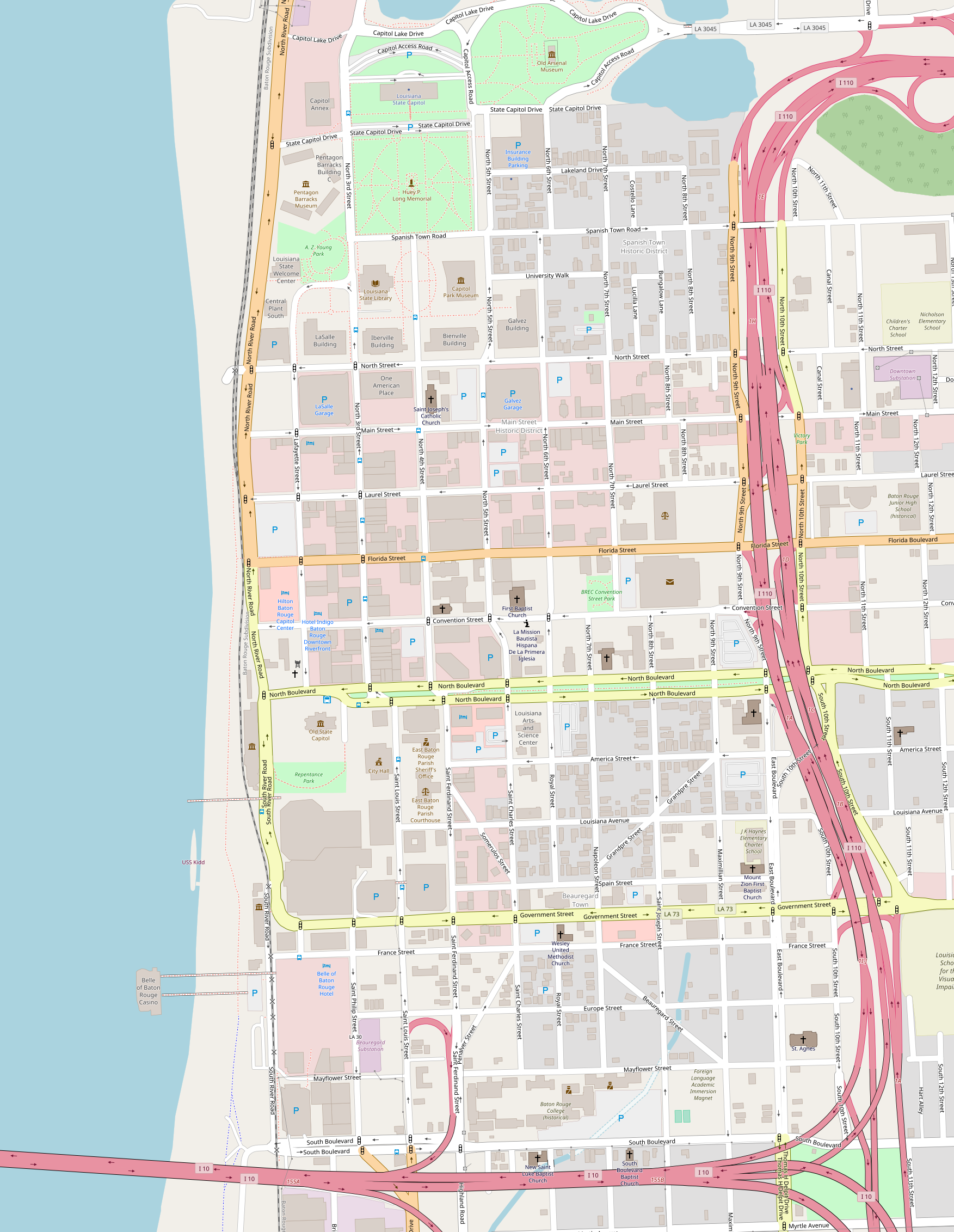
- Location within Baton Rouge Downtown
- Location: 208 North 4th Street, Baton Rouge, Louisiana
- Coordinates: 30°26′55″N 91°11′12″W
- Area: less than one acre
- Built: 1889-1895
- Built by: W.H. Miller
- Architect: Col. W.L. Stevens
- Architectural style: Gothic Revival
- NRHP reference No.: 78001423
- Added to NRHP: May 5, 1978

The St. James Episcopal Church, located in downtown Baton Rouge, Louisiana, is a congregation of the Episcopal Diocese of Louisiana. Although Episcopalians began gathering in 1819, St. James Church formally organized as an Episcopal congregation in 1844 due to the influence and support of Margaret MacKall Taylor, wife of president Zachary Taylor. Within the spectrum of worship styles in the Anglican tradition, St. James Church was a Low Church parish during the 19th century, but has been considered a Broad Church parish since the early to mid 20th Century. In addition to worship, St. James Church is actively involved in service to the community, pastoral care, and Christian education for all ages. The church is also home to a two-time National Blue Ribbon day school (18 month through 5th grade).

== History ==
In 1819, a small group of Episcopalians with no rector and no regular place for worship formed the nucleus of what was to become St. James Episcopal Church. The Episcopal Congregation of Baton Rouge, Louisiana existed under a charter but without a priest from 1820 until 1830. Mrs. Zachary Taylor, wife of the twelfth President of the United States, gathered this group of Episcopalians together in 1843, and by 1844, the parish received its charter of incorporation from the Louisiana legislature.

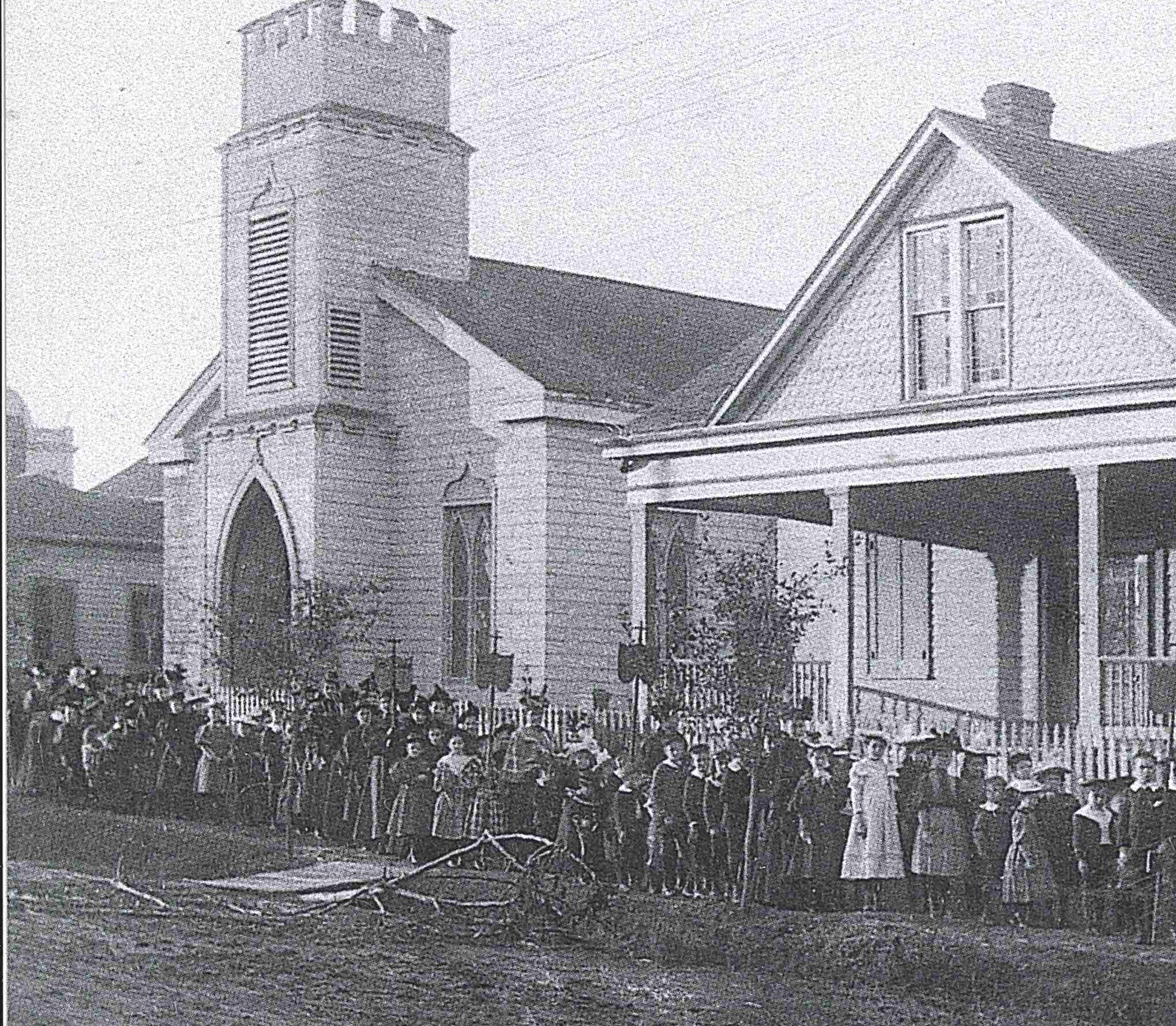
Children gathered in front of original church building.

The original church building was consecrated by the Rt. Rev. Leonidas Polk that same year and went on to survive tornadoes, yellow fever, the Battle of Baton Rouge, post-Civil War occupation, and Reconstruction. By the spring of 1895, St. James had begun construction of a new building, which remains the church we know and love today. The first services in the new St. James Episcopal Church were conducted on June 21, 1896.

Throughout its history, St. James Episcopal Church has started, sustained and supported new ministries. Almost every other Episcopal parish, mission and diocesan institution in Baton Rouge can trace its origins to the nurture and support of St. James Church. In addition to the founding of several other Episcopal parishes in Baton Rouge, St. James has been involved in K-12 education. St. James Episcopal Day School, founded in 1948 as a kindergarten by Doris deBessonet, provides a church-based education to children 18 months old through 5th. Episcopal High School of Baton Rouge was established by St. James in 1965 as a diocesan owned extension of the Day School for middle and high school students.

In 1983, St. James provided seed capital and initial manpower to help establish St. James Place, Baton Rouge's first total life-care retirement community. In 1986, the clergy of St. James also played an important role the formation of what would become the Interfaith Federation of Greater Baton Rouge. Today, St. James Church includes an active community of clergy, lay leadership, and volunteers working cooperatively to provide spiritual, educational, social, and service ministries to the Baton Rouge area.

== Architecture and Art ==
The Gothic Revival-style church building, completed in 1896, was designed by architect Colonel W.L. Stevens. It replaced the original wood-frame church building which had been built in 1845–46. The 1896 church was listed on the National Register of Historic Places in 1978. It was then the second oldest Gothic Revival church in the city of Baton Rouge. Its NRHP nomination describes: "Because of its side tower and substantial proportions, it is closer in feeling to the ecclesiastical, mid-century Gothic Revival style than the older church, St. Joseph's..." The exterior of the cruciform church is constructed of locally made, soft pink brick and brownstone with terracotta decorations. The cypress and pine interior is distinguished by its Hammerbeam roof with mahogany ceiling.

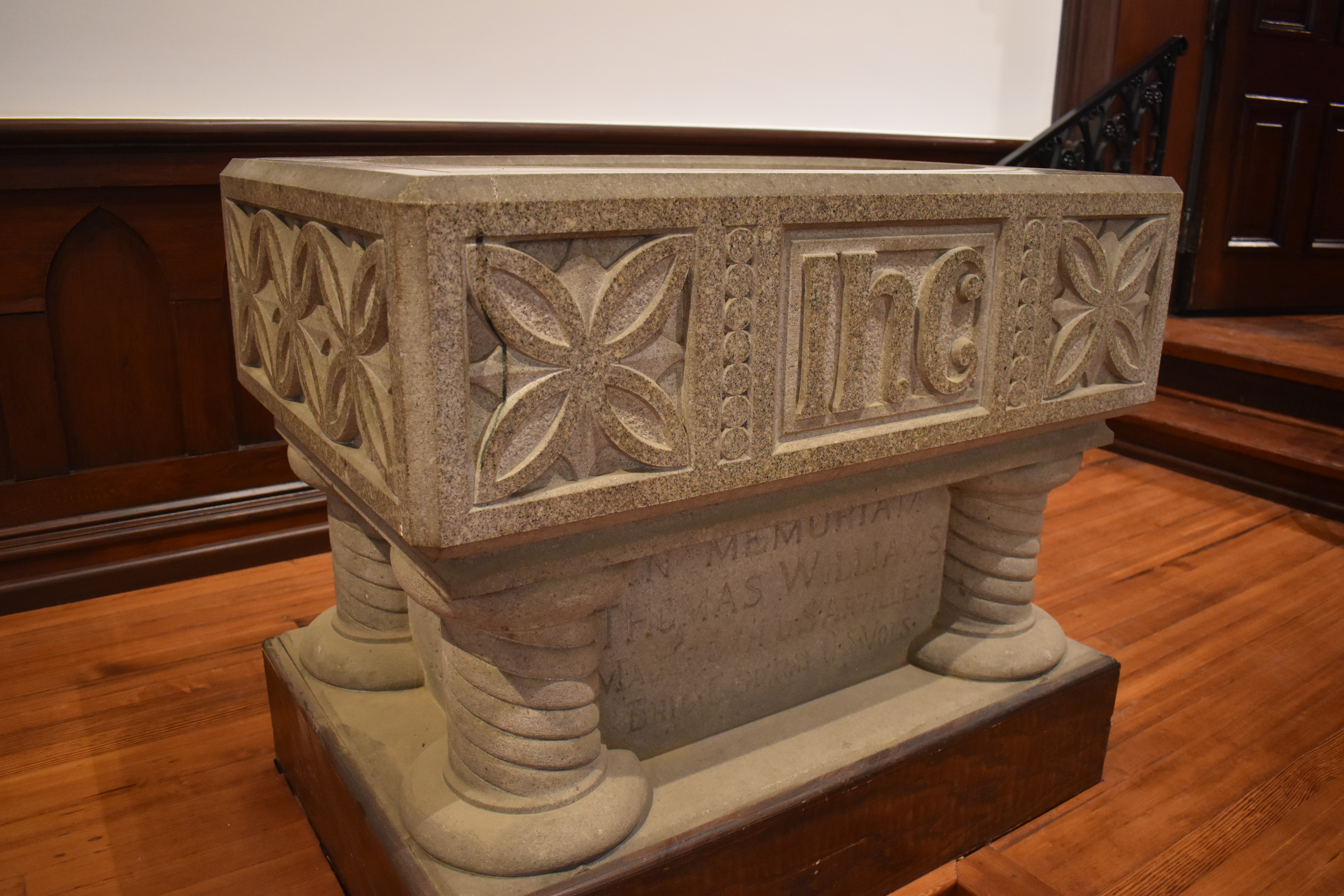
Baptismal font given in memory of Union General Thomas Williams.

The baptismal font is a single piece of Italian granite donated in 1886 in memory of Union Brigadier General Thomas Williams by his son, the Rt. Rev. Gershom Mott Williams. On May 29, 1862, General Williams arrived with six regiments of infantry, two artillery batteries, and a troop of cavalry, and began the occupation of Baton Rouge. During his time in Baton Rouge, General Williams frequently attended Sunday services at St. James. He would write letters home sharing how he was warmly welcomed by the members of St. James. He commented in these letters how the people of St. James set aside their wills for the will of God and modeled Christian hospitality. On August 5, 1862, General Williams died during the Battle of Baton Rouge. A little more than twenty years later, General Williams' son, Bishop Williams, was visiting New Orleans for the World Cotton Centennial. During his visit, he boarded a river boat to Baton Rouge to meet the men and women that worshiped with his father. At the end of his visit he shared that he was an Episcopal bishop in Michigan and was donating a new baptismal font that symbolized how despite our differences we are united in "one faith, one Lord, one Baptism, one God and Father of all."

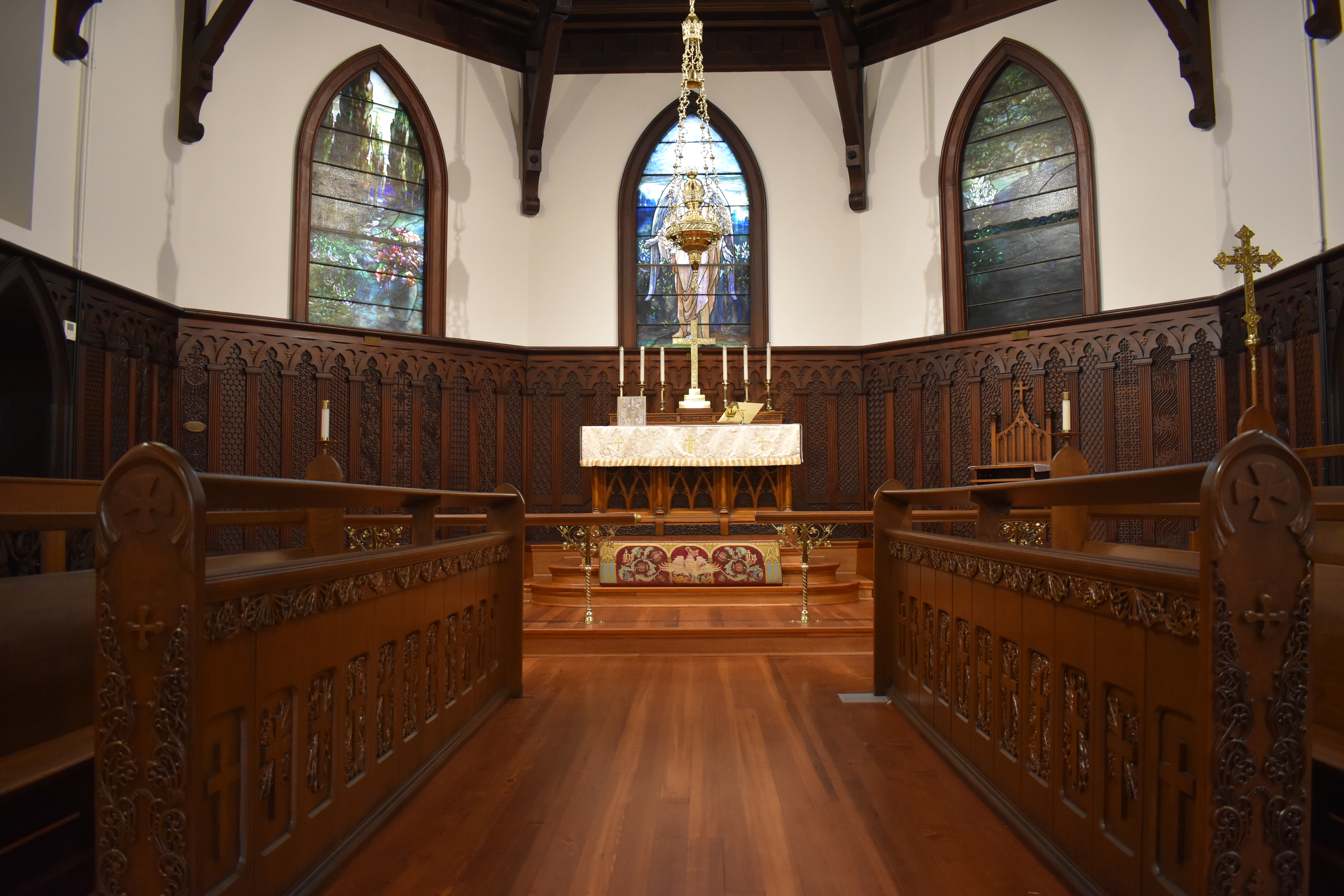
Area around the altar including wood carvings and Tiffany windows.

After the consecration of the church building in 1896, members of St. James began paying off the remaining debt and furnishing the space. After suffering from illness and crippling back problems, The Rev. Joseph Tucker (1900-1906) began carving cypress wood for the 36 panels around the altar. However, he died before could finish the project. His son, The Rev. Louis Tucker (1906-1909), was called to as the next Rector and finished the project. Shortly after Tucker's departure, three stained glass windows by Louis Comfort Tiffany were donate in 1910 to be placed immediately behind the altar. The central window features the Angel of the Resurrection with Easter lilies. The flanking windows are morning and evening in the Garden of Gethsemane. The other stained glass windows throughout the church were donated in the 1940s. In particular, the nativity window in the south transept was donated to the men and women that died in the Second World War.

Today, the overall campus is one and a half city blocks including a parish hall, gym, multiple school buildings, and ministry center. In 2020, St. James performed the first complete restoration of the facilities that included refinishing the original pine floors in the nave. The church restoration work was completed in Spring 2021 with the installation of a new three manual Goulding & Wood organ. In May 2021, two members of St. James donated a bronze cast replica of the statue entitled "Homeless Jesus" by Timothy P. Schmaltz. The statue is by the church's Ministry Center that houses the many outreach and community service ministries for the church.

== Rectors ==
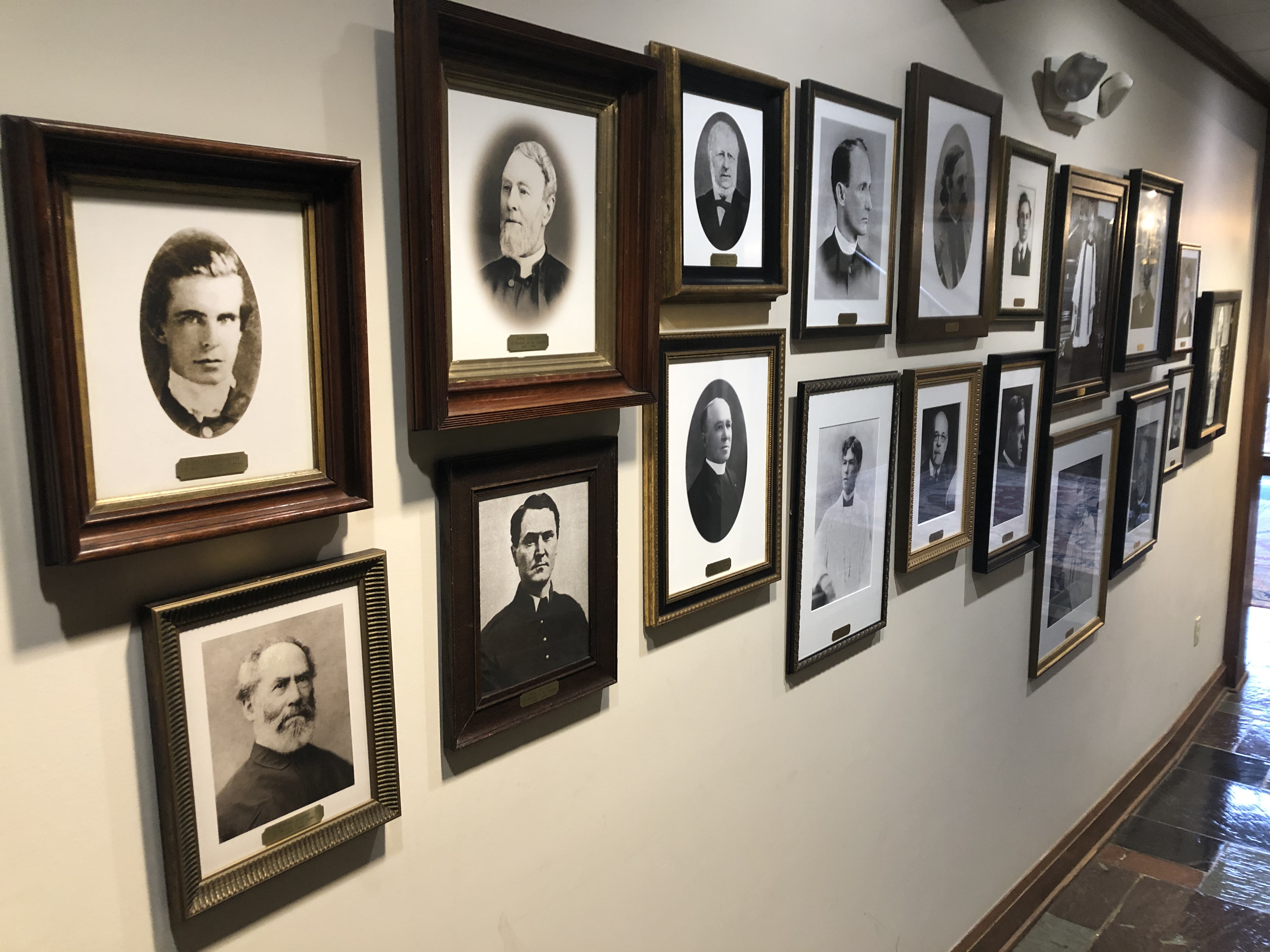
Pictures of previous rectors.

In the Episcopal Church in the United States of America, the Rector is the priest elected to head a self-supporting parish. The following are the Rectors of St. James Church:

- John Burke (1846-1849)
- John Linebaugh (1849-1852)
- John Chadbourne (1852-1853)
- Elijah Guion (1854-1859)
- John Gierlow (1860-1862)
- John Philson (1867)
- Henry Strong (1868-1876)
- Charles Stewart (1876-1879)
- Charles Goodrich (1879-1886)
- Frederic de Mattos (1886-1889)
- Joseph Cornish (1889-1898)
- J. Wilmer Gresham (1898-1900)
- Joseph L. Tucker (1900-1906)
- Louis Tucker (1906-1909)
- J. Gilmer Buskie (1910-1917)
- Royal Tucker (1919-1924)
- Malcolm Lockhart (1924-1935)
- Phillip P. Werlein (1935-1962)
- Robert C. Witcher (1962-1975)
- James Malone Coleman (1975-1989)
- Francis Daunt (1989-1993)
- Fred Fenton (1994-2001)
- Mark Holland (2003-2016)
- Christopher R. Duncan (2018–Present)

== See also ==
- National Register of Historic Places listings in East Baton Rouge Parish, Louisiana
