= Commercial Building (Alexandria, Louisiana) =

- U.S. National Register of Historic Places
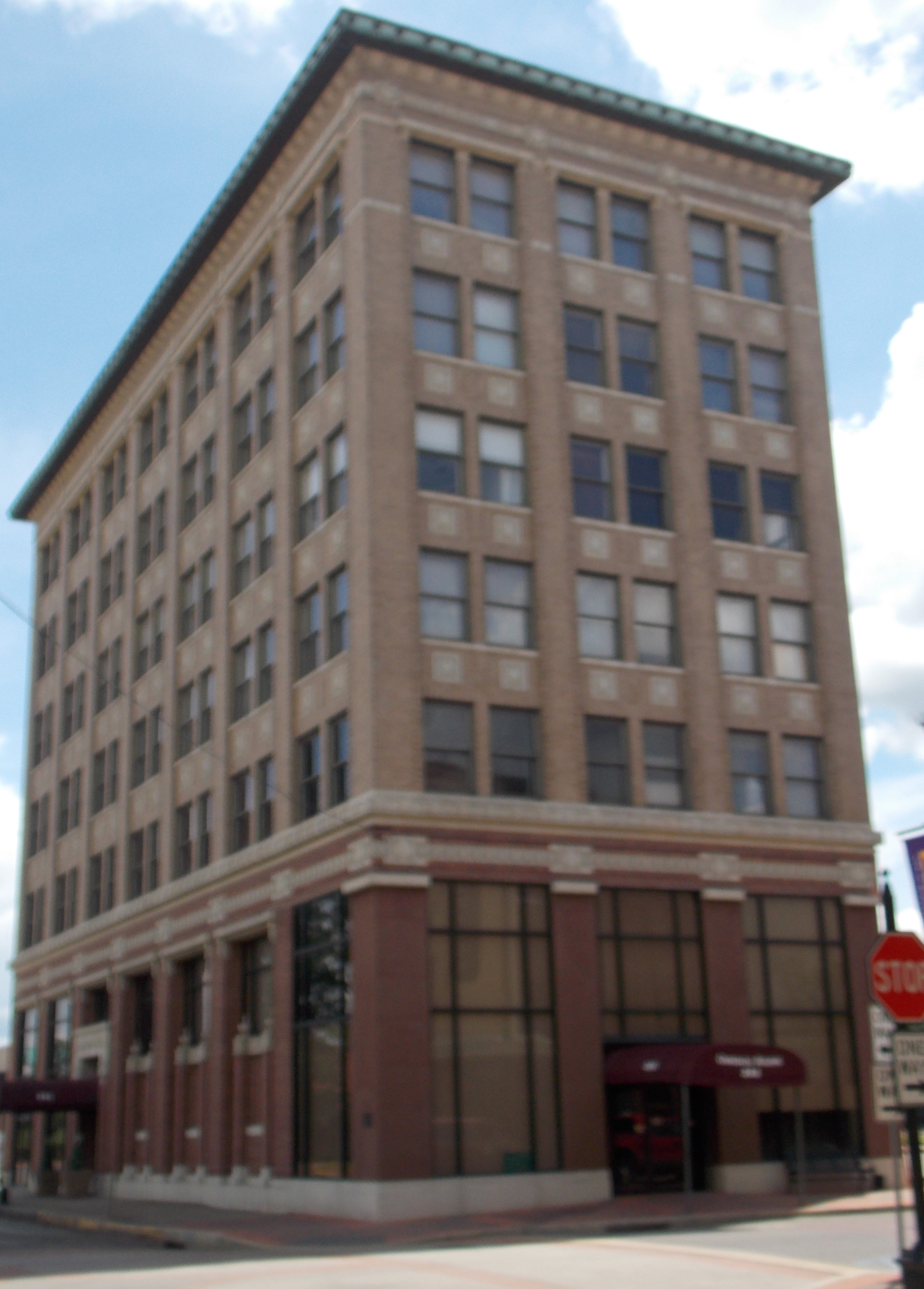

- Location within Louisiana Location within the United States
- Location: 3rd and Johnston Sts., Alexandria, Louisiana
- Coordinates: 31°18′38″N 92°26′37″W
- Area: less than one acre
- Built: 1915
- Architect: W.L. Stevens
- NRHP reference No.: 78001436
- Added to NRHP: November 29, 1978

The Commercial Building in Alexandria, Louisiana, home of the Commercial Bank and Trust Company after it was built in 1915, is a historic commercial building located at the corner of Third Street and Johnston Street. It was added to the National Register of Historic Places in 1978.

It is seven stories tall and was the city's first skyscraper. It was designed by architect W.L. Stevens. In 1978 it was still the second tallest building in Alexandria.

It was deemed notable as "a good representative example of the early phase of the American 'skyscraper' which was developed in Chicago in the 1880s. The Commercial Building is the only such example in Alexandria" and one of only four in the northern part of Louisiana.
