= Dorothy Sanders Wells =

Episcopalian bishop

The Right Reverend Dorothy Sanders Wells Bishop of Mississippi
- Church: Episcopal Church
- Diocese: Mississippi
- Elected: February 3, 2024
- In office: 2024–present
- Predecessor: Brian R. Seage

Personal details
- Spouse: Herb Wells
- Children: 2
- Education: Rhodes College (BA); University of Memphis (JD); Memphis Theological Seminary (MDiv); Candler School of Theology (DMin)

Dorothy Sanders Wells is the eleventh and current bishop of the Episcopal Diocese of Mississippi, elected in February 2024 to succeed Brian R. Seage. She was consecrated on July 20, 2024. She is both the first woman and the first African-American to head the diocese.

Wells is originally from Mobile, Alabama. She was a student of vocal performance at Rhodes College, graduating in 1982. She earned a juris doctor from the University of Memphis, and worked as a lawyer for 18 years prior to her ordination to the priesthood.

She has a Master of Divinity degree from the Memphis Theological Seminary, and a doctorate in ministry from the Candler School of Theology at Emory University. She was rector of St. George's Episcopal Church in Germantown, Tennessee since 2013 until becoming bishop.

== See also ==
- Historical list of bishops of the Episcopal Church in the United States of America
