= St. Andrew's Episcopal School (Mississippi) =

Prep school in Ridgeland, Mississippi, US

- St. Andrew's Episcopal School Seal

Location
- 370 Old Agency Road; Ridgeland; Madison County; Mississippi; 39157 (5–12); 4120 Old Canton Road; Jackson, Hinds County, Mississippi 39216 (PK–4); United States
- Coordinates: 32.434842°N 90.152849°W

Information
- Type: Independent
- Established: 1947; 79 years ago
- Head teacher: Kevin Lewis
- Teaching staff: 121.8 (on an FTE basis)
- Grades: PK–12
- Gender: Coeducational
- Enrollment: 1,084 (2019–20)
- Student to teacher ratio: 8.0
- Colors: Blue and White
- Mascot: Andy
- Team name: Saints
- Website: https://www.gosaints.org/

St. Andrew's Episcopal School is an independent, coeducational, preparatory day school in Jackson and Ridgeland, Mississippi serving more than 1,100 students in pre-kindergarten through twelfth grade.

Founded in 1947, the school occupies two campuses: the South Campus houses the Lower School (pre-kindergarten through grade 4) in Jackson, and the North Campus houses the Middle School (grades 5-8) and Upper School (grades 9-12) in Ridgeland.

The School is accredited by the Southern Association of Colleges and Schools (SACS), belongs to the National Association of Independent Schools (NAIS) and the National Association of Episcopal Schools (NAES), and is affiliated with the Mississippi High School Activities Association. The School also holds ties with St. Andrew's Episcopal Cathedral in Jackson.

St. Andrew’s is the only school in Mississippi and one of only 50 schools nationwide to receive a $2 million Malone Family Foundation grant to create scholarships for academically gifted students with financial need.

== Background ==
The school seal contains a navy circular band surrounding a shield of the same color. The school's name and the date 1947 (its founding) are inscribed on the circle. The shield is divided into four sections by a red and white cross in the form of the cross on which Saint Andrew was martyred. The top section contains a white magnolia, the state flower of Mississippi. The left section contains the Episcopal shield. The right section is a lamp. An anchor (sometimes referred to as an "anchor of faith") is in the lower section, representing Saint Andrew's vocation as a fisherman and the school's religious affiliation. The school motto (Inveniemus Viam Aut Faciemus) appears between the outer circle and the shield.

The motto, officially adopted in 1979, is "Inveniemus Viam Aut Faciemus" and translates to "We will find a way or we will make one."

The official school colors are blue and white.

== See also ==
- List of private schools in Mississippi
