= Morehouse Parish Courthouse =

- U.S. National Register of Historic Places
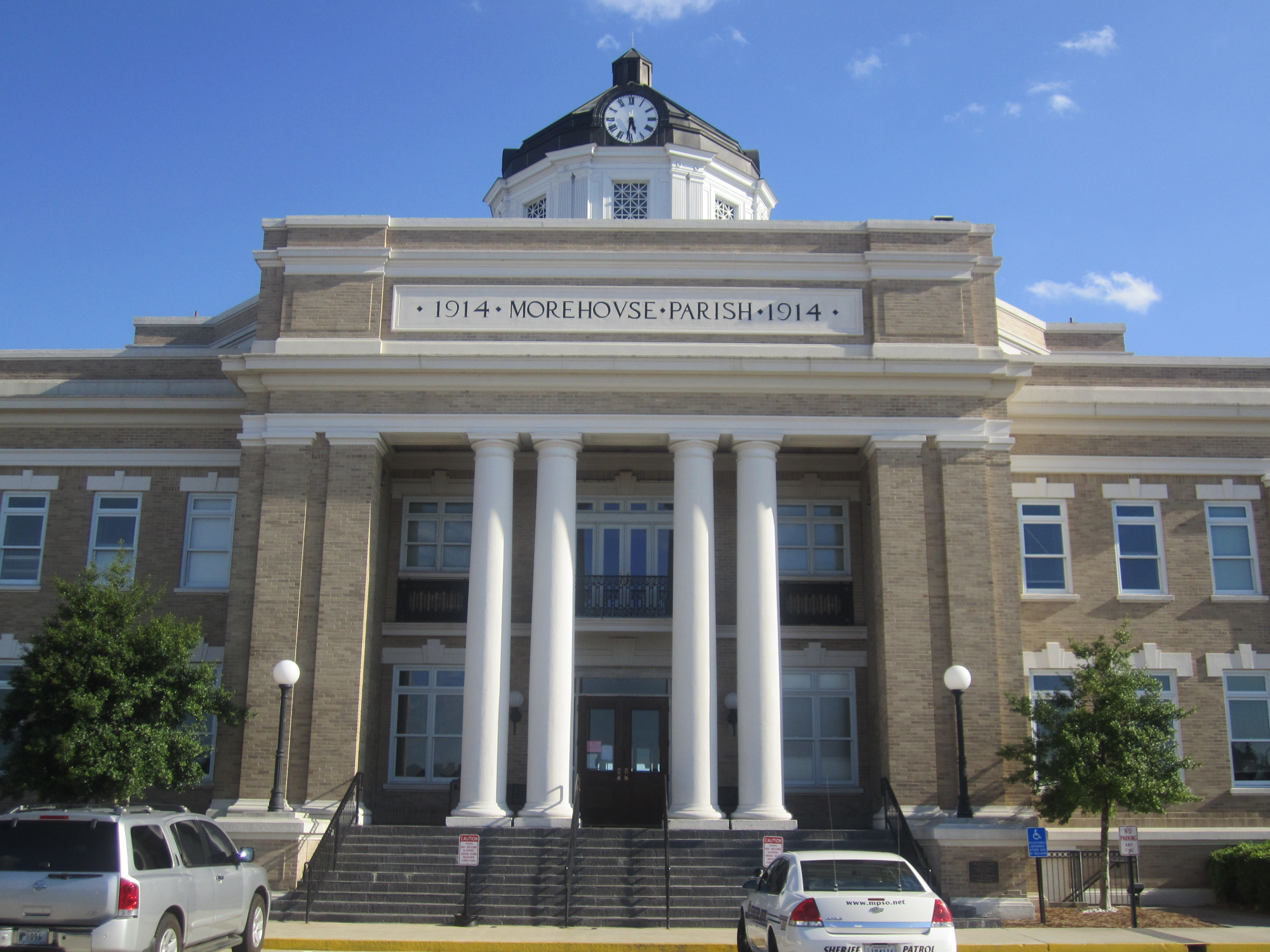

- Location within Louisiana Location within the United States
- Interactive map showing the location of Morehouse Parish Courthouse
- Location: 100 East Madison Avenue, Bastrop, Louisiana
- Coordinates: 32°46′40″N 91°54′50″W
- Area: 3 acres (1.2 ha)
- Built: 1914
- Architect: W.L. Stevens
- Architectural style: Beaux Arts
- NRHP reference No.: 02001622
- Added to NRHP: December 27, 2002

The Morehouse Parish Courthouse, at 100 East Madison Avenue in Bastrop in Morehouse Parish, Louisiana, is a Beaux Arts-style building which was built in 1914. It was listed on the National Register of Historic Places on December 27, 2002.

It is a three-story monumental building on a half-story-high basement, with beige brick veneer walls and a four-stage dome.

The building was expanded with small side wings in 1935 and expanded much further in 1966 with larger side wings that doubled the building's size, but the central block remains prominent. In 2023–2024, the iconic copper dome underwent a complete copper replacement withcraftsmanship performed by The Durable Restoration Company, a nationally known historic restoration company.

== See also ==
- National Register of Historic Places listings in Morehouse Parish, Louisiana
