= Wyatt Prunty =

American poet

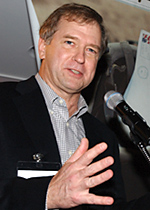

Wyatt Prunty (born May 15, 1947, in Humboldt, Tennessee) is the author of nine collections of poetry. His critical work, “Fallen from the Symboled World”: Precedents for the New Formalism, is available from Oxford University Press. Editor of Sewanee Writers on Writing (LSU Press, 2000), he has also served as general editor of the Sewanee Writers’ Series and currently serves as editor of The Johns Hopkins Poetry and Fiction Series. He has taught at The Johns Hopkins Writing Seminars, Louisiana State University, Washington and Lee University, and Sewanee, where he is the Ogden P. Carlton Professor of Literature. He is a recipient of Guggenheim, Rockefeller, Johns Hopkins, and Brown Foundation fellowships. He has served as Chancellor of the Fellowship of Southern Writers. He is the Founding Director of the Sewanee Writers’ Conference and the Tennessee Williams Fellowship program, and he is the Editor of the Johns Hopkins Poetry and Fiction Series.

== Awards ==
- 1986 Brown Foundation Fellowship
- 2001 Guggenheim Fellowship
- 2001 Rockefeller Foundation Fellowship, Bellagio
- 2005 Fellowship of Southern Writers
- 2013 Chancellor, Fellowship of Southern Writers

== Poetry collections ==
- Domestic of the Outer Banks, Inland Boat/Porch, 1980
- The Times Between, Johns Hopkins University Press, 1982, ISBN 978-0-8018-2407-4
- What Women Know, What Men Believe. JHU Press. 1986. ISBN 978-0-8018-3328-1. "Wyatt Prunty."
- Balance as Belief, Johns Hopkins University Press, 1989, ISBN 978-0-8018-3894-1
- The Run of the House. JHU Press. 1993. ISBN 978-0-8018-4626-7.
- Since the Noon Mail Stopped Johns Hopkins University Press, 1997, ISBN 978-0-8018-5646-4
- Unarmed and Dangerous: New and Selected Poems. JHU Press. 2000. ISBN 978-0-8018-6290-8.
- The Lover's Guide to Trapping, Johns Hopkins University Press, 2009, ISBN 978-0-8018-9279-0
- Couldn’t Prove, Had to Promise, Johns Hopkins University Press, 2014, ISBN 978-1-4214-1714-1

== Books ==
- Fallen from the Symboled World: Precedents for the New Formalism. Oxford University Press. 1990. ISBN 978-0-19-505786-7. "Wyatt Prunty fallen."
- Sewanee Writers on Writing, Louisiana State University Press, 2000, ISBN 978-0-8071-2631-8
