= William Mercer Green =

American Episcopal bishop (1798–1887)

The Right Reverend William Mercer Green D.D., LL.D.
- Bishop of Mississippi
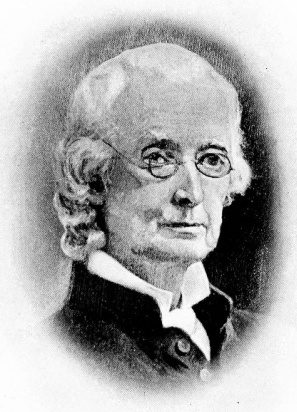
- Church: Episcopal Church
- Diocese: Mississippi
- Elected: 1849
- In office: 1850–1887
- Successor: Hugh Miller Thompson

Orders
- Ordination: April 20, 1823 by Richard Channing Moore
- Consecration: February 24, 1850 by James Hervey Otey

Personal details
- Born: May 2, 1798 Wilmington, North Carolina, United States
- Died: February 13, 1887 (aged 88) Sewanee, Tennessee, United States
- Buried: Greenwood Cemetery (Jackson, Mississippi)
- Denomination: Anglican
- Parents: William Green & Mary Bradley
- Spouse: Sarah Williams; Charlotte Fleming
- Children: 9
- Education: University of North Carolina at Chapel Hill

William Mercer Green (May 2, 1798 – February 13, 1887) was the first Episcopal bishop of Mississippi.

== Early life ==
Green was born in Wilmington, North Carolina in 1798. He was the son of William Green, a North Carolina rice planter, and Mary (Bradley) Green, a woman of Quaker extraction. He graduated from the University of North Carolina at Chapel Hill in 1818 and was ordained deacon April 29, 1821. Two years later, on April 20, 1823, Green was ordained priest. He became the rector of St. John's Church in Williamsboro, North Carolina, where he remained for four years. He then moved to Hillsborough, where he was rector of St. Matthew's Church until 1837. In that year, he was appointed chaplain and professor of belles-lettres at the University of North Carolina. He received the degree of D.D. from the University of Pennsylvania in 1845.

== Bishop of Mississippi ==
Green was elected in 1849 as the first bishop of the diocese of Mississippi. He was the 51st bishop in the Episcopal Church, and was consecrated in St. Andrew's Church, Jackson, Mississippi, February 24, 1850 by Bishops James Hervey Otey, Leonidas Polk, and Nicholas Hamner Cobbs. He consecrated the Chapel of the Cross in 1852. He was among founders of the University of the South, at Sewanee, Tennessee, in 1860 and became its chancellor in 1867.

The Episcopal Church in Mississippi grew under Green's leadership, increasing to thirty-three parishes by 1855. During the American Civil War, Bishop Green allied with the Episcopal Church in the Confederate States of America. The Battle of Jackson forced Green from the city, and he found the Church destroyed upon his return.

In 1882, in ailing health, Green requested the aid of a coadjutor bishop, and Hugh Miller Thompson was elected to the position.

Green printed sermons on "Baptismal Regeneration" and "apostolic succession," as well as an oration on "The Influence of Christianity upon the Welfare of Nations" (1831). He also published a brief "Memoir of the Right Reverend Bishop Ravenscroft, of North Carolina" (1830). His "Life of the Right Reverend Bishop Otey, of Tennessee" (1886) was published posthumously.

== Family ==
Green was twice married: firstly, to Sarah Williams, who died in 1832, leaving five children; and secondly to Charlotte Isabella Fleming, daughter of James Fleming (1780 – 1811) and Mary Fleming née Hooper (1784 – 1831), kinswoman of Johnson Jones Hooper, who bore him eight more children. Through one of his sons, he was grandfather to William Mercer Green (July 12, 1876 – November 12, 1942), fourth bishop of Mississippi.
