= St. Andrew's Cathedral (Jackson, Mississippi) =

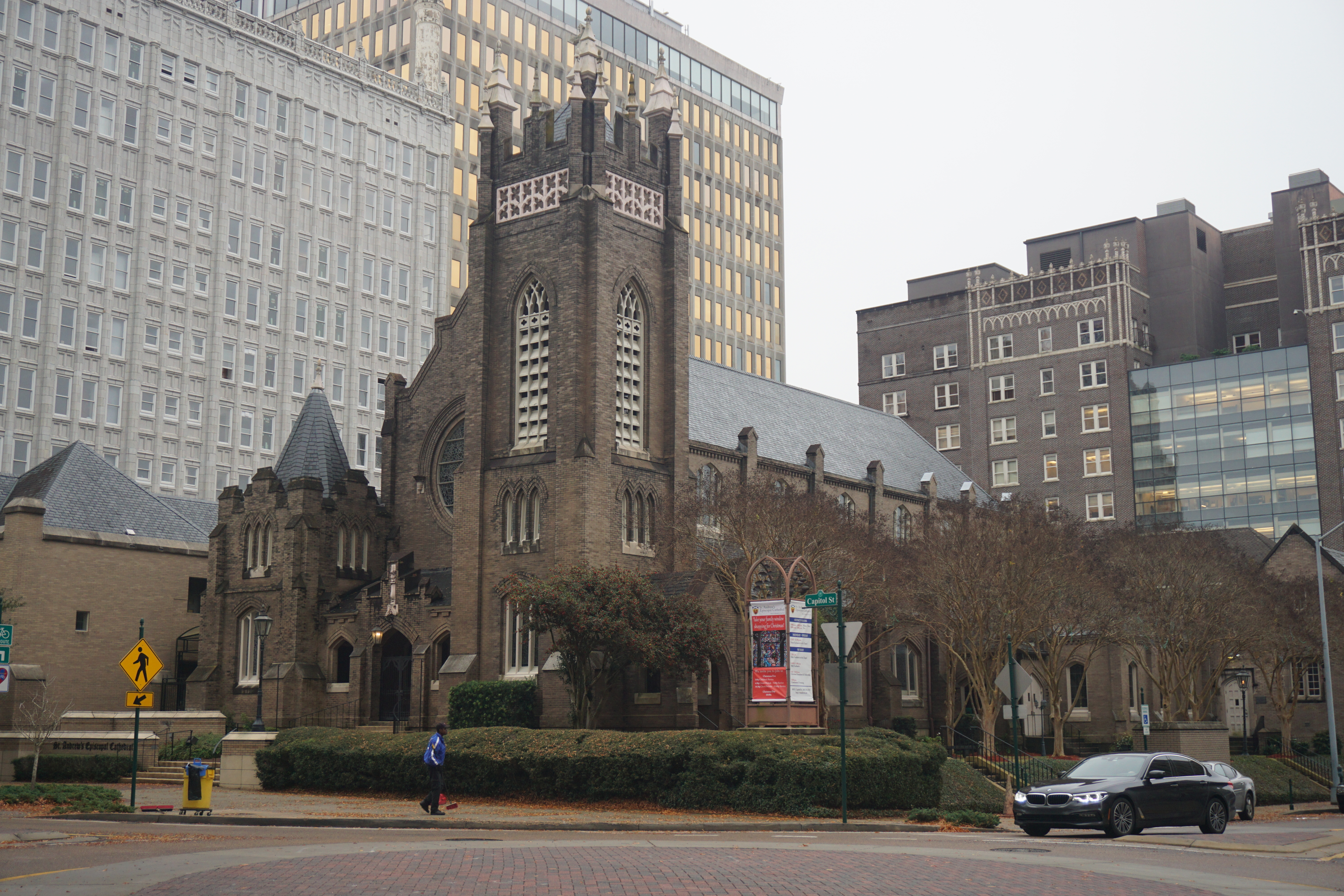

- Location within Mississippi
- 32°17′57.22″N 90°11′1.87″W
- Location: 305 E. Capitol St. Jackson, Mississippi
- Country: United States
- Denomination: Episcopal Church
- Website: standrewscathedral.org

History
- Founded: 1839

Architecture
- Style: Gothic Revival
- Completed: 1903

Administration
- Diocese: Diocese of Mississippi

Clergy
- Bishop: Rt. Rev. Dr. Dorothy Sanders Wells
- Dean: Very Rev. Anne Maxwell

St. Andrew's Cathedral is an Episcopal cathedral located in Jackson, Mississippi, United States. It is the seat of the Diocese of Mississippi. St. Andrew's is the third church to serve as the diocesan cathedral.

== History ==
St. Andrew’s began as a mission station in 1839. The Domestic Missionary Society of the Episcopal Church in New York sent a clergyman, hymnals and prayer books. The congregation numbered eight communicants at its beginning. St. Andrew’s became a parish of the Diocese of Mississippi in 1843. It was the only parish at the time that was not located along the Mississippi River. Its church was burned by the Union Army during the American Civil War in 1863. The cornerstone for the second church was laid by the Rt. Rev. William Mercer Green in 1869. By the turn of the Twentieth Century the congregation had outgrown its church building and the present structure was completed in 1903. The Parish House was constructed between 1923 and 1924. The congregation continued to grow and the building along West Street was built in 1955. The bishop moved his offices into the new building. The service area behind the church was made into a courtyard. The wing on the east side was built in 1987.

Cathedrals in the Episcopal Church in the United States were not popular until the Oxford Movement began. The Diocese of Mississippi was no different in this regard and did not have a cathedral in its first decades. St. Peter's Church in Oxford was named the first cathedral when the Rt. Rev. Hugh M. Thompson was bishop. Bishop Thompson moved to Jackson and believed the cathedral should be in the city where he resided. Therefore, St. Columba's Church was named the diocesan cathedral and served that purpose until just after Thompson's death. St. Andrew's, which grew to become the largest parish in the diocese, was elevated to be the cathedral on January 19, 1966. It became the third church in the diocese to serve this purpose.

== Architecture ==
St. Andrew’s Cathedral was designed in the Gothic Revival style. When it was built the roof featured a gable in the middle of each side with elaborate trim, which was typical of the late Victorian period. After a fire in 1930 they were simplified. The interior of sanctuary is cruciform in shape, which is found in the center aisle and the crossing. There are no transepts to give that impression on the exterior. The windows throughout the church were filled with amber glass. They have subsequently been replaced with stained glass since the 1950s. They were all given as memorials.

The original altar, lectern and pulpit were made of carved wood. The marble altar, bronze winged angel, and pulpit were given as memorials. The pews all have a trefoil carved in the end that represent the Trinity. The X-shaped cross, or saltire, that is found in several places in the cathedral is the emblem of St. Andrew.

== See also ==
- List of the Episcopal cathedrals of the United States
- List of cathedrals in the United States
- St. Andrew's Episcopal School (Mississippi)
