= Duncan M. Gray Jr. =

American bishop (1926–2016)

The Right Reverend Duncan Montgomery Gray D.D.
- Bishop of Mississippi
- Church: Episcopal Church
- Diocese: Mississippi
- Elected: March 9, 1974
- In office: 1974–1993
- Predecessor: John Allin
- Successor: Alfred C. Marble Jr.
- Previous post: Coadjutor Bishop of Mississippi (1974)

Orders
- Ordination: October 28, 1953 by Duncan Montgomery Gray Sr.
- Consecration: May 1, 1974 by John E. Hines

Personal details
- Born: September 21, 1926 Canton, Mississippi, U.S.
- Died: July 15, 2016 (aged 89) Jackson, Mississippi, U.S.
- Buried: Canton City Cemetery, Canton, Mississippi
- Denomination: Anglican
- Parents: Duncan Montgomery Gray Sr. & Isabel McCrady
- Spouse: Ruth Spivey
- Children: 4, including Duncan Montgomery Gray III
- Education: Sewanee: The University of the South

Duncan Montgomery Gray Jr. (September 21, 1926 – July 15, 2016) was the 7th Bishop of the Episcopal Diocese of Mississippi, a diocese of the Episcopal Church. Gray's father, Duncan M. Gray Sr., and his son, Duncan Montgomery Gray III, are respectively the fifth and ninth Bishops of the Diocese of Mississippi.

== Education ==
Gray was born on September 21, 1926, in Canton, Mississippi, the son of Duncan Montgomery Gray Sr. and Isabel McCrady. He attended high school in Greenwood, Mississippi, and in 1944 graduated from Central High in Jackson, Mississippi. He enlisted in the Navy and studied the Navy-12 Program in Tulane University. He spent one year as a commissioned officer in the Navy. In 1948 he graduated with a Bachelor of Electronic Engineering from Tulane University. After graduation he worked for 3 years at Westinghouse Corporation. After he commenced studies in theology at Sewanee: The University of the South where he earned his Bachelor of Divinity and years later in 1972, an Honorary Doctor of Divinity.

== Ordination ==
Gray was ordained deacon on April 8, 1953, and a priest on October 28 of the same year, both by his father, the Bishop of Mississippi. He was appointed to serve as priest-in-charge at the parishes of Grace Church in Rosedale, Mississippi, Calvary Church in Cleveland, Mississippi, and the Church of the Holy Innocents in Como, Mississippi. In 1960 he served as the chaplain to the Episcopal students at the University of Mississippi. A year later he became rector of St Peter's Church in Oxford, Mississippi. As a priest in the southern United States, Gray was best known for his work as a civil rights activist; his story was included in the University of Southern Mississippi's Civil Rights Digital Archive. Finally he served as rector of St Paul's Church in Meridian, Mississippi, until 1974 when he was elected Coadjutor Bishop of Mississippi.

== Bishop ==
Gray was consecrated on May 1, 1974, by Presiding Bishop John E. Hines in St Andrew's Cathedral. He was co-consecrated by Presiding Bishop-elect John Allin, who at that time was still bishop of Mississippi. He succeeded Allin on June 1. Apart from his fight against racism, Gray was also a supporter of the ordination of women to the priesthood, a striking difference from his predecessor's views. He was also supportive of the inclusion of laywomen to serve on vestries and diocesan committees. Gray retired as Bishop of Mississippi in 1993. He died on July 15, 2016.

== Personal life ==
In 1948 Gray married Ruth Spivey of Canton and together had four children. He is the subject of a book by Will D. Campbell, And Also With You: Duncan Gray and the American Dilemma.
