= Monroe K. Spears =

American poet

Monroe Kirk Spears
- Born: Monroe Kirklyndorf Spears; 1916; Darlington, South Carolina, U.S.
- Died: May 23, 1998 (aged 81–82); Winchester, Tennessee, U.S.
- Education: University of South Carolina; Princeton University
- Occupations: University professor, literary critic
- Spouse: Betty Spears

Monroe K. Spears (1916 - May 23, 1998) was an American university professor and literary critic. He was the editor of the Sewanee Review from 1952 to 1961, and the Libbie Shearn Moody Professor of English at Rice University from 1964 to 1986. He was the author of several books about American and British poetry.

== Early life ==
Spears was born in 1916 in Darlington, South Carolina. He graduated from the University of South Carolina, where he earned a bachelor's degree, and he earned a master's degree followed by a PhD from Princeton University.

== Career ==
Spears began his career as an English professor at the University of Wisconsin, followed by Vanderbilt University. He joined the faculty at Sewanee: The University of the South, where he was the editor of the Sewanee Review from 1952 to 1961. He was the Libbie Shearn Moody Professor of English at Rice University from 1964 to 1986.

Spears was the author of several books about American and British poetry and poets, including W. H. Auden and Matthew Prior. He was also a contributor to The New York Review of Books. He was a member of the Fellowship of Southern Writers.

== Personal life, death and legacy ==
Spears lived in Sewanee, Tennessee with his wife, Betty. He died on May 23, 1998, in Winchester, Tennessee. He is the namesake of the annual Monroe K. Spears Award at Rice University.

== Works ==
- Spears, Monroe K. (1968). The Poetry of W. H. Auden: The Disenchanted Island. New York: Oxford University Press. OCLC 907485381.
- Spears, Monroe K.; Wright, H. Bunker, eds. (1971). The Literary Works of Matthew Prior. Oxford, U.K.: Clarendon Press. OCLC 977747024.
- Spears, Monroe K. (1971). Dionysus and The City: Modernism in Twentieth-Century Poetry. New York: Oxford University Press. OCLC 718660046.
- Spears, Monroe K. (1987). American Ambitions: Selected Essays on Literary and Cultural Themes. Baltimore, Maryland: Johns Hopkins University Press. ISBN 9780801834141. OCLC 991934125.
- Spears, Monroe K. (1996). One Writer's Reality. Columbia, Missouri: University of Missouri Press. OCLC 605348751.
