= Will Campbell (Baptist minister) =

American writer (1924–2013)

Will Davis Campbell (Amite County, Mississippi, July 18, 1924 – Nashville, Tennessee June 3, 2013) was a Baptist minister, lecturer, and activist. He was a Southern white supporter of African-American civil rights. Campbell was also a lecturer and author, most notably for his autobiographical work Brother to a Dragonfly, a finalist for the National Book Award in 1978.

== Early life and career ==
Campbell was born in Amite County, Mississippi, in 1924, the son of a farmer and his wife. He credited his family with having raised him to be culturally tolerant, even though his family church had Bibles emblazoned with a Ku Klux Klan symbol. He was ordained as a minister at age 17 by his local Baptist congregation.

He attended Louisiana College, then enlisted in the army during World War II. He served as a medic. After the war, he attended Wake Forest College (BA, English), Tulane University, and Yale Divinity School (B.D., 1952).

Though he held a pastorate in Louisiana from 1952 to 1954, Campbell spent most of his career in other settings. In 1954, he took a position as director of religious life at the University of Mississippi, only to resign in 1956. This was in part due to the hostility—including death threats—he received for supporting racial integration.

He subsequently took a position as a field officer for the National Council of Churches (NCC), and joined the civil rights movement. In 1963, Campbell left the NCC to become director of the Committee of Southern Churchmen (CSC), which was his base for continuing activism.

The CSC published a journal, Katallagete, its title deriving from New Testament Greek for the Pauline phrase 'be reconciled', a reference to 2 Corinthians 5:20. The journal published articles about politics and social change, as understood through the lens of the Christian faith. It expressed ideas of the neo-orthodox movement, which Campbell had become acquainted with at Yale. Edited by James Y. Holloway of Kentucky's Berea College, Katallagete was published from 1965 until the early 1990s. The CSC relinquished control of the journal to Campbell and Holloway in 1983.

By 2005, Campbell described the CSC as "nothing ... a name and a tax exemption and whatever I and a few other people were doing on a given day." He continued to work on his own together with a network of acquaintances, including singers Johnny Cash and Willie Nelson, comedian Dick Gregory, cartoonist and playwright Jules Feiffer, and writer Studs Terkel.

Although remaining a Baptist, Campbell reportedly conducted house church worship services at his home in Mt. Juliet, Tennessee until late in his life.

Campbell died on June 3, 2013, in Nashville, from complications of a stroke he suffered in May 2011. He was 88 and was survived by his wife of 67 years, Brenda Fisher, a son, Webb, and two daughters, Bonnie and Penny.

== Activism ==
=== Civil rights ===
External videos
- “Interview with Burke Marshall” conducted in 1985 for the Eyes on the Prize documentary in which he discusses the sit-in campaign in Nashville, the bombing of Z. Alexander Looby's home, and the Freedom Rides.

In 1957, while working for the National Council of Churches, Campbell participated in two notable events of the civil rights movement: he was one of four people who escorted the black students who integrated the Little Rock, Arkansas, public schools; and he was the only white person present at the founding of the Southern Christian Leadership Conference (SCLC) by Martin Luther King Jr. Some black delegates opposed including him, but Bayard Rustin sponsored him. In 1961, he helped "Freedom Riders" of the Congress of Racial Equality (CORE) and the Student Nonviolent Coordinating Committee (SNCC) to integrate interstate bus travel, despite white mob violence, in Alabama. In a 1964 interview with Robert Penn Warren for the book Who Speaks for the Negro?, Campbell discussed many of the issues of the civil rights movement, including the assassination of Medgar Evers by Byron De La Beckwith, desegregation busing, and the relationship between theology and social activism.

He appealed to Southern Christian churches to end their own segregation and fight discrimination, rather than remain silent. Campbell eventually left organized religion, though he remained firmly Christian.

Campbell later said, "I never considered myself ... an activist in the civil rights movement, though a lot of other people considered me an activist."

His uncompromising theology led him to keep his distance from political movements. He insisted that "anyone who is not as concerned with the immortal soul of the dispossessor as he is with the suffering of the dispossessed is being something less than Christian" and that "Mr. Jesus died for the bigots as well". These convictions sometimes caused friction between Campbell and other civil rights figures. Chris Hedges in 2021 wrote that Campbell was an

unofficial chaplain to the local chapter of the Ku Klux Klan ... He refused to 'cancel' white racists out of his life. He refused to demonize them as less than human.

He visited James Earl Ray in prison. He remarked in 1976, "It's been a long time since I got a hate letter from the right. Now they come from the left."

In his book The Stem of Jesse, Campbell examined the experience of Sam Oni, the first black student to attend Mercer University in Macon, Georgia, as well as the moral courage of Joseph Hendricks, who shepherded Mercer through the process of desegregation. He also profiles Samaria Mitcham Bailey, a young American female of African descent, and her resolve in coping with the racial challenges she faced while matriculating at Mercer University.

=== Other issues ===
Campbell participated in protests against the Vietnam War and helped draft resisters find sanctuary in Canada. In the late 1970s, he spoke out against the death penalty, particularly after forming a relationship with John Spenkelink, whom the state of Florida executed in 1979. Campbell also expressed his opposition to abortion.

Like William Stringfellow and Jacques Ellul—both contributors to Katallagete—Campbell expressed his distrust of government and his belief that people must make their own history. These views distinguish Campbell's thought from that of most religious liberal activists. He is considered aligned with more recent postliberal theologians, who denounce the liberal (as well as conservative) esteem for civil society as a misplaced faith, a form of idolatry taking the place of God and Jesus Christ in Christian life.

== Works ==
This list contains every, or nearly every, book-length work authored primarily by Campbell, but it makes no attempt to list shorter works.

- Race and the Renewal of the Church (1962)
- Up to Our Steeples in Politics (1970, reprint 2005) (with James Y. Holloway)
- The Failure and the Hope: Essays of Southern Churchmen (1972, reprint 2005) (edited with James Y. Holloway)
- ... and the criminals with him ..." Lk 23:33: A first-person book about prisons (1972)
- Brother to a Dragonfly (1977): part autobiography, part elegy for Campbell's brother, part oral history of the Civil Rights Movement
- The Glad River (1982): novel
- Cecelia's Sin (1983): historical novel set among the early Baptists
- The Lord's Prayer for Our Time (1983) (with Will McBride and Bonnie Campbell)
- Forty Acres and a Goat (1986): autobiography (40 acres is about 16 hectares)
- The Convention: A Parable (1988): allegory based on the conflict between moderates and fundamentalists within the Southern Baptist Convention
- Covenant: Faces, Voices, Places (1989) (with photographs by Al Clayton)
- Chester and Chun Ling (1989): children's book, illustrated by Jim Hsieh
- Providence (1992, reprint 2002)
- The Stem of Jesse: The Costs of Community at a 1960's Southern School (1995, reprint 2002): account of racial integration at Mercer University
- "Little Red Riding: The Baptist Red-headed Girl" (1996, reprinted 2001): children's book, illustrated by Picasso
- "Elvis Presley as Redneck" (1995): address delivered at First Elvis Presley Symposium, University of Mississippi
- The Pear Tree That Bloomed in the Fall (1996): children's book, illustrated by Elaine Kernea
- And Also With You: Duncan Gray and the American Dilemma (1997): a tribute to the Rt. Rev. Duncan M. Gray, whom Campbell calls one of his heroes
- Bluebirds Always Come on Sunday (1997)
- Shugah and Doops (1997)
- Soul Among Lions: Musings of a Bootleg Preacher (1999)
- Robert G. Clark's Journey to the House (2003): a biography of the man who, in 1967, was elected Mississippi's first black state legislator since Reconstruction
- "Writings on Reconciliation and Resistance" (2010)
- "Crashing the Idols: The Vocation of Will D. Campbell" (2010)
- "And the Criminals With Him: Essays in Honor of Will D. Campbell and the Reconciled" Edited by Will D. Campbell and Richard C. Goode. (2012)

== See also ==
- Neo-orthodoxy
