= Theodore DuBose Bratton =

American bishop

The Right Reverend Theodore DuBose Bratton D.D.
- Bishop of Mississippi
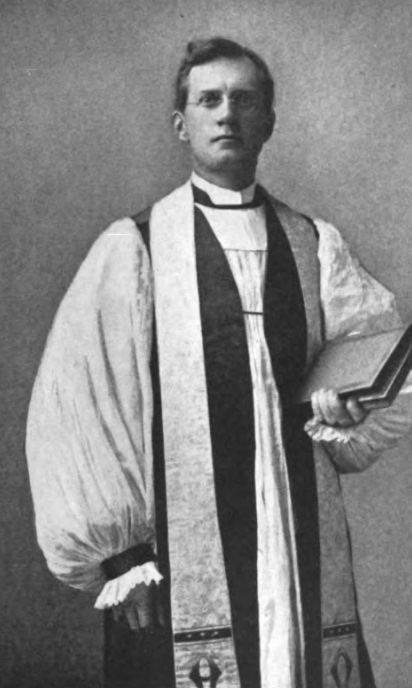
- Province: Episcopal Church
- Diocese: Mississippi
- Elected: 1903
- In office: 1903–1938
- Predecessor: Hugh Miller Thompson
- Successor: William Mercer Green

Orders
- Ordination: September 23, 1888 by William B. W. Howe
- Consecration: September 29, 1903 by Thomas Underwood Dudley

Personal details
- Born: November 11, 1862 Winnsboro, South Carolina, Confederate States
- Died: June 26, 1944 (aged 81) Jackson, Mississippi, United States
- Buried: Cedar Lawn Cemetery (Jackson, Mississippi)
- Denomination: Anglican
- Parents: John Simpson Bratton & Elizabeth Porcher DuBose
- Spouse: Lucy Beverly Randolph (m. 1888, d. 1905); Ivy Wardlaw Perrin (m. 1906, d. 1938)
- Children: 2
- Education: Sewanee: The University of the South

Theodore DuBose Bratton (November 11, 1862 – June 26, 1944) was a bishop of Mississippi in The Episcopal Church and the chaplain general of the United Confederate Veterans.

== Early life ==
Bratton was born on November 11, 1862, near Winnsboro, South Carolina. He graduated from Sewanee: The University of the South, where he earned a Bachelor of Arts degree in 1887 and a bachelor of divinity in 1889.

== Career ==
Bratton was the rector of the Church of the Advent in Spartanburg, South Carolina, in 1892. He was founder of the Episcopal Church of the Resurrection in Greenwood, South Carolina, serving from 1892 to 1897. He was a teacher at St Mary's School for Girls in Raleigh, North Carolina, until 1903.

Bratton was appointed as a bishop of Mississippi in The Episcopal Church in 1903. In 1929, he was appointed as the chaplain general of the United Confederate Veterans.

== Personal life and death ==
Bratton resided in Jackson, Mississippi, where he died on June 26, 1944, at 82.
