= Hugh Miller Thompson =

Irish bishop

The Right Reverend Hugh Miller Thompson D.D., LL.D
- Bishop of Mississippi
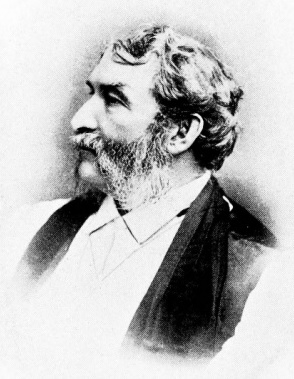
- Church: Episcopal Church
- Diocese: Mississippi
- In office: 1887–1902
- Predecessor: William Mercer Green
- Successor: Theodore DuBose Bratton
- Previous post: Coadjutor Bishop of Mississippi (1883-1887)

Orders
- Ordination: August 31, 1856 by Jackson Kemper
- Consecration: February 24, 1883 by William Mercer Green

Personal details
- Born: June 5, 1830 Derry, Ireland
- Died: November 18, 1902 (aged 72) Jackson, Mississippi, United States
- Buried: Chapel of the Cross Cemetery, Madison, Mississippi
- Denomination: Anglican
- Parents: John Thompson & Annie Miller
- Spouse: Anna Hinsdale
- Children: 1
- Education: Nashotah House

Hugh Miller Thompson (June 5, 1830 – November 18, 1902) was the second Bishop of Mississippi.

== Biography ==
Thompson was born on June 5, 1830, in Derry, Ireland however he emigrated to the United States with his parents when he was 6 years old. He trained for the priesthood in Nashotah House and was ordained deacon on June 6, 1852, and priest on August 31, 1856. Between 1860 and 1870, he served as professor of ecclesiastical history at Nashotah House. He also spent some time as the editor of the American Churchman. Between 1871 and 1872 he was rector of St James' Church in Chicago and later became rector of Christ Church in New York City. In 1876 he moved south to serve as rector of Trinity Church in New Orleans. Thompson was elected bishop coadjutor of Mississippi and was consecrated on February 24, 1883. He became Mississippi's diocesan bishop upon Bishop Green's death on February 13, 1887. Thompson remained Mississippi's diocesan bishop until his death November 18, 1902.

== Works ==
- Unity and Its Restoration: Addressed to All Christians Who Desire to Hold the Faith in Unity of the Spirit, and in the Bond of Peace.
- Eternal Penalty: Nine Essays from "The Northwestern Church."'
- First Principles: Nine Essays from the American Churchman.
- Absolution Examined in the Light of Primitive Practice.
