= Duncan Montgomery Gray III =

Episcopal bishop

The Right Reverend Duncan Montgomery Gray D.D
- Bishop of Mississippi
- Church: Episcopal Church
- Diocese: Mississippi
- In office: 2003–2015
- Predecessor: Alfred C. Marble Jr.
- Successor: Brian R. Seage
- Previous post: Coadjutor Bishop of Mississippi (2000-2003)

Orders
- Ordination: 1976 by Duncan M. Gray Jr.
- Consecration: June 17, 2000 by Frank T. Griswold

Personal details
- Denomination: Anglican
- Parents: Duncan M. Gray Jr. & Ruth Spivey
- Spouse: Kathryn Gray
- Children: 2
- Education: University of Mississippi

Duncan Montgomery Gray III is an Episcopal bishop who served as the ninth Bishop of Mississippi from 2003 till 2015. His grandfather, Duncan Montgomery Gray Sr. was the fifth Bishop of Mississippi, while his father, Duncan M. Gray Jr., was the seventh Bishop of Mississippi.

== Biography ==
Gray graduated from the University of Mississippi in 1971 and Virginia Theological Seminary after which he was ordained deacon in 1975 and priest a year later. His first post was as curate of St James' Church in Greenville, Mississippi. He also served as chaplain of Trinity School in New Orleans and was an associate priest at Holy Communion Church in Memphis, Tennessee. He later became rector of St Peter's Church in Oxford, Mississippi. On February 26, 2000, Gray was elected Coadjutor Bishop of Mississippi and was consecrated on June 17 of the same year. He succeeded as bishop in 2003 and retired in 2015.
