= Steve Schale =

Steve Schale is a political strategist in Florida. He was the State Director for the Barack Obama campaign in Florida, managing Obama's 2008 effort in the state, and served as a Florida Senior Advisor in 2012.

Born in Kankakee, Illinois, Schale is a graduate of the University of the South in Sewanee, Tennessee, where he received degrees in political science and history. He got his political start in 1996, managing the state house campaign of Doug Wiles of St. Augustine. Wiles, who went on to become the Minority Leader of the state house in Florida, where Schale joined him as his communications director.

In 2005, Schale left the legislature to take over the political operations of the State House Democratic Caucus, where under his leadership and working with former state senator Dan Gelber, the Democrats had their best two-year election cycle in history, picking up nine districts previously held by Republicans, for which Schale was called the "newest star of the Florida Democratic Party" by the St. Petersburg Times.

In June 2008, Schale was hired by Obama for America to run the Tampa-based Florida operation, helping Obama win Florida.

Following the two Obama campaigns, Schale returned to Tallahassee, where he married Nikole Souder-Schale, a regional vice president with the American Heart Association. In Florida, he advised Alex Sink's unsuccessful campaign for governor in 2010, as well as Gwen Graham's successful congressional campaign in 2014. In 2015, he helped the operations of Draft Biden, the Super PAC supporting a potential presidential bid by Obama's vice president, Joe Biden which ultimately did not materialize.
