= Episcopal Diocese of Mississippi =

Episcopal Church diocese in the US

Coordinates: 32.299268°N 90.183906°W

Diocese of Mississippi Diœcesis Mississippiensis Diócesis de Misisipi

Location
- Country: United States
- Territory: Mississippi
- Ecclesiastical province: Province IV

Statistics
- Congregations: 80 (2024)
- Members: 16,981 (2023)

Information
- Denomination: Episcopal Church
- Established: May 17, 1826
- Cathedral: St Andrew's Cathedral
- Language: English, Spanish

Current leadership
- Bishop: Dorothy Sanders Wells

Map
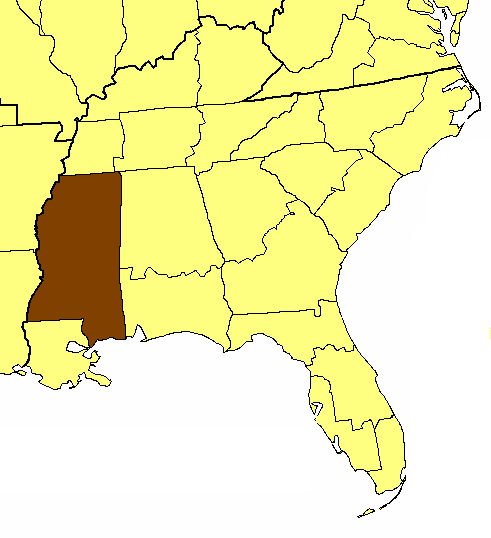
- Location of the Diocese of Mississippi

Website
- www.dioms.org

The Episcopal Diocese of Mississippi, created in 1826, is the diocese of The Episcopal Church in the United States of America with jurisdiction over the entire state of Mississippi. It is located in Province 4 and its cathedral, St. Andrew's Cathedral, is located in Jackson, as is the Allin House, the diocesan office.

Episcopalians in Mississippi have, since the mid-20th century, been by and large progressive in their views about race, culture, gender, sexuality, and other social issues affecting the state and nation; their views on economics and politics, though, are more mixed. The Episcopal Church in Mississippi has usually tolerated freedom of belief and differing types of ritual practice (e.g., Anglo-Catholicism in Biloxi and a liberal orientation in communities like Oxford and Starkville where colleges have significant presences). As such, the fallout from the ideological and theological conflicts that beset the Episcopal Church between the 1970s and 2000s (such as the Gene Robinson controversy) has not been large in comparison to other Southern dioceses (e.g., Tennessee, Fort Worth, South Carolina).

In 2003 the Diocese of Mississippi had 20,925 members; in 2023 it reported 16,981 total members. In 2024, the diocese reported average Sunday attendance (ASA) of 4,690 persons, down from ASA of 6,077 in 2015. No membership statistics were reported in 2024 national parochial reports. The 80 reporting congregations of the diocese had $18,579,537 in plate and pledge income in 2024.

== Current bishop ==
The Right Reverend Dorothy Sanders Wells was elected as the eleventh bishop of the Episcopal Diocese of Mississippi on February 3, 2024. Wells served as bishop-elect from May 2, 2024, until her ordination and consecration as bishop diocesan on July 20, 2024.

== List of bishops ==
The bishops of Mississippi have been:

1. William Mercer Green (1850–1887)
  Hugh Miller Thompson, bishop coadjutor 1883
2. Hugh Miller Thompson (1887–1902)
3. Theodore D. Bratton (1903–1938)
  William Mercer Green (grandson) bishop coadjutor 1919
4. William Mercer Green (grandson) (1938–1942)
5. Duncan Montgomery Gray, Sr. (1943–1966)
  John M. Allin, bishop coadjutor 1961
6. John M. Allin (1966–1974)
  Duncan Montgomery Gray, Jr., bishop coadjutor 1974
7. Duncan Montgomery Gray, Jr. (1974–1993)
  Alfred C. Marble Jr., bishop coadjutor 1991
8. Alfred C. Marble Jr. (1993–2003)
9. Duncan Montgomery Gray III (2003–2015)
10. Brian R. Seage (2015–2024)
11. Dorothy Sanders Wells (2024 - present)

== See also ==
- List of Succession of Bishops for the Episcopal Church, USA
- Chapel of the Cross
- St. Alban's Episcopal Church (Bovina, Mississippi)
