= John Allin =

American bishop

The Most Reverend John Allin
- 23rd Presiding Bishop of the Episcopal Church
- Church: Episcopal Church
- Elected: October 1973
- In office: 1974–1985
- Predecessor: John E. Hines
- Successor: Edmond L. Browning
- Previous posts: Coadjutor Bishop of Mississippi (1961-1966); Bishop of Mississippi (1966-1974)

Orders
- Ordination: May 10, 1945 by Richard Bland Mitchell
- Consecration: October 28, 1961 by Arthur C. Lichtenberger

Personal details
- Born: April 22, 1921 Helena, Arkansas, United States
- Died: March 6, 1998 (aged 76) Jackson, Mississippi, United States
- Buried: University of the South Cemetery, Sewanee, Tennessee
- Denomination: Anglican
- Parents: Richard Allin, Dora Harper
- Spouse: Frances Ann Kelly
- Children: 4
- Education: Sewanee: The University of the South

John Maury Allin (April 22, 1921 – March 6, 1998) was an American Episcopal bishop who served as the 23rd Presiding Bishop of the Episcopal Church from 1974 to 1985.

== Early life ==
Allin was born in Helena, Arkansas to Richard Allin, Jr. and Dora Harper Allin. He graduated from the University of the South at Sewanee, Tennessee, and its divinity school, then called St. Luke's Seminary, in 1945. He received a Master of Education degree in 1962 from Mississippi College in Clinton, Mississippi. He was ordained deacon on June 6, 1944, and priest on May 10, 1945. He served churches in Arkansas and Louisiana before becoming rector of All Saints' Junior College in Vicksburg, Mississippi, in 1958, a post he retained till 1961.

== Bishop of Mississippi ==
He was bishop coadjutor of the Diocese of Mississippi, with his consecration taking place at St. James Church in Jackson, Mississippi, from 1961 to 1966. He was elected bishop in 1966 and would serve until 1974. He was involved in the Civil Rights Movement, helping to create the Committee of Concern, an alliance of ecumenical and civic leaders that helped rebuild more than 100 African American churches that had been bombed by white supremacists in Mississippi.

== Presiding Bishop ==
He served until he was elected Presiding Bishop in 1974, as the "most conservative" of five candidates. In 1978, he offered to resign because of his opposition as a theological conservative to women's ordination, but he was persuaded to remain in office. He was the last Presiding Bishop of the Episcopal Church to have opposed women's ordination and held a pro-life stance. He retired in 1985.

== Retirement and personal life ==
After his term as Presiding Bishop, Allin was vicar at St. Ann's Episcopal Church in Kennebunkport, Maine, where his friend George H. W. Bush was on the vestry.

He married Ann Frances "Big Ann" Kelly in 1949; the couple had one son and three daughters. Allin died in Jackson, Mississippi on March 6, 1998, aged 76.

== See also ==
- List of presiding bishops of the Episcopal Church in the United States of America
- List of Episcopal bishops of the United States
- Historical list of the Episcopal bishops of the United States

Episcopal Church (USA) titles
Preceded by John Elbridge Hines	23rd Presiding Bishop; June 1, 1974 – December 31, 1985	Succeeded by Edmond Lee Browning
Preceded by Duncan Montgomery Gray, Sr.	6th Bishop of Mississippi; 1966 – 1974	Succeeded by Duncan Montgomery Gray, Jr.
