= Chapel of the Cross =

Chapel of the Cross may refer to:

- Chapel of the Cross (Mannsdale, Mississippi), listed on the NRHP in Mississippi
- Chapel of the Cross (Chapel Hill, North Carolina), listed on the NRHP in North Carolina
