= Annandale Plantation =

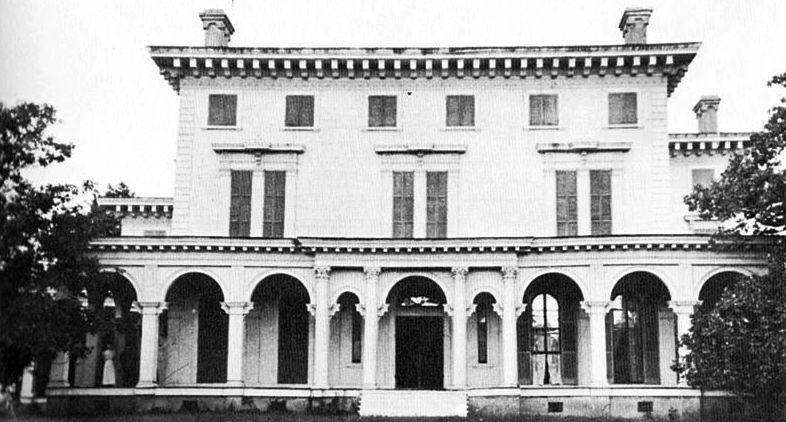
- Front facade of the main house. Two human figures under the far left arch of the front porch give an indication of scale.
- Interactive map of Annandale Plantation
- Location: Mannsdale, Madison, Mississippi
- Coordinates: 32.51545°N 90.18557°W
- Built: 1857–59
- Demolished: 1924
- Architect: Jacob Lamour
- Architectural style: Italianate

Annandale Plantation was a historic cotton plantation complex and Italianate-style plantation house in what is now the Mannsdale neighborhood of Madison, Mississippi.

The house was designed and built for Margaret Louisa Thompson Johnstone, the wealthy widow of John T. Johnstone. Completed during the late 1850s, it was destroyed in a fire during the mid-1920s. A replacement, part of a modern residential development, was later built at the site during the mid-20th century.

Before the mansion was built, Mrs. Johnstone commissioned what is known as the Chapel of the Cross, in memory of her late husband. This Italianate style structure was completed in 1852 on the plantation property. Johnstone deeded it and 10 acres to the Episcopal Diocese. The chapel was added to the National Register of Historic Places in 1972.

== History ==
John Taylor Johnstone, born on April 28, 1801, migrated with his family to Mississippi from Hillsborough, North Carolina, about 1820. He eventually obtained a number of farms totaling 2,600 acres (1,100 ha) and became wealthy by planting and harvesting cotton.

The Johnstones had two daughters, Frances Ann and Helen Scrymgeour Johnstone, and two sons, Samuel and Noah Thompson Johnstone. Both sons died in 1840, the year the family moved to Mannsdale.

The first Johnstone home on the Annandale Plantation was a large log house. Family tradition maintained that Johnstone was descended from the Johnstone family who once held the title Earl of Annandale and Hartfell in the Peerage of Scotland and that he named his plantation in their honor. When Frances Johnstone married William J. Britton in 1844, her father built a plantation house near Mannsdale for the couple as a gift. Completed in 1846 and named Ingleside, the Italianate house, with a 180-foot (55 m) wide front facade, contained eight bedrooms, dressing rooms, a parlor, library, dining room, breakfast room, and an office.

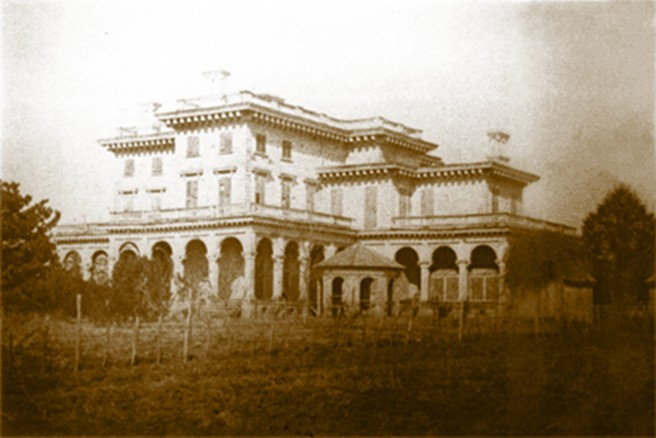
A side and rear view, taken during the 1910s.

John T. Johnstone died on April 23, 1848. In memory of her late husband, Margaret Johnstone built the masonry Gothic Revival-style Chapel of the Cross on the plantation property, north of the site of the future Annandale mansion. After its completion in 1852, she transferred ownership of the church and surrounding 10 acres (4.0 ha) to the newly created Episcopal Diocese of Mississippi. The chapel was assessed under the Historic American Buildings Survey in the 20th century and added to the National Register of Historic Places in 1972.

A few years later, Mrs. Johnstone hired the architect Jacob Lamour from New York City to design a new mansion for her and her unmarried daughter, Helen. He adapted the design from a plan in Minard Lafever's Architectural Instructor, published in 1856. Construction of the grand three-story, 40-room mansion in the Italianate mode began in mid-1857 and was completed in 1859. It featured one-story arched arcades that encircled the entire structure and spacious interior hallways, providing abundant shade and ventilation.

During the American Civil War, Margaret Johnstone cared for sick and wounded Confederate soldiers and supplied money and material to the military. She died at Annandale on March 16, 1880. The plantation was sold after her death. The Annandale mansion, then unoccupied, was destroyed in a fire on September 9, 1924. A Classical Revival-style replacement is at the site of the former mansion.

The former 560-acre (230 ha) plantation is now divided between two gated residential developments: Annandale Estates on the west side of Mannsdale Road and Reunion on the east. Each has its own golf club, also on the former plantation lands, known as the Annandale Golf Club and the Reunion Golf and Country Club.

== Folklore ==
Annandale Plantation has two ghost stories associated with it that have been published in at least two books. One, "The Ghosts of Annandale", in Jeffrey Introduces 13 More Southern Ghosts by Kathryn Tucker Windham details the supposed hauntings. One ghost is claimed in the story to be that of Annie Devlin, a former governess for Helen who died at the Annandale mansion in June 1860 and was purported to haunt its halls until the night it burned in 1924. The other is reportedly that of Helen Johnstone. The story claims that the ghost of Helen now weeps at the grave of Henry Vick, her former fiancé, in the churchyard of the Chapel of the Cross.

== See also ==
- Robert O. Wilder Building: an extant Italianate house also designed by Jacob Lamour
