= Plantation complexes in the Southern United States =

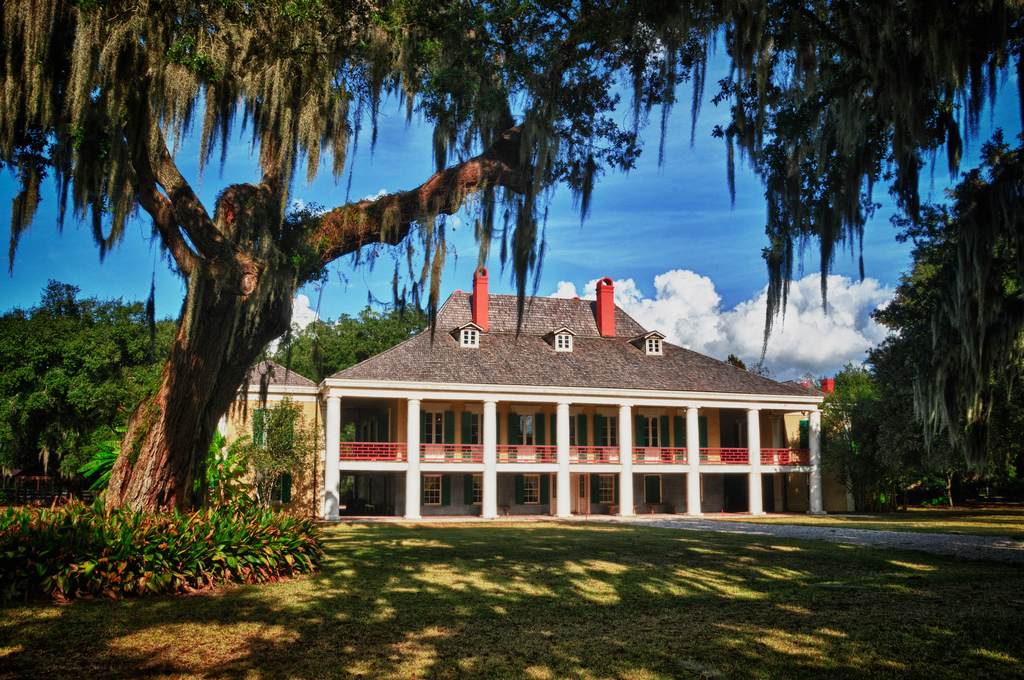
The white-columned plantation house, an "icon" of American architecture, was the "popular embodiment of the plantation way of life" and the centerpiece of the very largest deep southern plantation complexes. Pictured is Destrehan Plantation.

Plantation complexes, large-scale, self-sufficient estates which produced cash crops for profit, were common on agricultural plantations in the Southern United States from the 17th into the 20th century. The complex included everything from the main residence down to the pens for livestock. Until the abolition of slavery, such plantations were generally reliant on the forced labor of enslaved people.

Plantations are an important aspect of the history of the Southern United States, particularly before the American Civil War. The mild temperate/subtropical climate, plentiful rainfall, and fertile soils of the Southeastern United States allowed the flourishing of large plantations, where large numbers of enslaved Africans were held captive and forced to produce crops to create wealth for the planter class, a white elite.

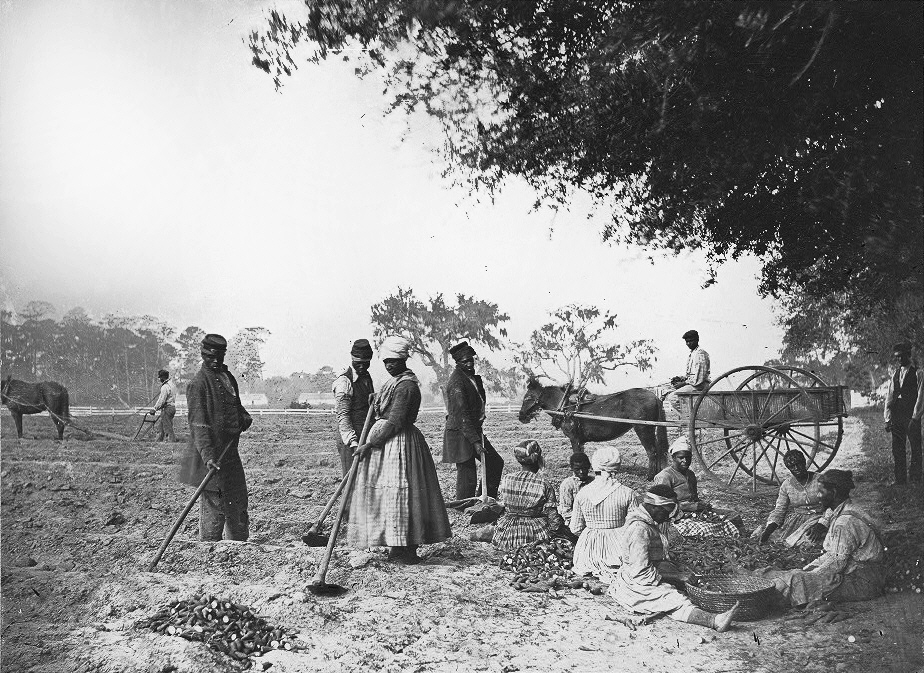
Plantation complexes were reliant on the exploitation of enslaved labor. In this picture, enslaved people on Edisto Island plant sweet potatoes (c. 1862)

Today, as was also true in the past, there is a wide range of opinion as to what differentiated a plantation from a farm. Typically, the focus of a farm was subsistence agriculture. In contrast, the primary focus of a plantation was the production of cash crops, with enough staple food crops produced to feed the population of the estate and the livestock. A common definition of what constituted a plantation is that it typically had 500 to 1,000 acres (2.0 to 4.0 km^{2}) or more of land and produced one or two cash crops for sale. Other scholars have attempted to define it by the number of enslaved persons. The term "plantation complex" is not universally agreed-upon; in the 21st century, some historians have proposed enslaved labor camp or forced labor camp as alternative terms that center the role of enslaved workers.

== Description ==
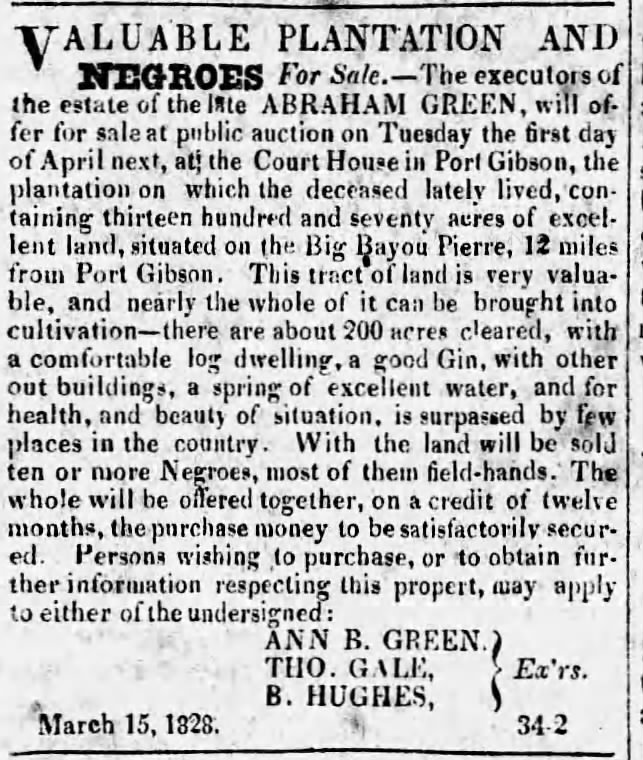
Advertisement for a plantation complex for sale, 1828, covering 1,370 acres (5.5 km^{2}) in Mississippi state, as well as "ten or more" slaves

The vast majority of Southern farmers who enslaved people held fewer than five slaves; these farmers tended to work the fields alongside the people they enslaved. There were an estimated 46,200 plantations in 1860, of which 20,700 had 20 to 30 enslaved people and 2,300 had a workforce of 100 or more, with the rest somewhere in between. Only a small percentage of Southern plantations had a grand mansion on a huge acreage.

Many plantations were operated by absentee landowners and never had a main house on site. Just as vital and arguably more important to the complex were the many structures built for the processing and storage of crops, food preparation and storage, sheltering equipment and animals, and various other domestic and agricultural purposes. The value of the plantation came from its land and the people who toiled on it to produce crops for sale. These same people produced the built environment: the main house for the plantation owner, the slave cabins, barns, and other structures of the complex.

The materials for a plantation's buildings, for the most part, came from the lands of the estate. Lumber was obtained from the forested areas of the property. Depending on its intended use, it was either split, hewn, or sawn. Bricks were most often produced onsite from sand and clay that was molded, dried, and then fired in a kiln. If a suitable stone was available, it was used. Tabby concrete was often used on the Sea Islands.

Few plantation structures have survived into the modern era, with the vast majority destroyed through natural disaster, neglect, or fire over the centuries. With the collapse of the plantation economy and subsequent Southern transition from a largely agrarian to an industrial society, plantations and their building complexes became obsolete. Although the majority have been destroyed, the most common structure to have survived is the plantation house. As is true of buildings in general, the more substantially built and architecturally interesting buildings have tended to be the ones that survived into the modern age and are better documented than many of the smaller and simpler ones. Several plantation houses of important persons, including Mount Vernon, Monticello, and The Hermitage have been preserved. Less common are intact examples of slave housing. The rarest survivors of all are the agricultural and lesser domestic structures, especially those dating from the pre-Civil War era.

=== Slave quarters ===
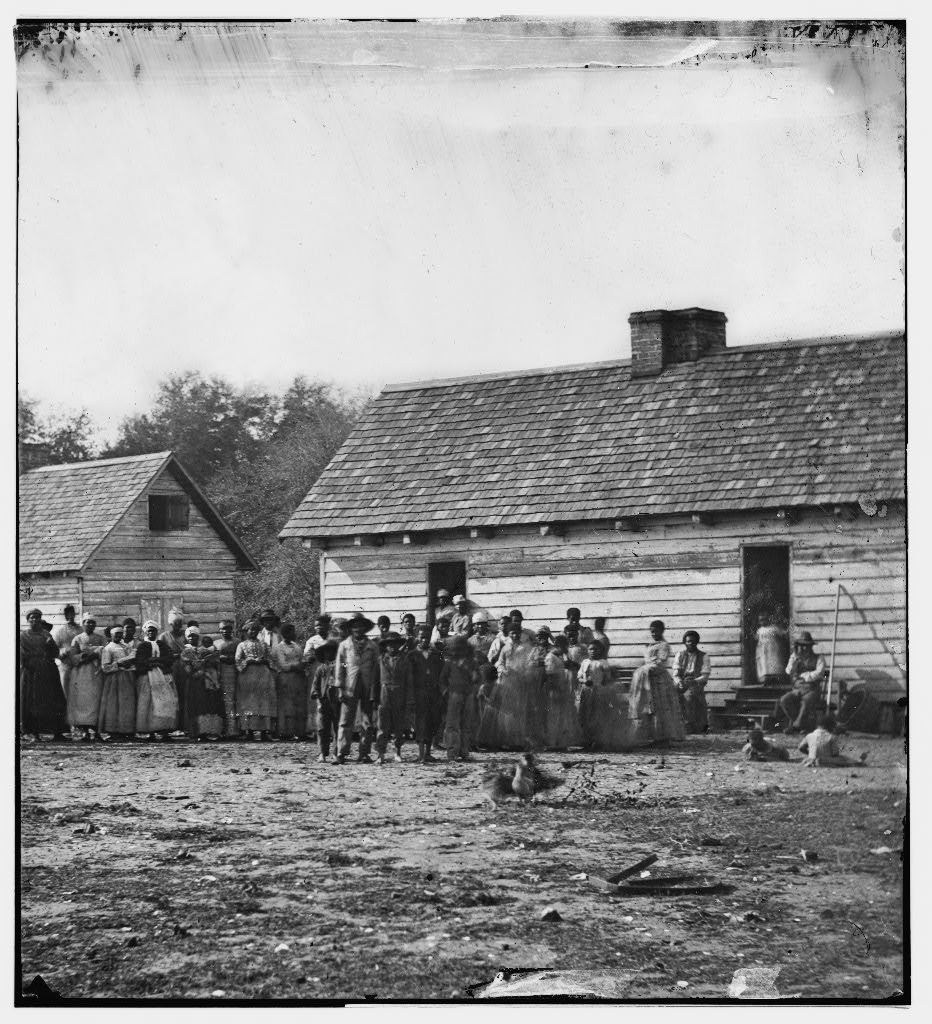
1862 photograph of the slave quarter at Smith's Plantation in Port Royal, South Carolina. The slave house shown is of the saddlebag type.

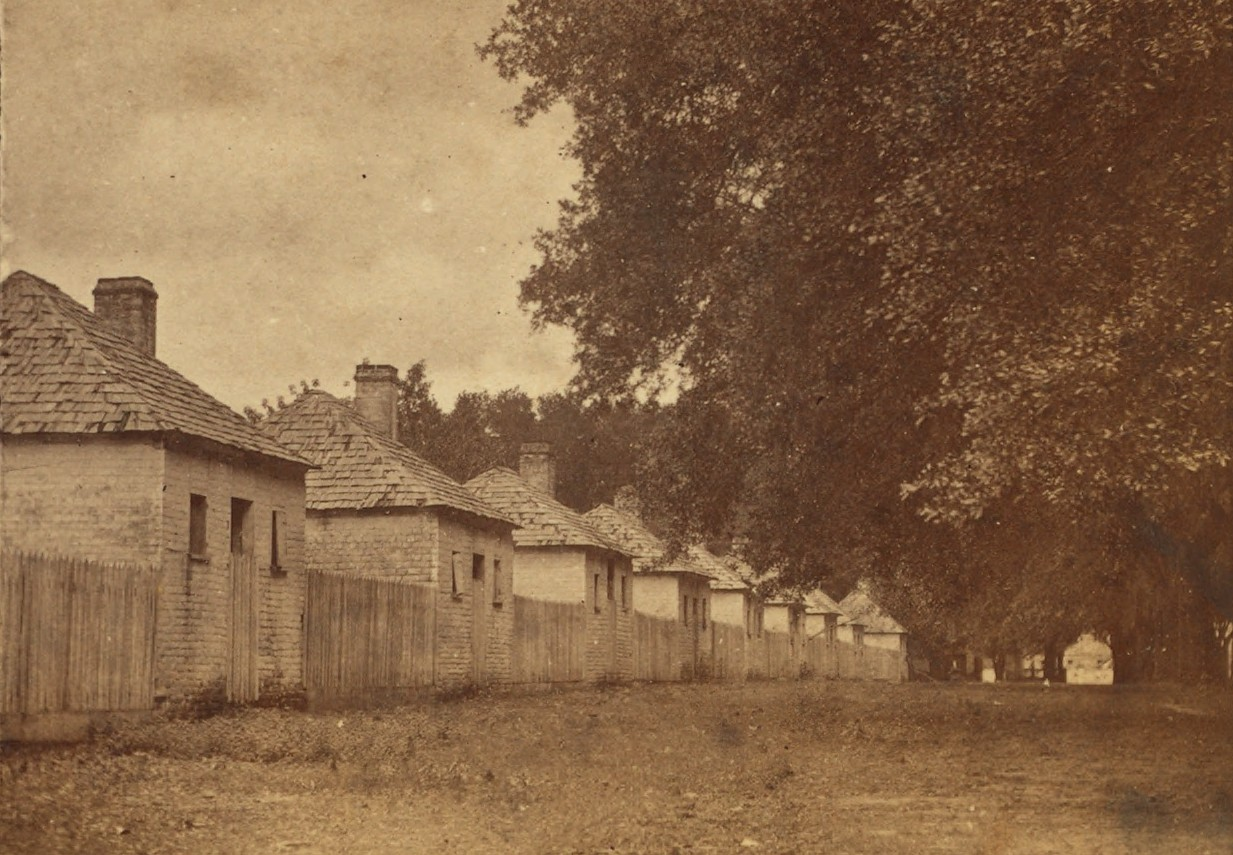
1870s photo of the brick slave quarters at Hermitage Plantation (now destroyed) near Savannah, Georgia

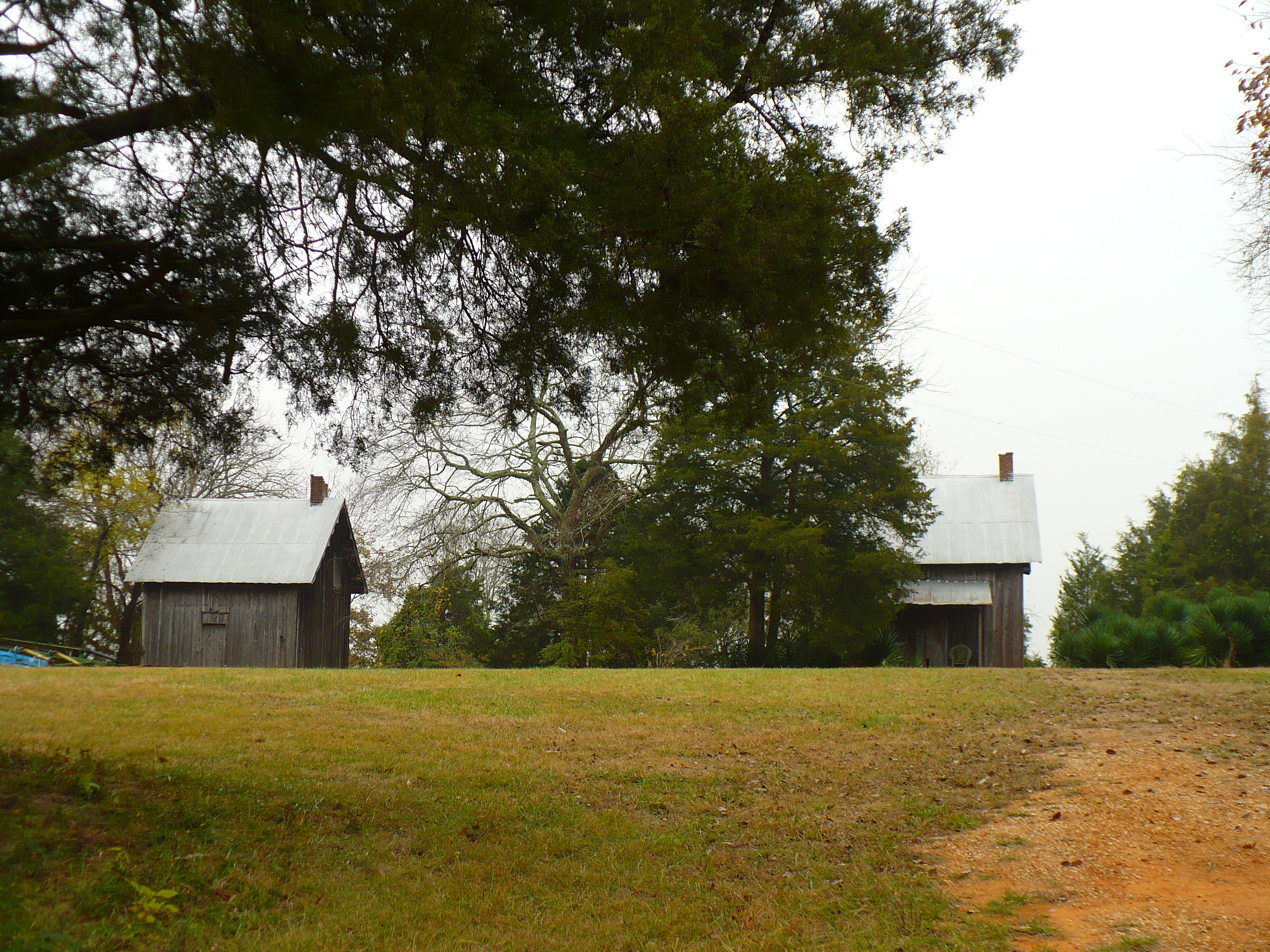
Remnants of the slave quarter at Faunsdale Plantation near Faunsdale, Alabama

Housing for enslaved people, although once one of the most common and distinctive features of the plantation landscape, has largely disappeared in much of the South. Many of the structures were insubstantial to begin with. Only the better-built examples tended to survive, and then usually only if they were put to other uses after emancipation. The quarters could be next to the main house or well away from it. On large plantations they were often arranged in a village-like grouping along an avenue away from the main house but sometimes were scattered around the plantation on the edges of the fields where the enslaved people toiled, like most of the sharecropper cabins that were to come later.

The structures were often of the most basic construction. Meant for little more than sleeping, they were usually rough log or frame one-room cabins; early examples often had chimneys made of clay and sticks. Hall and parlor houses (two rooms) were also represented on the plantation landscape, offering a separate room for eating and sleeping. Sometimes dormitories and two-story dwellings were used. Earlier examples rested on the ground with a dirt floor, but later examples were usually raised on piers for ventilation. Most of these represent the dwellings constructed for enslaved people who worked in the fields. Rarely though, such as at the Hermitage Plantation in Georgia and Boone Hall in South Carolina, even those who worked in the fields were provided with brick cabins.

More fortunate in their accommodations were those who served in the enslavers' houses or were skilled laborers. They usually resided either in a part of the main house or in their own houses, which were normally more comfortable dwellings than those of their counterparts who worked in the fields. A few plantation owners went further in providing housing for the household servants. When Waldwic in Alabama was remodeled in the Gothic Revival style in 1852, the household servants were provided with larger accommodations that matched the architecture of the main house. This model, however, was exceedingly rare.

Landscape designer Frederick Law Olmsted had this recollection of a visit to plantations along the Georgia coast in 1855:

In the afternoon, I left the main road, and, towards night, reached a much more cultivated district. The forest of pines extended uninterruptedly on one side of the way, but on the other was a continued succession of very large fields, or rich dark soil – evidently reclaimed swamp-land – which had been cultivated the previous year, in Sea Island cotton, or maize. Beyond them, a flat surface of still lower land, with a silver thread of water curling through it, extended, Holland-like, to the horizon. Usually at as great a distance as a quarter of a mile from the road, and from a half mile to a mile apart, were the residences of the planters – large white houses, with groves of evergreen trees about them; and between these and the road were little villages of slave-cabins ... The cottages were framed buildings, boarded on the outside, with shingle roofs and brick chimneys; they stood fifty feet apart, with gardens and pig-yards ... At the head of the settlement, in a garden looking down the street, was an overseer's house, and here the road divided, running each way at right angles; on one side to barns and a landing on the river, on the other toward the mansion ...

— Frederick Law Olmsted, A Journey in the Seaboard Slave States

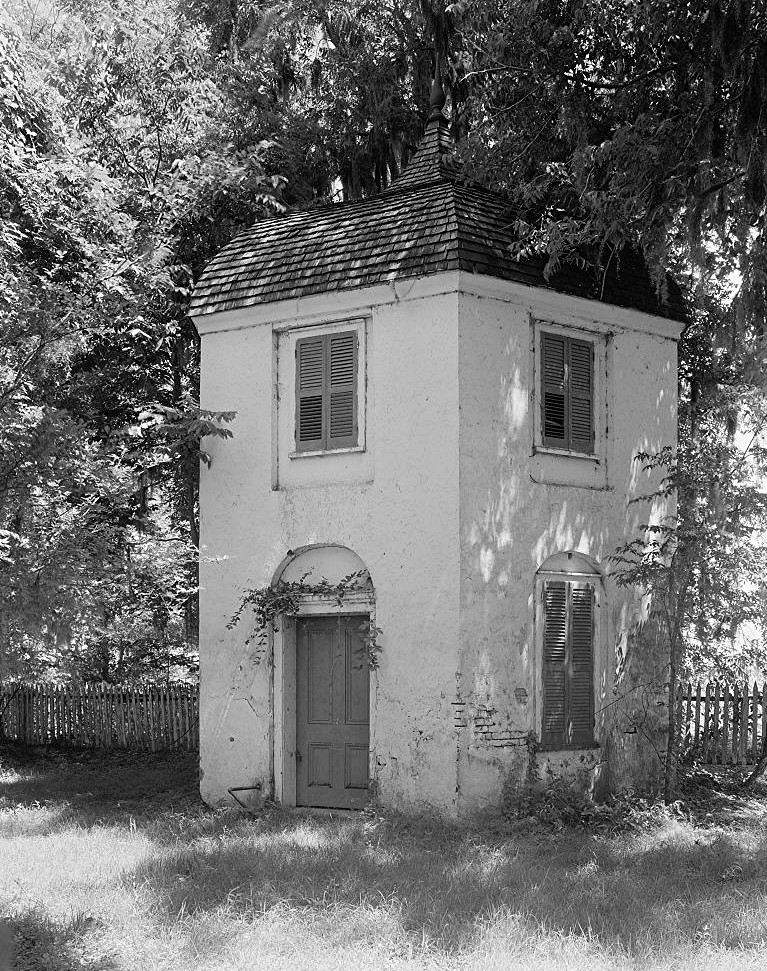
A garçonnière (bachelor's quarters) at The Houmas near Burnside, Louisiana

=== Other residential structures ===
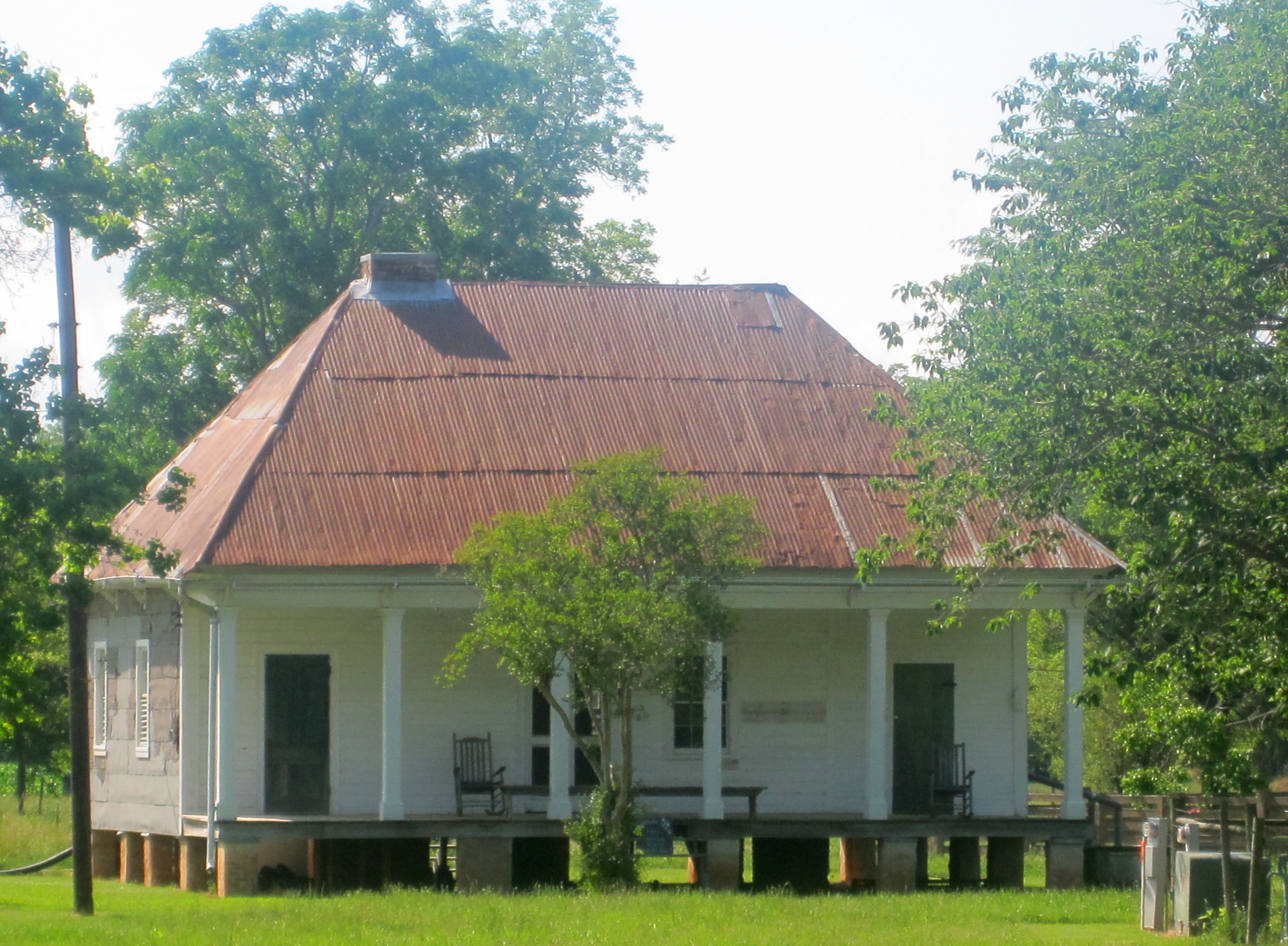
Overseer's house at Oakland Plantation near Natchitoches, Louisiana

A crucial residential structure on larger plantations was an overseer's house. The overseer was largely responsible for the success or failure of an estate, making sure that quotas were met and sometimes meting out punishment for infractions by the enslaved. The overseer was responsible for healthcare, with enslaved people and slave houses inspected routinely. He was also the record keeper of most crop inventories and held the keys to various storehouses. Economic studies indicate that fewer than 30 percent of planters employed white supervisors for their slave labor. Some planters appointed a trusted slave as the overseer, and in Louisiana free black overseers were also used.

The overseer's house was usually a modest dwelling, not far from the cabins of the enslaved workers. The overseer and his family, even when white and southern, did not freely mingle with the planter and his family. They were in a different social stratum than that of the owner and were expected to know their place. In village-type slave quarters, his house was usually at the head of the slave village rather than near the main house, at least partially due to his social position. It was also part of an effort to keep the enslaved people compliant and prevent the beginnings of a slave rebellion, a very real fear in the minds of most plantation owners.

Another residential structure largely unique to plantation complexes was the garconnière or bachelors' quarters. Mostly built by Louisiana Creole people, but occasionally found in other parts of the Deep South formerly under the dominion of New France, they were structures that housed the adolescent or unmarried sons of plantation owners. At some plantations it was a free-standing structure, and at others it was attached to the main house by side-wings. It developed from the Acadian tradition of using the loft of the house as a bedroom for young men.

=== Kitchen yard ===
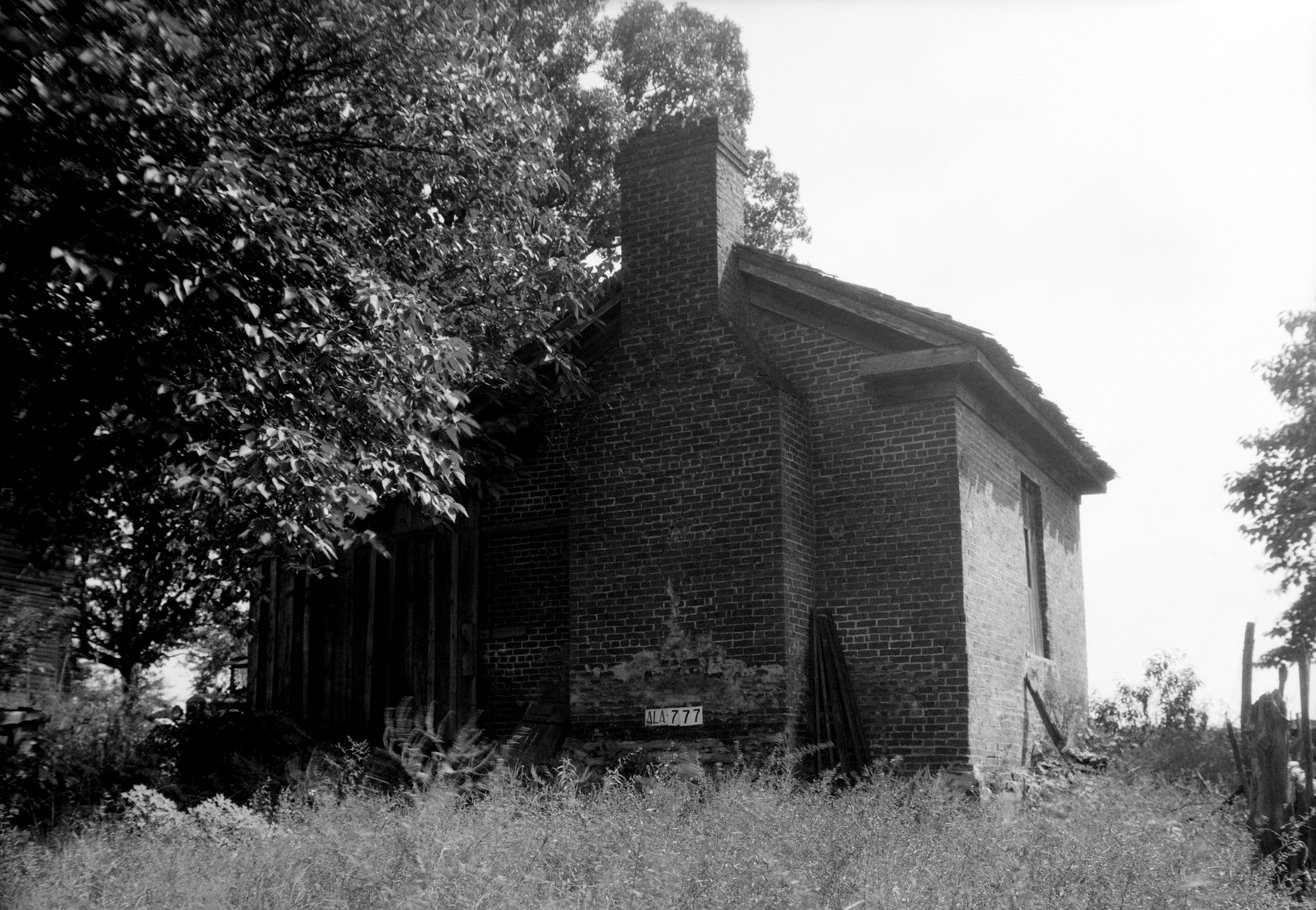
The detached brick kitchen building at the former Lowry Plantation outside of Marion, Alabama. The main house is wood-frame with brick columns and piers.

A variety of domestic and lesser agricultural structures surrounded the main house. Most plantations possessed some or all of these outbuildings, often called dependencies, commonly arranged around a courtyard to the rear of the main house known as the kitchen yard. They included a cookhouse (separate kitchen building), pantry, washhouse (laundry), smokehouse, chicken house, spring house or ice house, milkhouse (dairy), covered well, and cistern. The privies would have been located some distance away from the plantation house and kitchen yard.

The cookhouse or kitchen was almost always in a separate building in the South until modern times, sometimes connected to the main house by a covered walkway. This separation was partly because the cooking fire generated heat all day long in an already hot and humid climate. It also reduced the risk of fire. Indeed, on many plantations the cookhouse was built of brick while when the main house was of wood-frame construction. Another reason for the separation was to prevent the noise and smells of cooking activities from reaching the main house. Sometimes the cookhouse contained two rooms, one for the actual kitchen and the other to serve as the residence for the cook. Other arrangements had the kitchen in one room, a laundry in the other, and a second story for servant quarters. The pantry could be in its own structure or in a cool part of the cookhouse or a storehouse and would have secured items such as barrels of salt, sugar, flour, cornmeal and the like.

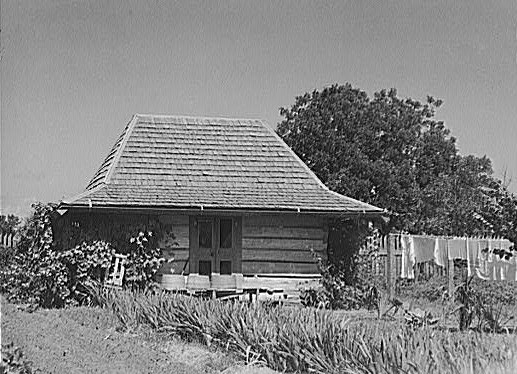
1940 photograph of the washhouse (laundry) at Melrose Plantation in Melrose, Louisiana

The washhouse is where clothes, tablecloths, and bed-covers were cleaned and ironed. It also sometimes had living quarters for the laundrywoman. Cleaning laundry in this period was labor-intensive for the domestic slaves that performed it. It required various gadgets to accomplish the task. The wash boiler was a cast iron or copper cauldron in which clothes or other fabrics and soapy water were heated over an open fire. A wash-stick (a wooden stick with a handle at its uppermost part and four to five prongs at its base) was simultaneously pounded up and down and rotated in the washing tub to aerate the wash solution and loosen dirt. The items would then be vigorously rubbed on a corrugated washboard until clean. By the 1850s, laundry was passed through a mangle. Prior to that time, wringing out the items was done by hand. The items would then be ready to be hung out to dry or, in inclement weather, placed on a drying rack. Ironing would have been done with a metal flat iron, often heated in the fireplace, and various other devices.

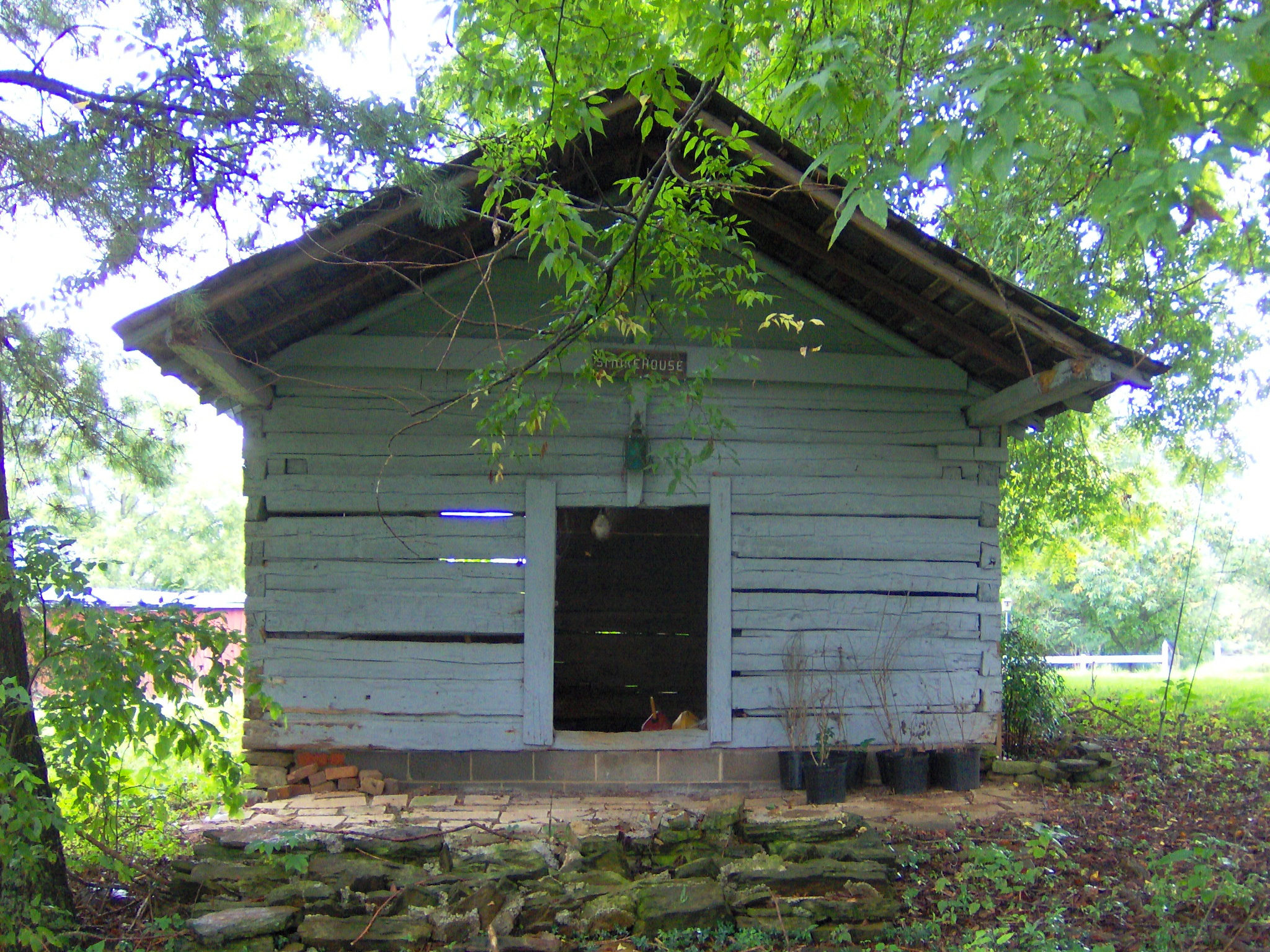
Smokehouse at Wheatlands near Sevierville, Tennessee

The milkhouse was used to make milk into cream, butter, and buttermilk. The process started with separating the milk into skim milk and cream. It was done by pouring the whole milk into a container and allowing the cream to naturally rise to the top. This was collected into another container daily until several gallons had accumulated. During this time the cream would sour slightly through naturally occurring bacteria. This increased the efficiency of the churning to come. Churning was an arduous task performed with a butter churn. Once firm enough to separate out, but soft enough to stick together, the butter was taken out of the churn, washed in cold water, and salted. The churning process also produced buttermilk as a by-product. It was the remaining liquid after the butter was removed from the churn. The products of this process were stored in the spring house or ice house.

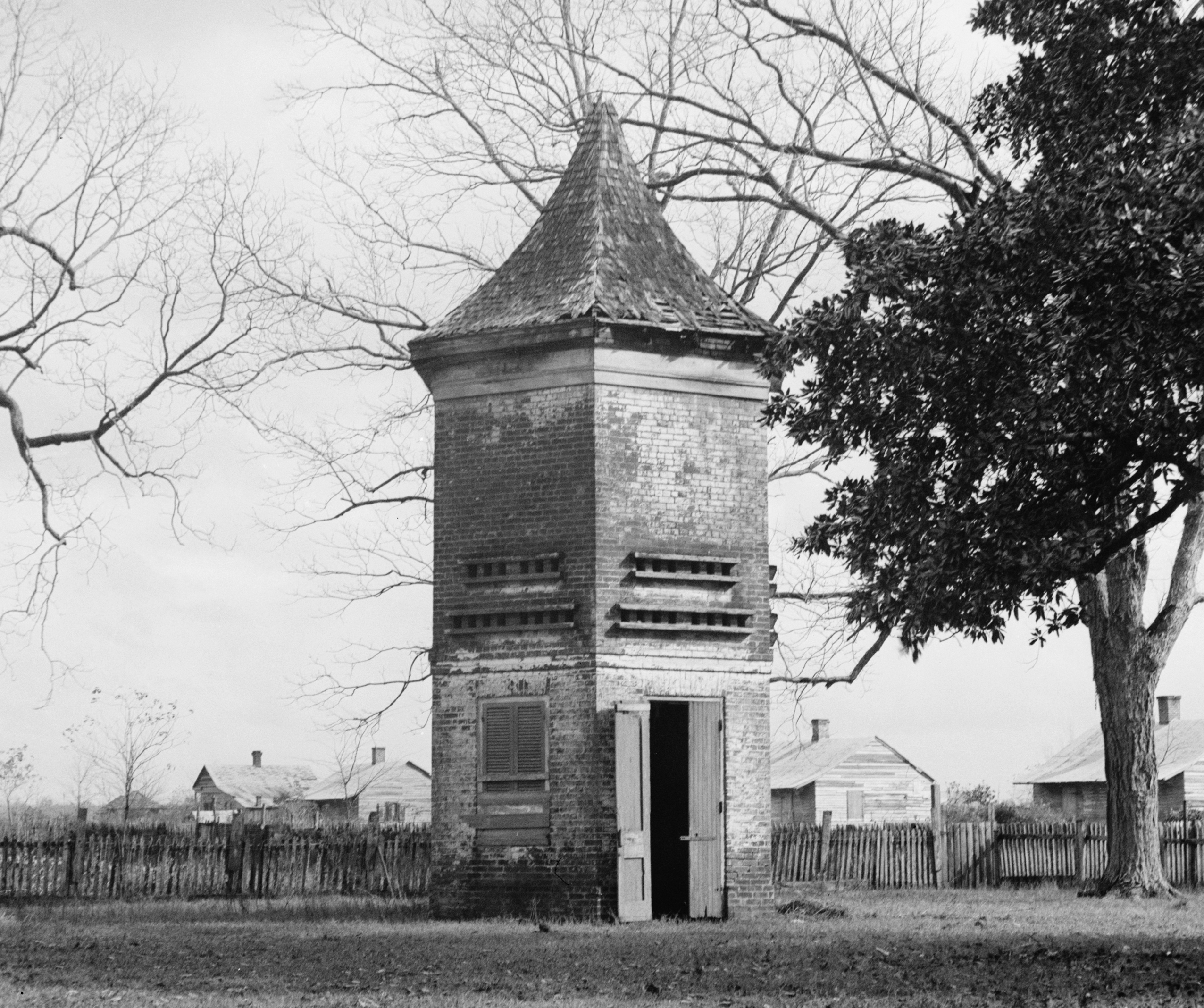
1937 photograph of one of two identical pigeonniers at Uncle Sam Plantation in Convent, Louisiana. One of the most ornate and complete plantation complexes left at that time, it was bulldozed in 1940 for levee construction.

The smokehouse was utilized to preserve meat, usually pork, beef, and mutton. It was commonly built of hewn logs or brick. Following the slaughter in the fall or early winter, salt and sugar were applied to the meat at the beginning of the curing process, and then the meat was slowly dried and smoked in the smokehouse by a fire that did not add any heat to the smokehouse itself. If it was cool enough, the meat could also be stored there until it was consumed.

The chicken house was a building where chickens were kept. Its design varied depending on whether the chickens were kept for egg production, meat, or both. If for eggs, there were often nest boxes for egg laying and perches on which the birds to sleep. Eggs were collected daily. Some plantations also had pigeonniers (dovecotes) that, in Louisiana, sometimes took the form of monumental towers set near the main house. The pigeons were raised to be eaten as a delicacy, and their droppings were used as fertilizer.

Few functions could take place on a plantation without a reliable water supply. Every plantation had at least one, and sometimes several, wells. These were usually roofed and often partially enclosed by latticework to exclude animals. Since the well water in many areas was distasteful due to mineral content, the potable water on many plantations came from cisterns that were supplied with rainwater by a pipe from a rooftop catchment. These could be huge aboveground wooden barrels capped by metal domes, such as was often seen in Louisiana and coastal areas of Mississippi, or underground brick masonry domes or vaults, common in other areas.

=== Ancillary structures ===
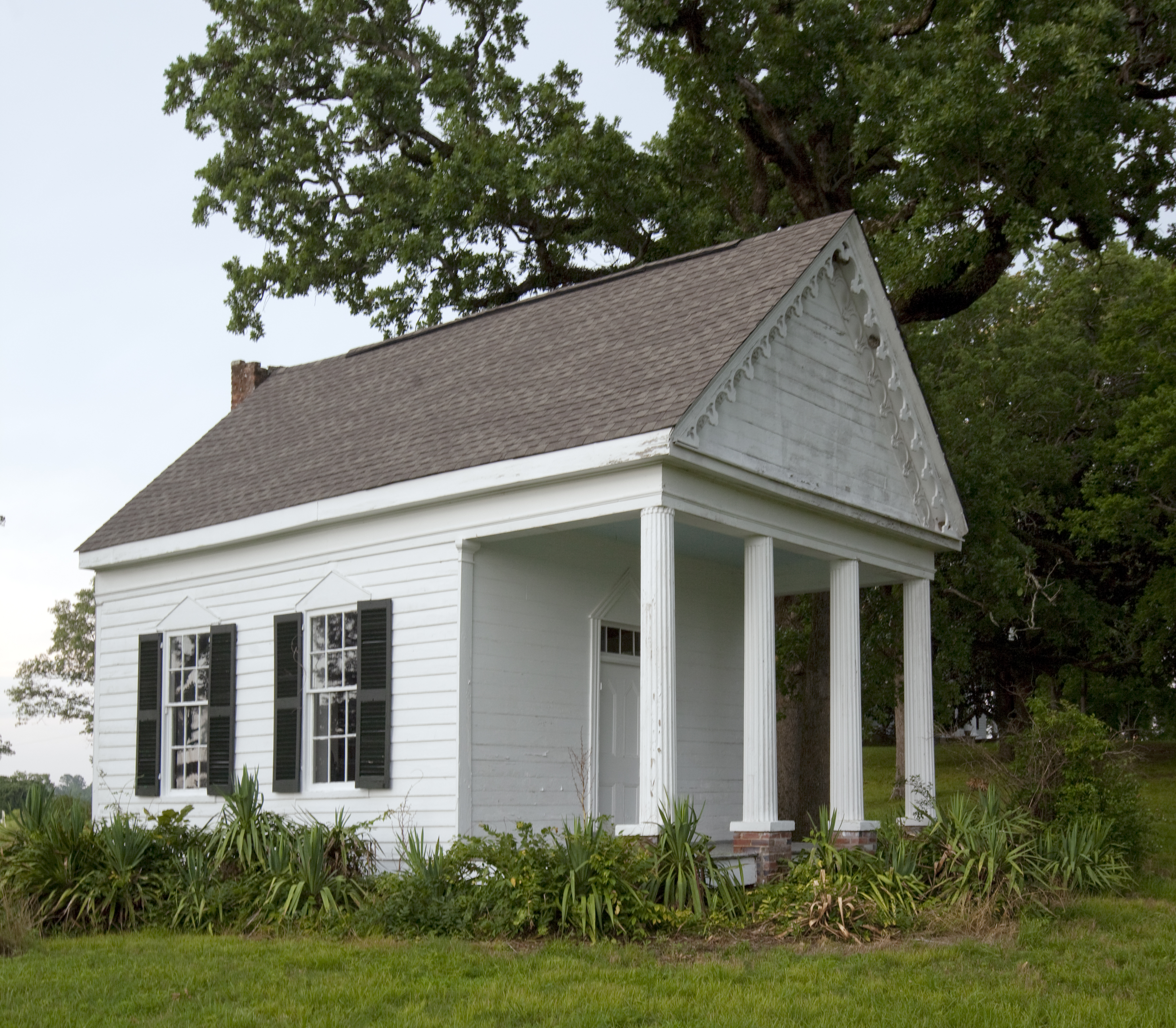
Schoolhouse for the owner's children at Thornhill near Forkland, Alabama

Some structures provided subsidiary functions; again, the term dependency can be applied to these buildings. A few were common, such as the carriage house and blacksmith shop; but most varied widely among plantations and were largely a function of what the planter wanted, needed, or could afford to add to the complex. These buildings might include schoolhouses, offices, churches, commissary stores, gristmills, and sawmills.

Found on some plantations in every Southern state, plantation schoolhouses served as a place for the hired tutor or governess to educate the planter's children, and sometimes even those of other planters in the area. On most plantations, however, a room in the main house was sufficient for schooling, rather than a separate dedicated building. Paper was precious, so the children often recited their lessons until they memorized them. The usual texts in the beginning were the Bible, a primer, and a hornbook. As the children grew older their schooling began to prepare them for their adult roles on the plantation. Boys studied academic subjects, proper social etiquette, and plantation management, while girls learned art, music, French, and the domestic skills suited to the mistress of a plantation.

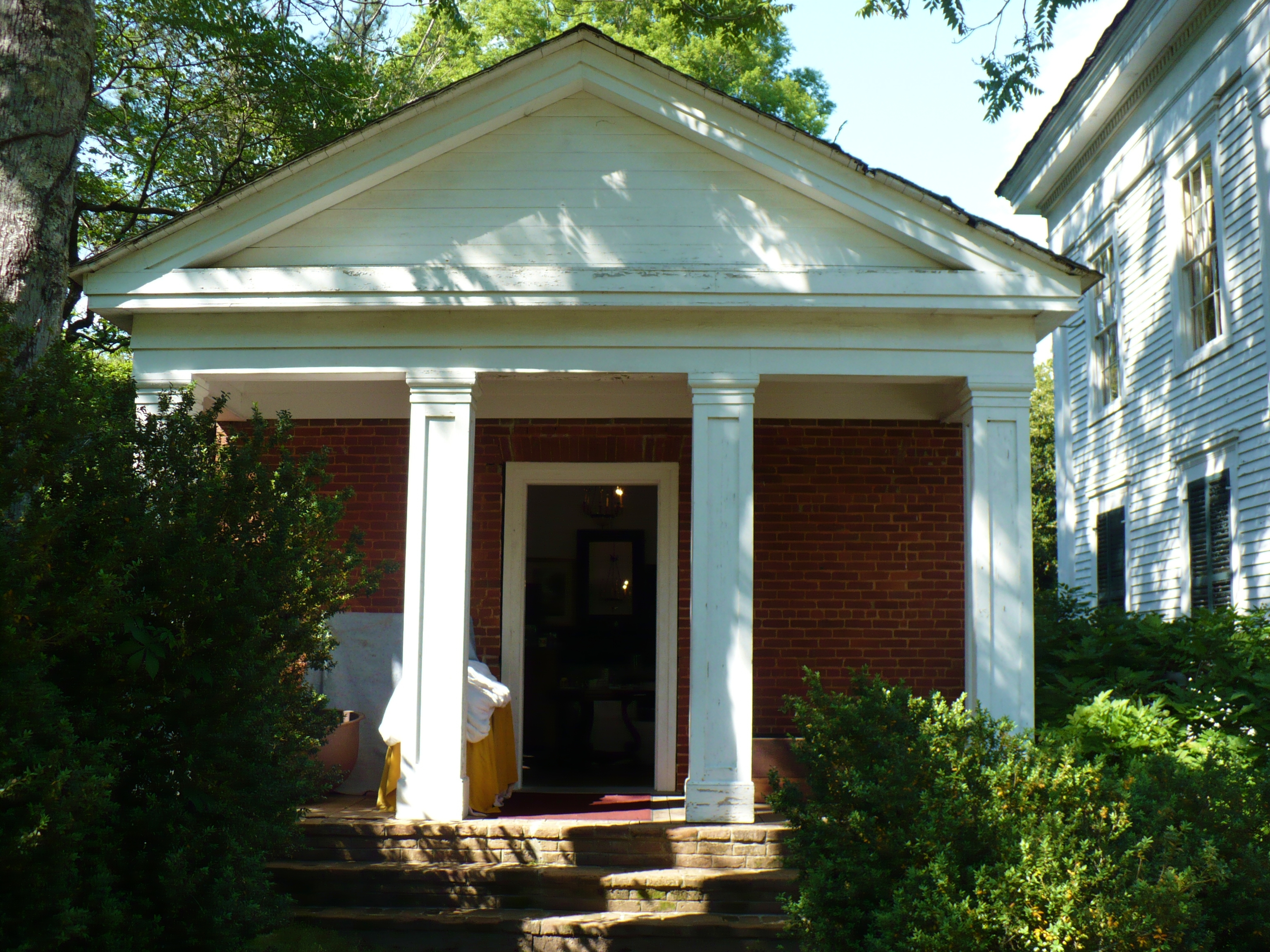
Plantation office at Waverley near West Point, Mississippi

Most plantation owners maintained an office for keeping records, transacting business, writing correspondence, and the like. Although it, like the schoolroom, was most often within the main house or another structure, it some complexed had a separate plantation office. John C. Calhoun used his plantation office at his Fort Hill plantation in Clemson, South Carolina, as a private sanctuary of sorts, with it utilized as both study and library during his 25-year residency.

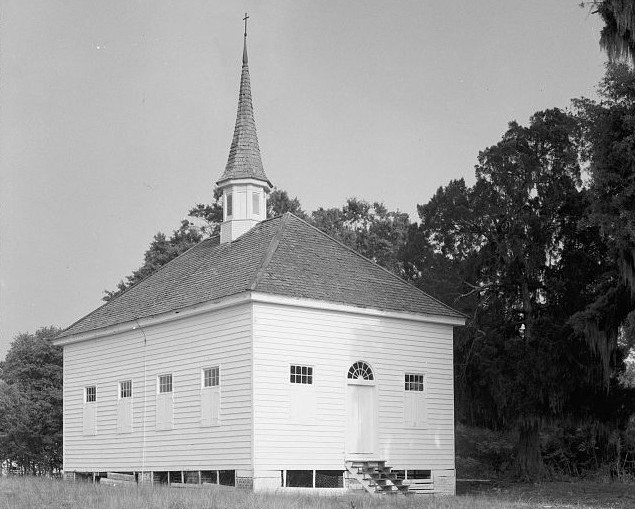
The "Negro Baptist Church" at Friendfield Plantation near Georgetown, South Carolina

Church or chapel structures were built for a variety of reasons. In many cases the planter built a church or chapel for the use of the slaves, usually recruiting a white minister to conduct the services. Some were built to exclusively serve the plantation family, but many more were built to serve the family and others in the area who shared the same faith. This seems to be especially true with planters within the Episcopal denomination. Early records indicate that at Faunsdale Plantation the mistress of the estate, Louisa Harrison, gave regular instruction to her slaves by reading the services of the church and teaching the Episcopal catechism to their children. Following the death of her first husband, she had a large Carpenter Gothic church built, St. Michael's Church. She remarried to Rev. William A. Stickney, who served as the Episcopal minister of St. Michael's and was later appointed by Bishop Richard Wilmer as a "Missionary to the Negroes," after which Louisa joined him as an unofficial fellow minister among the African Americans of the Black Belt.

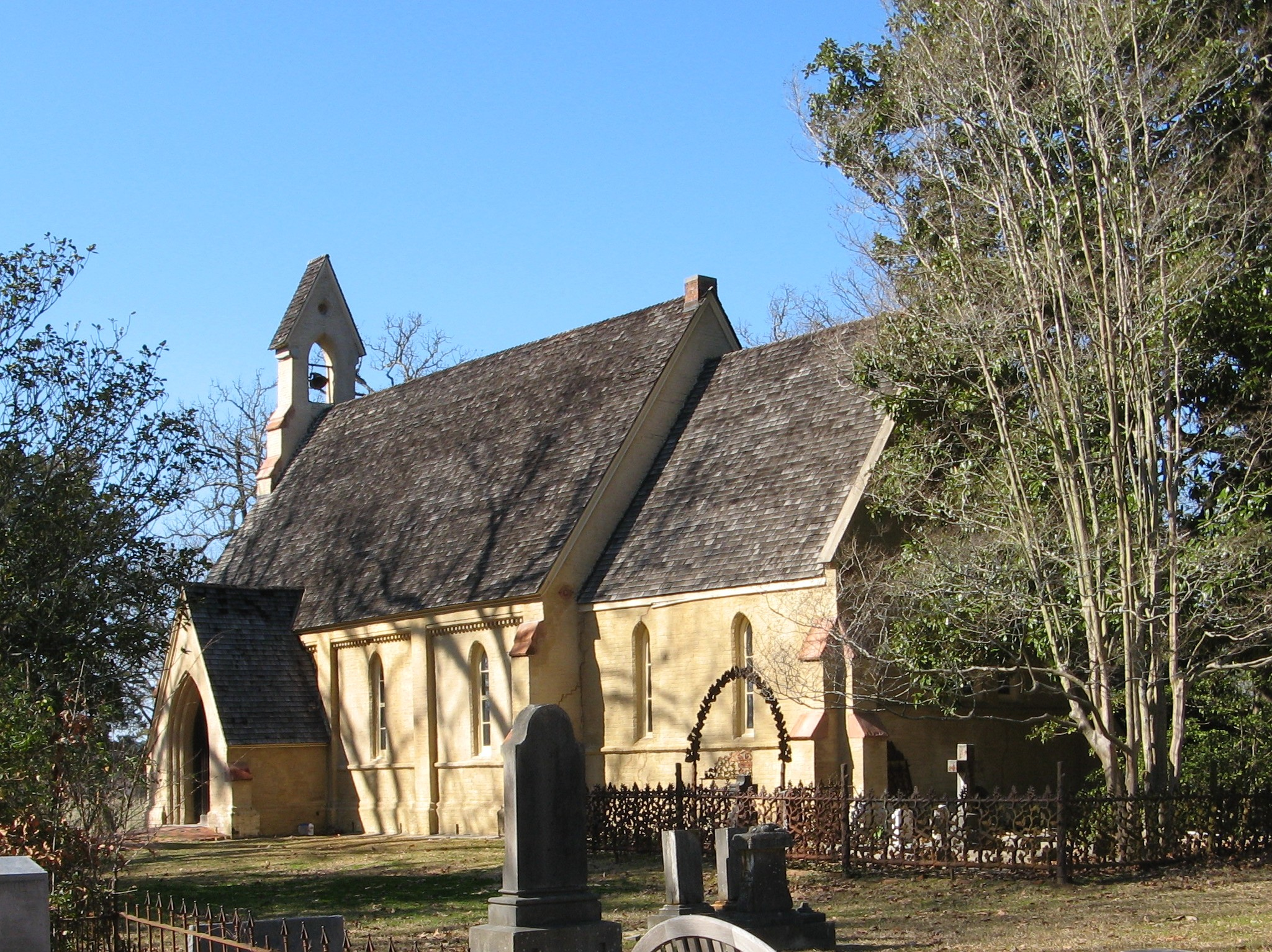
The Chapel of the Cross at Annandale Plantation near Madison, Mississippi

Most plantation churches were of wood-frame construction, although some were built in brick, often stuccoed. Early examples tended towards the vernacular or neoclassicism, but later examples were almost always in the Gothic Revival style. A few rivaled those built by southern town congregations. Two of the most elaborate extant examples in the Deep South are the Chapel of the Cross at Annandale Plantation and St. Mary's Chapel at Laurel Hill Plantation, both Episcopalian structures in Mississippi. In both cases the original plantation houses have been destroyed, but the quality and design of the churches can give some insight into how elaborate some plantation complexes and their buildings may have been. St. Mary Chapel in Natchez, Mississippi, dates to 1839, built in stuccoed brick with large Gothic and Tudor arch windows, hood mouldings over the doors and windows, buttresses, a crenelated roof-line, and a small Gothic spire crowning the whole. Although construction records are very sketchy, the Chapel of the Cross, built from 1850 to 1852 near Madison, Mississippi, may be attributable to Frank Wills or Richard Upjohn, both of whom designed almost identical churches in the North during the same time period that the Chapel of the Cross was built.

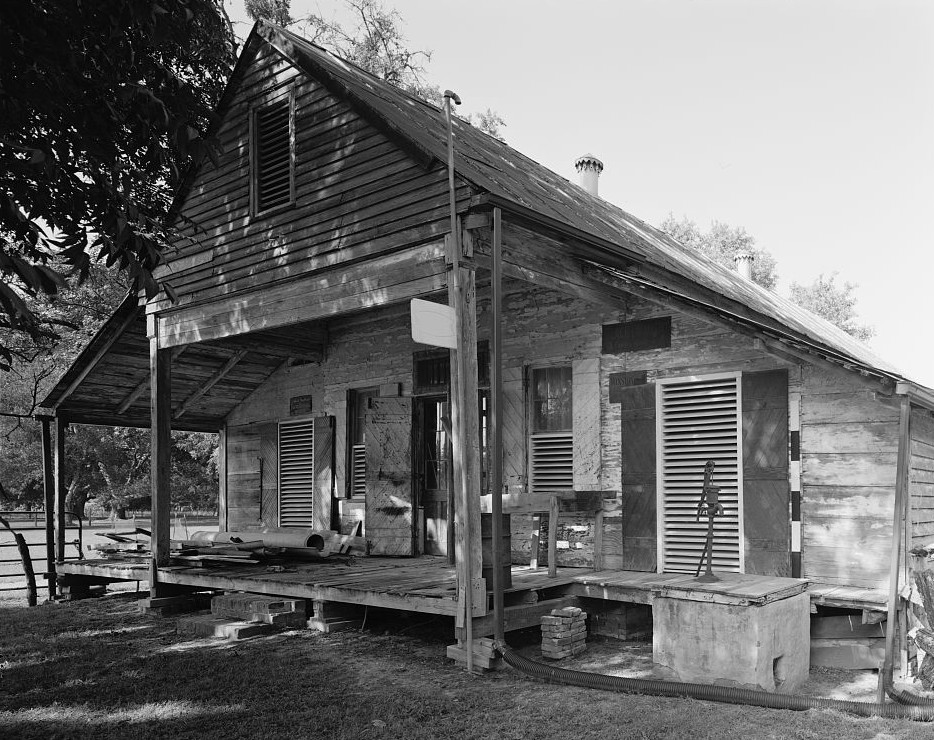
Plantation store at Oakland Plantation near Natchitoches, Louisiana

Although some prewar plantations had a commissary that distributed food and supplies to enslaved people, the plantation store was essentially a postwar addition to the plantation complex. In addition to the share of their crop already owed to the plantation owner for the use of his or her land, tenants and sharecroppers purchased, usually on credit against their next crop, the food staples and equipment that they relied on for their existence. This type of debt bondage, for blacks and poor whites, led to the Farmers' Alliance in the late 19th century that began to bring blacks and whites together for a common cause. This early populist movement is largely credited with helping to cause state governments in the South, mostly controlled by the planter elite, to enact various laws that disenfranchised poor whites and blacks, through grandfather clauses, literacy tests, poll taxes, and various other laws.

=== Agricultural structures ===
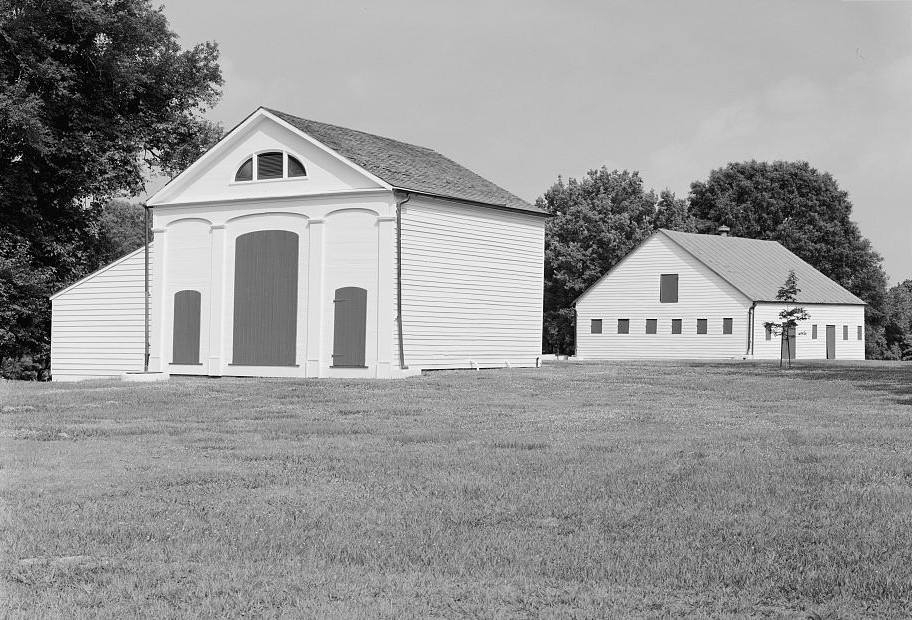
Carriage house (left) and stable (right) at Melrose in Natchez, Mississippi

The types of agricultural structures depended on what crops and animals were raised on the plantation. Common crops included corn, upland cotton, sea island cotton, rice, sugarcane, and tobacco. Besides those mentioned earlier, cattle, ducks, goats, hogs, and sheep were raised for their derived products and/or meat. All estates would have possessed various types of animal pens, stables, and a variety of barns. Many plantations utilized a number of specialized structures that were crop-specific and only found on that type of plantation.

Plantation barns can be classified by function, depending on what type of crop or livestock were raised. In the upper South, like their counterparts in the North, barns had to provide basic shelter for the animals and storage of fodder. Most plantations in the Deep South did not have to provide substantial shelter to their animals during the winter. Animals were often kept in fattening pens with a simple shed for shelter, with the main barn or barns being utilized for crop storage or processing only. Stables were an essential type of barn on the plantation, used to house both horses and mules. These were usually separate, one for each type of animal. The mule stable was the most important on the vast majority of estates, since the mules did most of the work, pulling the plows and carts.

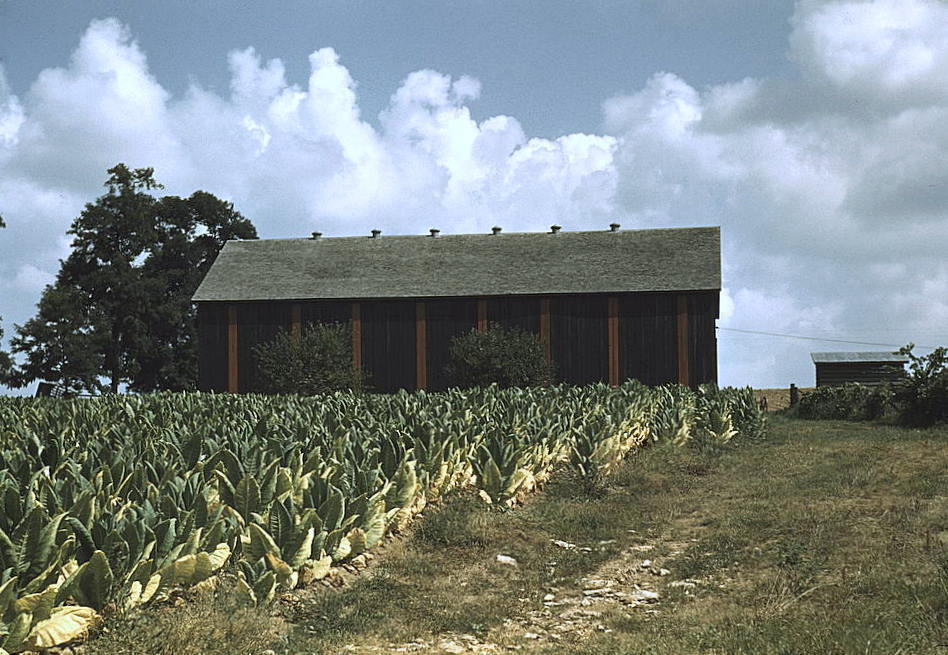
Tobacco barn near Lexington, Kentucky

Barns not involved in animal husbandry were most commonly the crib barn (corn cribs or other types of granaries), storage barns, or processing barns. Crib barns were typically built of unchinked logs, although they were sometimes covered with vertical wood siding. Storage barns often housed unprocessed crops or those awaiting consumption or transport to market. Processing barns were specialized structures that were necessary for helping to actually process the crop.

Tobacco plantations were common in certain parts of Georgia, Kentucky, Missouri, North Carolina, Tennessee, South Carolina, and Virginia. The first agricultural plantations in Virginia were founded on the growing of tobacco. Tobacco production on plantations was very labor-intensive. It required the entire year to gather seeds, start them growing in cold frames, and then transplant the plants to the fields once the soil had warmed. Then the enslaved people had to weed the fields all summer and remove the flowers from the tobacco plants in order to force more energy into the leaves. Harvesting was done by plucking individual leaves over several weeks as they ripened, or cutting entire tobacco plants and hanging them in vented tobacco barns to dry, called curing.

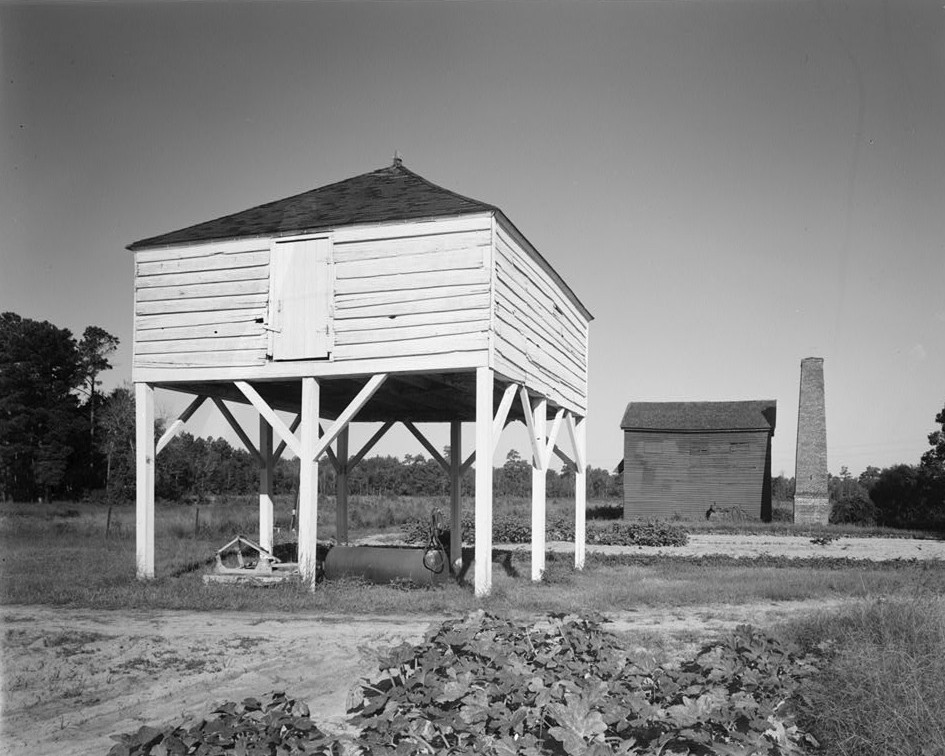
Winnowing barn (foreground) and rice pounding mill (background) at Mansfield Plantation near Georgetown, South Carolina

Rice plantations were common in the South Carolina Lowcountry. Until the 19th century, rice was threshed from the stalks and the husk was pounded from the grain by hand, a very labor-intensive endeavor. Steam-powered rice pounding mills had become common by the 1830s. They were used to thresh the grain from the inedible chaff. A separate chimney, required for the fires powering the steam engine, was adjacent to the pounding mill and often connected by an underground system. The winnowing barn, a building raised roughly a story off of the ground on posts, was used to separate the lighter chaff and dust from the rice.

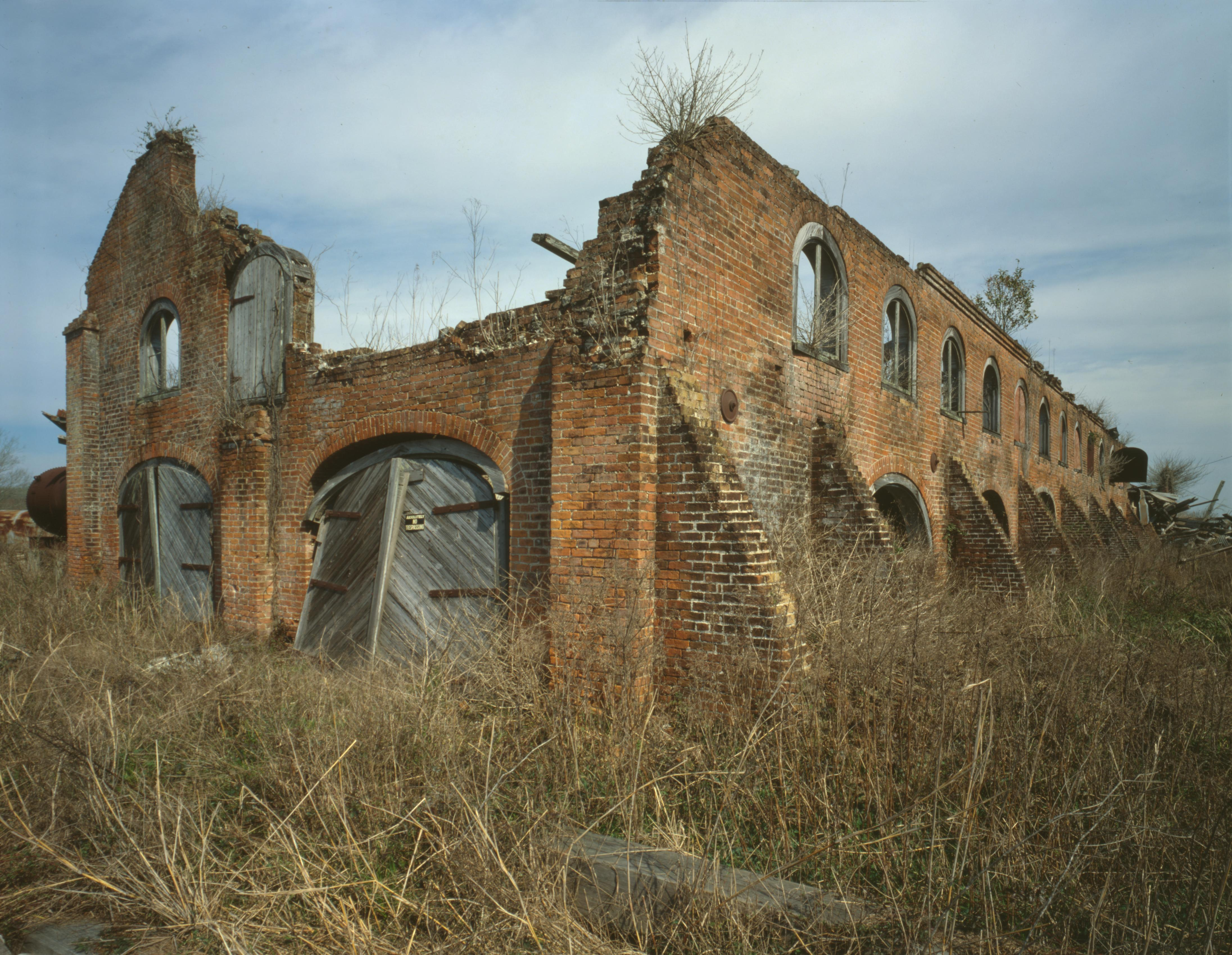
Ruins of a sugar mill at Laurel Valley Plantation in Thibodaux, Louisiana

Sugar plantations were most commonly found in Louisiana. In fact, Louisiana produced almost all of the sugar grown in the United States during the prewar period. From one-quarter to one-half of all sugar consumed in the United States came from Louisiana sugar plantations. Plantations grew sugarcane from Louisiana's colonial era onward, but large scale production did not begin until the 1810s and 1820s. A successful sugar plantation required a skilled retinue of hired labor and enslaved people.

The most specialized structure on a sugar plantation was the sugar mill (sugar house), where by the 1830s the steam-powered mill crushed the sugarcane stalks between rollers. This squeezed the juice from the stalks and the cane juice would run out the bottom of the mill through a strainer to be collected into a tank. From there the juice went through a process that removed impurities from the liquid and thickened it through evaporation. It was steam-heated in vats where additional impurities were removed by adding lime to the syrup and then the mixture was strained. At this point the liquid had been transformed into molasses. It was then placed into a closed vessel known as a vacuum pan, where it was boiled until the sugar in the syrup was crystallized. The crystallized sugar was then cooled and separated from any remaining molasses in a process known as purging. The final step was packing the sugar into hogshead barrels for transport to market.

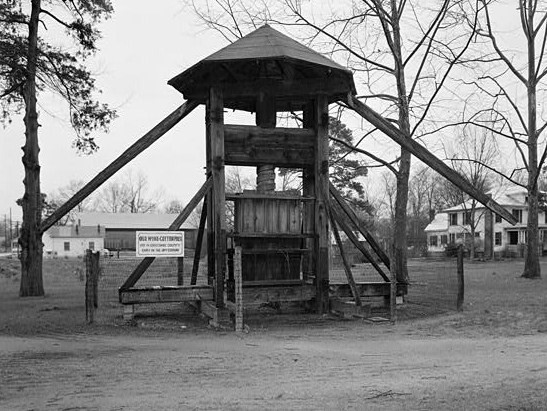
Cotton press from the Norfleet Plantation, now relocated to Tarboro, North Carolina

Cotton plantations, the most common type of plantation in the South prior to the Civil War, were the last type of plantation to fully develop. Cotton production was a very labor-intensive crop to harvest, with the fibers having to be hand-picked from the bolls. This was coupled with the equally laborious removal of seeds from fiber by hand.

Following the invention of the cotton gin, cotton plantations sprang up all over the South and cotton production soared, along with the expansion of slavery. Cotton also caused plantations to grow in size. During the financial panics of 1819 and 1837, when demand by British mills for cotton dropped, many small planters went bankrupt, and their land and slaves were bought by larger plantations. As cotton-producing estates grew in size, so did the number of slaveholders and the average number of enslaved people held.

A cotton plantation normally had a cotton gin house, where the cotton gin was used to remove the seeds from raw cotton. After ginning, the cotton had to be baled before it could be warehoused and transported to market. This was accomplished with a cotton press, an early type of baler that was usually powered by two mules walking in a circle with each attached to an overhead arm that turned a huge wooden screw. The downward action of this screw compressed the processed cotton into a uniform bale-shaped wooden enclosure, where the bale was secured with twine.

== Social and labor organization ==
=== Plantation owner ===
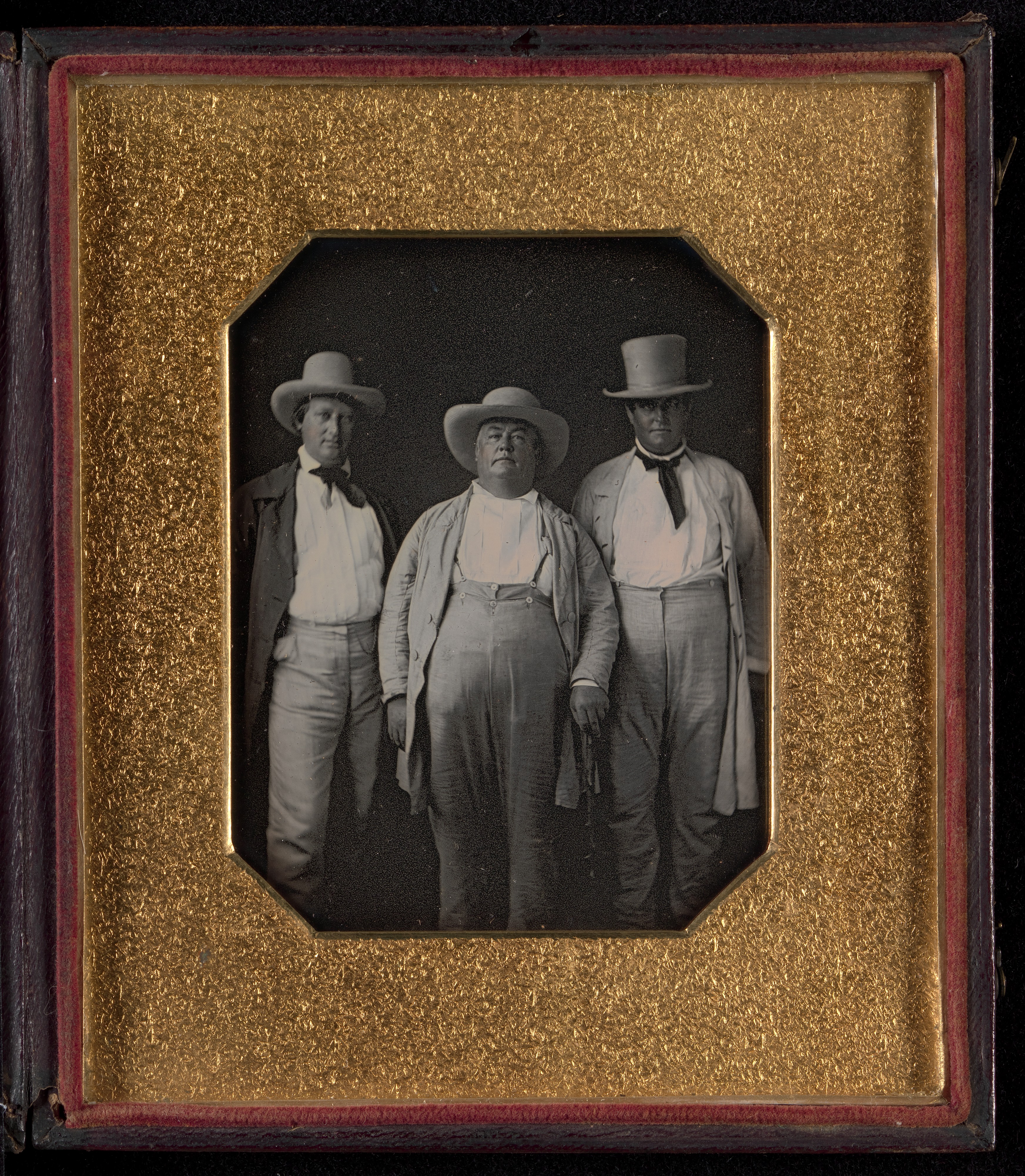
Three planters, after 1845, The Metropolitan Museum of Art

An individual who owned a plantation was known as a planter. Historians of the prewar South have generally defined "planter" most precisely as a person owning property (real estate) and keeping 20 or more people enslaved. In the "Black Belt" counties of Alabama and Mississippi, the terms "planter" and "farmer" were often synonymous.

Historians Robert Fogel and Stanley Engerman define large planters as those who enslaved over 50 people, and medium planters as those who enslaved between 16 and 50 people. Historian David Williams, in A People's History of the Civil War: Struggles for the Meaning of Freedom, suggests that the minimum requirement for planter status was 20 people enslaved, especially since a Southern planter could exempt Confederate duty for one white male per 20 people owned. In his study of Black Belt counties in Alabama, Jonathan Weiner defines planters by ownership of real property, rather than of slaves. A planter, for Weiner, owned at least $10,000 worth of real estate in 1850 and $32,000 worth in 1860, equivalent to about the top eight percent of landowners. In his study of southwest Georgia, Lee Formwalt defines planters in terms of size of land holdings rather than in terms of numbers of people enslaved. Formwalt's planters are in the top 4.5% of landowners, translating into real estate worth $6,000 or more in 1850, $24,000 or more in 1860, and $11,000 or more in 1870. In his study of Harrison County, Texas, Randolph B. Campbell classifies large planters as owners of 20 people, and small planters as owners of between 10 and 19 people. In Chicot and Phillips Counties, Arkansas, Carl H. Moneyhon defines large planters as owners of 20 or more people, and of 600 acres (240 ha) or more.

Many nostalgic memoirs about plantation life were published in the postwar South. For example, James Battle Avirett, who grew up on the Avirett-Stephens Plantation in Onslow County, North Carolina, and served as an Episcopal chaplain in the Confederate States Army, published The Old Plantation: How We Lived in Great House and Cabin before the War in 1901. Such memoirs often include descriptions of Christmas as the epitome of anti-modern order exemplified by the "great house" and extended family.

Novels, often adapted into films, present a romantic, sanitized view of plantation life and ignore or glorify white supremacy. The most popular of these were The Birth of a Nation (1916), based on Thomas Dixon Jr.,'s best-selling novel The Clansman (1905), and Gone with the Wind (1939), based on the best-selling novel of the same name (1936) by Margaret Mitchell.

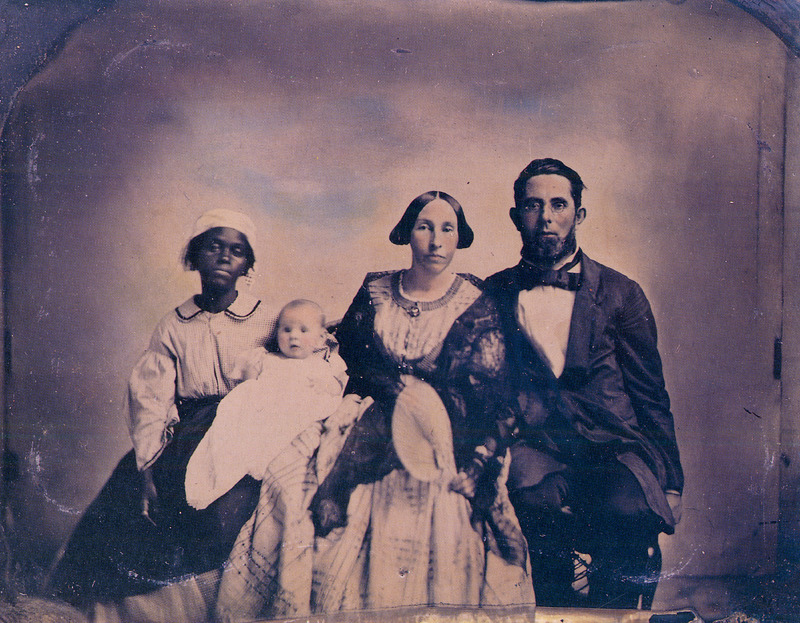
A planter's family with a domestic slave, New Market, Virginia c. 1860

==== Plantation mistress ====
The plantation mistress was the wife of the planter. Upper class daughters in the planter class were expected to marry well and birth children. They held no other roles in the Antebellum South. Girls and women within the planter class moved from one plantation to another, that of her father's then that of her husband's. Plantation owners sometimes allowed their wives and daughters to go to town or other people's houses, but they were mostly confined to their homes. Thought to be more pure and religious than men, these women were put on pedestals and men sought to shelter and protect them.

The work of plantation mistresses varied greatly. Wives of plantation owners focused mainly on the functioning of the household, delegating domestic work done by enslaved individuals. This included tasks like providing clothes to everyone on the complex, medical treatment, upkeep of religious morals, entertaining guests, and producing children. If a complex did not inhabit enough slaves, raising children was the responsibility of the mistress as well. These women were expected to run comforting, welcoming, and efficient homes. Depending on the location of the plantation, the life of a plantation mistress could be socially isolating. A cotton grower in 1833 claimed he gave up on finding a wife because "it would be very difficult to find one who would be willing to go to the wilds of Mississippi and there spend the balance of her life from her friends and relations."

In periods in which the planter was absent, such as wartime (especially during the Civil War), owner's wives were placed in charge of the plantation, although their actual degree of control varied widely.

=== Overseer ===
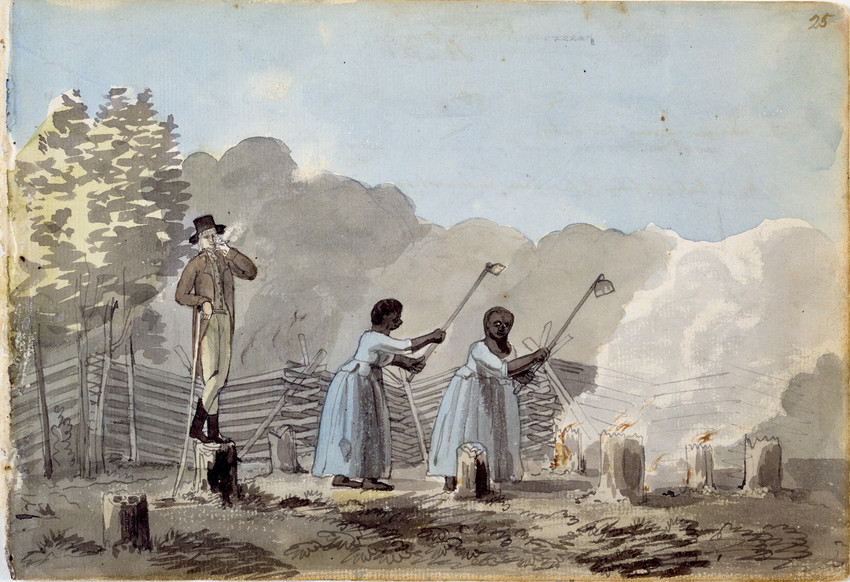
An Overseer Doing His Duty near Fredericksburg, Virginia, a c. 1798 sketch by Benjamin Henry Latrobe

On larger plantations an overseer represented the planter in matters of daily management. The overseer was of "singular importance" on the plantation, as he assumed responsibility for the orderly and profitable operation of the plantation. Overseers were, and remain, inextricably linked to their disciplinarian function vis-a-vis the plantation's enslaved people, being personally responsible for punishing slaves. As a part of the "second rank" of whites on a plantation, overseers usually were drawn from the lower strata of the local white population, and were thus consistently perceived as incompetent, uncouth, brutish, and untrustworthy by planters. Thomas Jefferson, in a letter written to George Washington in 1794, bemoaned "the unprincipled ravages of overseers"; he elsewhere described them as "the most abject, degraded, and unprincipled race". Although white men were predominant in the profession, enslaved men were occasionally promoted to an overseer-type rank (sometimes called "driver"). On larger Deep South plantations with absentee planters, both a white overseer and a black driver could be present.

The overseer rose before the enslaved people and woke them before assigning the day's tasks. He often lived, sometimes with his family, in close proximity to the slave quarters in order to establish control over the enslaved population and to ensure distance from the planter's family. Overseers were responsible for the apportionment of labor and time on the plantation and, as the white man closest to the enslaved, held wide sway over any non-work activities (such as language, religion, and romantic relationships) undertaken by enslaved people. In this capacity, they had the ability to rape enslaved women; mixed-race children arising from such rapes were common. Overseers were also responsible for distributing food, tools, clothing, and medical care to enslaved people, and for ensuring production quotas were met and the produce of slave labor was stored and accounted for appropriately.

As the black proportion of the population, and thus, fear of slave revolts grew in the South during the 18th century, the disciplinarian task of the overseer grew in prominence. Overseers were expected to eliminate any possibility of social disorder through rigid discipline and frequent punishment, particularly by whipping. While overseers were viewed by their employers and detractors alike as brutish, the actual balance of punishment and incentive varied widely from overseer to overseer, depending on what he judged to be the best guarantor of profitability or stability. Nonetheless, overseers enacted the overwhelming majority of punishments experienced by enslaved people. The overseer was also expected to be the first line of defense in the case of enslaved resistance and to coordinate a response to such resistance from the local white population.

=== Enslaved people ===
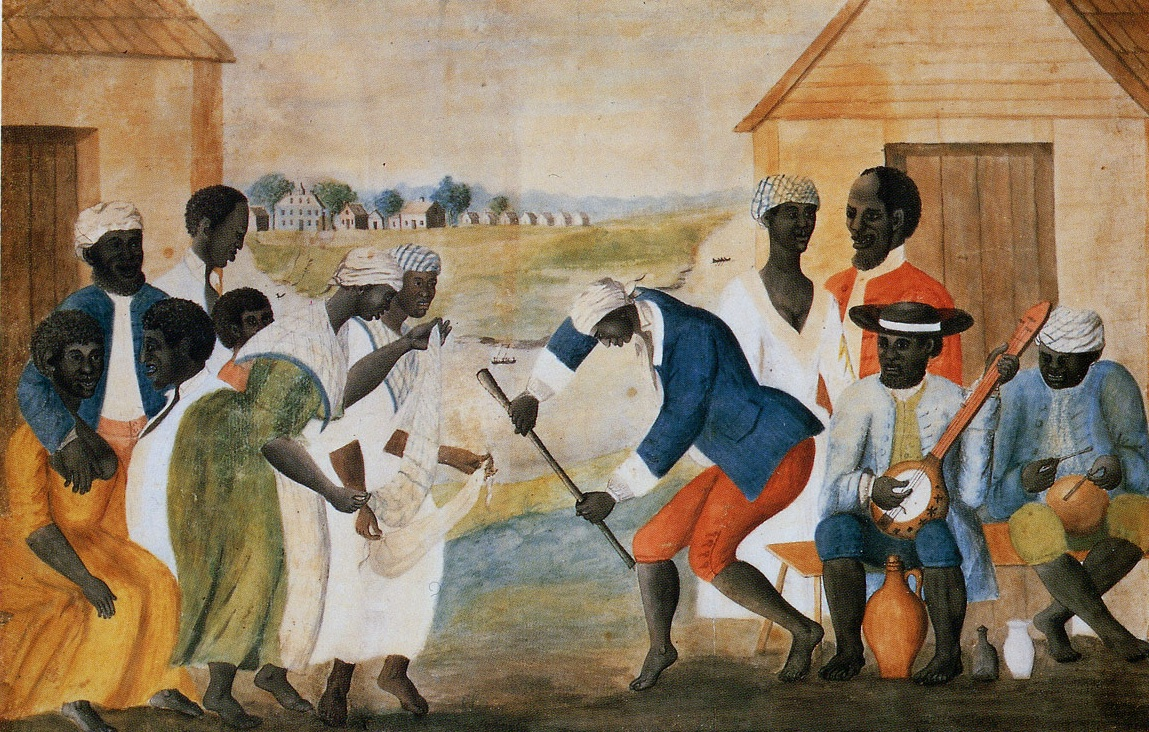
The Old Plantation, a c. 1790 depiction of enslaved people on a South Carolina plantation dancing

With few exceptions, Southern plantations were completely reliant on the labor of enslaved people until the abolition of slavery. The institution of the Southern plantation was relatively synonymous with that of slavery, and the overwhelming majority of enslaved people, some 91% in 1860, worked in the agricultural sector. Enslaved people performed agricultural, culinary, domestic, and other forms of labor which sustained the operation of the plantation and the livelihood of the planter and his family.

Soon after the founding of Jamestown, slaves were already used to perform agricultural work. Initially, most slaves were Native Americans, acquired from slaveholding Native Americans or, once British rule had more firmly been established, captured in slave raids. However, Africans became the predominant enslaved group as early as the mid-17th century, having first arrived in Jamestown in 1619. The formation of plantations in the mid-17th century coincided with the beginning of large-scale slave importation to North America. As these slaves were acquired through the Atlantic slave trade, they were almost exclusively black. Thereafter, the institution was hereditary (inherited according to the status of the mother according to the legal principle of partus sequitur ventrem). Thus, enslaved people in the South were regarded as an exclusively black social caste by the time of the American Revolution.

Enslaved people were expected to work from sunrise to sunset and were assigned tasks based on their physical characteristics, skills, and age. The nature of work depended on the crop cultivated on the plantation; more demanding crops such as sugar required a gang system where enslaved people were grouped in ranks according to their abilities, while smaller plantations often mingled free and enslaved labor, with less rigorous task systems employed. On plantation complexes, enslaved people mostly lived in slave quarters. Agricultural slaves were usually not given an education and socialized around their fellow enslaved people. They were usually instructed in the christian faith of their masters, usually under the supervision of a white minister. As enslaved people were considered items of property, they could be punished and incentivized at the liberty of the planter, with the lash being the most typical tool of punishment by overseers. While enslaved people could be owned by the same plantation for generations, they could be sold at a whim based on the financial condition of the plantation and the needs of the planter. Manumission, the freeing of an enslaved person by their master, occurred relatively rarely, particularly after the invention of the cotton gin (accounting for 0.0005% of the total enslaved population in 1850), and for a number of reasons. These could vary from a moral decision on the part of the enslaver to a business decision to release old, unfirm, or otherwise "unproductive" enslaved people from the enslaver's responsibility. Upon freedom, former enslaved people were often encouraged or forced to leave their former area of residence, either for a free state or for Liberia.

== After emancipation ==
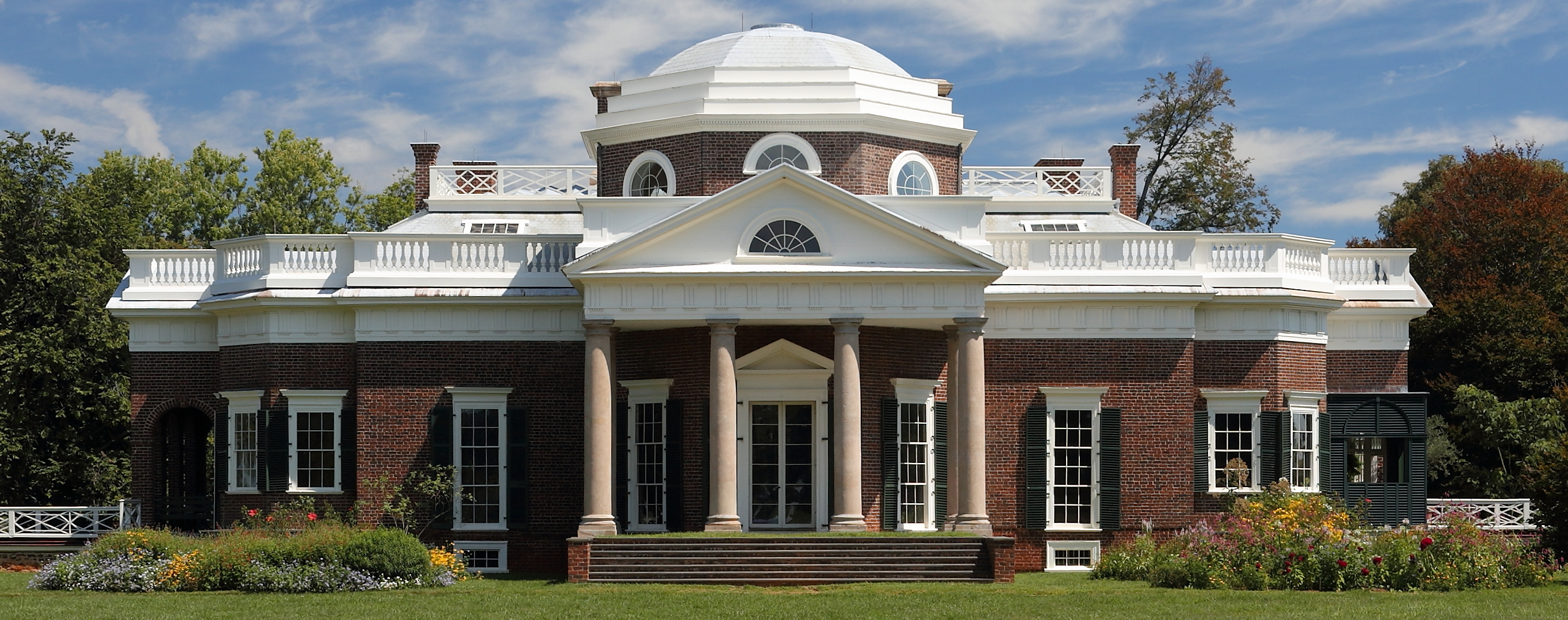
Monticello, located outside Charlottesville, Virginia, was the primary plantation house of Thomas Jefferson and is now a major tourist attraction.

Following the Civil War, many plantation complexes fell into disrepair, as slave wealth was nullified by the Thirteenth Amendment. While many former slaves were retained on plantation complexes as sharecroppers, the foundational mechanisms which ensured the operation of such complexes as centralized, self-sufficient institutions were no longer viable, as black ex-slaves were able to leave if they wished and necessary labor investment was markedly higher than before the war. Additionally, tenant farmers were less productive than enslaved workers under the gang system. Land prices, agricultural production, and agricultural productivity fell across the South in the decades following the Civil War, particularly in the Deep South.

Generally, the wealth of the former slave-owning planter class fully recovered to its pre-Civil War levels within a generation of emancipation. However, former planters and their descendants often made their fortunes in industrial or mercantile settings. The vast complexes which were reliant on slavery were no longer tenable, even if agriculture continued on many plantation sites. While many of the greatest plantation houses survived, the overwhelming majority of ancillary buildings described in this article disappeared from lack of use and utility in the century following emancipation.

=== Tourism ===
While Gone With The Wind and other pieces of "Lost Cause"-based media changed public perceptions of Southern plantations, many of the first "tourist plantations" were founded in reaction to financial strains posed by the Great Depression on the owners of plantation complexes. Houses, often still in the ownership of their former slaveholding families, began to be marketed as accommodations, museums, or both to pay for their upkeep. Both of these potential presentations usually excluded the complex as it existed outside of the Big House, and mentions of slavery were minimal or completely absent. Slave quarters were sometimes retained and restored but often as residences for tourists; in other cases, their use as lodgings for enslaved people was minimized or ignored altogether.

Other former plantations were acquired by county, state and federal governments as historic preservation became a goal in the second half of the 20th century; such acquisitions were usually made museums, although the presentation of slavery at them varied. Hundreds of former plantations exist as museums, historic sites, or forms of public accommodation. The majority prioritize the plantation house, and surviving portions of other parts of the complex are rare. Likewise, mention of slavery at such sites was generally rare, although this has changed in the 21st century. A 2022 study found that 375 plantations exist as publicly or privately owned museums, across 19 states. The highest concentrations of such museums were in southern Virginia, coastal South Carolina, and along the Mississippi River in Louisiana and southern Mississippi.

In the 21st century, and more intensely following the "racial reckoning" following the murder of George Floyd, former plantation sites have begun to acknowledge and emphasize the role of slavery in their operations. These include publicly owned museums, such as Mount Vernon and Monticello, and privately owned sites such as McLeod Plantation and Whitney Plantation. The latter two sites are known for prioritizing narratives of enslavement over those of planters and the "Big House" altogether. Some aspects of "plantation tourism" have become the subject of scorn and condemnation: in late 2019, after contact initiated by Color of Change, "five major websites often used for wedding planning have pledged to cut back on promoting and romanticizing weddings at former slave plantations". The New York Times, earlier in 2019, "decided...to exclude couples who were being married on plantations from wedding announcements and other wedding coverage". The destruction of Nottaway Plantation, by some accounts the largest surviving plantation house in the south and a resort, by fire in 2025 prompted celebration from many black people and commentators.

=== Ruin ===
After the collapse of the slavery regime, many plantation owners could no longer afford to maintain their grand homes. Often located in rural areas prone to alluvial flooding and lacking rapid-response fire brigades, many plantation complex big houses either fell to ruin or caught fire and burned to the foundation stones.

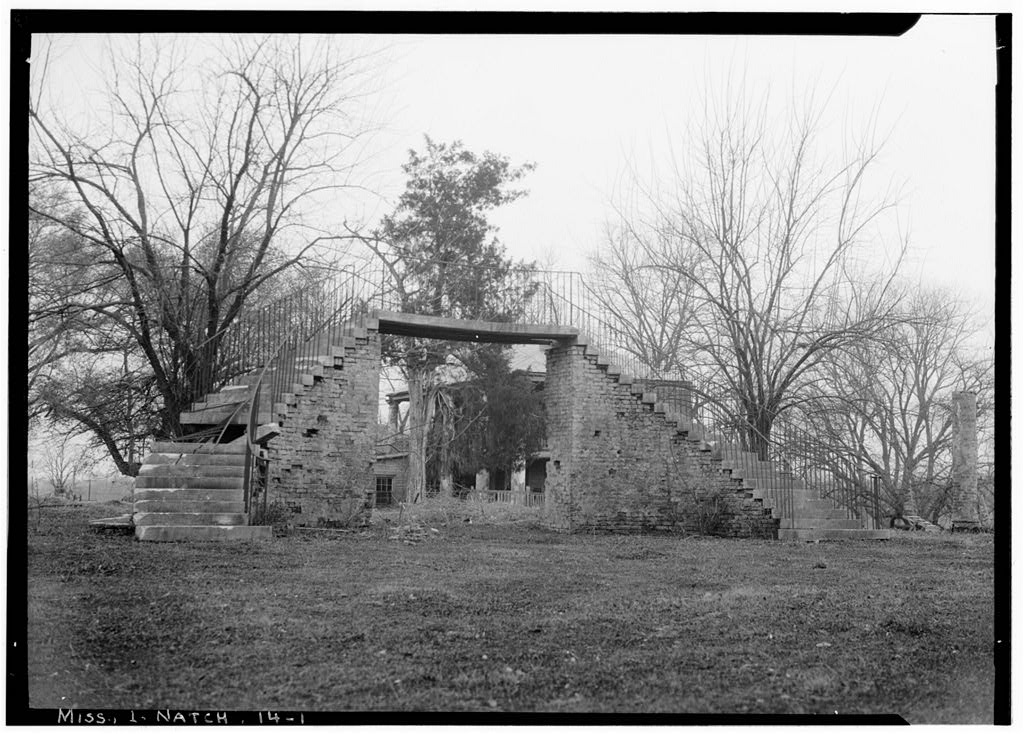
Ruins of Concord, near Natchez, Mississippi; constructed in the 1810s, burned 1901

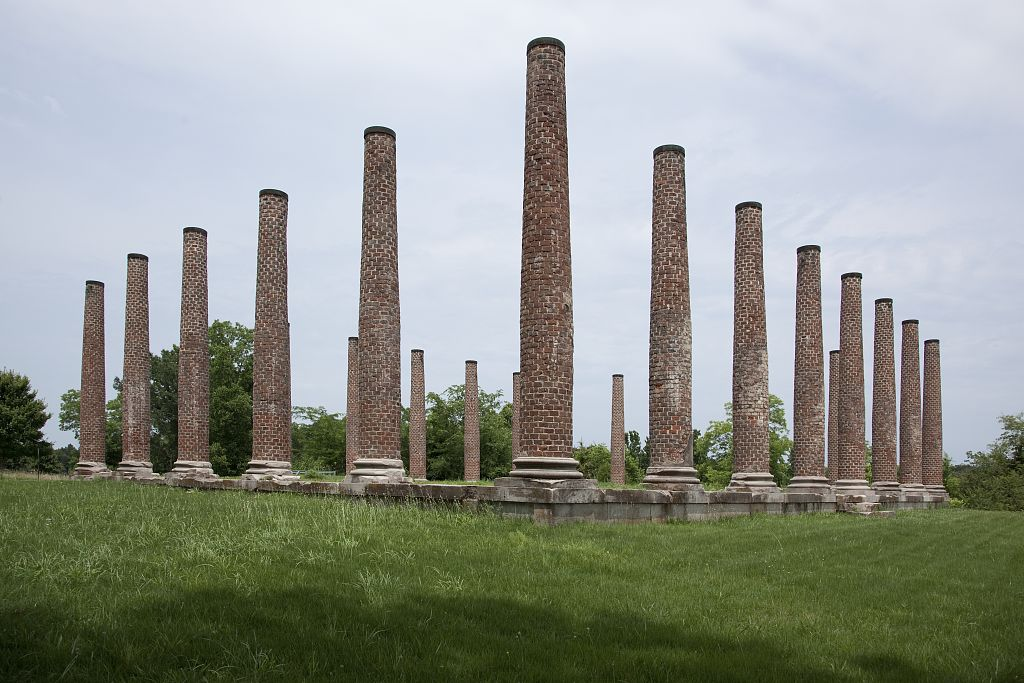
Ruins of the Forks of Cypress, near Florence, Alabama, built 1830s, burned 1960s

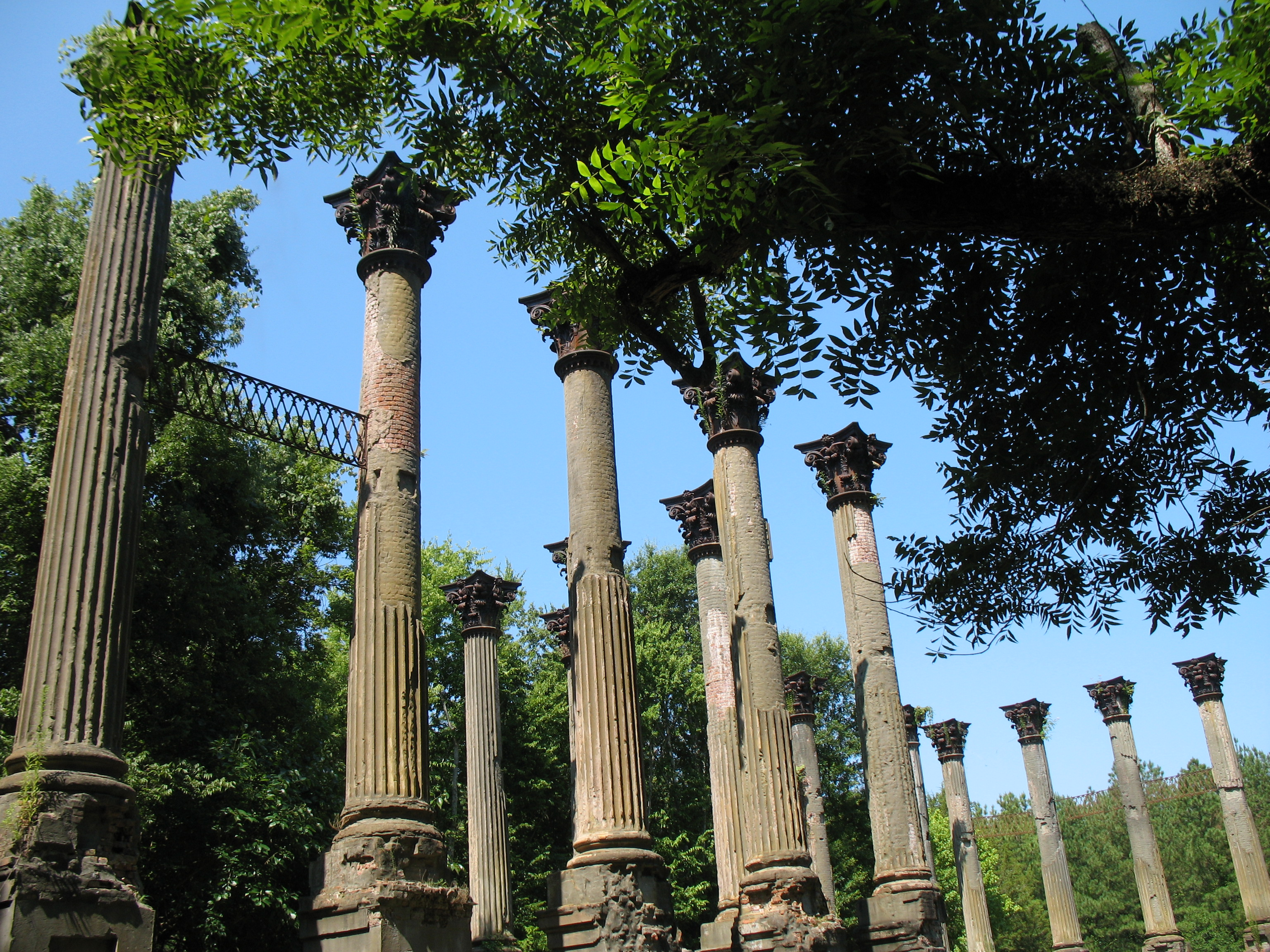
Windsor Ruins, near Natchez, Mississippi, house built 1850s, burned 1890s

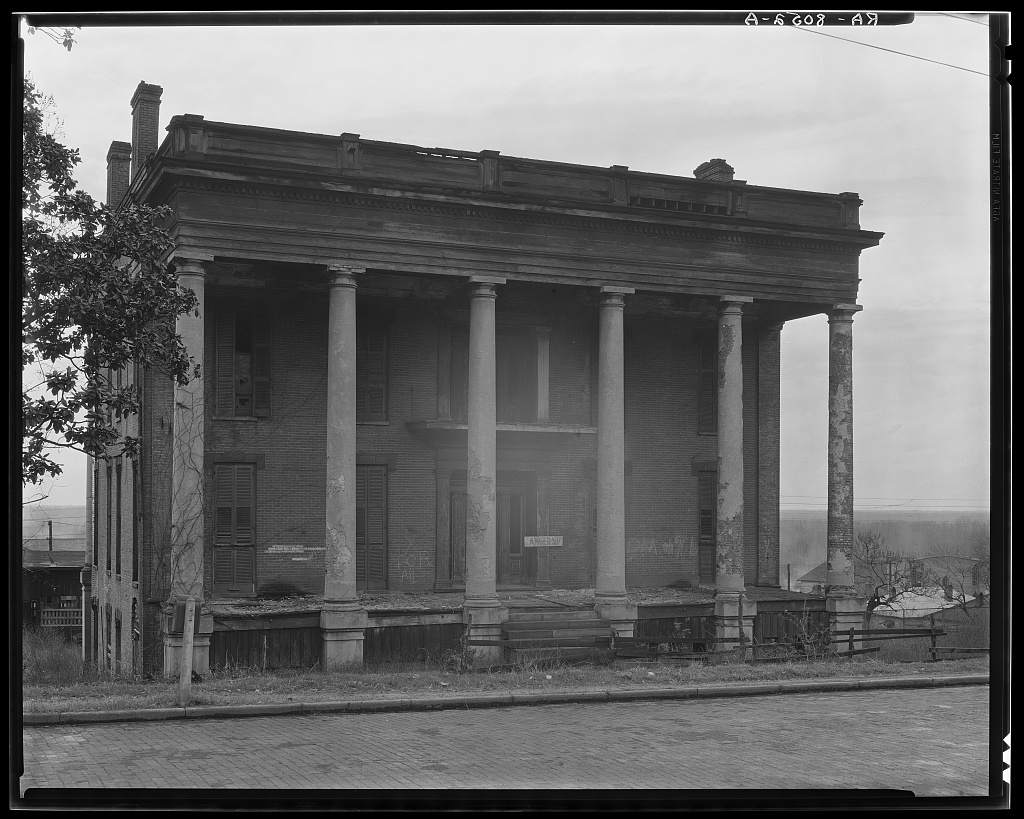
Shamrock, aka the William Porterfield House, Vicksburg, Mississippi, photographed by Walker Evans, 1936

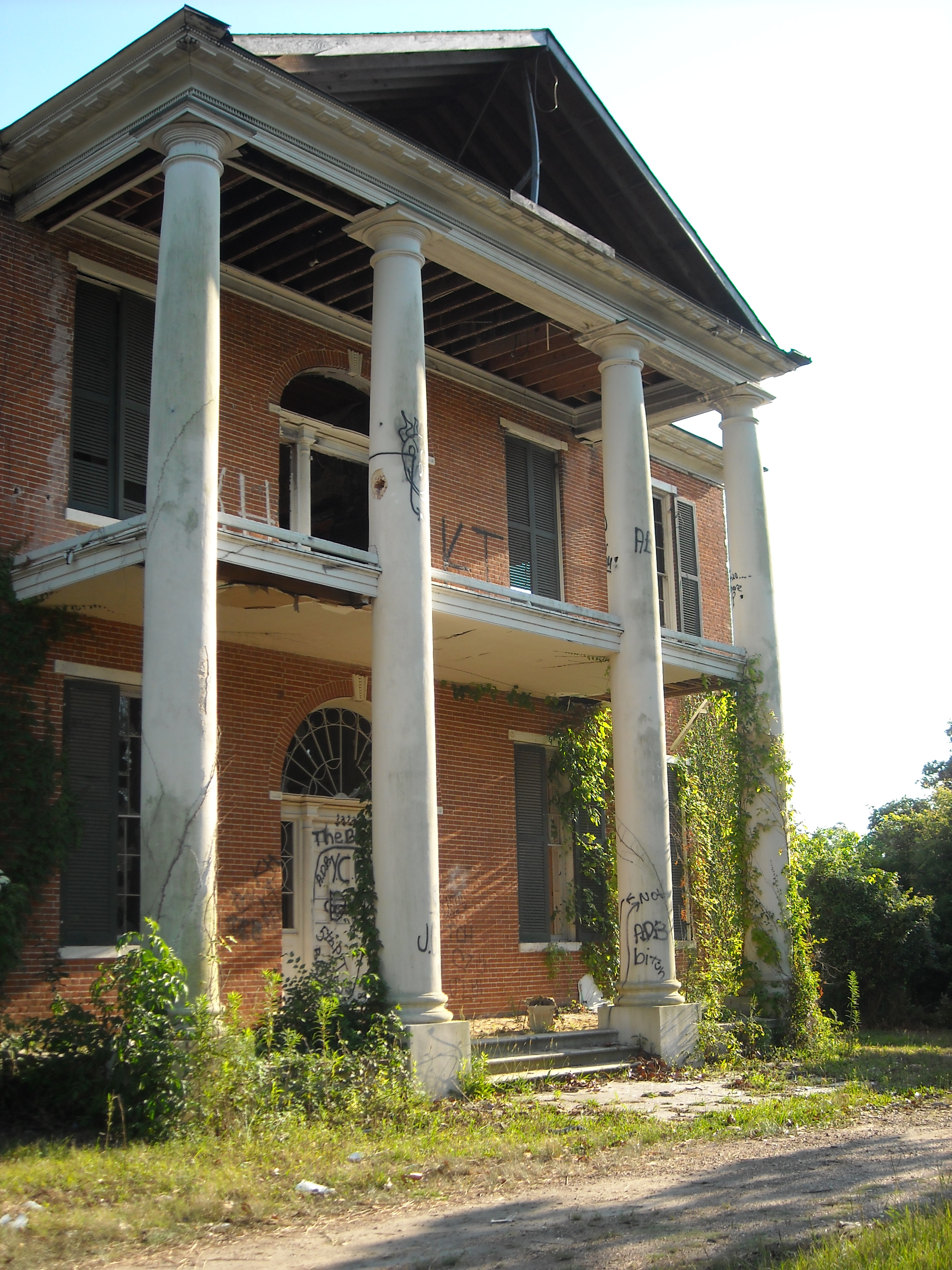
A historically significant cache of domestic slave-trade documents was found at Arlington; the current owner has been fined for "demolition by neglect"

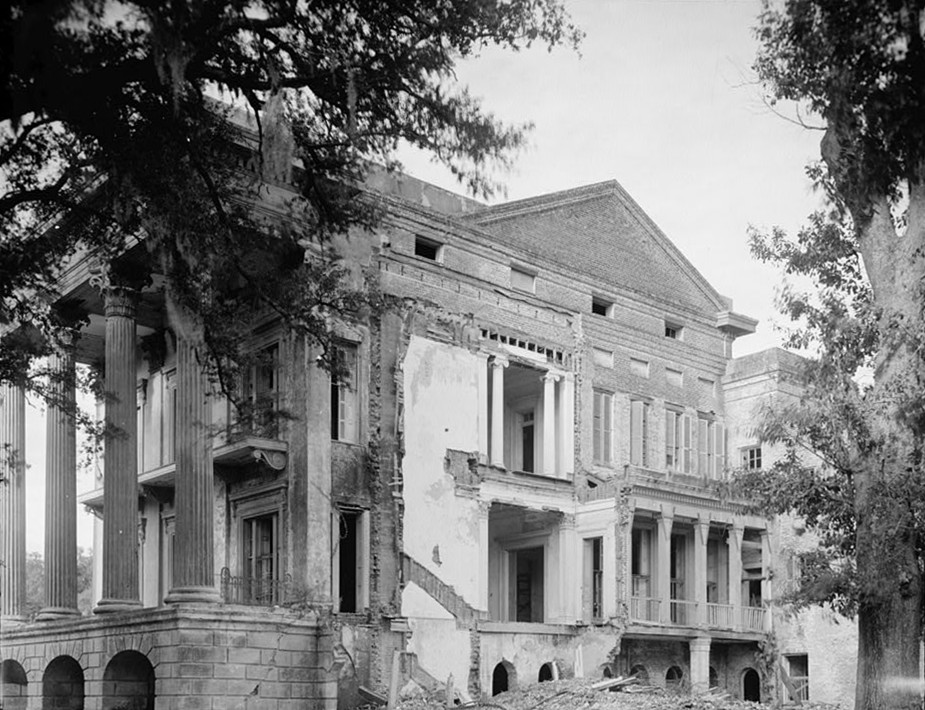
The rear wing of Belle Grove in Iberville Parish had collapsed and the building rotted from within long before it burned down in 1952

== See also ==
- African-American history
- American gentry
- Atlantic slave trade
- Casa-Grande & Senzala (similar concept in Brazilian plantations)
- Journal of a Residence on a Georgian Plantation in 1838–1839
- List of plantations in the United States
- Lost Cause of the Confederacy
- Plain Folk of the Old South (1949 book by historian Frank Lawrence Owsley)
- Plantation-era songs
- Plantation tradition (genre of literature)
- Commons:Category:Old maps of plantations in the United States
