= Reunion Golf and Country Club =

- Interactive map of Reunion Golf and Country Club
- 32.5121474°N 90.1863971°W

Club information
- Location: Madison, Mississippi, U.S.
- Established: 2006
- Type: Private
- Owner: Evergreen Partners
- Operator: Evergreen Partners
- Tota holes: 18
- Website: reunionms.com
- Designed by: Bob Cupp
- Par: 72

Reunion Golf and Country Club is a country club and neighborhood in Madison, Mississippi. The facility includes sports such as tennis, golf, and swimming.

== History ==
The country club's land was first settled in the 1800s by John Taylor Johnstone, who immigrated from North Carolina and established several forced-labor farms. He apparently was "reminded" of Scotland when he settled the land.

In the 1990s, David H. Nutt, an attorney and now richest person in Mississippi, acquired 2,100 acres of land on what used to be Johnstone's estate. The first homes were built in the 2000s, and the first clubhouse was built in 2004.

In 2006, Reunion's administration started plans for a bigger, more luxurious clubhouse. Multiple changes were made to the plans, and construction began in 2015. Its inspiration was Annandale Home, which now serves as Reunion Hall, locally known as the "White House". The Reunion Property Owners' Association is headquartered there. Annandale Hall was built in the late 1800s, for the aforementioned Johnstone family. It was burned down in 1920, and was rebuilt thereafter.

== Golf course ==
Reunion's 18-hole, par-72 golf course was designed by Bob Cupp in 2004. Its fairways are made by TifEagle and its greens are made by TifSport. The club has also installed a set of US Kids Family tees on the course.

== Other sports ==
For tennis, Reunion has nine Har-Tru clay courts that are open for day and night play. Reunion is also the host of seven JLTA teams, more than 15 social mixers, three sanctioned junior tournaments, and more. Reunion's swimming pool is next to the clubhouse.
