= Chapel of the Cross (Mannsdale, Mississippi) =

Historic church in Mississippi, United States

- U.S. National Register of Historic Places
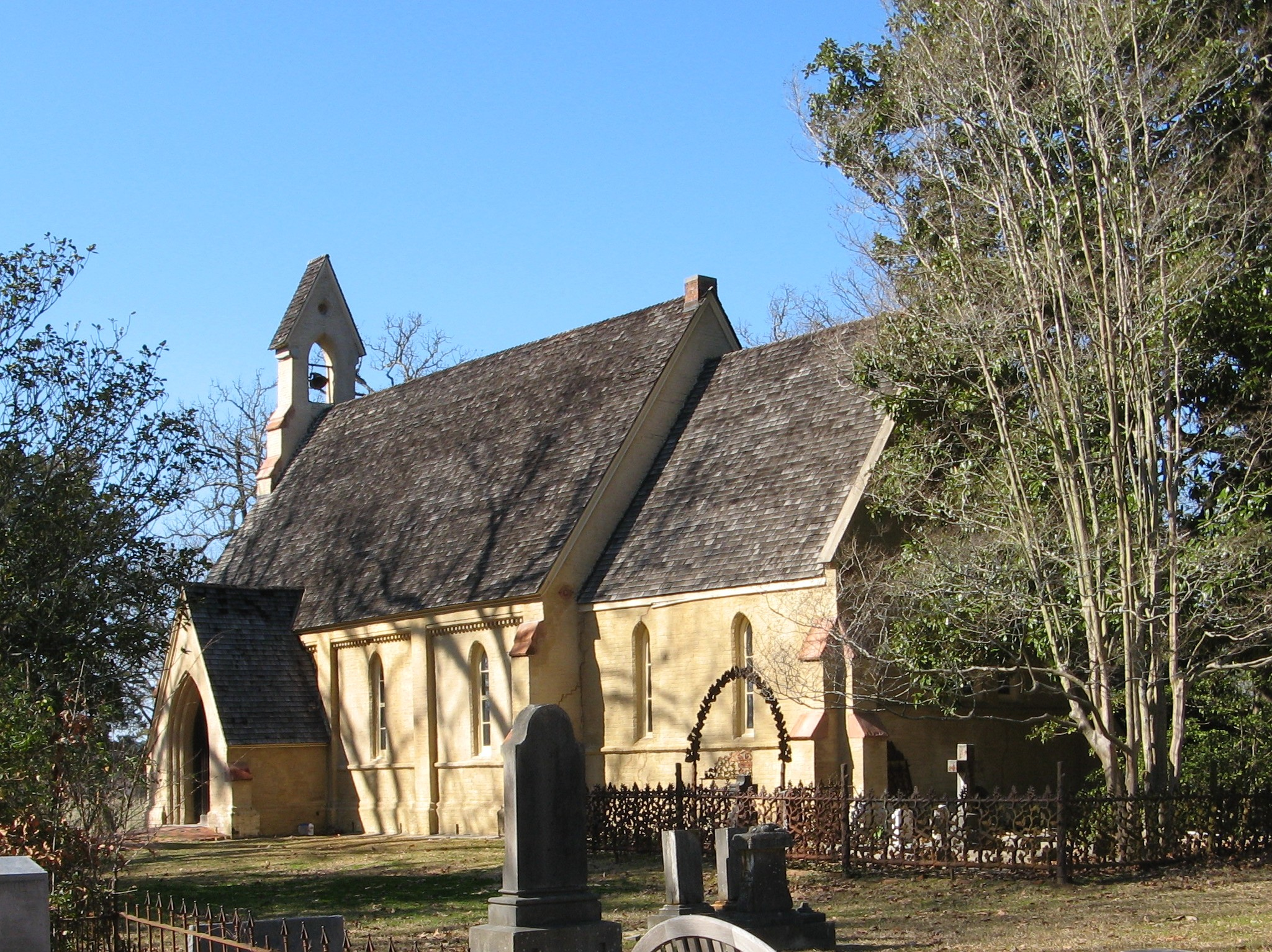

- Location within Mississippi Location within the United States
- Location: 674 Mannsdale Road; Madison, Mississippi
- Coordinates: 32°31′18″N 90°11′24″W
- Area: 10 acres (4.0 ha)
- Built: 1850–52
- Architectural style: Gothic Revival
- Website: http://chapelofthecrossms.org/
- NRHP reference No.: 72000698
- Added to NRHP: June 13, 1972

The Chapel of the Cross is a historic Episcopal church in the Mannsdale area of Madison, Mississippi. The brick structure was built circa 1850–52 by enslaved people. It is noted for its Gothic Revival architecture, which draws heavily from 14th-century English country churches. It was added to the National Register of Historic Places in 1972.

== History ==
The church was originally conceived as a house of worship for the Johnstone family on their Annandale Plantation, now destroyed. John T. Johnstone migrated from North Carolina to Madison County, Mississippi, in 1819 and established Annandale. Tradition maintains that Johnstone was descended from the Johnstone family that once held the title Earl of Annandale and Hartfell in the Peerage of Scotland and that he named his plantation in their honor. He had envisioned a chapel for the plantation, but died in 1848. After his death his widow Margaret began making plans for the construction of the church.

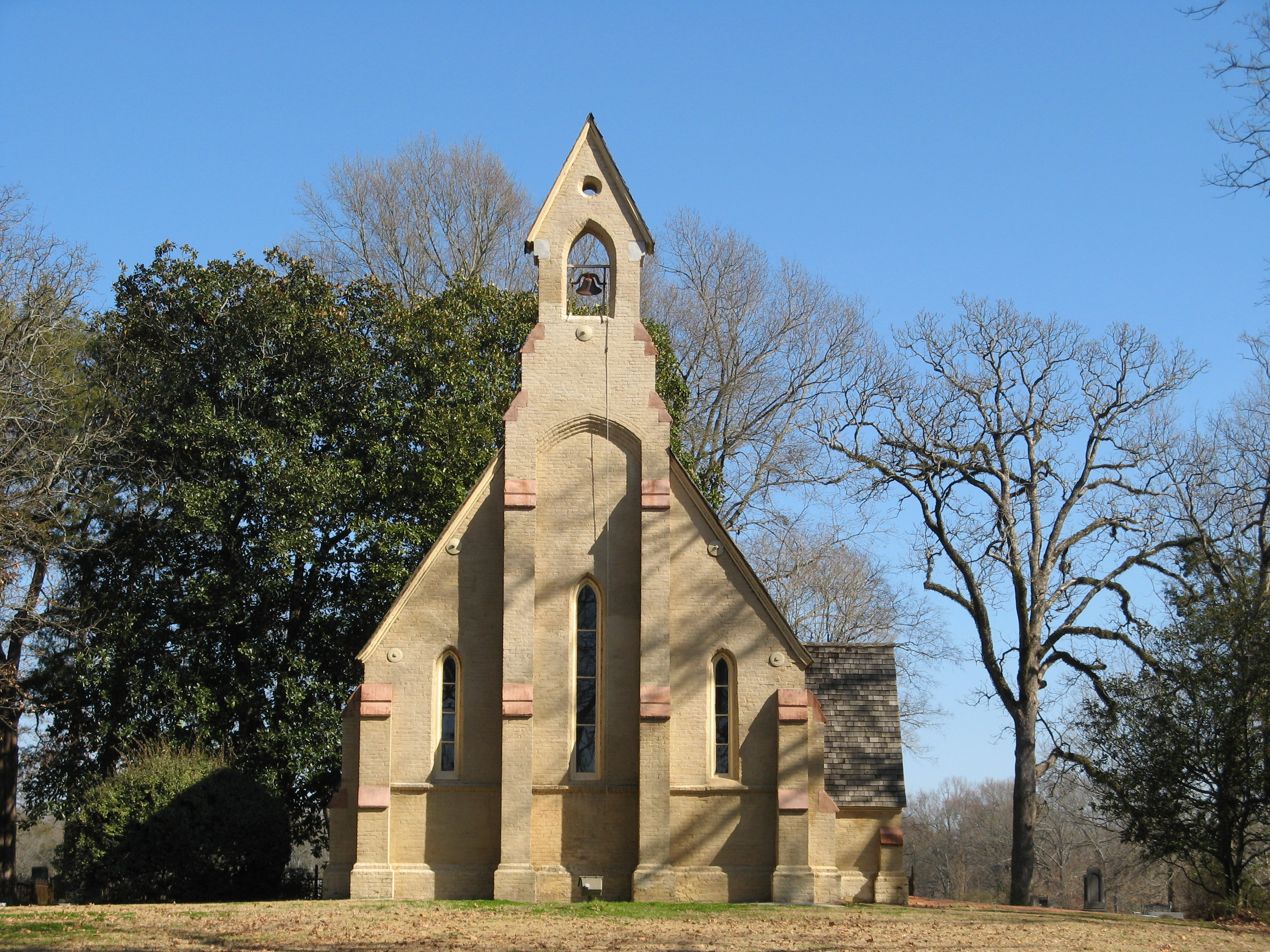
Front elevation

Almost no primary records for the construction of the church survive, but it is commonly believed by architectural scholars that English-born architect Frank Wills designed the Chapel of the Cross for Margaret Johnstone. What is certain is that a sketch by Wills of an almost identical church, entitled "Sketch of a First-pointed church," appeared in the October 1849 issue of the New York Ecclesiologist. Practically identical churches by Richard Upjohn are also known, such as his St. Thomas Episcopal Church (c.1849) in New York City and St. Mary's Episcopal Church (c.1847) in Rhode Island. Johnstone had much of the work on the church performed by people who were enslaved by her and imprisoned on her plantation Slavery in the United States; they made all of the bricks by hand on-site. The rest of the construction was handled by hired artisans, with Johnstone spending a total of $3,000. She deeded the church and 10 acres (4.0 ha) to the Episcopal Diocese of Mississippi in June 1851. The building was consecrated on September 19, 1852, by William Mercer Green, the first Episcopal bishop of Mississippi.

Margaret Johnstone died in 1880 and her plantation was sold. The grand three-story, 40-room Italianate-style Annandale mansion, built by her in the mid-1850s, was unoccupied for some time and burned down on September 9, 1924.

After Johnstone's death, the diocese alternated between using the church and keeping it inactive. It declared the parish extinct in 1903. Margaret Britton Parsons, a granddaughter of John and Margaret Johnstone, persuaded the diocese to reactivate the church as a house of worship in 1911, and it was restored to the diocese in 1914. Since that time, priests have taken charge of operations. The diocese started a restoration of the chapel in 1956. In 1979, a few years after the addition of the church to the National Register of Historic Places, the United States Department of the Interior awarded a $50,000 grant to finish the restoration.

== Folklore ==
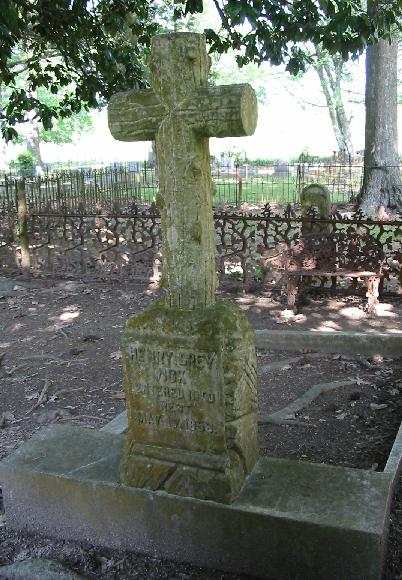
The gravestone of Henry Grey Vick in the churchyard.

The church has a ghost story associated with it that has been chronicled in two books and one booklet. The Chapel of the Cross and Annandale are featured in the short story, "The Ghosts of Annandale", in Jeffrey introduces 13 more Southern ghosts by Kathryn Tucker Windham. It details two distinct ghost stories. The first is that of Annie Devlin, a former governess who died at the Annandale mansion in June 1860 and was purported to haunt it until the night it burned in 1924. The second is that of Helen Johnstone and her fiancé, Henry Grey Vick. Helen, the youngest daughter of John and Margaret, and Henry, descended from the founder of Vicksburg, met at her sister's home, Ingleside, in December 1855. They became engaged to be married in 1857, with the day set for May 21, 1859. Vick was subsequently killed in a duel in Mobile, Alabama on May 17, 1859. His body was brought back to Annandale and buried in the churchyard to the rear of the church. It is claimed in the story that the ghost of Helen now weeps at his grave. The same folklore is repeated in Norman and Scott's Historic Haunted America and again in Jan Warner's booklet Shadows of a Chapel.
