= Iveson B. Noland =

American prelate

The Right Reverend Iveson Batchelor Noland D.D.
- Bishop of Louisiana
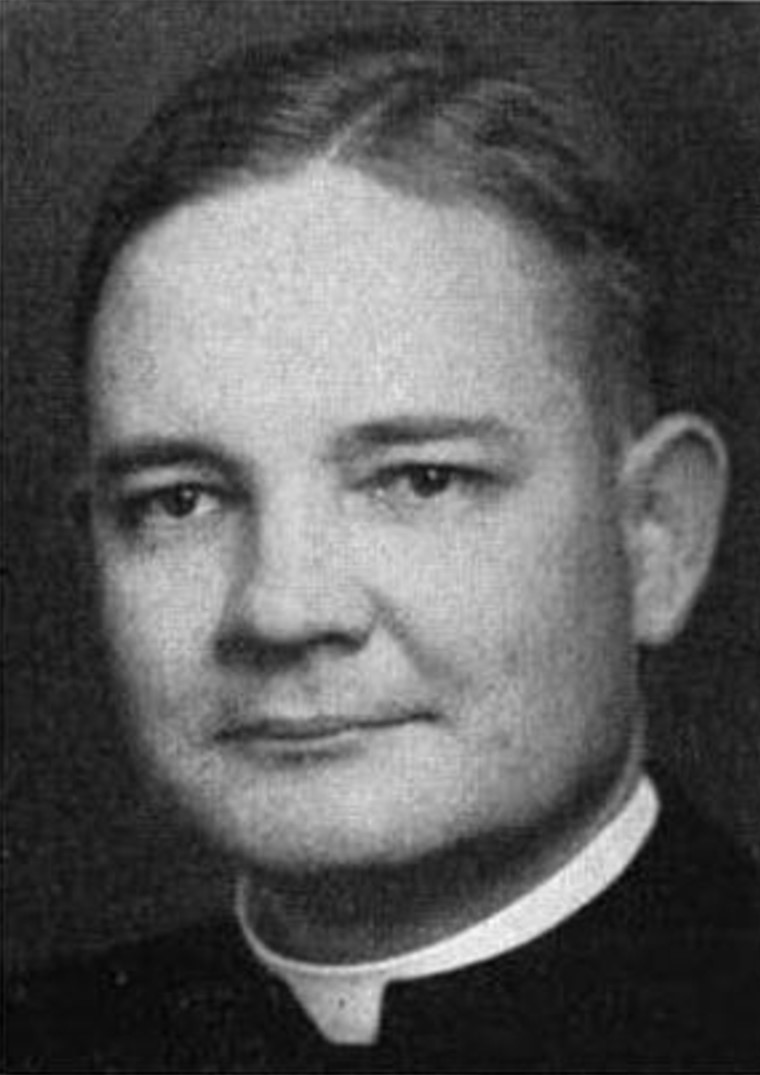
- Church: Episcopal Church
- Diocese: Louisiana
- In office: 1969–1975
- Predecessor: Girault M. Jones
- Successor: James Brown
- Previous posts: Suffragan Bishop of Louisiana (1952-1961); Coadjutor Bishop of Louisiana (1961-1969)

Orders
- Ordination: October 1940 by John Long Jackson
- Consecration: October 1, 1952 by Girault M. Jones

Personal details
- Born: September 10, 1916 Baton Rouge, Louisiana, United States
- Died: June 24, 1975 (aged 58) New York City, United States
- Buried: Christ Church Cathedral (New Orleans)
- Denomination: Anglican
- Spouse: Nell Killgore Burden
- Children: 3
- Education: Louisiana State University

Iveson Batchelor Noland (September 10, 1916 – June 24, 1975) was an American prelate who served as the Bishop of Louisiana from 1969 to 1975.

== Early life and education ==
Noland was born on September 10, 1916, in Baton Rouge, Louisiana, the son of Ives Batchelor Noland and Camille Reynaud. He attended Louisiana State University and graduated with a B.A. in 1937. In 1940 he graduated with a Bachelor of Divinity from Sewanee: The University of the South and with a Doctor of Divinity in 1952.

== Ordination ==
Noland was ordained deacon in November 1939 by William Mercer Green, and served as curate in St James' Church in Baton Rouge, Louisiana. After his ordination to the priesthood in October 1940, he was appointed rector of Trinity Church in Natchitoches, Louisiana. He also served as U.S. Army Chaplain between 1941 and 1946 and subsequently served as priest-in-charge of St Paul's Church in Winnfield, Louisiana. In 1946 he became rector of the Church of the Holy Comforter in Charlotte, North Carolina. In 1950 he transferred to Lake Charles, Louisiana as rector of the Church of the Good Shepherd, a post he held until 1952. He also served as chairman of the diocesan Department of Christian Relations between 1950 and 1953.

== Episcopacy ==
Noland was elected Suffragan Bishop of Louisiana in May 1952. He was the first suffragan of Louisiana. Noland was consecrated on October 1, 1952, by Bishop Girault M. Jones in Christ Church Cathedral. As suffragan he was responsible for youth and college work and for the layman's program in the Diocese. He was elected to succeed Bishop Jones as Coadjutor in 1961 and succeeded as Diocesan on September 1, 1969.

== Death ==
Noland was one of the 113 people who died in the Eastern Air Lines Flight 66 plane crash on June 24, 1975, on its way to New York.

== Personal life ==
Noland married Nell Killgore Burden on February 3, 1936, and together had three sons.

== See also ==
- Eastern Air Lines Flight 66, on which Noland died
- UpStairs Lounge arson attack, in which Noland rebuked one of his clergymen for conducting a prayer service for victims in the aftermath
