= Alice Barbee Castleman =

American philanthropist and suffragist (1843–1926)

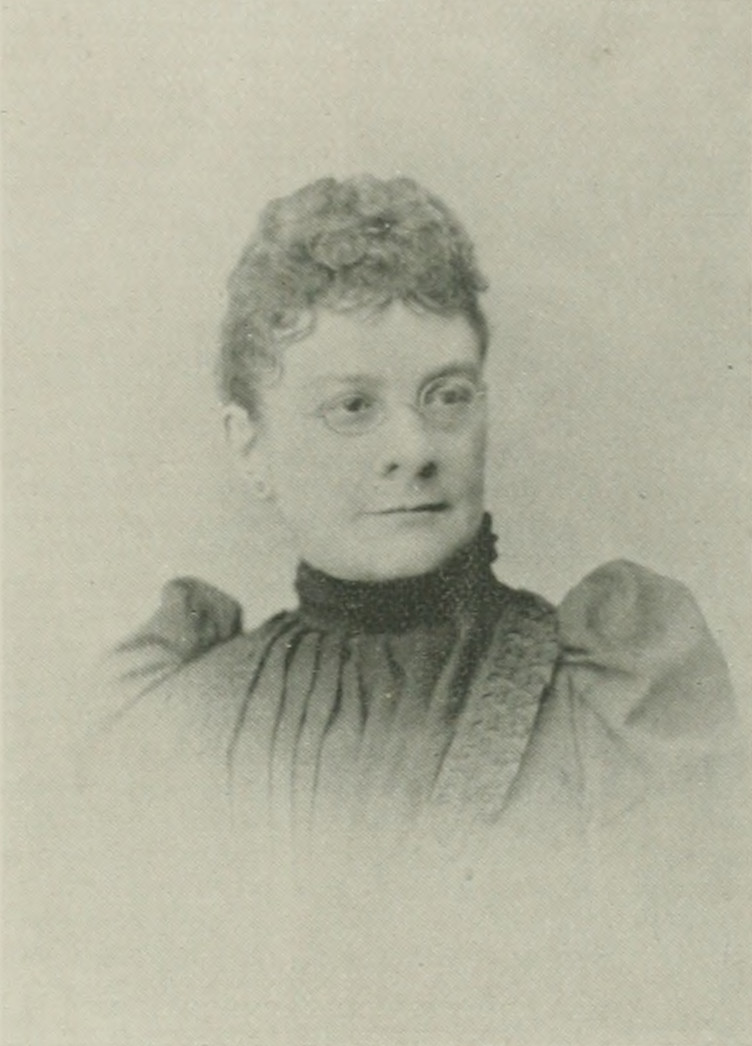
- Portrait from "A Woman of the Century"
- Born: Alice Osmond Barbee; December 5, 1843; Louisville, Kentucky, U.S.
- Died: February 5, 1926 (aged 82); Eau Gallie, Florida, U.S.
- Resting place: Cave Hill Cemetery, Louisville
- Occupations: Social leader, philanthropist, and suffragist
- Spouse: John Breckinridge Castleman (m. 1868; died 1918)
- Children: 5
- Father: John Barbee
- Relatives: John Nicholas Galleher (brother-in-law)

Alice Barbee Castleman (née Barbee; December 5, 1843 – February 5, 1926) was an American social leader, philanthropist, and suffragist. She was known throughout the country for her activities in political and civic endeavors.

== Early life and education ==
Alice Osmond Barbee was born in Louisville, Kentucky, December 5, 1843. She was the daughter of former Louisville mayor, John Barbee, and Eliza (Kane) Barbee. Her father and mother were native Kentuckians and were numbered among the early pioneers. She was their oldest daughter. Alice's sister, Lottie, married John Nicholas Galleher, who became the third bishop of the Episcopal Diocese of Louisiana.

She was educated in the East.

== Career ==
Although she was a social leader, she made time for charitable work and was a philanthropist in the broadest sense. Always on the alert to advance the cause of woman, she was progressive, cultured and liberal in her views. She was president of the board of the Louisville Training School for Nurses. She was a prominent member of the Woman's Club, a member of the Woman's Auxiliary of the Board of Missions, Foreign and Domestic, and a member of the National Board of Lady Managers of the World's Columbian Exposition. She was active in the affairs of the Filson Club of Louisville.

Castleman and her husband were early supporters of the suffrage movement. She was the first vice president of the Kentucky Equal Rights Association in 1910, and 1911. Gen. Castleman supported his wife financially and emotionally in her battle to secure voting rights for all women at a time when it was unpopular, even dangerous, to do so. According to National American Woman Suffrage Association records, Mrs. Castleman was a delegate for the Kentucky Equal Rights Association when they were lobbying for the passage of what became known as the "Susan B. Anthony Amendment" during the 65th and 66th sessions of Congress.

She was one of 17 women who were elected as delegates to the 1920 Democratic National Convention at San Francisco when James M. Cox was nominated for President.

== Personal life ==
She married Gen. John Breckinridge Castleman on November 24, 1868. They had five children, three sons and two daughters: David C. Castleman (1870–1911), Elise Kane. Castleman (1871–1938), Breckenridge Castleman (1874–1912), Kenneth Galleher Castleman (1876–1954), and Alice Barbee Castleman (1877–1949). From 1891 till 1907, she made her home at 1321 South Fourth Street, Louisville.

In religion, she was an Episcopalian and a member of Christ Church, of Louisville.

Alice Barbee Castleman died February 5, 1926, at her winter home in Eau Gallie, Florida. Burial was at Cave Hill Cemetery in Louisville.
