= Morris King Thompson =

American Episcopal bishop (born 1955)

The Right Reverend Morris King Thompson
- Bishop of Louisiana
- Church: Episcopal Church
- Diocese: Louisiana
- Elected: December 5, 2009
- In office: 2010–2022
- Predecessor: Charles Jenkins
- Successor: Shannon Rogers Duckworth

Orders
- Ordination: 1981 (Baptist minister); 1990 (Anglican deacon); 1991 (Anglican priest)
- Consecration: May 8, 2010 by Katharine Jefferts Schori

Personal details
- Born: 1955 (age 70–71) Cleveland, Mississippi, US
- Denomination: Anglican (prev. Presbyterian, then Baptist)
- Spouse: Rebecca Thompson
- Education: Mississippi State University

Morris King Thompson (born 1955 in Cleveland, Mississippi) was the eleventh bishop of the Episcopal Diocese of Louisiana.

== Education ==
Thompson grew up as a Presbyterian. After high school he enlisted for two years in the United States Marine Corps after which he graduated from Mississippi State University. Morris attended seminary at the Southern Baptist Theological Seminary in Louisville, Kentucky, where he graduated with a Master in Divinity degree with an emphasis on pastoral care and counseling. Later he attended the University of Mississippi Medical Center where he did a year residency of clinical pastoral education.

== Ministry ==
Thompson was ordained as a Southern Baptist minister in 1981. After his conversion to the Episcopal Church he was ordained deacon in December 1990 and a priest in June 1991. He served as associate rector of St James's Church in Jackson, Mississippi. In 1997 he was appointed Dean of Christ Church Cathedral in Lexington, Kentucky.

== Episcopacy ==
Thompson was elected bishop of Louisiana on December 5, 2009. He was consecrated bishop on May 8, 2010, with Presiding Bishop Katharine Jefferts Schori as chief consecrator in Christ Church Cathedral, New Orleans. He was seated as bishop on May 13.

In March 2021, Thompson announced his retirement, indicating his intention to step down as the bishop of the Episcopal Diocese of Louisiana. He specified that his resignation would take effect in November 2022.

== See also ==
- List of Episcopal bishops of the United States
- Historical list of the Episcopal bishops of the United States
