= Davis Sessums =

American bishop

The Right Reverend Davis Sessums D.D.
- Bishop of Louisiana
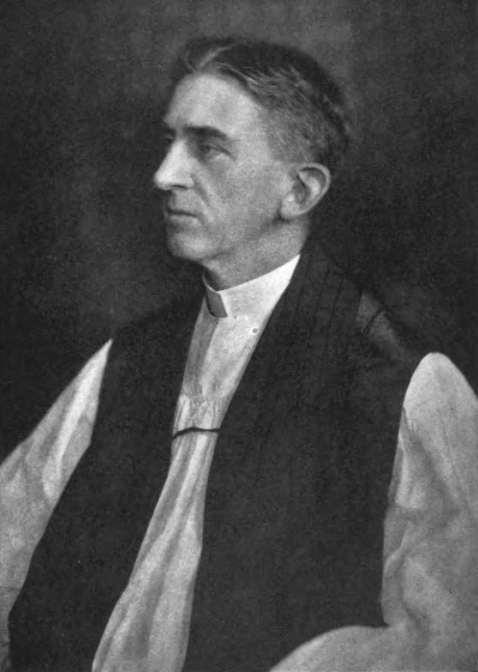
- Church: Episcopal Church
- Diocese: Louisiana
- Elected: April 10, 1891
- In office: 1891–1929
- Predecessor: John Nicholas Galleher
- Successor: James Craik Morris
- Previous post: Coadjutor Bishop of Louisiana (1891)

Orders
- Ordination: August 13, 1882 by Alexander Gregg
- Consecration: June 24, 1891 by Charles Todd Quintard

Personal details
- Born: July 7, 1858 Houston, Texas, United States
- Died: December 24, 1929 (aged 71) New Orleans, Louisiana, United States
- Buried: Metairie Cemetery
- Denomination: Anglican
- Parents: Alexander Sessums & Mary Runnels
- Spouse: Alice Castleman Galleher
- Children: 2

Davis Sessums (July 7, 1858 - December 24, 1929) was a bishop of Louisiana in The Episcopal Church.

== Biography ==
Sessums was born on July 7, 1858, in Houston, Texas, the son of Alexander Sessums and Mary Runnels. He was educated at Sewanee: The University of the South and graduated with first honors in 1878. He studied law at the University of Virginia.

He was ordained deacon on February 5, 1882, and priest on August 13 of the same year by Alexander Gregg, Bishop of Texas. He served as rector of Grace Church in Galveston, Texas and later in 1883 he became rector of Calvary Church in Memphis, Tennessee. In 1883 he transferred to New Orleans and became rector of Christ Church, the present day cathedral. He remained in this post until 1891, when on April 10, he was unanimously elected Coadjutor Bishop of Louisiana. He was consecrated on June 24. That same year he was elected and succeeded as diocesan bishop after the death Bishop Galleher on December 7. During his episcopacy he was instrumental in establishing New Orleans oldest parish church into the Cathedral church of Louisiana, it being the church he served as rector between 1883 and 1891. In 1892, he conducted services at the General Convention in Baltimore.
