= James Brown (bishop of Louisiana) =

American prelate of the Episcopal Church

The Right Reverend James Barrow Brown D.D.
- Bishop of Louisiana
- Church: Episcopal Church
- Diocese: Louisiana
- In office: 1976–1998
- Predecessor: Iveson B. Noland
- Successor: Charles Jenkins

Orders
- Ordination: 1965 by Girault M. Jones
- Consecration: April 24, 1976 by John Allin

Personal details
- Born: September 26, 1932 (age 94) El Dorado, Arkansas, United States
- Denomination: Anglican (prev. Presbyterian)
- Parents: John Alexander Brown & Ella May Langham
- Spouse: Mary Joanna Strausser
- Children: 2
- Education: Louisiana State University

James Barrow Brown (born September 26, 1932) is an American prelate of the Episcopal Church. He served as the ninth Bishop of the Episcopal Diocese of Louisiana from 1976 to 1998.

== Early life and education ==
Brown was born on September 26, 1932, in El Dorado, Arkansas, the son of Presbyterians John Alexander Brown and Ella May Langham. He graduated from Louisiana State University in 1954 with a Bachelor of Science. He graduated with a Bachelor of Divinity from Austin Presbyterian Theological Seminary in 1957. In 1976, he earned his Doctor of Divinity from Sewanee: The University of the South.

== Priesthood ==
In 1957, Brown was ordained as a Presbyterian minister and served as a US Army chaplain between 1957 and 1959. A few years later he joined the Episcopal Church. He was ordained an Episcopal deacon on June 22, 1965, and priest later that year. He served as curate of St George's Church in Bossier City, Louisiana. He was later appointed as rector of Grace Church in Monroe, Louisiana and then of St Andrew's Church in New Orleans. In 1971 Brown was appointed as Archdeacon of Louisiana.

== Bishop ==
Brown was elected Bishop of Louisiana in 1976 and was consecrated on April 24, 1976, by Presiding Bishop John Allin. Around 3000 people attended his consecration which took place in the Assembly Center of Louisiana State University. The drafted Book of Common Prayer was used for the consecration, which book was officially published in 1979. Brown is renowned for his efforts to form a new diocese in western Louisiana, as area which was not being served properly due to the increasing number of members. Hence in 1979 the General Convention of the Episcopal Church approved the division of the Diocese of Louisiana and established the Episcopal Diocese of Western Louisiana.

Episcopal Church (USA) titles
Preceded by Iveson B. Noland	Bishop of Louisiana; 1976–1998	Succeeded by Charles Jenkins
