= Joseph Pere Bell Wilmer =

American bishop

The Right Reverend Joseph Pere Bell Wilmer D.D., LL.D.
- Bishop of Louisiana
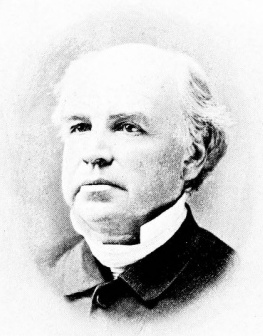
- Church: Episcopal Church
- Diocese: Louisiana
- Elected: May 18, 1866
- In office: 1866–1878
- Predecessor: Leonidas Polk
- Successor: John Nicholas Galleher

Orders
- Ordination: May 1834 by Richard Channing Moore
- Consecration: November 7, 1866 by John Henry Hopkins

Personal details
- Born: February 11, 1812 Swedesboro, New Jersey, United States
- Died: December 2, 1878 (aged 66) New Orleans, Louisiana, United States
- Buried: Green Mount Cemetery
- Denomination: Anglican
- Parents: Simon Wilmer & Rebecca Frisby
- Spouse: Helen Skipwith
- Children: 6

Joseph Pere Bell Wilmer (February 11, 1812 – December 2, 1878) was the second Episcopal bishop of Louisiana.

== Early life ==
Joseph Wilmer was born in Swedesboro, New Jersey, United States, in 1812, the son of the Rev. Simon (himself son of the Rev. Simon and uncle of Bishop Richard Hooker Wilmer) and Rebecca (Frisby) Wilmer. He attended the University of Virginia, where he graduated in 1831; Kenyon College, where he graduated in 1833; and Virginia Theological Seminary, where he graduated in 1834. In 1857, he received the degree of D.D. from Union College in Schenectady, New York. Wilmer was ordained a deacon in the Episcopal Church on July 10, 1834, in St. Paul's Episcopal Church in Alexandria, Virginia, by Bishop Richard Channing Moore of Virginia. He was ordained a priest by the same bishop at St. Paul's Episcopal Church in Petersburg, Virginia, in May 1838. He married Helen Skipwith, the daughter of Humburston and Sarah (Nevison) Skipwith, with whom he had six children.

== Ordained ministry ==
Wilmer began his ordained ministry by serving at St. Anne's Parish in Albemarle, Virginia, from 1834 to 1838. The following year he served as the chaplain at his alma mater, the University of Virginia. In 1839, he was appointed chaplain in the United States Army. He resigned from the army in 1843 to take charge of Hungars Parish in Northampton County, Virginia. After that he served as rector of St. Paul's Episcopal Church in Goochland County, Virginia, until 1848, when he became rector of St. Mark's Episcopal Church in Philadelphia, Pennsylvania. He served there until the breakout of the Civil War in 1861, when he retired to his estate in Virginia.

== Episcopate ==
His cousin Richard Hooker Wilmer was elected Bishop of Alabama by the Protestant Episcopal Church in the Confederate States of America during the American Civil War, and, although Richard Wilmer was unable to attend the first General Convention after the war, his consecration was ratified by the reunited church.

In May 1866, Joseph Wilmer was elected as the second bishop of the Diocese of Louisiana, succeeding Bishop (and General) Leonidas Polk, who had died during the siege of Atlanta in 1864. He was consecrated as bishop in Christ Church, New Orleans, on November 7, 1866, by Presiding Bishop John Henry Hopkins, as well as Bishops William Mercer Green, Richard Hooker Wilmer (his cousin), and Charles Todd Quintard. During his episcopate, Bishop Wilmer grew the diocese, despite financial, flooding, and political troubles. During his first eight years, the number of congregations, church buildings, and communicants in the diocese more than doubled. Wilmer died suddenly of apoplexy in New Orleans on December 2, 1878. He was buried at Green Mount Cemetery in Baltimore, Maryland.
