= Charles Jenkins (bishop) =

Bishop of Louisiana (1951–2021)

The Right Reverend Charles Edward Jenkins
- Bishop of Louisiana
- Church: Episcopal Church
- Diocese: Louisiana
- Elected: September 13, 1997
- In office: 1998–2009
- Predecessor: James Brown
- Successor: Morris King Thompson
- Previous post: Coadjutor Bishop of Louisiana (1998)

Orders
- Ordination: 1977 by James Brown
- Consecration: January 31, 1998 by Frank Griswold

Personal details
- Born: July 27, 1951 Shreveport, Louisiana, United States
- Died: April 9, 2021 (aged 69) St. Francisville, Louisiana, United States
- Denomination: Anglican
- Spouse: Louise Hazel Jenkins
- Children: 2
- Education: Louisiana State University

Charles Edward Jenkins III (July 27, 1951 – April 9, 2021) was the 10th bishop of the Episcopal Diocese of Louisiana.

== Career ==
Jenkins was born July 27, 1951, in Shreveport, Louisiana. He graduated from Louisiana Tech University in 1973 and was ordained by James B. Brown, whom he would succeed, in 1977 having gone to seminary at Nashotah House. After serving briefly as an assistant chaplain at Louisiana State University he served in parishes in Louisiana and Texas. He was rector of St. Luke's, Baton Rouge when he was elected bishop coadjutor in 1997, and consecrated in 1998, assuming the diocesan bishopric on March 28, 1998, upon Brown's retirement.

Jenkins's term as bishop was marked most prominently by the devastation of Hurricane Katrina, and eventually he was diagnosed with post-traumatic stress disorder, leading to his early retirement at the end of 2009. His own new house, which he had slept in only four times, was destroyed by the flooding. He testified before the House Committee on Transportation and Infrastructure in 2009 on the impact of ending the Disaster Housing Assistance Program for those displaced by the storm. Together with Episcopal Relief and Development he formed the diocesan Office of Disaster Response in order to coordinate the church's charitable response to the disaster as well as working with interfaith agencies.

In the Episcopal Church's struggles over homosexuality Jenkins has been generally seen as a conservative voice; he withheld consent for the consecration of Gene Robinson as bishop of New Hampshire, voted against liturgies for blessings of same sex relationships at the 2000 General Convention, and voted for a resolution to "Endorse Certain Historic Anglican Doctrines and Policies" that was proposed by Bishop Ackerman. On the other hand, he was seen as opposing division of the church at the 2007 meeting of the House of Bishops at Camp Allen in Texas and was reported to be involved in the initial stages of formulating the bishops' statement from that meeting.

Jenkins was a nominee for presiding bishop in 2006, losing out to Katharine Jefferts Schori. He served on Frank Griswold's Council of Advice beginning in 2003 and was part of the special delegation to the Anglican Consultative Council in 2005 which discussed same-sex issues. He sat on the Nashotah House Board of Trustees from 1981 to 1991.

Jenkins retired on December 31, 2009, and was succeeded by Morris King Thompson, who was consecrated on May 8, 2010. He died on April 9, 2021, in St. Francisville, Louisiana from pancreatic cancer.

Episcopal Church (USA) titles
Preceded by James B. Brown	Bishop of the Episcopal Diocese of Louisiana; 1998–2009	Succeeded by Morris King Thompson
