= James Craik Morris =

American bishop

The Right Reverend James Craik Morris D.D.
- Bishop of Louisiana
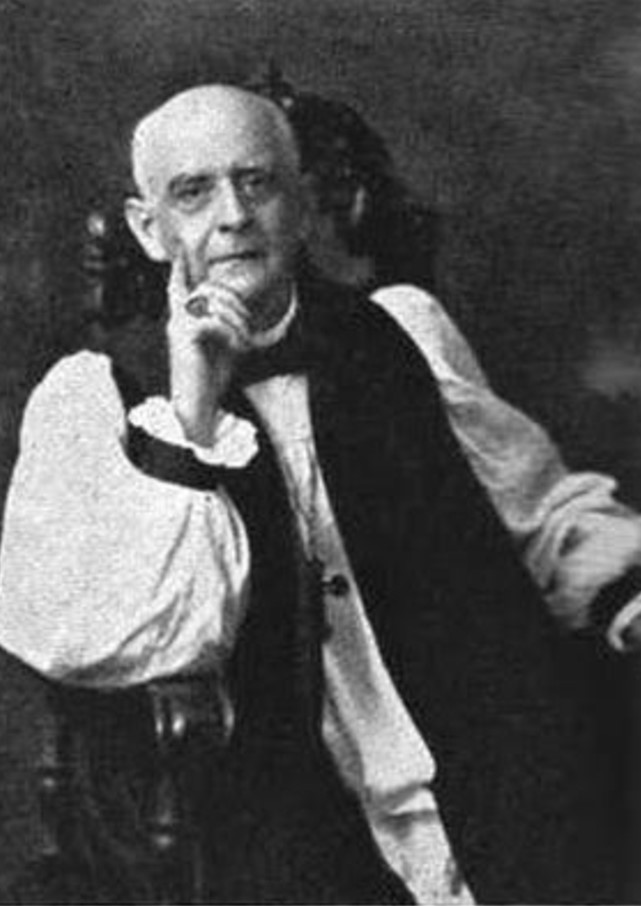
- Church: Episcopal Church
- Diocese: Louisiana
- Elected: May 14, 1930
- In office: 1930–1939
- Predecessor: Davis Sessums
- Successor: John Long Jackson
- Previous post: Bishop of Panama (1920-1930)

Orders
- Ordination: July 5, 1896 by Alexander Charles Garrett
- Consecration: February 5, 1920 by Daniel S. Tuttle

Personal details
- Born: June 18, 1870 Louisville, Kentucky, United States
- Died: March 5, 1944 (aged 73) Sewanee, Tennessee, United States
- Buried: University of the South Cemetery, Sewanee, Tennessee
- Denomination: Anglican
- Parents: John Hite Morton Morris & Fanny Craik
- Spouse: Edith Garland Tucker
- Children: 3

James Craik Morris (June 18, 1870 - March 5, 1944) was bishop of what is now the Anglican Diocese of Panama, and of the Episcopal Diocese of Louisiana from 1930 to 1939.

== Education ==
Morris was born on June 18, 1870, in Louisville, Kentucky, the son of John Hite Morton Morris (1832-1910) and Fanny Craik Morris (1839-1917). He was educated at the Old Grammar House in Sewanee, Tennessee and later graduated with a Bachelor of Letters from Sewanee: The University of the South in 1890 and his Masters a year later. In 1892 he graduated with a Bachelor of Laws from University of Louisville School of Law. In 1893 he entered the General Theological Seminary where he studied Theology and trained for the ordained ministry and graduated in 1896. He received an honorary Doctorate of Divinity in 1915 from Sewanee.

== Priest ==
Morris was made deacon on January 26, 1896, by Bishop Thomas Underwood Dudley of Kentucky and ordained priest on July 5, 1896, by Bishop Alexander Charles Garrett of Dallas. His first post was as assistant in St Matthew's Cathedral in Dallas, Texas. In 1898 he was appointed curate of St James' Church in Brooklyn, New York City and later became Dean of St Mary's Cathedral in Memphis, Tennessee in 1901. He served as rector of Grace Church in Madison, Wisconsin between 1916 till 1920.

== Bishop of Panama ==
In 1919 the General Convention elected Morris as Missionary Bishop of Panama. He was consecrated in Grace Church in Memphis by Presiding Bishop Daniel S. Tuttle on February 5, 1920. He spent 10 years in the Panama Canal Zone and parts of Columbia. He also subsequently spent some time as responsible Bishop of Haiti.

== Bishop of Louisiana ==
On May 14, 1930, during the special diocesan council meeting, Morris was elected to be the 5th Bishop of Louisiana. He was installed bishop in New Orleans on September 24, 1930. Morris was instrumental in the revision of the Hymnal by the national commission, of which he was a member. He was a great musician and was involved in choir conducting and playing the organ, even during services in which he presided. During his time in Louisiana, he revived the diocese and eliminated debts. He retired on March 1, 1939, due to ill health. Morris died on March 5, 1944.

== Personal life ==
Morris married Edith Garland Tucker of Dallas in 1900 and together they had three children.
