= Shannon Rogers Duckworth =

American bishop

Shannon Rogers Duckworth is an American bishop in the Episcopal Church, currently serving as the 12th Bishop of Louisiana.

== Family and education ==
Born in Mississippi, Duckworth received a Bachelor's degree in English and history from Millsaps College and a Master of Divinity degree in 2001 from General Theological Seminary.

She has two sons from a previous marriage, and is currently married to James Duckworth.

== Career ==
Duckworth was ordained as a priest in 2001. She was curate of Saint John's Episcopal Church in Ocean Springs, Mississippi, from 2001 to 2002 and vicar of St. Mary’s Episcopal Church in Lexington, Mississippi, from 2002 to 2005 before serving as chaplain at St. Andrew's Episcopal School in Jackson, Mississippi, from 2005 to 2007 and associate rector of St. James’ Episcopal Church in Jackson from 2007 to 2013. In 2013 she became canon to the ordinary in the Episcopal Diocese of Louisiana.

On May 14, 2022, Duckworth was elected to serve as the 12th Bishop of Louisiana. On November 19, 2022, she was consecrated by the Presiding Bishop of the Episcopal Church, Michael Curry, at a service held at Christ Church Cathedral in New Orleans.
