= John Breckinridge Castleman =

Confederate Army officer (1841–1918)

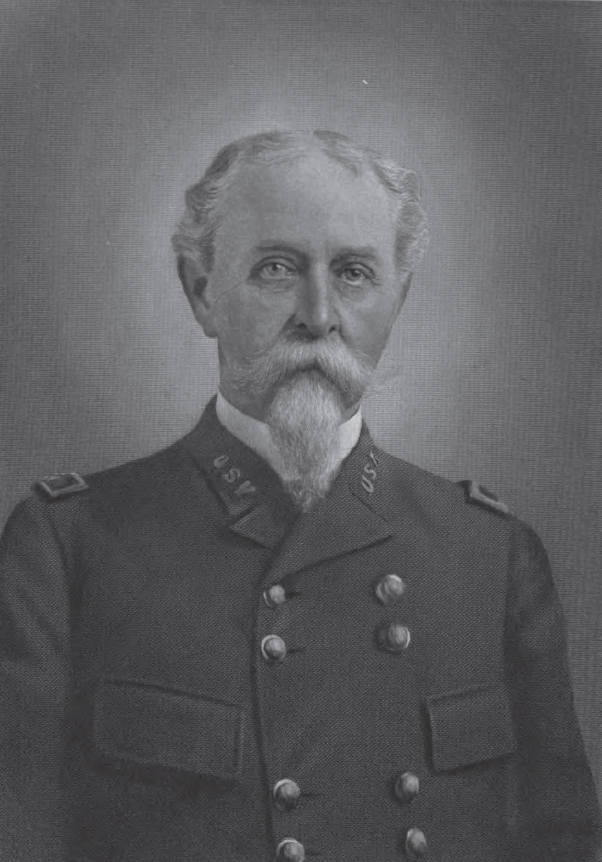
- Born: June 30, 1841; Castleton Farm, Lexington, Kentucky, U.S.
- Died: May 23, 1918 (aged 76); Louisville, Kentucky, U.S.
- Resting place: Cave Hill Cemetery; Louisville, Kentucky, U.S.
- Political party: Democratic Party
- Spouse: Alice Barbee Castleman (m. 1868)
- Children: 2
- Military career
- Spouse: Alice Barbee Castleman
- Children: 2
- Allegiance: Confederate States of America (1860–65); United States of America (1878–19??)
- Branch: Confederate States Army; U.S. Army
- Rank: Major (CS Army); Brigadier general (US Army)
- Units: 2nd (Duke's) Cavalry Regiment; Louisville Legion
- Conflicts: American Civil War; Spanish–American War; Puerto Rico Campaign

Signature
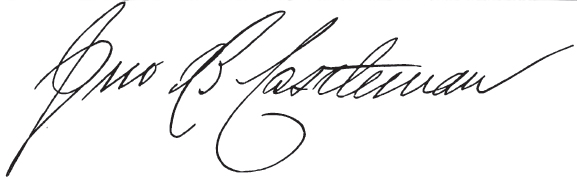

John Breckinridge Castleman (June 30, 1841 – May 23, 1918) was a Confederate officer and later a United States Army brigadier general as well as a prominent landowner and businessman in Louisville, Kentucky.

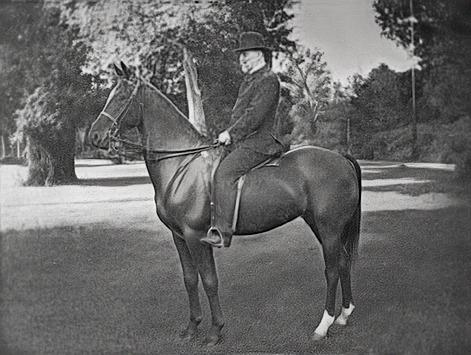
John B. Castleman on his black Saddlebred mare, Carolina (b. 1899). Castleman served as a horse cavalry officer in the Confederate Army (CSA).

== Early life ==
John B. Castleman was the 7th of 11 surviving children born to David B. Castleman (1786–1852) and Virginia Harrison (1806–1895) who were married in Kentucky in 1824. By birth, he was closely related to a future 14th U.S. vice president, John Cabell Breckinridge; their respective maternal grandmothers were sisters. He studied law at Transylvania University before the Civil War.

== Military career ==
At the age of 19, Castleman entered into Confederate service. An obituary reports that he later repented of his support of slavery.

During the Civil War, Castleman recruited 41 men in his hometown of Lexington, Kentucky, who went to Knoxville, Tennessee, to form the Second Kentucky Cavalry company under John Hunt Morgan and Basil W. Duke.

Castleman was promoted to major in 1864. He led guerrillas in the attempted burning of supply boats in St. Louis, Missouri and was arrested in October 1864 at Sullivan, Indiana. He was convicted of spying and conspiring to destroy government property in violation of the laws of war, and sentenced to death, but his death sentence was suspended by Abraham Lincoln. Following the war, Castleman was exiled from the United States, and studied medicine in France. He was pardoned by president Andrew Johnson and returned to Kentucky in 1866.

He revived the Louisville Legion, a militia unit, in 1878 and was appointed adjutant general of Kentucky by Governor J. Procter Knott in 1883. The unit became the 1st Kentucky Volunteers in the Spanish–American War, and Castleman was commissioned a colonel in the U.S. Army. His unit participated in the invasion of Puerto Rico, and after the war he was promoted to brigadier general and served as military governor of the island.

Castleman was also notably responsible for helping to keep the Commonwealth of Kentucky together serving as Adjutant General during the infamous Taylor-Goebel troubles, when Kentucky almost devolved into civil war following the assassination of Kentucky Governor William Goebel.

== Social issues ==
When a dispute over whether African-American soldiers serving in the US Army arose among some Southerners during the First World War, General Castleman said, "I unhesitatingly say that I will at any time salute an officer, superior or inferior, who salutes me, without regard to the color of his skin. The regulations and laws, and the fundamentals of courtesy and discipline, upon which these regulations and laws are based, prescribe this. It is no time to stand against them. I want to urge every soldier to be a soldier in the full sense of the term. We are at war, and soldiers are under the rules of the American army. We are all one under the flag. We salute the rank, not the individual."

According to a newspaper eulogy published following his death, John B Castleman could also be described as an early advocate for social justice in the city of Louisville. A May 26, 1918, tribute to him published in the Courier Journal entitled "A Negro's tribute to General Castleman", written by African American educator and community member J. Raymond Harris, heralded Castleman for his commitment and kindness to the African American community of Louisville. Harris starts his eulogy with "Will you give me space in which to speak of the great sorrow that has come to the colored people in General Castleman's Death"

Harris makes sure to note Castleman's Civil War service alongside the Confederacy, but speaks of his road to redemption saying "yet no hero on the other side ever held so high a niche in the hearts and minds of colored Kentuckians."

Elsewhere in the eulogy, Harris speaks truth to the selfless nature of Castleman by saying "His Kindness to us, his willingness to help with counsel and advice, were unstudied and uncalculated the result of neither the politician's bid of popularity nor of the selfish man's desire to advance his own self interests."

Harris also wrote kindly of the general “Whenever . . . injustice or proscription raised its hand against African Americans, Gen. Castleman's voice was heard pleading for toleration and amicable adjustment.”

Another example of Castleman's standing up for racial justice in his time can be found in a 1924 Courier Journal article written by 19 African American faith leaders published six years after his death. In the letter outlining outrage at the recent segregation of the park system, the leaders specifically mention Castleman not only as the father of the park system, but point out that it was Castleman who had prevented the segregation of the parks while alive. The leaders said "General Castleman, the Father of our Park System, refused to allow any kind of racial segregation in the parks of the city, and this policy has been followed until the present board issued it's segregation orders a few days ago. This has been true in theory and in fact.

Castleman and his wife were also early supporters of the suffragette movement. His wife Alice Barbee Castleman was the first vice president of the Kentucky Equal Rights Association in 1910, and 1911. Castleman supported his wife both financially and emotionally in her battle to secure voting rights for all women at a time when it was unpopular, even dangerous, to do so. According to National American Woman Suffrage Association records, Alice Barbee Castleman was a delegate for the Kentucky Equal Rights Association when they were lobbying for the passage of what became known as the "Susan B. Anthony Amendment" during the 65th and 66th sessions of Congress.

== Business career ==
He graduated from the University of Louisville School of Law in 1868, married, and founded an insurance company, Barbee and Castleman, with his father-in-law. The company represented Royal Insurance Company of Liverpool in the Southern United States.

In 1870, Castleman bought a 60-acre (240,000 m^{2}) tract of land called Schwartz's Wood in what was then the outskirts of Louisville. He intended to build a country estate there, but as Louisville expanded around it quickly, the land became much more valuable as a subdivision. It became the western half of Louisville's Tyler Park neighborhood.

== Political career ==
Castleman never ran for office, but his military and business reputation gave him considerable influence. As a Delegate to the 1892 Democratic National Convention, he successfully lobbied for the nomination of Grover Cleveland. After Governor William Goebel was shot in 1900, Castleman was again appointed adjutant general of Kentucky and was instrumental in averting civil war in Kentucky in the fallout of the assassination.

In Louisville, he had great influence as Commissioner of the Board of Parks for over 25 years, during which time he helped establish Louisville's Olmsted Park system, which spurred development in various parts of Louisville and became one of the city's prized possessions over the next century.

Castleman, while Commissioner of the Board of Parks, fought hard to keep the parks integrated as is evidenced by a 1924 letter signed by 19 prominent African American faith leaders published six years after his death. They wrote in response to the 1924 segregation orders ". . . Gen. Castleman . . .steadfastly refused to allow any kind of racial segregation in the parks of the city . . . African Americans have used all parks of the city . . . without . . hindrance through all these years and with little or no trouble of any kind."

However, the extent of Castleman's contribution to the establishment of Louisville's Olmsted Park system has been called into question, and it is claimed that Castleman took credit due to (the Northerner, "carpetbagger") Andrew Cowan. Cowan had originally proposed the park system in a 1887 newspaper essay. An Op-ed in the Courier-Journal claimed that "It was Cowan who successfully lobbied for the state legislation to create a Louisville Park Commission. It was Cowan who first invited Olmsted, the renowned landscape architect, to Louisville and who secretly coached the firm on how to price their work in order to win the bid.... If Castleman had his way, Olmsted never would have been hired."

In 1905, he was a key figure supporting Louisville's Fusionist Party, an anti-corruption party. Although the Fusionists never won many elections, they eventually caused reform in Louisville's election system to come about.

== Death and legacy ==
His autobiography Active Service was published by Courier-Journal Job Printing Co. in 1917.

Castleman died May 23, 1918, He and his wife, Alice Barbee Castleman, had two daughters, Alice and Elsie. He was buried in Cave Hill Cemetery.

=== Monument statue ===
His statue at a traffic circle in the Cherokee Triangle neighborhood, the John B. Castleman Monument, became a well-known local landmark. It depicted Castleman in civilian clothes riding his beloved mare, Carolina. The statue attracted controversy due to Castleman's service with the Confederate Army, notwithstanding his later service with the U.S. Army and his enlightened racial attitudes in later life. The statue was removed by the city on June 8, 2020, after initial plans to remove it in 2018 were stalled due to a court appeal by area residents that, on June 5, 2020, was decided in favor of Louisville Metro's right to remove it. The decision was overruled in April 2023 by the Kentucky Supreme Court due to a conflict of interest.

The statue is to be moved to Castleman's burial site following cleaning at a storage facility, although this has not been done as of May 2025.

== Sources ==
- Johnston, J. Stoddard, ed. (1896). Memorial History of Louisville.
- Johnson, E. Polk (1912). A History of Kentucky and Kentuckians: The Leaders and Representative Men in Commerce, Industry and Modern Activities. Lewis Publishing Company. pp. 945–950.
