= Andrew Cowan (soldier) =

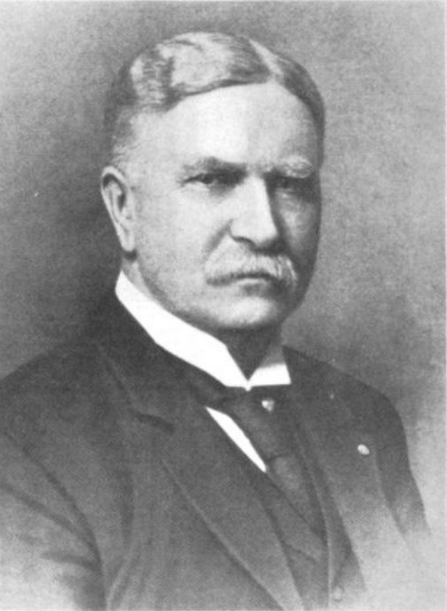
- Born: September 29, 1841; Ayrshire, Scotland
- Died: August 23, 1919 (aged 77); Louisville, Kentucky
- Resting place: Cave Hill Cemetery
- Occupations: Soldier, businessman
- Spouses: Mary Asdit (m. 1864; died 1867) Anna L. Gilbert (m. 1876)

Andrew Cowan (September 29, 1841 – August 23, 1919) served as a Union artillerist in the American Civil War. He distinguished himself at the Battle of Gettysburg and the Battle of Sayler's Creek. Subsequently, he "amassed a fortune in the leather industry and used that wealth in a variety of philanthropic activities. In addition, he was a prominent force in healing the wounds between the North and South and bringing peace to a fractured nation."

== Pre-War ==
Andrew Cowan was born in Ayrshire, Scotland on September 29, 1841, and he migrated to the United States as a boy. He married his first wife, Mary Asdit, in upper New York State on February 23, 1864. She bore a son, Albert Andrew Cowan, in August 1867 but she died the following month, most likely from complications from childbirth.

== Civil War service ==
Andrew Cowan had seen service in Virginia before becoming an officer in an independent battery.

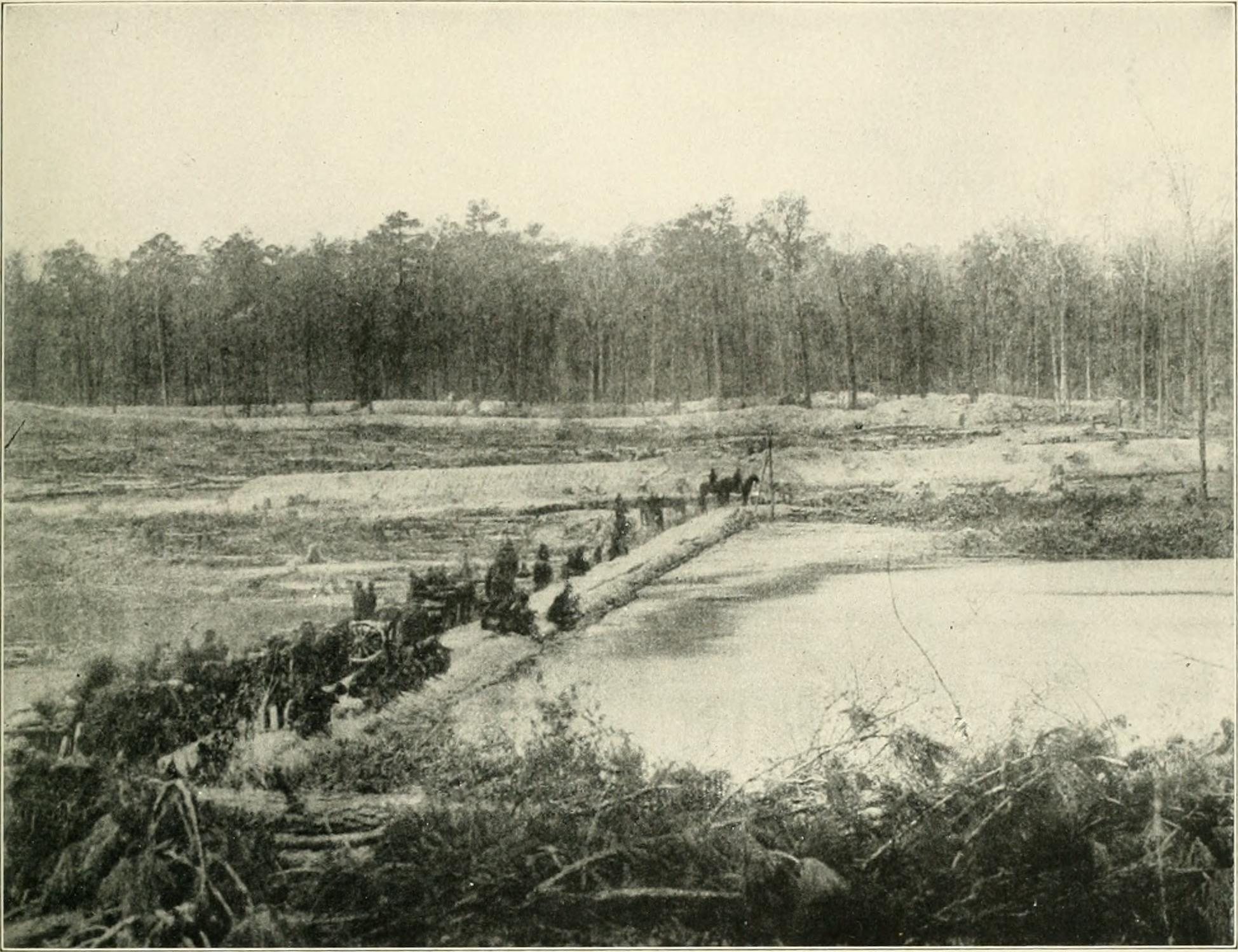
Lieutenant Andrew Cowan, commanding officer, and First-Lieutenant William F. Wright, sit their horses on the farther side of the Warwick River, awaiting the order to advance on Williamsburg, May 4, 1862.

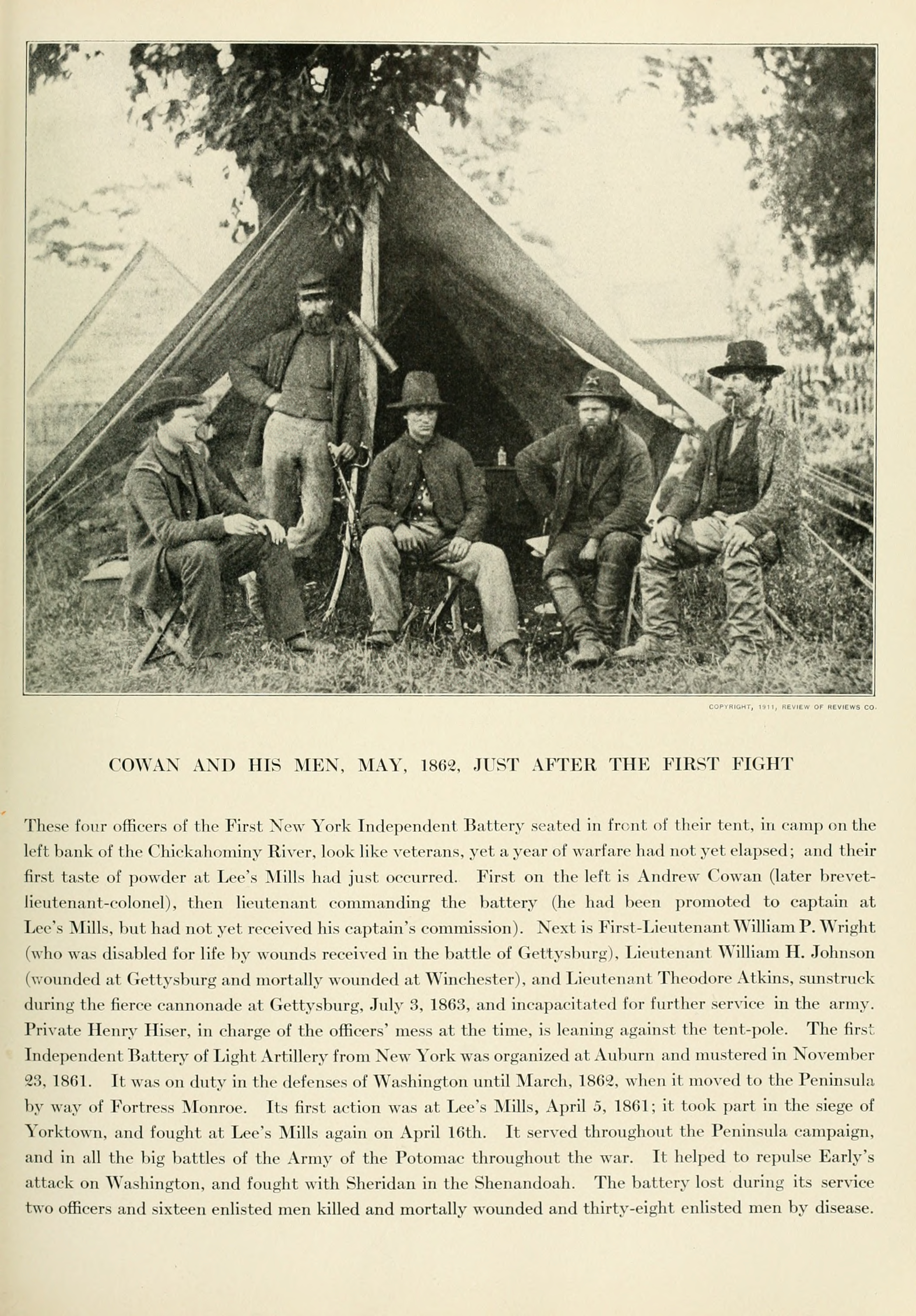
Left to right: Andrew Cowan; Pvt Henry Hiser; 1st Lt. William P. Wright (disabled for life of wounds at Gettysburg); Lt William H. Johnson (Wounded at Gettysburg and mortally wounded at Winchester Va); Lt Theodore Atkins (sunstruck) May 1862

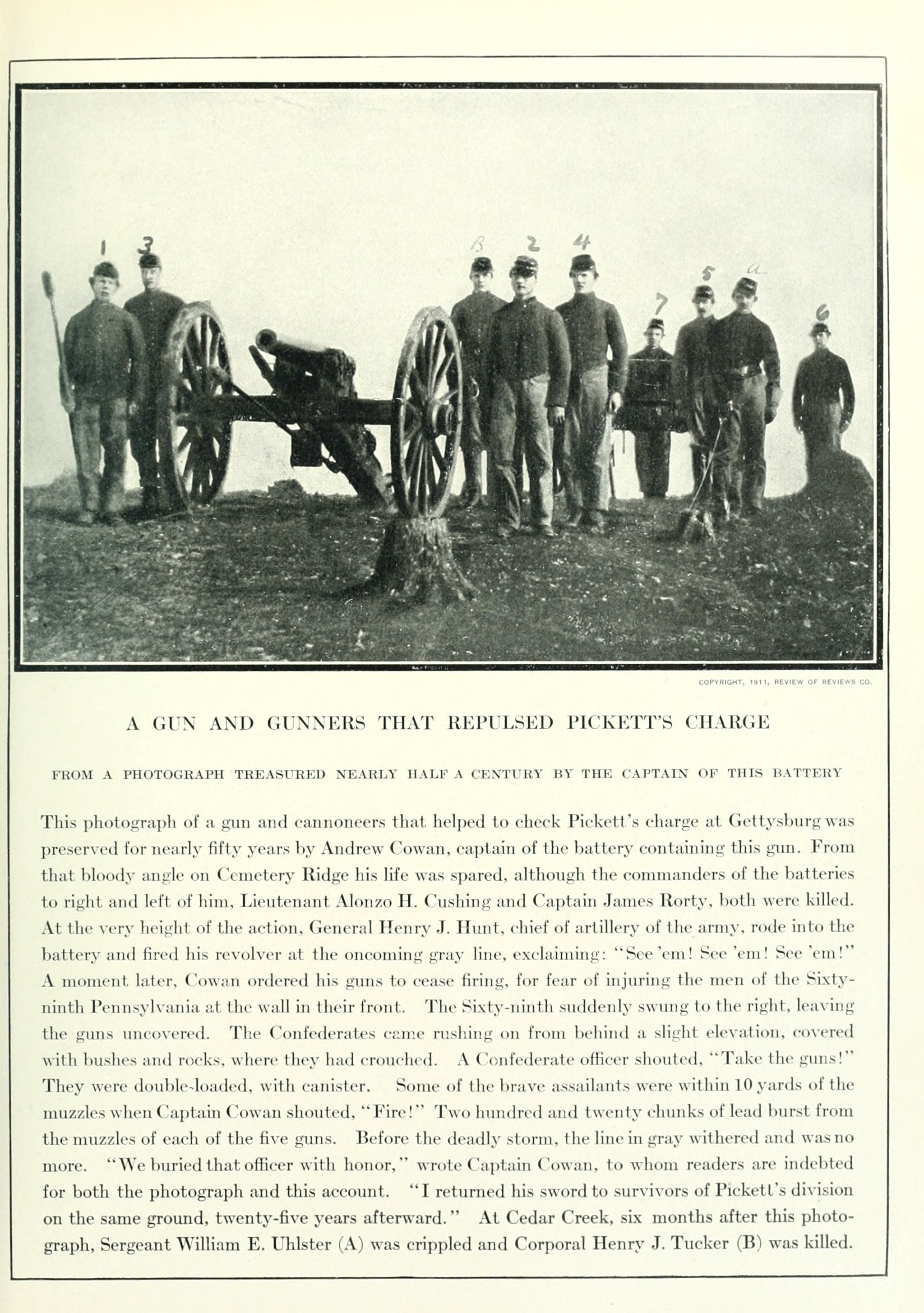
Cowan's Battery at Gettysburg;of the men in this picture Sgt William E. Uhlster [A] (Second from right) was crippled and Corp Henry J Tucker [B] (3rd from left) killed -at the Battle of Cedar Creek,

The 1st New York Battery was recruited by Capt Terance J. Kennedy, mostly in Cayuga County, beginning on October 18, 1861. The battery was organized at Auburn, New York. Andrew Cowan was commissioned as the unit's first lieutenant. The battery was mustered into the service as a volunteer unit for a term of three years on November 23. The battery arrived in Washington, D.C., on December 4. Officially designated the 1st New York Battery three days later, it was assigned to BG William F. Smith's division of the Army of the Potomac in January 1862. The division joined IV Corps in March 1862. The division joined VI Corps in May 1862, serving in the Peninsula campaign. By that time, Lt Cowan was in charge. He was promoted to the rank of captain during the Peninsula campaign.

The 1st New York Battery served at the Battle of Yorktown and the Battle of Williamsburg under the division's senior artillerist Capt Romeyn B. Ayres. It took part in the Seven Days Battles, the Battle of South Mountain at Crampton's Gap, the Battle of Antietam, and the Battle of Fredericksburg. In the Chancellorsville Campaign, the battery served in the Second Battle of Fredericksburg, covering the crossing of VI Corps into the town of Fredericksburg. It then supported the division of BG Albion Howe at the Battle of Salem Church.

The battery was assigned to the Artillery Brigade of VI Corps in May 1863. In that arrangement, it served in the Battle of Gettysburg. In reserve at first, on July 3, 1863, it was placed just south of the copse of trees on Cemetery Ridge, in time to resist Pickett's Charge. Cowan's guns filled a gap in the infantry line left when a regiment left the front. Cowan ordered his men to fire "double canister" on a group of Confederates trying to penetrate the federal line, and their fire broke up that threat. BG Henry J. Hunt, the army's chief of artillery, was present with them and had his horse shot out from under him. A newspaper account reported that Capt Cowan served in a gun crew at the height of the assault. A monument to the battery, executed by J. G. Hamilton, stands on the site of this action.

In the autumn of 1863, the battery served in the Bristoe campaign, especially the Second Battle of Rappahannock Station, and in the Mine Run campaign.

The battery served in the VI Corps Artillery Brigade in the Overland Campaign and in the earliest stage of the siege of Petersburg. Then it served with the Army of the Shenandoah of MG Philip Sheridan from October 1864. In Sheridan's portion of the Valley campaigns of 1864, Cowan was wounded at the Third Battle of Winchester. His battery saw particularly hard service at the Battle of Cedar Creek.

Cowan served briefly in XXII Corps from December 1864 until it rejoined the Army of the Potomac on January 25, 1865. Men at the expiration of their term of service were given the chance to be discharged, but most reenlisted, permitting the battery to continue in service.

In the Army of the Potomac, Capt. Cowan, who had received the brevet rank of major, took command of the Artillery Brigade when Col Charles Henry Tompkins was assigned to other duties. Cowan was in charge of the VI Corps guns during the Appomattox Campaign. At the Battle of Sailor's Creek on April 6, 1865, Cowan had gathered 20 guns near the Hillsman House. They opened fire at about 5:15 PM, experiencing no counter-battery fire from the Confederates, because their guns had not accompanied the infantry. Two divisions of VI Corps attacked the Confederate rear guard, under Ltg Richard S. Ewell, at about 6:00 PM. Ewell's men attacked the VI Corps divisions as they crossed the stream. The Federals were thrown back. However, Cowan's guns stopped the Southern advance, allowing the infantry to reform and counterattack. The Confederate line was hit in the front by VI Corps and in the flank by federal cavalry. It collapsed, and Ewell was among the southerners captured on the field.

After Robert E. Lee's surrender, at which he was present, the battery returned home. It was honorably discharged and mustered out June 23, 1865, at Syracuse, New York. The 1st New York Battery lost 1 officer and 12 enlisted men killed. 1 officer and 6 enlisted men died of wounds; another 38 enlisted men died of disease or other causes. Andrew Cowan left the volunteer services as a brevet lieutenant colonel, this promotion dated April 9, 1865.

== Post war ==
=== Life in Louisville ===
After the war, Andrew Cowan married his second wife, Anna Gilbert, in New York State in 1876. On October 24, 1876, she bore a son, Gilbert S. Cowan, in Louisville, Kentucky, where he had by then settled. He became a leather merchant and after a less than cordial welcome ("He was what you might call a carpetbagger.... In a postbellum Louisville dominated by ex-Confederates, Cowan was from the wrong place at the wrong time with the wrong political leanings.") he eventually became locally prominent. His company sold retail. He also served on company boards, headed a printing company for the blind and was a park commissioner. Cowan also served on the committee that raised funds for the erection of the Statue of Liberty as the city's representative. In 1900, he was a member of a Kentucky delegation that visited the White House to discuss problems in the state with President William McKinley.

=== Louisville's parks ===
Although John Breckinridge Castleman is usually credited with creating Louisville's park system, credit is more properly due to Cowan. He originally proposed the park system in a newspaper essay of 1887. "It was Cowan who successfully lobbied for the state legislation to create a Louisville Park Commission. It was Cowan who first invited Olmsted, the renowned landscape architect, to Louisville and who secretly coached the firm on how to price their work in order to win the bid.... If Castleman had his way, Olmsted never would have been hired."

=== Veteran's affairs ===
Cowan also was active in veterans' affairs. On July 3, 1887, Col. Cowan took a leading part in the dedication of the monument to his battery in Gettysburg. He also gave to veterans of MG George Pickett's division, the Pickett Division association, a sword that had fallen into his hands at the Battle of Gettysburg. On September 9, 1895, Cowan gave a banquet for delegates to a convention of the Grand Army of the Republic. Cowan was close with Confederate survivors in Kentucky, who named him an honorary member of their Orphan Brigade in 1912. Cowan is credited with helping create the Gettysburg Peace Memorial Association, but he did not live to see the Peace Light dedicated in 1938. In 1915, Cowan was the father of a proposal to hold a Confederate reunion in Washington. Later that year, he gave an address at the dedication of a statue of BG Alexander S. Webb, who had commanded the Philadelphia Brigade at Gettysburg, in the Gettysburg National Military Park. When the Confederate reunion was held in 1917, Col. Cowan and President Woodrow Wilson were among the participants. Cowan presented an American flag that was hung beside the Confederate banner. Col. Cowan also served a term as president of the Society of the Army of the Potomac.

Andrew Cowan died in Louisville on August 23, 1919, at the age of 78. He was buried in Cave Hill Cemetery.
