= All Saints' College (Vicksburg) =

Episcopal women's college in Vicksburg, Mississippi, US

All Saints' Episcopal College is a former Episcopal college & Boarding School inVicksburg, Mississippi Originally a school for women, it began accepting male boarding students as All Saints' Episcopal School in 1971. It was founded in 1908 and it ceased operating as a traditional school in 2006, which at that time it became an Americorps campus for the NCCC Southern Division. It was used by Americorps until 2025, when due to Government Budget cuts it was given back to the Episcopal Church, and is currently on sale.

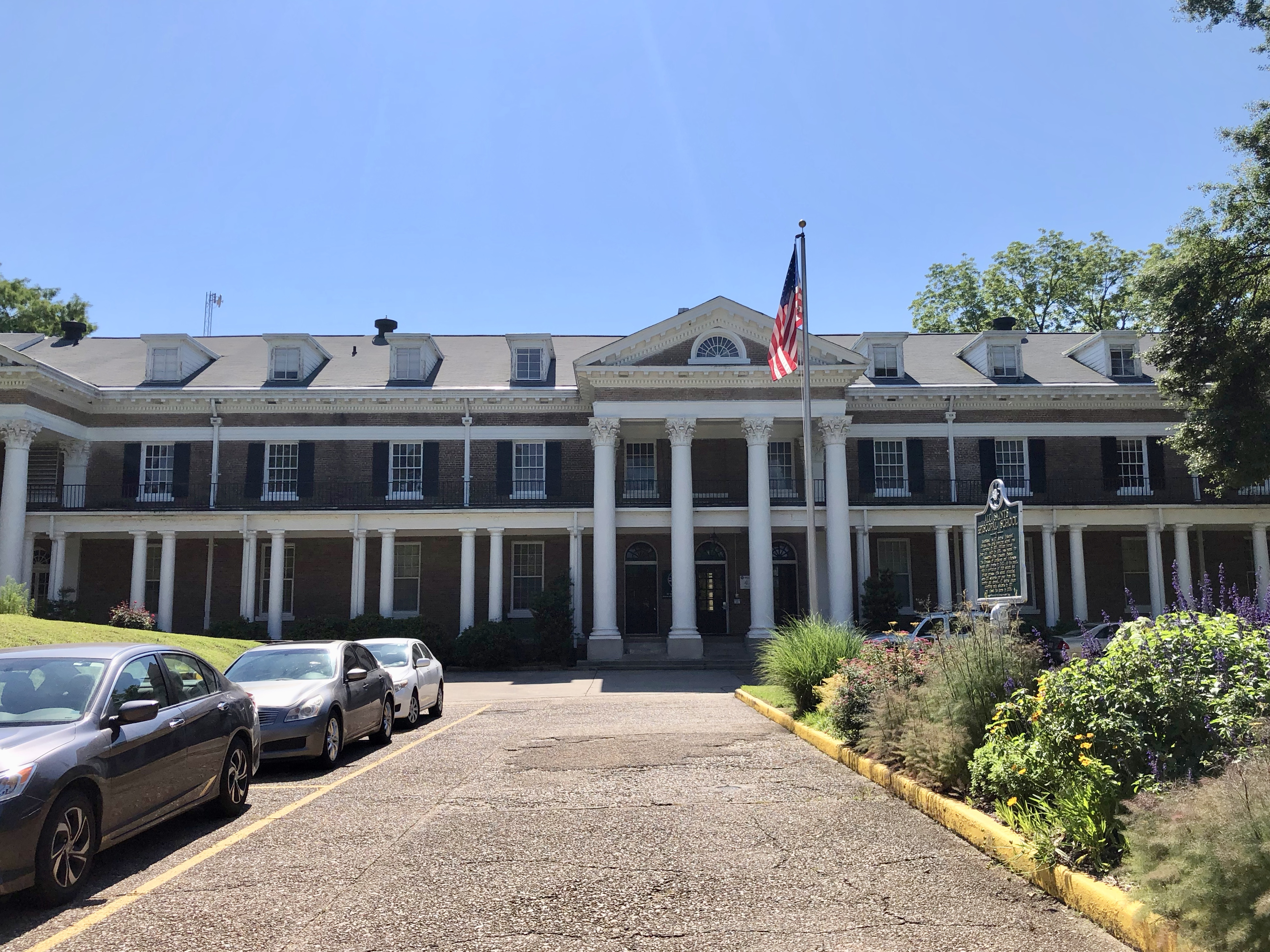
Former All Saints Episcopal School in Vicksburg

== Introduction ==
"All Saints' Episcopal College, established in 1908, was the outcome of years of planning. Its beginning is traced to the broad foundation of diocesan activities laid by the first Bishop of Mississippi, William Mercer Green, who was consecrated in 1850 and served as Bishop from 1850 to 1887."

The College of St. Andrew was the first of a series of diocesan schools established in Jackson in 1852. This was long before public schools. The Civil War disrupted plans for a diocesan school for girls, but other diocesan schools were established including: Wilson Hall at Early Grove in Marshall county; the Church School, Mississippi City; Okolona School for colored students in Okolona; and the Vicksburg Industrial School for colored boys and girls.

In 1903 Theodore DuBose Bratton, D.D., LL.D., a South Carolina native was elected Bishop of Mississippi. Bishop Bratton's idea of the establishment of All Saints' grew out of his own interest in Christian education for girls and women and his desire to finish the work begun by Bishop Green.

== History ==
=== The Name ===
The school was called the "Episcopal Diocese Girls College" in the records of the sale of the Vicksburg property, "All Saints' Episcopal College" in the Vicksburg Evening Post article on the opening and "All Saints' College for Girls" in the Times Picayune. The Diocese provided a loan of $50,000 to the new institution. The City of Vicksburg gave the school 25 acres and $32,500. The campus is highly significant, both for its pioneering role in the history of education of females in the South, and for its distinct and significant architectural presence on the city's bluffs. The entire campus is a recognized historical landmark.

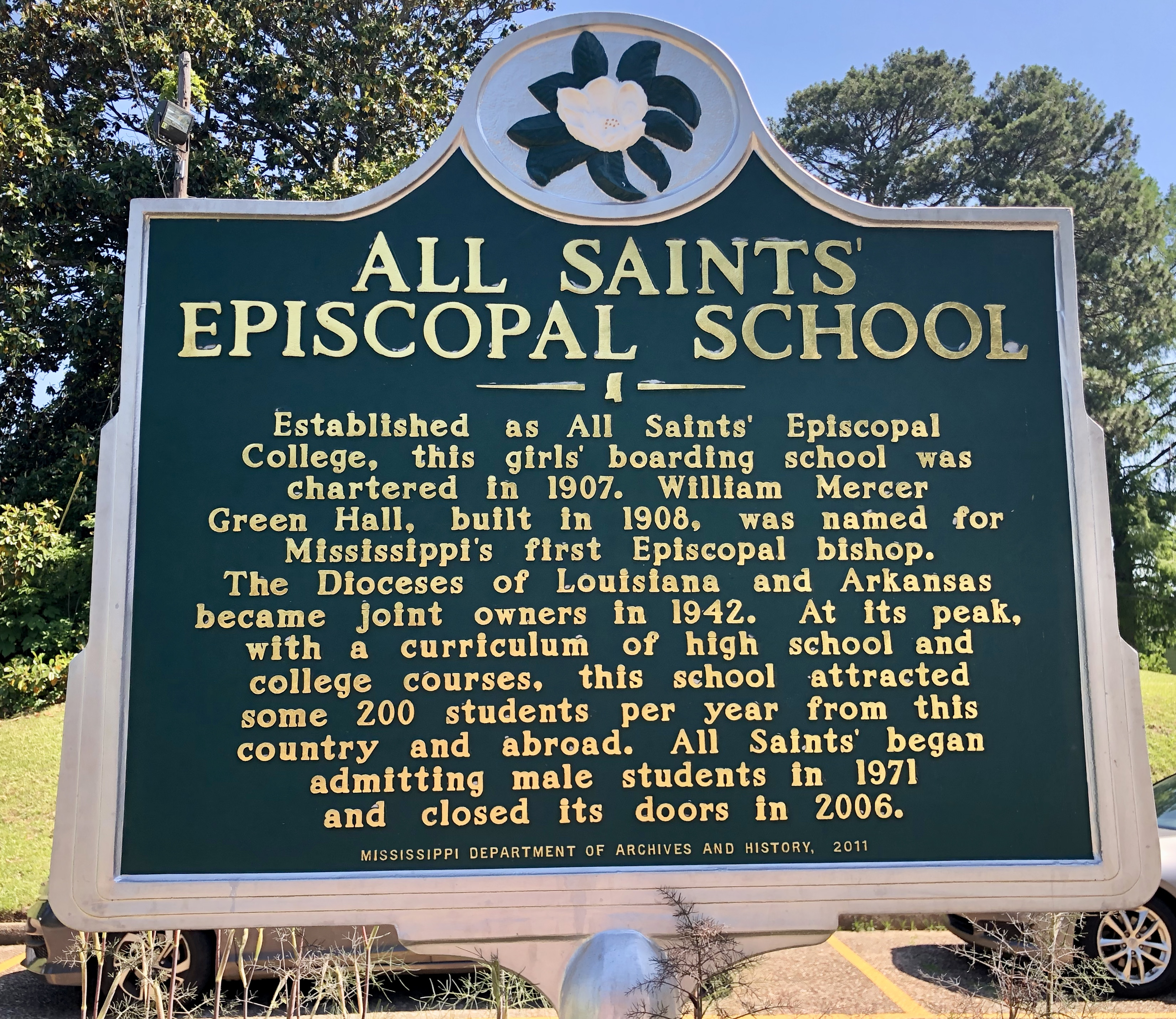
Historical Marker about the All Saints Episcopal School in Vicksburg.

=== William Mercer Green Hall ===
The original building of the school was named William Mercer Green Hall after Mississippi's first Episcopal bishop. The cornerstone was laid with Masonic honors on All Saints' day 1908. The historical building was designed by renowned DeBuys, Churchill and Labouisse architects of New Orleans and built by I. C. Garber of Jackson, Miss. who was awarded the contract for a bid of $62,175.

"The building was constructed on a steel frame of brick and concrete, 230 feet long and 40 feet wide, and the final cost was $80,000." The building included dormitory space for 50 students, a kitchen, dining room, administration offices, recital rooms, sound proofed practice rooms, a library and reading room, an infirmary, and art studios with prism glass skylights. The grounds included gardens for fresh vegetables and a small herd of Jersey cows for fresh milk.

=== Highlights ===
==== The First Academic Year 1909 - 1910 ====
The Rev William Mercer Green Jr., grandson of the first bishop of the diocese, was named the first Dean of the college. In the 1909 catalog we find the following statements:

The High School will conform to the standard set by the Southern Association of Colleges and Preparatory Schools. The Carnegie Unit System will be observed, and for graduation in the High School Course, 14 units will be required.

All Saints' will take the rank as a Junior College. It will confer no degrees, but its graduates will receive a Certificate of Graduation which will represent the completion of the first three years of a Standard College or University. The course will be equivalent to 48 points.

and a table of fees.

TERMS PER ANNUM
Tuition, board, fuel, light, laundry	$265–275.00
Medical fee, for boarders	10.00
Incidental fee	5.00
Day students, college	75.00
Day students, high school	60.00
Day students, preparatory	50.00

In addition to science, mathematics and English, students could take 4 years of Latin, as well as courses in Greek, French, Spanish, and German. The College courses covered mathematics, history, English, science, Latin, French, Spanish, German, Greek, Italian, Bible, and Ethics. The school year consisted of 2 terms of 18 weeks each.

There were daily services in the chapel on campus, and Sunday services could be attended at any local church of the student's choice with a proper chaperone.

==== 1910 - 1911 ====
Two intermediate years were added to the school. Fr. Green left All Saints' to become rector at St. Andrews in Jackson.

==== 1911 - 1912 ====
Wellesley, Smith, Agnes Scott, Sophie Newcomb, Randolph-Macon and Vassar all spoke well of students accepted into their programs from the high school program at All Saints'. The high school was accredited by the University of Mississippi this year and accepted all college credits point by point. A business course was added that included typing, stenography, and bookkeeping. One more grade was added to the intermediate years so that the school now serviced grades 6 through 12 plus the college.

==== 1912 - 1913 ====
Baseball was added to the athletic department. A letter to benefactors mentioned the need for additional classroom space, an indoor gym, and a chapel.

==== 1913 - 1914 ====
The addition of a long-distance phone connection allowed students and parents better communication.

In 1925 construction began on a dormitory that would become Johnson Hall in honor of Mrs. J. W. Johnson who gave the money for its construction. Another new tradition started when the intramural basketball team was divided into two groups: The Swamp Angels and the Knockouts. The teams would later be the Angels and the Devils and would divide the entire student body into two competitive teams.

In 1942 Fr. Christian got the idea that All Saints' should belong to Mississippi, Louisiana and Arkansas. The board of trustees was adjusted to reflect members from the three dioceses.

The school admitted only white women and, after the Episcopal Church began to officially support desegregation in its educational institutions in the wake of Brown v. Board of Education, All Saints' desegregated.

The first male boarding students were admitted for the 1971–72 academic year. The first males to graduate were in the Class of 1972, five boarding students and one day student.

Charlene Eichelberger "Miss Ike" was hired in 1968 to head the Rec Department. She remained with the school until 1992 and returned briefly in 2006–2007 to oversee the cleaning of the campus, buildings, and grounds until AmeriCorps could utilize part of the campus for its programs. Miss Ike is credited with bringing national recognition of the Rec Program to All Saints' and she lived on campus throughout her tenure.

Fr. Dickson's son, Charlie, also worked many years, along with his wife Cassie, until the school closed in 2006. He was unable to attend All Saints' as it was still an all girls school when Fr. Dickson became Headmaster in 1968.

The school utilized the Level System (Levels 1-5 which dictated a student's privileges) rather than retaining the honor code from 1969 until 2002 at which time the Honor Code was introduced. In 2002, the campus went smoke-free. The trimester term was used from 1969 to 2006.

In 2003, the board voted to close the school but temporary financing and tremendous alumni support averted the close until 2006 when the board voted to close the school permanently.

The campus was leased by AmeriCorps until 2025. It is remains owned and maintained by the three dioceses of Mississippi, Arkansas, and Louisiana since 1942. Select employees still office on the campus, are employed by the church, and help with the upkeep of the campus.

=== Leadership ===
1909 - 1911	The Rev. William Mercer Green Jr., Dean
1911 - 1912	Dr. Thomas Pearce Bailey, Dean
1912 - 1937	The Rt. Rev. Theodore DuBose Bratton, President
1937 - 1958	The Rev. William Gerow Christian, Rector
1958 - 1961	The Rev. John Maury Allin, Rector
1962 - 1967	The Rev. John Stone Jenkins, Rector
1967 - 1968	The Rev. A Dean Calcote, Acting Rector
1968 - 1983	The Rev. Alex Dickson Jr., Rector and Headmaster
1983 - 1999	The Rev. David Luckett, Rector and Headmaster
2000 - 2001	Charles Craft, Interim Head
2001 - 2006	The Rev. Martin, Rector and Head
