= Girault M. Jones =

The Right Reverend Girault McArthur Jones D.D.
- Bishop of Louisiana
- Church: Episcopal Church
- Diocese: Louisiana
- Elected: November 17, 1948
- In office: 1949–1969
- Predecessor: John Long Jackson
- Successor: Iveson B. Noland

Orders
- Ordination: May 19, 1929 by William Mercer Green
- Consecration: March 9, 1949 by Henry Knox Sherrill

Personal details
- Born: June 30, 1904 Centerville, Mississippi, United States
- Died: April 29, 1998 (aged 93) Nashville, Tennessee, United States
- Buried: University of the South Cemetery, Sewanee, Tennessee
- Denomination: Anglican
- Parents: Ackland Hartley Jones & Elizabeth Girault Shaifer
- Spouse: Virginia Hester Wallace (m. 1930, d. 1930); Kathleen Platt (m. 1935)
- Children: 2
- Education: University of Mississippi

Girault McArthur Jones (June 30, 1904 - April 29, 1998) was seventh Bishop of Louisiana in The Episcopal Church, elected in 1948.

He was born and raised in Mississippi and attended college at the University of Mississippi and the University of the South, where he earned a bachelor of divinity. Following his election as bishop, he was awarded a Doctor of Divinity by his alma mater. He later served as Chancellor of University of the South.

== Early life and education ==
Born and raised in Centreville, Mississippi, to parents Ackland Hartley Jones and Elizabeth Girault Shaifer, Jones was educated at a local high school before attending Staunton Military Academy in Virginia, where he graduated. He studied at the segregated University of Mississippi, followed by the School of Theology at the University of the South, from which he graduated with a Bachelor of Divinity in 1928.

== Ministry ==
He was ordained deacon on June 17, 1928, by Bishop Theodore DuBose Bratton and priest on May 19, 1929, by Bishop William Mercer Green. He then served as a missionary of rural Southwestern Mississippi until 1931. Between 1931 and 1936, he was rector of Trinity Church in Pass Christian, Mississippi. Between 1936 and 1949, he was rector of St Andrew's Church in New Orleans. He served as president of the standing committee of Louisiana between 1944 and 1949, and as deputy to the General Conventions of 1934, 1940, 1943, and 1946.

On November 17, 1948, Jones was elected Bishop of Louisiana at a special meeting of the diocesan convention, succeeding Bishop John Long Jackson. Jones was consecrated on March 9, 1949. He served as diocesan bishop from 1949 until his retirement in 1969.

Following his election as a bishop, he was awarded a Doctor of Divinity degree from the University of the South. He eventually served as Chancellor of the university, from 1967 to 1973.

== Private life ==
Jones married twice. His first wife was Virginia Hester Wallace. They were married in 1930, but she died seven months into their marriage. In 1935 he married Kathleen Platt, and had two daughters with her. She and their daughters survived him.

Jones was an active Freemason, initiated in Lumberton Lodge No. 417, Lumberton, Mississippi, and later a member of Louisiana Lodge No. 102, New Orleans. He served as Grand Chaplain of the Grand Lodge of Louisiana in 1954.

== See also ==
Jones, Girault M. (1984). That Reminds Me. Sewanee, Tennessee, USA: University of the South.
