= Episcopal Diocese of Louisiana =

Episcopal Church diocese in the US

Diocese of Louisiana
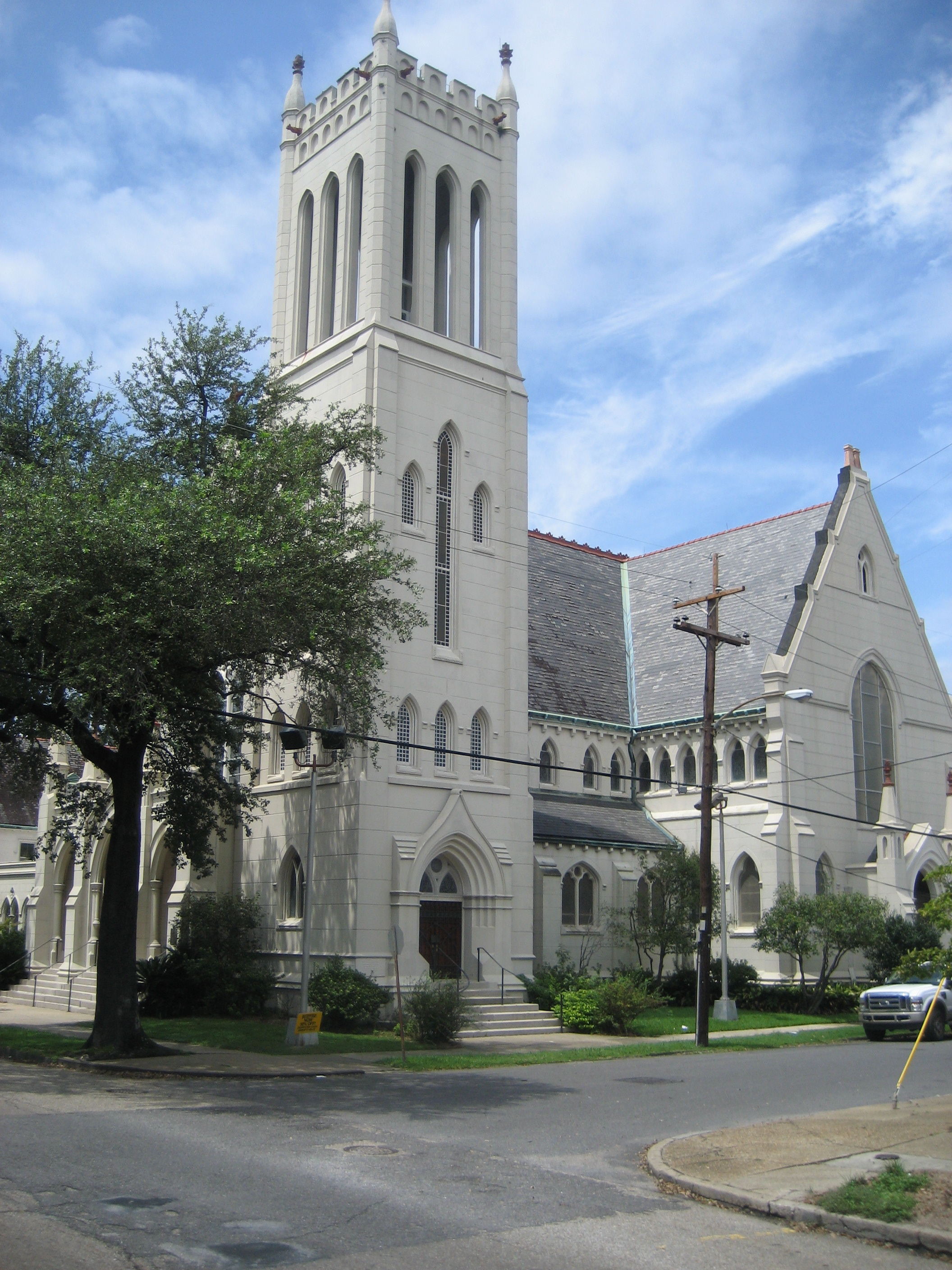
- Christ Church Cathedral

Location
- Country: United States
- Ecclesiastical province: Province IV

Statistics
- Congregations: 47 (2024)
- Members: 13,660 (2023)

Information
- Denomination: Episcopal Church
- Established: April 28, 1838
- Cathedral: Christ Church Cathedral

Current leadership
- Bishop: Shannon Rogers Duckworth

Map
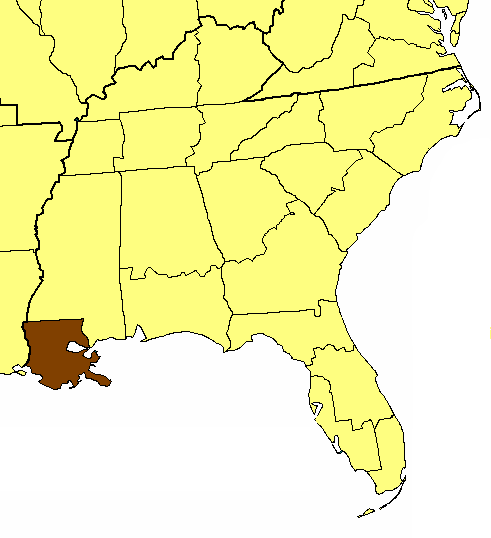
- Location of the Diocese of Louisiana

Website
- www.edola.org

The Episcopal Diocese of Louisiana is the diocese of the Episcopal Church in the eastern part of the state of Louisiana. The see city is New Orleans. In 2024, the diocese reported average Sunday attendance (ASA) of 3,303 persons, down from ASA of 4,552 in 2015. Public membership figures cited a decline in membership from 17,348 in 2015 to 13,660 in 2023. No membership statistics were reported in 2024 national parochial reports. The 47 reporting congregations of the diocese had $12,081,429 in plate and pledge income in 2024.

== History ==
Christ Church, New Orleans, (now the Cathedral Church of the Diocese of Louisiana) was the first non-Roman Catholic congregation organized in the Louisiana Purchase when it was established in 1805. When religious freedom came to the newly purchased American territory, the non-Roman Catholics in New Orleans organized to form a congregation in New Orleans. Although the names of only 36 subscribers are recorded for that initial meeting, there were 53 votes cast in the decision as to what denomination of church this would be. There were 45 votes for Episcopal, seven for Presbyterian and one for Methodist. In 1805 Philander Chase came to New Orleans (later Bishop of Ohio, Illinois and Presiding Bishop of the Episcopal Church). He organized Christ Church and began worship in the Cabildo on November 17 of that year. The support of philanthropist Judah Touro made possible the founding of Christ Church.

In 1838 the Diocese of Louisiana was organized and in 1841 Leonidas Polk was appointed by the General Convention of the Episcopal Church in the United States as the first Bishop of the new Diocese. Polk had been a Missionary Bishop of the Southwest and was responsible for the founding and consecration of many congregations in Louisiana. He was also the first foreign missionary Bishop of the Episcopal Church as his oversight extended also to the Republic of Texas. Polk, a graduate of West Point, was to serve the Confederacy during the American Civil War as a General in the Army. He also was the leading founder of the University of the South in Sewanee, Tennessee. At the outbreak of the Civil War, Polk pulled the Louisiana Convention out of the Episcopal Church of the United States and was one of the leaders of the breakaway Protestant Episcopal Church in the Confederate States of America.

Iveson Noland was diocesan bishop for only six years, 1969-1975, his life cut short by the crash of a jetliner in New York City. Noland was the first native of Louisiana to serve as Bishop of the Diocese. He was elected Bishop Suffragan in 1952 and served under Girault M. Jones until being made Diocesan upon Jones' retirement. There were many challenges to the Church during Noland's episcopacy, some internal, such as revision of the Book of Common Prayer, and some external, such as the war in Vietnam.

James B. Brown served as the ninth Bishop of Louisiana from 1976 until his retirement in 1998. Early in his episcopate, the Diocese, which then comprised the entire state of Louisiana was split. The western part of the state is now the Diocese of Western Louisiana. Brown chose to remain in the southeast part of the state and maintained his cathedra at Christ Church, New Orleans. These were challenging years in Louisiana; the decline of the petroleum-based economy, the rapidly changing demographics of the urban centers of the Diocese, and a rise in congregational parochialism were constant hardships. Despite these challenges, the Church in Louisiana moved ahead under Brown's leadership. New congregations were established as a diocesan initiative at Mandeville, Harvey, and Baton Rouge. Venture in Mission proved a successful boost to the Church locally and internationally. He established the Diocesan College of Presbyters which continues even now as a means of fellowship, learning, and renewal for the clergy of the Diocese. Brown also founded the Solomon Episcopal Conference Center at Robert, Louisiana.

The episcopate of the tenth bishop of Louisiana, Charles Edward Jenkins III (1998-2010) came to be overshadowed by the destruction caused by Hurricane Katrina in August 2005. Exhausted by the emotional trauma of the disaster and its aftermath, Jenkins announced his wish to retire in December 2008 and retired in January 2010. On December 5, 2009, the Diocesan Convention elected Morris K. Thompson, Dean of Christ Church Cathedral in Lexington, Kentucky, as 11th Bishop of Louisiana. His episcopal ordination took place on May 8, 2010 with his seating in Christ Church Cathedral to follow on Ascension Day, Thursday May 13, 2010.

== Bishops of Louisiana ==
	Honorific & Name	Dates
1st	Leonidas Polk	1841-1864 (Missionary Bishop of Arkansas, 1838-1841)
2nd	Joseph P.B. Wilmer	1866-1878
3rd	John Nicholas Galleher	1880-1891
4th	Davis Sessums	1891-1929
5th	James Craik Morris	1930-1939
6th	John Long Jackson	1940-1948
7th	Girault McArthur Jones	1949-1969
8th	Iveson Batchelor Noland	1969-1975
9th	James B. Brown	1976-1998
10th	Charles Edward Jenkins III	1998-2009
11th	Morris King Thompson	2010-2022
12th	Shannon Rogers Duckworth	2022-
