= John Nicholas Galleher =

American bishop (1839–1891)

The Right Reverend John Nicholas Galleher S.T.D., D.D.
- Bishop of Louisiana
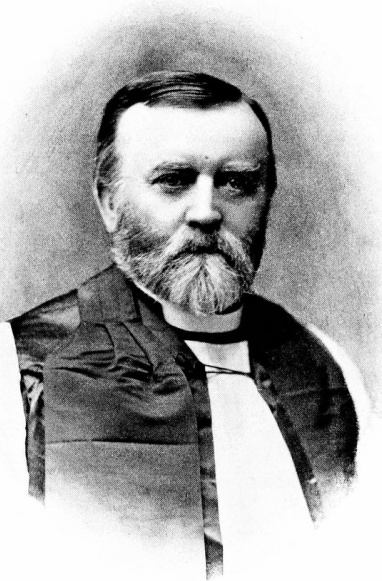
- Church: Episcopal Church
- Diocese: Louisiana
- Elected: 1879
- In office: 1880–1891
- Predecessor: Joseph Pere Bell Wilmer
- Successor: Davis Sessums

Orders
- Ordination: May 30, 1869 by Joseph Pere Bell Wilmer
- Consecration: February 5, 1880 by William Mercer Green

Personal details
- Born: February 17, 1839 Washington, Kentucky, U.S.
- Died: December 7, 1891 (aged 52) New Orleans, Louisiana, U.S.
- Buried: Cave Hill Cemetery; Louisville, Kentucky, U.S.
- Denomination: Episcopalian
- Parents: Corbin Galleher & Elizabeth Johnson Riley
- Spouse: Charlotte Barbee
- Children: 5

John Nicholas Galleher (February 17, 1839 – December 7, 1891) was third bishop of the Episcopal Diocese of Louisiana from 1880 to 1891.

== Early life and education ==
Galleher was born on February 17, 1839, in Washington, Kentucky, to Corbin Galleher (1805-1873), a merchant and inn keeper, and Elizabeth Johnson Riley (1809-1890). He received his early education at Maysville, Kentucky, and attended the University of Virginia from 1856 and 1858. Galleher served in the Confederate army under Simon Bolivar Buckner. After the war, he commenced studies in Theology and practiced law in Louisville, Kentucky after which he attended the General Theological Seminary. In 1875 he received an honorary Doctor of Divinity degree from Columbia University.

== Ordained ministry ==
Galleher was ordained a deacon on June 7, 1868, in Christ Church Cathedral in Louisville, Kentucky, by Bishop George David Cummins. He served as assistant in Christ Church Louisville. On May 30, 1869, he was ordained a priest by Bishop Joseph Pere Bell Wilmer of Louisiana in Trinity Church, New Orleans after which he became rector of the same church, a post he held till 1871. Later he was appointed rector of Memorial Church in Baltimore and then rector of Zion Church in New York City.

== Episcopacy ==
Galleher was elected Bishop of Louisiana and consecrated on February 5, 1880, by Bishop William Mercer Green of Mississippi, and co-consecrated by Richard Hooker Wilmer of Alabama, Charles Franklin Robertson of Missouri and Thomas Underwood Dudley of Kentucky. Galleher is mostly remembered as the minister who administered the last rites to Jefferson Davis. He died on December 7, 1891, in New Orleans, Louisiana.

== Personal life ==
Galleher married Charlotte Barbee in 1868 and together they had five children.

== Publications ==
Perry, William Stevens: John Nicholas Galleher. In: Episcopate in America - Sketches Biographical & Bibliographical of the Bishops of the American Church. 1895, p. 262-263.
