= John Long Jackson =

American Episcopal bishop

The Right Reverend John Long Jackson D.D.
- Bishop of Louisiana
- Church: Episcopal Church
- Diocese: Louisiana
- Elected: January 1940
- In office: 1940–1948
- Predecessor: James Craik Morris
- Successor: Girault M. Jones

Orders
- Ordination: June 11, 1909 by Alfred Harding
- Consecration: May 1, 1940 by Henry St. George Tucker

Personal details
- Born: March 28, 1884 Baltimore, Maryland, United States
- Died: September 2, 1948 (aged 64) Winchester, Virginia, United States
- Denomination: Anglican
- Parents: Edward Thornton Jackson & Mary Helen Long
- Spouse: Eleanor Crawford (m. June 18, 1913)
- Children: 1

John Long Jackson (March 28, 1884 – September 2, 1948) was bishop of the Episcopal Diocese of Louisiana from 1940 to 1948.

== Biography ==
Jackson was born on March 28, 1884, in Baltimore, Maryland, the son of Edward Thornton Jackson and Mary Helen Long. He was educated at the Episcopal High School in Alexandria, Virginia. He later studied at Johns Hopkins University, from where he graduated with a Bachelor of Arts in 1905, and the Virginia Theological Seminary. He was awarded a Doctor of Divinity from Sewanee: The University of the South and the Virginia Seminary, respectively, both in 1908.

On June 14, 1908, he was ordained deacon by Bishop William Paret of Maryland, and on June 11, 1909, he was ordained a priest by Bishop Alfred Harding of Washington. He served as curate at Trinity Church in Towson, Maryland from 1908 till 1909, and curate of St Paul's Church in Baltimore, Maryland, between 1909 and 1910. Jackson married Elizabeth Eleanor Crawford on June 18, 1913.

He became rector of Emmanuel Church in Harrisonburg, Virginia in 1910. Jackson became the first rector of St. Martin's Episcopal Church in Charlotte, North Carolina, in 1914. He remained at St. Martin's until his election as Bishop of Louisiana in 1940, giving him a 26-year rectorship at the parish.

In 1940, Jackson was elected Bishop of Louisiana at a diocesan convention, succeeding James Craik Morris, and was consecrated on May 1. During his time as bishop the number of communicants in the diocese increased by 1680. Six missions were created and eleven new parishes were established. Jackson also took part in Episcopal conference work at Kanuga Lake in North Carolina. In 1941, he was listed among the bishops directing adult, clergy and college conferences at Kanuga.

Jackson was associated with the creation of Camp Hardtner, the Episcopal summer camp in Pollock, Louisiana. He began work on the project shortly after his consecration in 1940. In 1941, Quintin T. Hardtner sold Jackson 40 acres on Fish Creek, and another 40 acres were acquired five years later. Jackson and the Rev. Joseph S. Ditchburn later worked to raise money for the camp, and in 1947 Jackson obtained surplus buildings from Camp Beauregard for use at the site. Camp Hardtner welcomed its first campers in 1948.

Jackson died in office on September 2, 1948.
