= Christ Church Cathedral (New Orleans) =

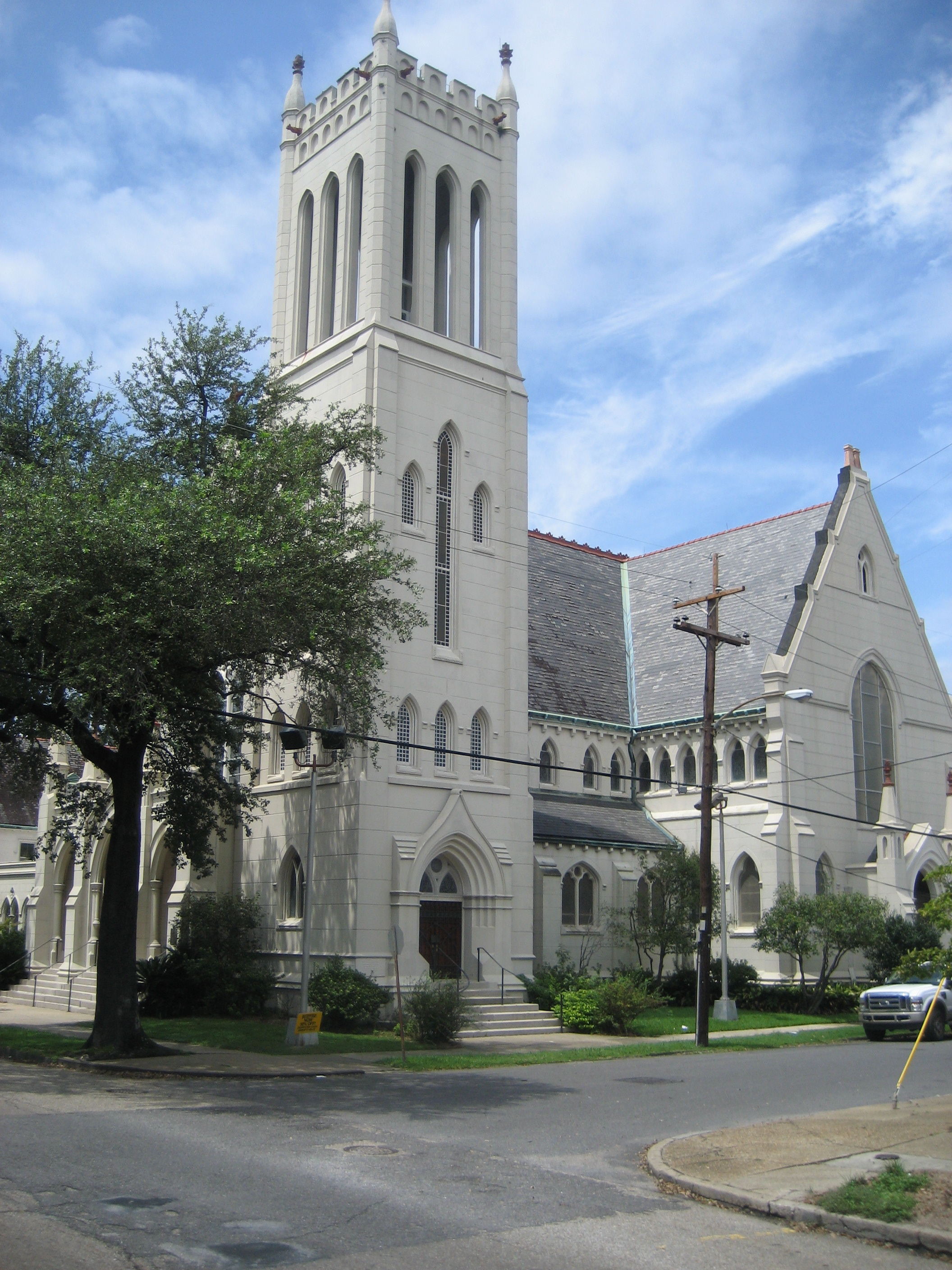
- Christ Church Cathedral building on St. Charles Avenue in 2008

- Location within Louisiana
- 29°55′49″N 90°5′16″W
- Location: New Orleans
- Country: United States
- Denomination: Episcopal Church
- Website: www.cccnola.org

History
- Status: Active
- Founded: 10 June 1803

Architecture
- Functional status: Cathedral
- Architect: Lawrence B. Valk
- Style: Neo-Gothic
- Years built: 1886

Administration
- Diocese: Episcopal Diocese of Louisiana

Clergy
- Bishop: The Rt. Rev. Shannon Rogers Duckworth
- Dean: The Very Rev. David Allard duPlantier

Christ Church Cathedral, located today at 2919 St. Charles Avenue, in New Orleans, Louisiana, in the United States, was the first non-Roman Catholic church founded in the entire Louisiana Purchase territory. It was founded in 1803 as Christ's Church by the Protestant inhabitants of New Orleans, and is today the official seat of the Bishop of Louisiana, in the Episcopal Diocese of Louisiana.

In 2019, the cathedral reported 768 members; in 2025, it reported 684 members. Plate and pledge financial support reported by the cathedral in 2025 was $565,105. Average Sunday Attendance (ASA) reported by the cathedral in 2025 was 233 persons. This was a relative decrease from ASA of 282 persons reported in 2016.

== Early history ==
In June 1803, 53 Protestants responded to an appeal to form a Protestant congregation in the predominantly Roman Catholic City of New Orleans. After a preliminary meeting, the choice of denomination was put up to a vote. The ballot results were: Episcopal, 45 votes; Presbyterian, 7 votes; Methodist, 1 vote. With the result of the vote, the Episcopal congregation of Christ's Church was founded. Soon after, a call was sent to various colleges and churches in the east for recommendations for a suitable clergyman. On November 16, 1805, Philander Chase, a young minister from Poughkeepsie arrived with a letter of introduction from Bishop Benjamin Moore of New York. The founders approved of young Chase and at eleven o'clock in the morning of the following day, Philander Chase preached his first sermon at The Cabildo on the Place d'Armes.

Services were held in various public buildings until 1816 when the first Christ church was erected at the riverside corner of Canal and Bourbon streets. No sketch exists of this first Christ Church. Records show it was designed by Henry Sellon Boneval Latrobe, son of the distinguished architect Benjamin Henry Latrobe. The building was octagonal in shape, 60 feet (18 m) in diameter with a domed roof surmounted by a cupola and constructed in brick.

== Second and third church building ==
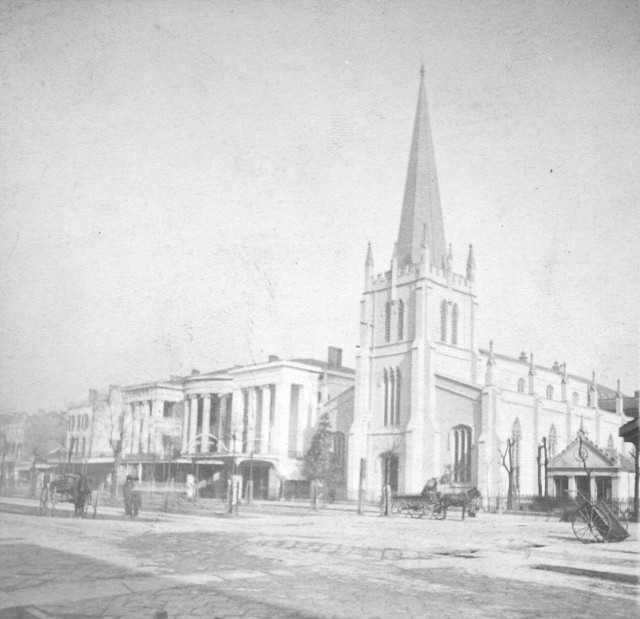
The third Christ Church building, c. 1870s

By 1833 the first church building proved to be too small for the growing congregation. By 1835 plans for a new church building on the same site were drawn by the noted architects James Gallier Sr. and James H. Dakin. The new building was in the design of a Greek Temple, fronted by six Ionic columns supporting a pediment. It was consecrated on March 26, 1837.

In 1845 Francis Lister Hawks became rector of Christ Church and he submitted plans for a third church building. One of the plans had been drawn by Thomas Wharton, drawing teacher and architect. In 1846 the Vestry contracted James Gallier Jr., son of the famous Gallier who designed the second church, to build the new church following Hawks' and Wharton's plans, for $56,000. The third building was Gothic in style, with buttresses and a central tower, and was erected on the lakeside corner of Canal and Dauphine streets. At this time the second building was bought by Judah Touro and became a synagogue. The Gothic style church served the Christ's Church congregation for 40 years. In 1873 Jewell's Crescent City said of this building, "Christ Church is one of the most elegant church structures in New Orleans." Neither this nor the earlier buildings still survives.

== Fourth church building ==
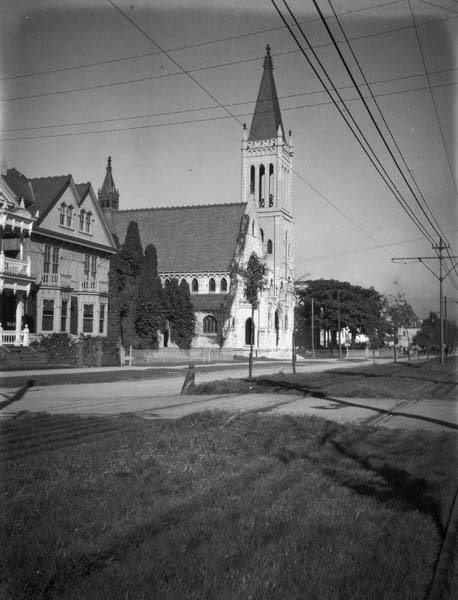
Early 20th-century photo of the church with the original steeple, which was destroyed in the Great New Orleans Hurricane of 1915

By the late 19th century, New Orleans had grown tremendously. Most of the parishioners of Christ Church lived in uptown New Orleans and it was decided to relocate the church in that area. The corner of Canal and Dauphine was valuable commercial property. The present property on the corner of St. Charles Avenue and Sixth Street was purchased. The cornerstone for the present Christ Church was laid on June 10, 1886. This fourth building, also Gothic in style, was designed by architect Lawrence B. Valk of New York. Through a devoted benefactor, New Orleans architect Thomas Sully's chapel of matching design was added in 1889. Since it was debt free, it was consecrated prior to the cathedral.

In 1959 the latest expansion program was begun—providing space for administrative offices, the church school, library, assembly hall, and service areas. The architects were Freret and Wolf. The Gothic design of the Cathedral and chapel were followed.

James F. Hull followed Philander Chase, who went on to become the first Bishop of Ohio in 1819 (where he founded Kenyon College), the first Bishop of Illinois in 1835, and in 1852 he became Presiding Bishop of the Episcopal Church; Nathaniel Wheaton; Francis L. Hawks (who was chosen the first president of the University of Louisiana, which later became Tulane University); Edmund Neville; William Thomas Leacock, who served Christ Church for 30 years; Alexander I. Drysdale and David Sessums, who left to become the 4th Bishop of Louisiana, an office he held for 38 years.

== Christ Church becomes a cathedral ==
Under Bishop Sessums' sponsorship, Christ Church became a cathedral in 1891 and young Quincy Ewing served briefly as its first dean. He was followed by F. I. Paradise, Charles L. Wells, William A. Barr, J.D. Cummins, William H. Nes, Albert R. Stuart, who was elected Bishop of Georgia in 1954, William E. Craig, Leonard E. Nelson, Richard Rowland, David Lowry, John Senette, and the present dean, David A. duPlantier.

Christ Church served not only its parishioners, but the community as a whole. It was instrumental in founding the chapel for French Protestants, started St. Peter's Mission (1846) which later became St. Anna's Episcopal Church; founded a children's home in 1860, aided in founding Trinity, Calvary, and St. Andrew's Episcopal churches. In a broader context, Christ Church has a special interest in the University of the South in Sewanee, Tennessee, the founding of which was led by the first Bishop of Louisiana, the Right Reverend Leonidas Polk.

== Present ==
Worship includes four Sunday services, as well as the daily offices and weekday celebrations of the Holy Eucharist, offering a rich variety of Anglican worship.

The cathedral became the first Episcopal church to commission a jazz composition when it commissioned one by New Orleans jazz musician Irvin Mayfield to commemorate Hurricane Katrina. Mayfield's composition, titled "All the Saints", was premiered on November 17, 2005, at the cathedral in conjunction with the bicentennial of Episcopal ministry in New Orleans.

The cathedral is headed by its current dean and rector, the Very Reverend David Allard duPlantier, and is the seat of the twelfth bishop of Louisiana, the Rt. Rev. Shannon Rogers Duckworth.

== See also ==
- List of the Episcopal cathedrals of the United States
- List of cathedrals in the United States
