= E. Otis Charles =

American Episcopal bishop (1926–2013)

The Right Reverend E. Otis Charles
- Bishop of Utah
- Church: Episcopal Church
- Diocese: Utah
- In office: 1971–1986
- Predecessor: Richard S. Watson
- Successor: George F. Bates

Orders
- Ordination: October 7, 1951 by Alfred L. Banyard
- Consecration: September 12, 1971 by John E. Hines

Personal details
- Born: Edgar Otis Charles; April 24, 1926 Norristown, Pennsylvania, US
- Died: December 26, 2013 (aged 87) San Francisco, California, US
- Denomination: Episcopalian
- Education: Trinity College; Union Theological Seminary; Creighton University

Edgar Otis Charles (called Otis; April 24, 1926 – December 26, 2013) was the eighth bishop of the Episcopal Diocese of Utah.

== Early life ==
Charles was born in Norristown, Pennsylvania. He attended Trinity College, receiving a B.A. While at Trinity, he was a member of St. Anthony Hall. He attended the Union Theological Seminary in New York City where he received a Bachelor of Sacred Theology degree in 1951 and a Doctor of Divinity degree in 1983. He received a Doctorate of Sacred Theology from Creighton University.

== Career ==
In May 1951, Charles was ordained as a priest. He served at St. John's Church in Elizabeth, New Jersey. He was a vicar of St. Andrew's in Beacon, New York. Charles served as a priest in the Episcopal Diocese of Connecticut from 1959 to 1971. In 1958, he became a faculty member of the Episcopal Theological School. There, he served as a dean from 1969 to 1974.

He was also a rector of St. John's Parish in Washington, Connecticut from 1959 until 1967. While in Washington, he helped establish the Washington Montessori School and reopened the Wykeham Rise School that focused on the visual and performing arts.

From 1968 until 1982 he was a member and president of the Standing Liturgical Commission, which developed the 1979 edition of the Book of Common Prayer.

In 1971, he was elected Bishop of Utah and served in that position through 1986. At the same time, he was also the Bishop-in-Charge of the Episcopal Church in Navajoland for two years. While in Utah, Charles was involved in the peace movement. He opposed Nevada and Utah being launching sites for the MX missile. He was board chair of St. Mark's Hospital and of Rowland Hall-St. Mark's School. He also helped create the Hospice of Salt Lake City.

In the House of Bishops, Charles was chair of the Prayer a member of the Bishops' Committee on Racism. In June 1985, Charles became dean and president of the Episcopal Divinity School in Cambridge, Massachusetts. He retired in 1993.

In 1993, he relocated to San Francisco, where he helped to found and was the executive director of Oasis/California, a gay and lesbian Episcopal ministry. He was also an interim dean at the School for Deacons in California. He also became the Bishop-in-Residence at the Church of St. John-the-Evangelist in San Francisco.

Charles was also a founding editor of Millennium3 which was distributed to all Episcopal clergy.

== Honors ==
The Otis Charles Chair of Pastoral Theology was endowed at the Episcopal Divinity School in 1997.

== Personal life ==
Charles married Elvira Latta on May 26, 1951. They had five children: Christopher, Nicholas, Emilie, Timothy, and Elvira. After his retirement in 1993, Charles publicly came out as gay, the first Christian bishop ever to take such a step. However, he told his wife that he was gay in 1976. He and his wife divorced shortly after his public announcement. Charles said, "I was ashamed of myself for remaining silent when the church was involved in an acrimonious debate about the whole question of gay people in the life of the church. I couldn't live with that any longer. I came to realize that I was only going to wither and die and it would be a destructive relationship for my wife and myself."

On April 24, 2004, he had a commitment ceremony with Felipe Sanchez-Paris (1941 – July 31, 2013). He legally married Sanchez-Paris on September 29, 2008. Sanchez-Paris was a retired professor and political organizer; he had four ex-wives and four children. The two appear in the documentary film Love Free or Die, testifying about a resolution directing the Episcopal Church to create a provisional rite for the blessing of same-gender relationships at its 2009 General Convention in Anaheim, California. Sanchez-Paris died on July 30, 2013.

In 2013, Charles died in San Francisco, California. He is buried alongside Sanchez-Paris at St. Mark's Cathedral, Salt Lake City, Utah.

Episcopal Church (USA) titles
Preceded by Richard S. Watson	Bishop of Utah; 1971–1993	Succeeded by George E. Bates
