= Arthur Moulton =

American bishop

The Right Reverend Arthur Moulton
- Bishop of Utah
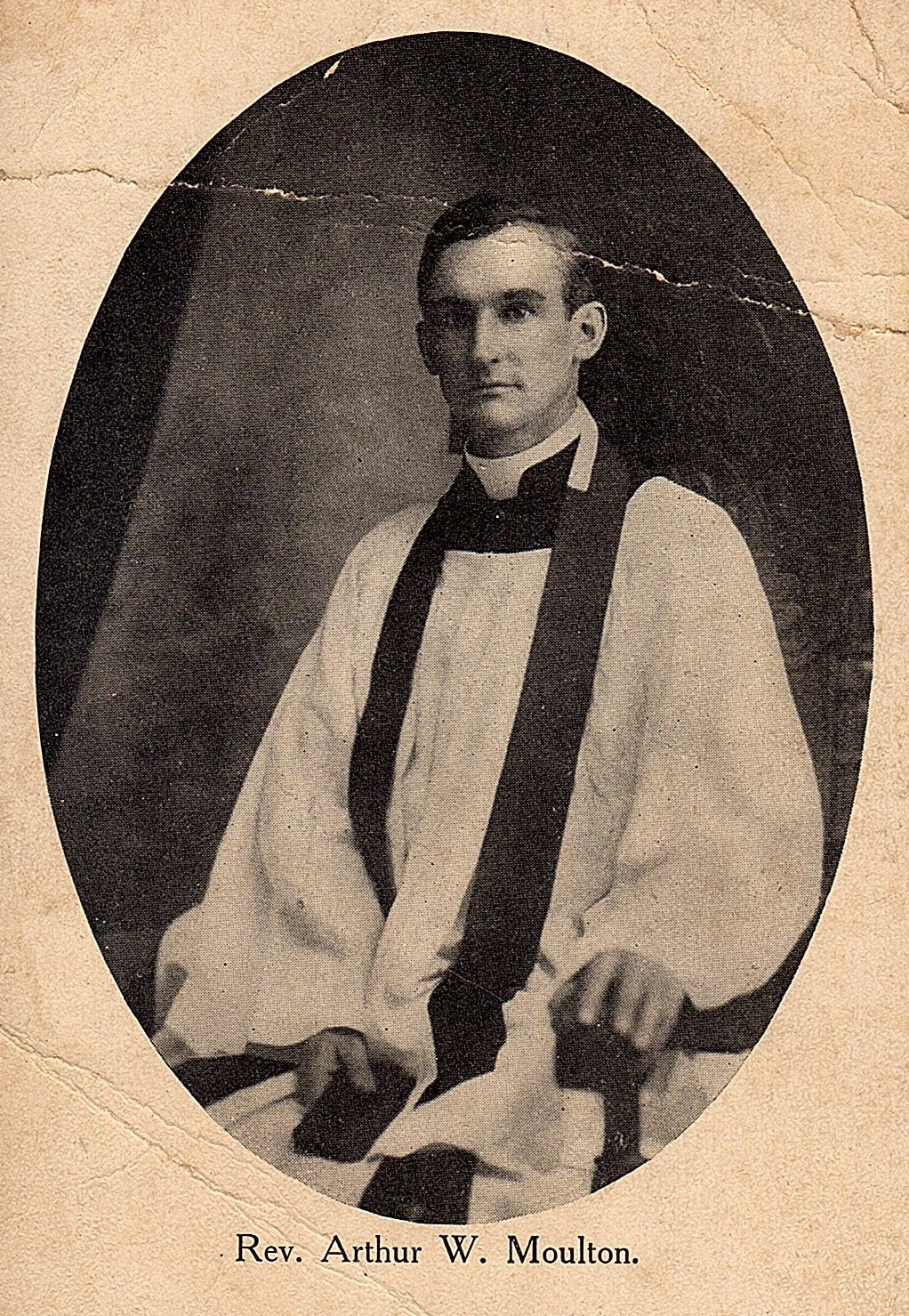
- Moulton as Rector of Grace Church, c. 1911
- Church: Episcopal Church
- In office: 1920–1946
- Predecessor: Paul Jones
- Successor: Stephen C. Clark

Orders
- Ordination: 1901
- Consecration: April 29, 1920 by Daniel S. Tuttle

Personal details
- Born: May 3, 1873 Worcester, Massachusetts, United States
- Died: August 18, 1962 (aged 89) Salt Lake City, Utah, United States
- Buried: Mount Olivet Cemetery
- Denomination: Anglican
- Parents: John D. Moulton & Emma Jane Moulton
- Spouse: Mary C. Prentice
- Education: Hobart College

Arthur Wheelock Moulton (May 3, 1873 – August 18, 1962) was an American Episcopalian cleric who served as Bishop of Utah from 1920 to 1946. Moulton was one of the recipients of the inaugural Stalin Peace Prize in 1951.

== Early life and career ==
Moulton was born at Worcester, Massachusetts. His father, a store clerk, died early in his life, leaving Moulton to take care of his mother. He graduated from Hobart College, where he was a member of the Sigma Chi fraternity, then attended the Episcopal General Theological Seminary, and the Episcopal Theological School. Throughout college and seminary, Moulton worked as a door-to-door salesman to support himself and his family.

He was ordained a priest in the Protestant Episcopal Church in 1901. From 1900 to 1918, he was curate and rector of Grace Church, Lawrence, Massachusetts. He was popular and respected at his parish, and also served in World War I as a chaplain in the field artillery and at a base hospital in France, for which he was given the honorary rank of colonel in the French Army. His predecessor at Grace Church, William Appleton Lawrence, recognized his talents and nominated him to become a bishop in 1919.

After six months of deliberation, he decided to accept his nomination to the episcopacy. On April 29, 1920, he was consecrated bishop of Utah at his parish in Lawrence; he would serve as bishop until his retirement in 1946. Moulton was a personable cleric and well-liked among his small flock, and had limited but cordial contact with the leadership of the Church of Jesus Christ of Latter-Day Saints. Despite this, Moulton retained a negative personal opinion of the LDS Church, regarding it as a "monstrous Mormon incubus".

Upon arriving in Utah, Moulton took charge of a small and financially challenged institution. The end of World War I saw the end of government mining and rail contracts. The economic downturn continued into the Great Depression, and Moulton's leadership did little to reassure the national church. Moulton's skills in fundraising and administration were limited, but he oversaw the construction of some new churches and missions to the Uintah Reservation and workers. He sought a transfer away from Utah, and unsuccessfully applied to become Bishop of Western Massachusetts in 1937.

Around the same time, Moulton's social and political activism began to draw attention on the national level. While not a communist, he belabored that communism was a legitimate reaction to poverty, and believed that the expansion of communism was an inevitability which he hoped to "direct" toward Christianity. Moulton also professed isolationist and pacifist beliefs prior to World War II. The outbreak of war was a boon to the Utah economy and Moulton's diocese, prompting an influx of federal money and faithful which allowed Moulton to complete projects long put on hold. Moulton retired a year after the war's end, in 1946. The national church assessed his tenure poorly, finding his model of leadership to be "disastrously discouraging to clergy and laity alike."

== In retirement ==
Continuing his support of radical causes in retirement, he campaigned for world peace and lent his name to several communist and communist front groups to that end. Soon after retirement, he became an honorary co-chair the American Committee for the Protection of the Foreign Born (ACPFB), an organization whose stated purpose was to oppose capricious deportations. The second honorary co-chair was Louise Pettibone Smith. In 1949, he became involved in the Committee for Peaceful Alternatives to the Atlantic Pact, which called for an agreement ensuring that atomic bombs not be used in warfare. In 1949, he spoke at a communist-affiliated conference for peace held in Madison Square Garden. Moulton was unaware of the ACPFB until he was informed that he had been elected as co-chair, and did not contribute writings to its organs or visit the group's headquarters. He stated that he accepted the position "to help out and be nice".

Moulton was surprised to hear that he was one of the inaugural awardees of the Stalin Peace Prize in 1951. Despite his affiliation with communist front groups, he was not known as a high-profile supporter of the Soviet Union, let alone a communist. He turned down the Prize's 100,000 ruble (about $25,000) award, stating that "the only award I want in working for peace is peace." He was probably nominated for the prize by Abner Green, a leader of the ACPFB. The ACPFB lost much of its support after the Soviet invasion of Hungary in 1956, although Moulton remained associated with the organization until his death.

== Personal life ==
Moulton was married to the former Mary Corinne Prentice, his second cousin. She was socially withdrawn and did not accompany her husband at social or church-related events, although they had a close, affectionate relationship and never separated. The couple had a daughter, Mary Caroline, and a son, Ogden. Ogden went on to follow his father into the Episcopal priesthood.

He wrote Memoir of Augustine H. Amory (1909) and It Comes to Pass (1916). He was awarded an honorary A.M. degree by Hobart College in 1909. He died in Salt Lake City, Utah in 1962.
