= RHSM =

RHSM may stand for:

- Red Hat Subscription Manager - content delivery for Red Hat customers
- Rowland Hall-St. Mark's School - a school in Utah
