= Scott B. Hayashi =

The Right Reverend Scott B. Hayashi
- 11th Bishop of Utah
- Church: The Episcopal Church of the United States (TEC)
- Province: Province VIII
- Diocese: Diocese of Utah
- Elected: May 22, 2010
- Installed: November 7, 2010
- Term ended: 2022
- Predecessor: Carolyn Tanner Irish
- Successor: Phyllis A. Spiegel

Orders
- Ordination: 1984
- Consecration: November 6, 2010 by Katharine Jefferts Schori

Personal details
- Born: December 9, 1953 (age 72) Tacoma, Washington, U.S.
- Denomination: Anglican
- Spouse: Amy Perlman O'Donnell
- Children: 3 daughters
- Education: University of Washington; Harvard Divinity School

Scott B. Hayashi (born December 9, 1953) was the eleventh bishop of the Episcopal Diocese of Utah.

== Early life and family ==
Hayashi was born in Tacoma, Washington on December 9, 1953. He was educated at the University of Washington, where awarded a Bachelor of Arts degree in social work. Then he attended Harvard Divinity School, earning a Master of Divinity degree in 1981. While at Harvard, Hayashi met his wife, Amy Perlman O'Donnell, who was then a student at Episcopal Divinity School. They have three daughters.

== Priestly career ==
He was ordained in the Anglican ministry in 1984. His first pastoral appointments were as the vicar of St. John the Baptist Episcopal Mission and St. Dunstan's Episcopal Mission, both in Washington state, 1984–1989. Afterwards, he was rector of the Episcopal Church of the Good Shepherd in Ogden, Utah, 1989–1998; then rector of Christ Church Episcopal Church in Portola Valley/Woodside, California, 1998–2005; and canon to the ordinary in the Episcopal Diocese of Chicago, 2005–2010.

== Episcopal career ==
In the second ballot, Hayashi was elected the 11th Bishop of Utah on May 22, 2010. His consecration took place at The Grand America Hotel in Salt Lake City on November 6, 2010, with the Episcopal Church's presiding bishop, the Most Reverend Katharine Jefferts Schori, serving as the principal consecrator. The following day, Hayashi was installed in a special ceremony at St. Mark's Cathedral, Salt Lake City on November 7, 2010.

In October 2019, Hayashi announced that he would be retiring with elections for the next bishop expected to take place in 2021.

== See also ==
- List of Episcopal bishops of the United States
- Historical list of the Episcopal bishops of the United States
- Episcopal Church in the United States of America

Episcopal Church (USA) titles
Preceded by Carolyn Tanner Irish	11th Bishop of Utah; 2010 - 2022	Succeeded by Phyllis A. Spiegel
