= R. Carlos Nakai discography =

This is a discography of Native American flute player R. Carlos Nakai.

== Discography ==
- Changes (1983, Canyon Records)
- Cycles (1985, Canyon Records)
- Journeys (1986, Canyon Records)
- Jackalope (1986, Canyon Records) with Jackalope
- Earth Spirit (1987, Canyon Records)
- Sundance Season (1988, Celestial Harmonies)
- Carry the Gift (1988, Canyon Records) with William Eaton
- Desert Dance (1988, Celestial Harmonies)
- Canyon Trilogy (1989, Canyon Records)
  - Rereleased on vinyl in a limited edition of 1,000 copies by Dark Horse Records/BMG Rights Management for Record Store Day 2026
- Winter Dreams (1990, Canyon Records) with William Eaton
- Natives (1990, Silver Wave Records) with Peter Kater
- Spirit Horses (1991, Canyon Records) with James DeMars
- Emergence: Songs of the Rainbow World (1992, Canyon Records)
- Ancestral Voices (1992, Canyon Records) with William Eaton
- Weavings (1992, Canyon Records) with Jackalope
- Migration (1992, Silver Wave Records) with Peter Kater, David Darling, Paul McCandless and Mark Miller
- Boat People (A Musical Codex) (1993, Canyon Records) with Jackalope
- Dances With Rabbits (1993, Canyon Records) with Jackalope
- How the West Was Lost (1993, Silver Wave Records) with Peter Kater
- Honorable Sky (1994, Silver Wave Records) with Peter Kater, David Darling, Paul McCandles and Mark Miller
- Native Tapestry (1994, Canyon Records) with James DeMars
- Island of Bows (1994, Canyon Records) with Wind Travelin' Band, Shonosuke Okhura and Oki Kano
- Feather, Stone & Light (1995, Canyon Records) with William Eaton and Will Clipman
- How the West Was Lost Volume Two (1995, Silver Wave Records) with Peter Kater
- Kokopelli's Cafe (1996, Canyon Records) with The R. Carlos Nakai Quartet
- Improvisations in Concert (1996, Silver Wave Records) with Peter Kater
- Two World Concerto (1997, Canyon Records) with James DeMars
- Inside Canyon de Chelly (1997, Canyon Records) with Paul Horn
- Mythic Dreamer (1998, Canyon Records)
- Red Wind (1998, Canyon Records) with William Eaton and Will Clipman
- Winds of Devotion (1998, EarthSea Records) with Nawang Khechog
  - Rereleased in 2008 on Sounds True
- Inside Monument Valley (1999, Canyon Records) with Paul Horn
- Inner Voices (1999, Canyon Records)
- Big Medicine (1999, Canyon Records) with The R. Carlos Nakai Quartet
- Ancient Future (2000, Canyon Records) with The R. Carlos Nakai Quartet
- In a Distant Place (2000, Canyon Records) with William Eaton, Will Clipman and Nawang Khechog
- Edge of the Century (2001, Canyon Records) with AmoChip Dabney
- Enter >> Tribal (2001, Canyon Records)
- Through Windows & Walls (2001, Silver Wave Records) with Peter Kater
- Fourth World (2002, Canyon Records)
- Sanctuary (2003, Canyon Records)
- In Beauty, We Return (2004, Canyon Records)
- People of Peace (2005, Canyon Records) with The R. Carlos Nakai Quartet
- Our Beloved Land (2005, Canyon Records) with Keola Beamer
- Reconnections (2006, Canyon Records) with Cliff Sarde, William Eaton and Randy Wood
- Voyagers (2007, Canyon Records) with Udi Bar-David
- Talisman (2008, Canyon Records)
- Guadalupe, Our Lady of the Roses (2008, Canyon Records) with James DeMars, Isola Jones, Robert Breault, Carole FitzPatrick and Robert Barefield
- Dancing into Silence (2010, Canyon Records) with William Eaton and Will Clipman
- Awakening the Fire (2013, Canyon Records) with Will Clipman
- Ritual (2014, Mysterium Music) with Peter Kater, Paul McCandless, Jaques Morelenbaum and Trisha Bowden
- What Lies Beyond (2016, Canyon Records)
- Nocturne (2020, Canyon Records)
- In Harmony We Journey: The Best of R. Carlos Nakai: The Second 20 Years (2021, Canyon Records)

== Compilation appearances ==
- Narada Film and Television Music Sampler (1998, Narada/Virgin/EMI)
- The Rough Guide to Native American Music (1999, World Music Network)
