= O.C. Tanner Gift of Music =

The O.C. Tanner Gift of Music is a series of free concerts presented in Salt Lake City by the Utah Symphony and the Tabernacle Choir at Temple Square, with soloists, conductors and other choirs as guests. The concerts have been hosted by the Church of Jesus Christ of Latter-day Saints (LDS Church) on Temple Square since 1983. The thirtieth anniversary gala concerts were held September 6 and 7, 2013.

== Origins ==
In the 1970s two neighbors Obert C. Tanner, founder of the O.C. Tanner company and Gordon B. Hinckley, a member of the First Presidency of the LDS Church, worked together to foster unity in the growing community of the Wasatch Front. They included the president of the Utah Symphony, Wendell Ashton, and the president of the Mormon Tabernacle Choir, Oakley Evans in these efforts. Their intent was to create a series of free concerts funded by an endowment from Obert and his wife Grace. These concerts would feature the combined talents of the world-famous Choir and the Symphony. Adding famed soloists, conductors and other choirs as guest artists would make these world class concerts.

I think beauty gives more joy to more people over a longer period of time than any other human value.

— Obert C. Tanner,

== Gifts Of Music ==
=== 1983–89 ===
==== 1983: Verdi Requiem ====
Friday, September 16, 1983

The Salt Lake Tabernacle

- Mormon Tabernacle Choir
- Utah Symphony --- Stanislaw Skrowaczewski, conductor
- Kristine Ciesinski, soloist
- Katherine Ciesinski, soloist
- Arnold Voketaitis, soloist
- Dana Talley, soloist

==== 1985: Americana ====
- Mormon Tabernacle Choir
- Utah Symphony --- Michael Tilson Thomas, conductor and soloist

==== 1987: Mendelssohn Elijah ====
- Mormon Tabernacle Choir
- Utah Symphony --- Jerold Ottley, conductor
- Audrey Luna, soloist

==== 1989: operatic and concert selections ====
Friday & Saturday, February 24 and 25, 1989

Salt Lake Tabernacle

- Mormon Tabernacle Choir
- Utah Symphony --- Julius Rudel, conductor
- Kiri Te Kanawa, soloist

=== 1991–99 ===
==== 1991: operatic and concert selections ====
Friday and Saturday, November 8 and 9, 1991

Salt Lake Tabernacle

- Mormon Tabernacle Choir
- Utah Symphony --- Joseph Silverstein, conductor
- Frederica von Stade, soloist

==== 1994: Berlioz Requiem ====
Friday and Saturday, April 22 and 23, 1994

Salt Lake Tabernacle

- Mormon Tabernacle Choir
- Utah Symphony --- Robert Shaw, conductor
- Stanford Olsen, soloist

==== 1996: DeMars An American Requiem ====
Friday and Saturday, November 1 and 2, 1996

Salt Lake Tabernacle

- Mormon Tabernacle Choir
- Utah Symphony --- James DeMars, composer & conductor
- Audrey Luna, soloist
- Linda Priebe , soloist
- Robert Breault, soloist
- Simon Estes, soloist

==== 1998: an Atlantic bridge ====
Friday and Saturday, November 13 and 14, 1998

Salt Lake Tabernacle

- Mormon Tabernacle Choir
- Utah Symphony --- Craig Jessop, conductor
- The King's Singers, soloists

==== 1999: Brahms Requiem ====
Saturday, February 13, 1999

Salt Lake Tabernacle

- Mormon Tabernacle Choir
- Utah Symphony --- Craig Jessop, conductor
- Janice Chandler Eteme, soloist
- Nathan Gunn, soloist

=== 2000–09 ===
==== 2000: Vaughan Williams Hodie ====
Friday & Saturday, November 3 and 4, 2000

Salt Lake Tabernacle

- Mormon Tabernacle Choir
- Utah Symphony --- Keith Lockhart, conductor
- Henriette Schellenberg, soloist
- Robert Breault, soloist
- Robert Honeysucker, soloist
- International Children's Choir, guest
- Temple Square Chorale, guest
- SUU Concert Choir, guest

==== 2002: Mahler Symphony no. 8 ====
Friday and Saturday, November 15 and 16, 2002

Salt Lake Tabernacle

- Mormon Tabernacle Choir
- Utah Symphony --- Keith Lockhart, conductor
- Bridgett Hooks, soloist
- Indra Thomas, soloist
- Mary Ellen Callahan, soloist
- Barbara Rearjck, soloist
- Rebekah Ambosini, soloist
- John Daniecki, soloist
- Clayton Brainerd, soloist
- Les Young, soloist
- Utah Symphony Chorus, guest
- Choristers of the Madeleine Choir School, guest
- International Children's Choir, guest
- Salt Lake Children's Choir, guest
- SUU Concert Choir, guest

==== 2005: a Celtic celebration ====
Friday & Saturday, October 21 and 22, 2005

Conference Center

- Mormon Tabernacle Choir
- Utah Symphony --- Craig Jessop & Mack Wilberg, conductors
- Ronan Tynan, soloist
- Leahy, soloist
- Wasatch & District Pipe Band, guests

==== 2008: an American songbook ====
George M. Cohan, Richard Rodgers, John Williams, Woody Guthrie, Irving Berlin and other American composers

Friday & Saturday, September 19 and 20, 2008

Conference Center

- Mormon Tabernacle Choir
- Utah Symphony --- Erich Kunzel, guest conductor
- Denyce Graves, soloist
- Brian Stokes Mitchell, soloist

==== 2009: Mahler Symphony no. 2 ====
Friday and Saturday, November 20 and 21, 2009

Salt Lake Tabernacle

- Mormon Tabernacle Choir
- Utah Symphony --- Keith Lockhart, conductor
- Janice Chandler Eteme, soloist
- Nancy Maultsby, soloist

=== 2011–present ===
==== 2011: Berlioz Requiem ====
Friday & Saturday, September 16 and 17, 2011

Salt Lake Tabernacle

- Mormon Tabernacle Choir
- Utah Symphony --- Thierry Fischer, conductor

==== 2013: 30th anniversary gala ====
Friday & Saturday, September 6 and 7, 2013

Conference Center

- Mormon Tabernacle Choir
- Utah Symphony --- Mack Wilberg, conductor
- James Taylor, Special Guest

==== 2019: Golden Spike 150th Anniversary ====
Friday, May 10th, 2019

- Tabernacle Choir at Temple Square
- Utah Symphony
- Brian Stokes Mitchell, Megan Hilty special guests
