= Stephen C. Clark (bishop) =

American bishop

The Right Reverend Stephen C. Clark
- Bishop of Utah
- Church: Episcopal Church
- Elected: 17 September 1946
- In office: 1946–1950
- Predecessor: Arthur Moulton
- Successor: Richard S. Watson

Orders
- Ordination: 1917
- Consecration: 6 December 1946

Personal details
- Born: August 6, 1892 Pasadena, California, United States
- Died: December 3, 1950 (aged 58)
- Denomination: Anglican
- Parents: Stephen Cutter & Grace Miller Greene
- Spouse: Helen Marcia Moodey
- Children: 2

Stephen Cutter Clark (August 6, 1892 - December 2, 1950) was sixth bishop of the Episcopal Diocese of Utah, serving from 1946 to 1950.

== Biography ==
Following studies at the University of California (B.A. 1914), he was ordained to the diaconate and priesthood in 1917. He was assigned as a minister of St. Luke's Church in Park City, Utah between 1917 and 1918. He became rector of St Paul's Church in Pomona, California in 1918. In 1927 he was appointed rector of St Mark's Church in Pasadena, California, a post he held until his election to the episcopate in an executive session of the House of Bishops on September 17, 1946. Clark was consecrated on December 6, 1946.

== Bibliography ==
- A Brief History of the Diocese of Los Angeles (1945)
