= Paul Jones (bishop) =

20th-century American Episcopal bishop

The Right Reverend Paul Jones
- Bishop of Utah
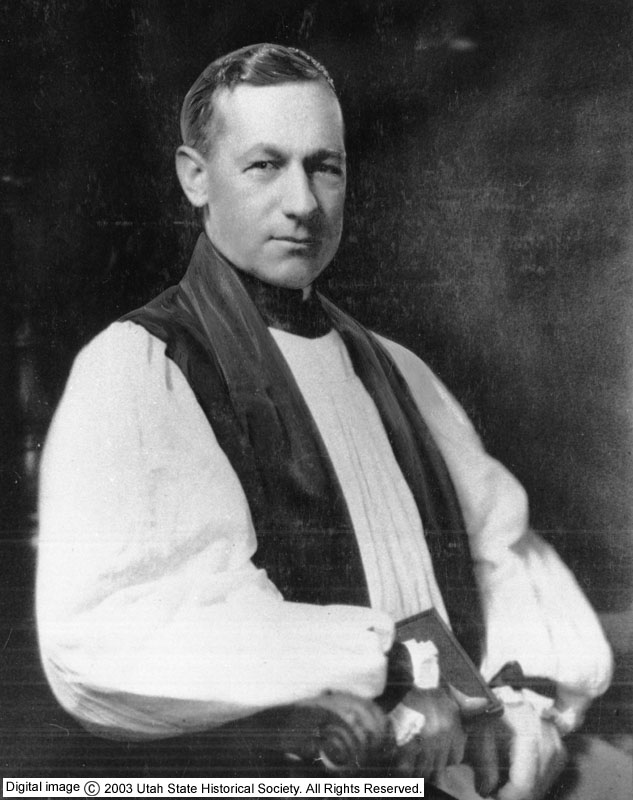
- Church: Episcopal Church
- Diocese: Utah
- In office: 1914–1918
- Predecessor: Franklin Spencer Spalding
- Successor: Arthur Moulton
- Previous post: Archdeacon of the Missionary Diocese of Utah

Orders
- Ordination: 1906 by Franklin Spencer Spalding
- Consecration: 1914 by Daniel S. Tuttle

Personal details
- Born: November 25, 1880 Wilkes-Barre, Pennsylvania, United States
- Died: September 4, 1941 (aged 60) Yellow Springs, Greene County, Ohio, United States

Sainthood
- Feast day: September 4

Paul Jones (25 November 1880 – 4 September 1941) was the Episcopal Bishop of Utah (1916–1918), a socialist, and a prominent pacifist. He is included in the book of Lesser Feasts and Fasts of the Episcopal Church. His feast day is September 4.

== Early life and education ==
Jones was born in Wilkes-Barre, Pennsylvania, to Sarah Eastman Coffin Jones and Henry Lawrence Jones, rector of St. Stephen's parish. Paul Jones attended the local grammar school, then Yale University. During summers he worked near home, once as a strikebreaker, and once learning accounting in a mine company's front office.

After graduating in 1902, Jones traveled to Cambridge, Massachusetts, and attended the Episcopal Divinity School. He learned about social action theology, including works of Frederick D. Maurice. Before Jones graduated in 1906, Utah's rugged Missionary Bishop Franklin Spencer Spalding (like himself a clergyman's son) addressed the students. This prompted Jones to volunteer to serve in that diocese.

After receiving a pay raise, Jones married Mary Balch in Coronado, California in June 1913. They had a daughter and son, Barbara Spalding Jones (b. 1915) and David Balch Jones (b. 1923), both of whom survived him. He would later receive honorary degrees from Wilberforce University (L.L.D in 1934), and Meadville Theological School (D.D. in 1937).

== Ministry ==
Jones accepted a position at the mission church of St. John in Logan, Utah, and also ministered to students at the nearby Utah Agricultural College. He also cleared a farm in the mountains (that was later donated to St. John's Church), as well as traveled to remote parishes in the large missionary district. Bishop Ethelbert Talbot of the Episcopal Diocese of Central Pennsylvania had ordained him a deacon after his graduation, and by year's end, Bishop Spalding had ordained him a priest. His rank increased from associate of the St. John's mission to priest-in-charge in 1911. Jones also served as secretary of the diocesan convocations from 1907 until 1914. Like Bishop Spalding, Jones was a social activist and pacifist, especially after witnessing ill-treatment of miners and railroad workers, as well as discrimination against German immigrants in Salt Lake City.

When Bishop Spalding died unexpectedly after being hit by a car, the diocese chose Jones (whom Bishop Spalding had appointed as archdeacon in 1913) as his successor. On December 16, 1914, Presiding Bishop Daniel S. Tuttle (himself a former Missionary Bishop of Utah who had become bishop of the Episcopal Diocese of Missouri) led the consecration service, joined by California bishops William Ford Nichols, William Hall Moreland and Joseph Horsfall Johnson as well as mostly current or former western missionary bishops Talbot, James Bowen Funsten, Robert L. Paddock, Nathaniel S. Thomas, Benjamin Brewster and Louis Childs Sanford. Bishop Jones' ministry continued to take him to many reservations of Native Americans, as well as among miner and railroad workers. He traveled many miles around the diocese visiting parishes by railroad, stagecoach, motorcar, horse and foot.

In the years preceding World War I, Fort Douglas near Salt Lake City became a detention center for pacifists, a German naval crew, and later German-Americans. The lawyer son of the camp's commander was an active layman in the joint vestry of the two Salt Lake parishes, and also lost a son during military training in 1916. Because of Jones' outspoken opposition to World War I, particularly his declaration that "war is unchristian" in August 1917 which received wide press coverage after police raided pacifists meeting in Los Angeles, California (and a complaint filed from the Salt Lake City parishes), Jones was hauled before a special committee of the House of Bishops in St. Louis, Missouri, by year's end. Although the committee initially recommended he remain in his post, Presiding Bishop Tuttle appointed a second committee that never received certain defense documents (including a survey demonstrating overwhelming support for him outside the two Salt Lake City parishes) and recommended Jones take a leave of absence based on his opposition to government policy. By year's end, Jones resigned his see effective April 11, 1918 (Easter Sunday that year being March 31). The United States formally joined World War I in February 1918. The resigned bishop became a missionary in tiny Brownville Junction, Maine, on a railroad line to New Brunswick, Canada, and near the end of what became the Appalachian Trail. His Utah missionary see lay vacant until the war's end, when Rev. Arthur Moulton, who had served as a combat chaplain and who also espoused socialist ideals and would work for peace following World War II, was chosen Jones' successor.

In 1921, Philadelphia's Quakers invited Jones to address them. Jones helped the Fellowship of Reconciliation become international in 1919, and moved to New York and became its secretary for a decade.

Although in 1929 Jones was chosen as temporary bishop of Southern Ohio while the next incumbent was being selected, he never again held a permanent diocese. In 1933, presiding bishop James DeWolf Perry restored Jones's seat, but not his vote, in the House of Bishops.

In 1929, Jones accepted a position as chaplain and assistant professor of religion at Antioch College in Yellow Springs, Ohio, and while there sometimes referred to himself as "Bishop to the Universe." He also became a director of the National Consumers League and the League for Industrial Democracy. Rt. Rev. Jones continued to advocate for black civil rights, social reform and economic justice. On November 11, 1939 (Armistice Day), he joined bishop William Appleton Lawrence (of the Episcopal Diocese of Western Massachusetts), and New Yorkers Mrs. Henry Hill Pierce and John Nevin Sayre to found the Episcopal Pacifist Fellowship (that in 1966 became the Episcopal Peace Fellowship). Just before his death, Jones helped resettle Jews displaced by the Nazis and advocated a more understanding U.S. relationship with Japan.

In 1940, Jones was the socialist candidate for governor of Ohio (and lost by a significant margin to incumbent Republican John W. Bricker as well as Democrat Martin L. Davey).

== Death and legacy ==
Jones died of multiple myeloma in Yellow Springs, Ohio on September 4, 1941, survived by his wife, daughter and 18-year-old son. A scrapbook of his missionary journeys as well as issues of his Logan parish newsletter and about his trial is now made available online by Utah State University.

In 1957 the Lambeth Conference adopted a statement condemning war as a method of settling international disputes, finding it incompatible with Jesus' teaching and urging extension of the right of conscientious objection. In 1962, the Episcopal Church's House of Bishops passed a resolution recognizing "the validity of the calling of the conscientious objector and the pacifist and the duty of the Church fully to minister to him, and its obligation to see that we live in a society in which the dictates of his conscience are respected.” Since 1994, the liturgical calendar of the Episcopal Church (USA) has remembered Bishop Jones on the anniversary of his death, September 4.
