= Phyllis A. Spiegel =

American Episcopal bishop

The Right Reverend Phyllis A. Spiegel
- 12th Bishop of Utah
- Church: The Episcopal Church of the United States (TEC)
- Province: Province VIII
- Diocese: Diocese of Utah
- Installed: 17 September 2022
- Predecessor: Scott B. Hayashi
- Previous posts: Rector, St. Anne Episcopal Church, West Chester, Ohio, 2015; Priest-in-charge and later rector, St. Thomas Episcopal Church, Christiansburg, VA

Orders
- Ordination: 2004
- Consecration: 17 September 2022 by Katharine Jefferts Schori

Personal details
- Denomination: Anglican
- Children: 1 daughter
- Education: Virginia Theological Seminary M.Div.; Emory & Henry College, B.A.

Phyllis Ann Spiegel is the twelfth bishop of the Episcopal Diocese of Utah.

== Family life and education ==
Spiegel spent her early life in southwestern Virginia as the youngest of three children. She attended Emory & Henry College, graduating with an interdisciplinary B.A. in Business Management, French, and International Studies. She then interned with Southern Empowerment Project, then taught Business and Commerce at a secondary school in Kenya for nine months. She briefly worked for the Girl Scouts before opening a second location of her family's nature store, For the Birds. In 2004, Spiegel graduated with a Master of Divinity from the Virginia Theological Seminary.

== Priestly career ==
She was ordained in the Anglican ministry in 2004. Her first pastoral appointments were as a deacon at St. Thomas Episcopal Church in Christianburg, Virginia. Upon completing her ministerial studies at the Virginia Theological Seminary, Spiegel was ordained a priest and appointed rector of the church. She next served as rector of St. Anne Episcopal Church in West Chester, Ohio from 2015 until her election as Bishop of Utah.

== Episcopal career ==
Spiegel was elected the 12th Bishop of Utah on the first ballot of the special electing convention on 30 April 2022. Her consecration took place at The Capitol Theatre in Salt Lake City on 17 September 2022, with the Episcopal Church's presiding bishop, the Most Reverend Katharine Jefferts Schori, serving as the principal consecrator. Spiegel was formally installed in a special bishop's seating and investiture ceremony at the Cathedral Church of St. Mark in Salt Lake City on 18 September 2022. Spiegel followed Carolyn Tanner Irish (10th bishop) as the second woman to head the Diocese of Utah.

== See also ==
- List of Episcopal bishops of the United States
- Historical list of the Episcopal bishops of the United States
- Episcopal Church in the United States of America

Episcopal Church (USA) titles
Preceded by Scott B. Hayashi	12th Bishop of Utah; 2022 – present	Incumbent
