= Old Hansen Planetarium =

Historic building in Salt Lake City, Utah, U.S.

- Salt Lake City Public Library
- U.S. National Register of Historic Places
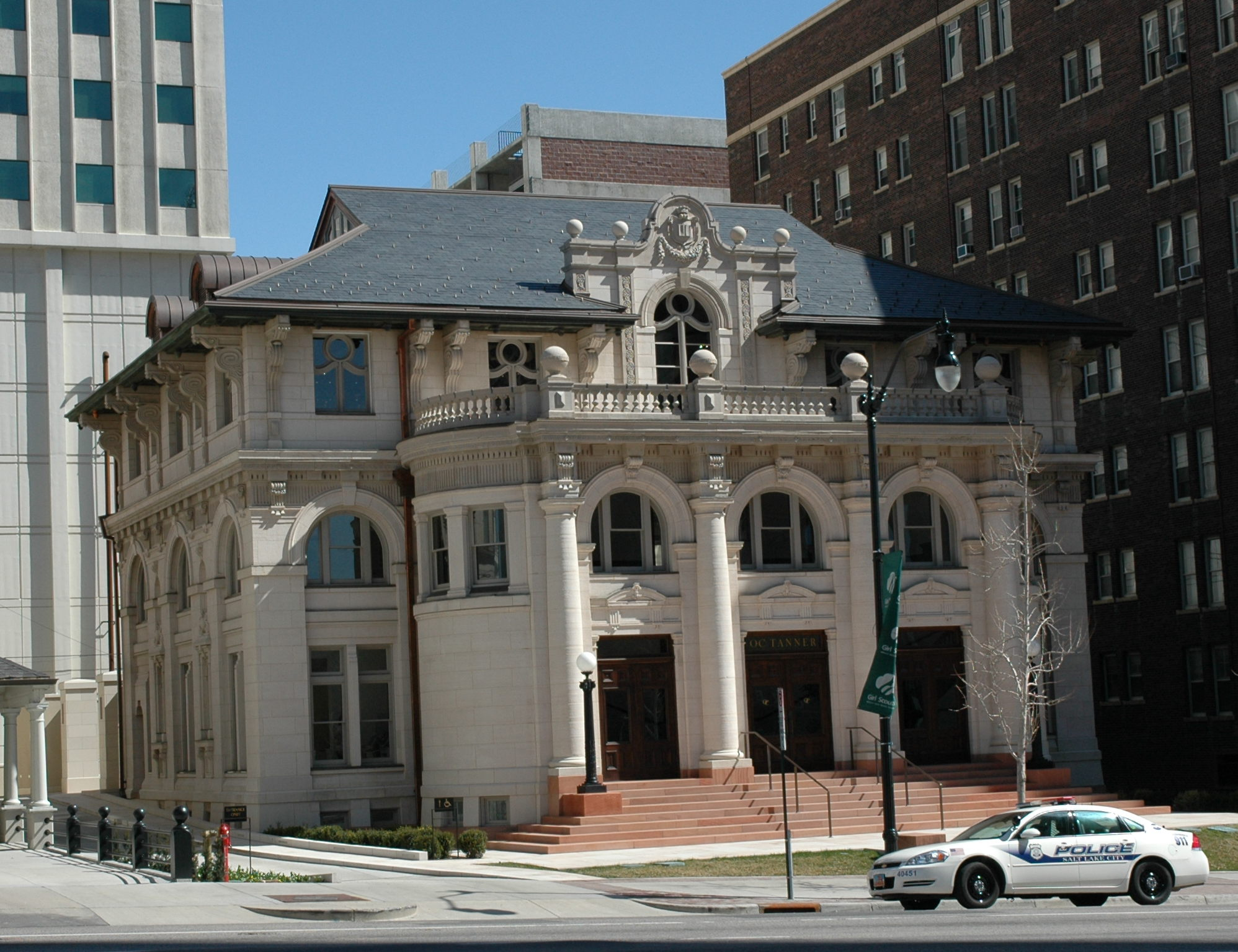
- Old Hansen Planetarium in 2010

- Location within Utah Location within the United States
- Location: 15 S State St, Salt Lake City, Utah
- Coordinates: 40°46′7″N 111°53′13″W
- Built: 1904
- Architect: Hines & Lafarge; Frederick A. Hale
- Architectural style: Beaux Arts
- NRHP reference No.: 79002505
- Added to NRHP: August 7, 1979

The Old Hansen Planetarium is a three-story building located at 15 South State Street in Salt Lake City, Utah. It has served many functions throughout its history. Originally built in 1904 as the Salt Lake City Public Library, the building was renovated in 1965 to become the Hansen Planetarium. After the planetarium closed and was replaced by the Clark Planetarium in 2003, the building was remodeled into the O.C. Tanner Company Flagship jewelry store, which opened in 2009. The building was listed on the National Register of Historic Places in 1979.

== Salt Lake City Public Library ==
The first public library in Salt Lake City opened in 1898 and was located in the top floor of the Salt Lake City and County Building. After the library quickly outgrew the venue, the city began looking for a location to build a new library. A group of women called the Ladies Literary Society helped out by persuading the mining millionaire John Quackenbos Packard to donate land and money for the new building, which cost $100,000 at the time. The new library opened in 1905 with librarian Joanna Sprague, for whom the Sprague branch of the Salt Lake City Public Library system, also listed on the National Register of Historic Places, is now named. The building would continue to serve as the main branch library until October 1964, when a new library building was constructed at 209 East 500 South.

When the building was constructed, it was described as a "combination of the Doric and Ionian styles of architecture", and would later be classified in the Beaux Arts style. It was designed by Heins & LaFarge of New York City, and the local supervising architect was Frederick A. Hale. The library was three stories tall with a two-story entrance pavilion constructed of oolite limestone and 20,000 square feet (1,900 m^{2}) of floor space. The roof was slightly flared, and the roofline was broken by a large carved stone gable with a center arched window and four decorated pilasters. The entrance pavilion's sides were curved around the spiral staircases at both ends of the entrance foyer. The pavilion was divided into three sections by four columns; each bay contained oak double doors leading to the foyer. After going through the foyer, the main reading room is revealed. In the center of the room stood a librarian's desk made of steel and topped by golden oak, the same finish of the interior of the entrance foyer. On the upper floor, the main auditorium contained seating for 350 people.

== Hansen Planetarium ==
After the new library was constructed in 1964, Gail Plummer, professor of speech and drama at the University of Utah and chairman of the Salt Lake City Library board, expressed interest in converting the old library into a planetarium. Plummer had several conversations with Mrs. Beatrice M. Hansen, wife of the late George T. Hansen, in which Mrs. Hansen decided to fund the project. In 1965 she donated $400,000 to the city to build the planetarium in memory of her deceased husband. After Mrs. Hansen's death the building was renamed the Mr. and Mrs. George T. Hansen Planetarium, Space Science Library and Museum in honor of the couple. During its operation, the planetarium attracted 20% of the population of the city and had the highest per capita attendance of any planetarium in the nation. The Hansen Planetarium continued operation until April 2003, when it outgrew the building and was replaced by the Clark Planetarium in The Gateway.

When the Hansen Planetarium occupied the building, the center doors of the entrance pavilion were replaced by a large sheet of glass, and the center part of the steps was replaced with a fountain. A mezzanine was added above the second floor in the entrance pavilion for exhibit in the planetarium. The same firm that did the original millwork for the 1904 building worked on these new additions. The local architect for the additions was Wesley Budd. A large dome was also added onto the rear wall of the building to give the planetarium extra space for its exhibits.

== O. C. Tanner Company ==
After four years of lying vacant, the O. C. Tanner Company bought the building in 2007 for $1.2 million. Before Tanner came along, two referendums to fund the empty building were rejected, but the jeweling company's clear plan got the votes it needed. The company spent two years and $24 million renovating the building, which opened in September 2009. The company itself supplied a majority of the funds ($13–15 million), and the remainder came from the community.

Upon the company's purchase of the building, O.C. Tanner's staff decided to try to mimic the original architecture as closely as possible. Because of this, the dome at the rear of the building was removed. Instead of simply demolishing the dome, however, it was systematically dismantled and donated to the Zion's Gateway to the Stars planetarium in Orderville, Utah. Also, the front staircase was restored to its original condition by removing the fountain in the center, which, coincidentally, was donated by O. C. Tanner himself.

Only three of the four walls—the sides and front—were preserved in Tanner's restoration. Since the back had already been altered by the Hansen Planetarium and there were no original images of that wall from the 1905 building, Curtis Bennett, vice president of the company's retail operations, was allowed a little freedom with that design. The rear wall now consists of glass and stone, both etched with images of the building's history. The rear wall contains the largest laser stone-carving project in the world with 18 panels covering 900 square feet (84 m^{2}) and weighing 44,000 pounds (20,000 kg) in all. The bottom of the rear wall contains repeated images from the library in 1905, the top contains images of a galaxy (signifying the Hansen Planetarium), and the middle contains an image of the founder of the company, O.C. Tanner. The image on the glass is a dot-matrix image, but the stone imaging required a new process developed specifically for this building.

Inside the building, a new limestone spiral staircase was built with a Flora Cascade chandelier hanging in the center of the spiral. The chandelier was designed by Sharon Marston and includes about 4,000 strands of fiber optics, more than 14,000 interwoven shapes made of white polymer and steel, and about 3,000 golden and amber glass leaves. Weighing 243 pounds (110 kg) and extending 26.4 feet (8.0 m) from the ceiling, the chandelier stretches nearly the entire height of the building.
