= O.C. Tanner (company) =

US employee recognition company

- Industry: Employee Recognition
- Founded: 1927; 99 years ago in Salt Lake City, Utah, United States
- Founder: Obert C. Tanner
- Headquarters: Salt Lake City, United States
- Area served: International
- Key people: Scott Sperry, President & CEO
- Number of employees: 1600
- Website: octanner.com

O.C. Tanner Recognition Company is an employee recognition software and custom awards company based in Salt Lake City, Utah. The company maintains offices in Canada, United Kingdom, Singapore, Australia, and India, and is one of the largest manufacturers of corporate awards in the United States. The company made the medals for the 2002, U.S.-hosted Winter Olympics. The company has developed software technology to pair with its existing industrial technology, providing employee experience and recognition software.

== Overview ==
O.C. Tanner has expanded from a manufacturer of custom awards into a provider of software-based employee recognition. The company offers a cloud-based platform, Culture Cloud (SaaS), which includes tools for service awards, performance recognition, and peer-to-peer appreciation. This platform integrates with workplace systems such as Workday, Microsoft Teams, and Slack. Culture Intelligence is the company’s AI engine that identifies trends in organizational culture and recognition behaviors, then provides suggestions for improving team and individual performance.

The company was named the inaugural “Evergreen Company of the Year” by Tugboat Institute and has been named to the Fortune 100 Best Companies to Work For list.

=== O.C. Tanner Institute ===
The O.C. Tanner Institute is a research division of the company that specializes in employee recognition and workplace culture. In addition to custom research projects, the Institute conducts studies on organizational trends in its annually published Global Culture Report and State of Employee Recognition Report.

== History ==
O.C. Tanner was founded by Obert C. Tanner in 1927. The company started off by selling class rings and pins to high school and college graduates.

The industry benefited directly from an addition in the Economic Recovery Tax Act of 1981, which increased the tax deduction on employee recognition awards. The company’s Canadian office opened in 1982. In 2004, O.C. Tanner expanded into the UK by acquiring B2B Initiatives, a London-based firm specializing in management services.

In 2014, O.C. Tanner announced Tanner Labs, a new product research and development arm of the company. The company intended to increase software innovation in the company workforce. Their tag line is "Thrive at work".

In 2017, O.C. Tanner acquired Accumulate Loyalty Services Ltd., a Melbourne-based employee recognition and incentive firm. O.C. Tanner expanded to India with a new office in 2014. In 2018, OC Tanner acquired Kwench, an India-based SaaS recognition platform. The company now serves 180 countries with operations in 15 countries.

Obert Tanner remained actively involved with the company until his death in 1993. His daughter, Carolyn Tanner Irish, remained as chairperson of the board of the company until her death in 2021. Stephen Tanner Irish is currently chair of the board.

=== Olympics ===
For every Olympic Games since the 2000 Summer Olympics in Sydney, Australia, O.C. Tanner has donated gold rings to athletes and support staff for the US Olympic and Paralympic teams.

In preparation for the 2002 Winter Olympics, O.C. Tanner was commissioned by the United States Olympic Committee to create the medals for the winning athletes in each event.

== Retail Operations ==
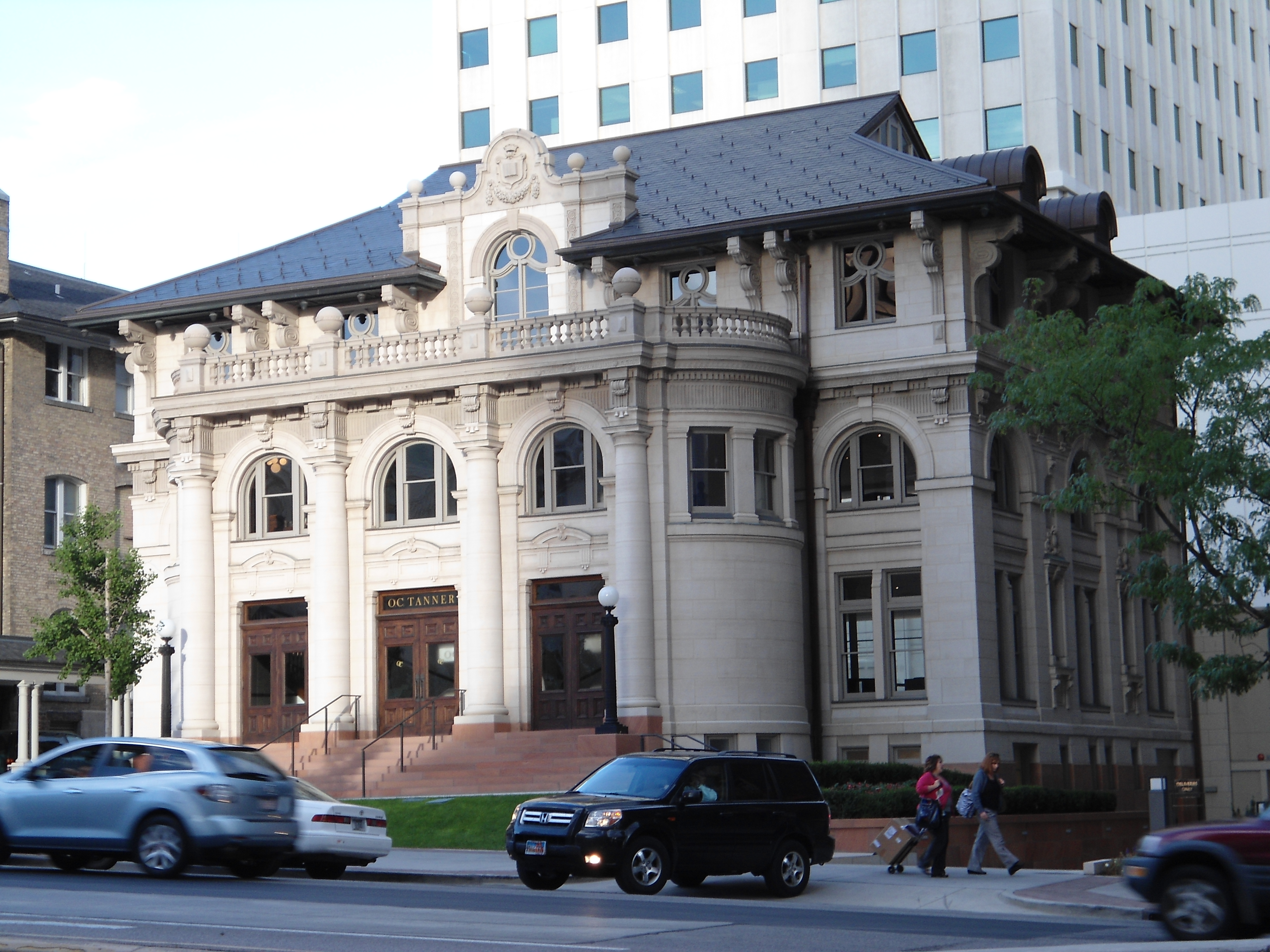
The OC Tanner retail jewelry store in downtown Salt Lake City

In 2003, O.C. Tanner acquired the Hansen Planetarium building. Listed on the National Register of Historic Places in 1979, the building was previously used as the Salt Lake city library until the 1960s, when it was renovated to become Hansen Planetarium. Following the purchase, O.C. Tanner renovated the building to serve as a new company main jewelry store. The new store opened in 2009. O.C. Tanner operates another jewelry retail location in Park City, Utah.

== Philanthropy ==
10% of O.C. Tanner's profits are donated to charitable causes annually.

O.C. Tanner sponsors the O.C. Tanner Gift of Music, a series of free concerts held in conjunction with the Utah Symphony and the Tabernacle Choir at Temple Square, plus various vocal artists. These concerts were initiated by Obert Tanner and Gordon B. Hinckley, future president of the Church of Jesus Christ of Latter-day Saints, in the 1970s as a way to give back to the community.

In May 2019, O.C. Tanner designed a copper spike replica of the original Golden spike ceremonially driven at the joining of the First transcontinental railroad. This was in conjunction with the 150th anniversary celebration of the joining held at Golden Spike National Historical Park. Following the ceremonies, the spike was placed on display in the Utah State Capitol. In 2020, O.C. Tanner was honored by Upwardly Global for championing workplace diversity and inclusion. Upwardly Global is a national nonprofit organization dedicated to the effective integration of skilled immigrants into the U.S. workforce.
