= Jacob Spori =

Swiss educator (1847–1903)

Jacob Spori (March 26, 1847 – September 27, 1903) was the first principal of the Bannock Stake Academy, an institution that would eventually become Brigham Young University–Idaho.

A native of Switzerland, Spori was a high school principal and government officer in that country. He was also elected to the Reformed Church's Synod Council. However, he resigned his seat due to disagreements with the leaders of that church. In 1877, he joined the Church of Jesus Christ of Latter-day Saints (LDS Church). In 1879 he emigrated to Utah Territory. His wife, Magdalena Roschi, and children stayed in Switzerland because they had not joined the LDS Church. In 1884 Spori, returned to Switzerland as a missionary for the LDS Church. He baptized his wife. One week later, he set off to preach in the Ottoman Empire. While there he baptized Mischa Markow. In 1886, he performed the first-ever Latter-day Saint baptism in Palestine.

In 1888, Spori was released from his mission. He went to Switzerland and gathered his family. After arriving in the United States, they settled in Rexburg, Idaho. It was here that Spori served as the first principal of the school that eventually became Ricks College and later Brigham Young University—Idaho. He served in that role for three years.

Spori was a highly educated man who had degrees in mathematics, arts and music, and metallurgy. He was a friend of Karl G. Maeser who instructed him on the desired set up for the new school in Rexburg.

== See also ==
- Joseph M. Tanner

== Notes ==
Academic offices
First	Principal of Bannock Stake Academy (now called Brigham Young University–Idaho); November 12, 1888 – 1891	Succeeded by Charles N. Watkins
