= Rowland Hall =

Independent, private school in Salt Lake City, Utah, U.S.

- Rowland Hall's campus in 2026

Location
- 720 Guardsman Way; 720 Guardsman Way, Salt Lake City, UT 84108; East; Salt Lake City, United States of America, Utah 84108; United States

Information
- Type: Independent, Private
- Motto: Making People The World Needs
- Established: 1867
- Founder: Daniel Sylvester Tuttle
- Principal: Charlotte Larsen (elementary)
- Principal: Tamara Schurdak (Middle school)
- Head of school: Mick Gee
- Grades: 3PreK–12
- Average class size: 15
- Student to teacher ratio: 9:1
- Language: English
- Schedule: 8:15-3:00 Mon-Fri
- Campuses: McCarthey Campus, Steiner Campus
- Mascot: Winged Lions
- Rival: Waterford
- Newspaper: Fine Print
- Website: https://www.rowlandhall.org/

Rowland Hall (formerly Rowland Hall-St. Mark's, RHSM) is an independent private school in Salt Lake City, Utah, founded in 1867 and with about 1,000 students. Rowland Hall is promoted as the oldest school in Utah, and has students from preschool through high school. Originally a religious school affiliated with the Episcopal Church denomination, Rowland Hall became independent in the 1930s.

== History ==
Rowland Hall traces its roots to St. Mark's School, which was founded in Salt Lake City by Episcopal Bishop Daniel Sylvester Tuttle in 1867. In support of newly established public schools in the Utah Territory, St. Mark's School was closed in the early 1890s. However its sister school, Rowland Hall, remained open.

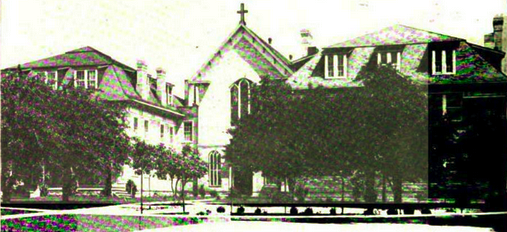
Rowland Hall (1924)

Rowland Hall has operated as a school continuously since St. Marks was founded by Bishop Tuttle in 1867. Rowland Hall opened in 1880 as a boarding school for girls from ranches in neighboring states; the school opened on the First Avenue campus in Salt Lake City. The historic building was originally a home built by George D. Watt in about 1862. Rowland Hall is the oldest school in continuous operation in Utah, predating the establishment of public schools in the Utah territory. During the Great Depression of the 1930s, when the Episcopal Diocese of Utah could no longer afford to support the school, graduates and parents assumed financial responsibility and reorganized Rowland Hall as an independent school.

A photo of St. Marks Grammar school in the decades shortly after it was open

In 1956, St. Mark's re-opened as an independent day school for boys in two historic houses and a so-called tin shed that were located next door to Rowland Hall, sharing the same city block. St. Mark's merged with Rowland Hall in 1964 to become Rowland Hall-St. Mark's, an independent coeducational school.

The Middle and Upper Schools moved to the Lincoln Street Campus in 1984. The Lower and Beginning Schools moved to the McCarthey Campus on Guardsman Way in 2002. The historic campus on First Avenue was sold to the Madeleine Choir School. In 2024, construction began on the Steiner Campus on Sunnyside Avenue, which has united the school on one campus.

== Academics ==
Rowland Hall serves students from Pre-K through 12th grade across four divisions:

- Beginning School: Pre-kindergarten through kindergarten
- Lower School: Grades 1 through 5
- Middle School: Grades 6 through 8
- Upper School: Grades 9 through 12

In the Upper School, Rowland Hall offers Advanced Placement courses with an Advanced Research program. The school also includes outdoor education into its curriculum across all divisions.

=== Extracurriculars and arts ===
Students across divisions participate in arts and extracurricular programs, including to but not limited to Chamber Ensemble and Ceramics. The school also has a competitive speech and debate team, which has won Utah High School Activities Association 3A state championships.

== Campus ==
Rowland Hall is currently housed on one campus in Salt Lake City. The Beginning School, Lower School, Middle School, and Upper School are all on the Steiner campus at 1481 Sunnyside Ave S, Salt Lake City.

The old Lincoln campus for Rowland Hall

The Steiner campus in Salt Lake City is a new campus having just been opened on December 1st 2026. The Steiner campus has many new features including a indoor running track, a collaboration hub for each grade, an outdoor eating space, and a new field. The former campus (Lincoln street campus) located near 9th and 9th is just over a mile away, and was used from 1984 to 2026.

== Sports ==
The Rowmark Ski Academy was founded in 1982 as part of Rowland Hall's Upper School. It offers a combination of academics and complete year-round competitive ski racing program for its student-athletes, who train at Utah Olympic Park. Nineteen Rowmark athletes have been named to the U.S. Ski Team including Picabo Street, Breezy Johnson, Hilary Lindh, Alice McKennis, Andy Phillips, Erik Fisher, Keely Kelleher and Robert Saunders.

Rowland Hall offers 16 sports in the Upper School and six sports in the Middle School. Rowland Hall’s Upper School is classified as a Division 2A school in Region 17 of the Utah High School Activities Association (UHSAA) with some sports competing in 3A. Middle School student-athletes compete in the Wasatch Athletic Conference.

== Notable people ==
=== Alumni ===
- James Bauer '86, astronomer
- Maggie Behle '99, para-alpine skier
- Nancy Borgenicht '60, actress
- Katharine Coles '77, poet and educator
- Ovidio García '86, alpine skier
- Caroline Gleich '03, skier, mountaineer, environmental activist, United States Senate candidate
- Breezy Johnson '13, alpine skier
- Keely Kelleher '03, alpine skier
- Levi Leipheimer '92, cyclist
- Hilary Lindh '87, alpine skier
- Missy Marlowe '89, gymnast
- Gota Miura '88, freestyle skier
- Chirine Njeim '03, alpine skier and long-distance runner
- Matthew Prince '92, business executive, co-founder and CEO of Cloudflare
- Picabo Street, alpine skier
- Kristi Terzian '85, alpine skier
- Katie Vesterstein '17, alpine skier
- Alex Wubbels '94, nurse and former Olympian

=== Faculty ===
- E. Otis Charles, 8th Bishop of Utah
- Daniel S. Tuttle, 13th Presiding Bishop of the Episcopal Church
