= Joseph M. Tanner =

American educator and leader in the Church of Jesus Christ of Latter-day Saints

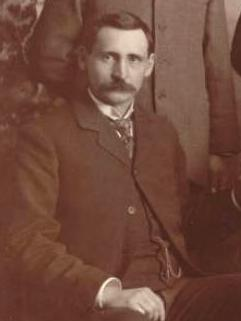
Tanner, ca. 1895

Joseph Marion "Jay" Tanner (March 26, 1859 – August 19, 1927) was an American educator and a leader in the Church of Jesus Christ of Latter-day Saints (LDS Church). He has been described as "one of the most gifted teachers and writers in the [LDS] Church in the late nineteenth and early twentieth centuries".

Tanner was born in Payson, Utah Territory, in a Latter-day Saint family. He attended Brigham Young Academy in Provo, Utah before departing the United States as a missionary for the LDS Church. From 1884 to 1887, he preached Mormonism in Europe and the Middle East. Along with Jacob Spori, he was the first LDS Church missionary to preach in the Ottoman Empire—where they baptized Mischa Markow—and was the organizer of the first branch of the LDS Church in Palestine.

From 1887 to 1891, Tanner was the principal of Brigham Young College in Logan, Utah. In 1891, he became the leader of the first group of Latter-day Saints to enroll at Harvard University. Tanner studied law at Harvard Law School until 1894, when his ill health prompted him to return to Utah.

From 1896 to 1900, Tanner was president of Utah Agricultural College, which is today Utah State University.

In 1901, Tanner succeeded Karl G. Maeser and became the second Commissioner of Church Education for the LDS Church. At the same time, he became the second assistant to Lorenzo Snow in the general superintendency of the church's Deseret Sunday School Union. When Snow died and was succeeded by Joseph F. Smith, Tanner became Smith's second assistant in the church's Sunday School.

Tanner retired in 1906 and emigrated to Alberta, Canada, where he farmed in the Cardston area.

From 1906 to 1921 Tanner wrote extensively for the Improvement Era, an official periodical of the LDS Church. He wrote a number of books, including manuals for the church's Sunday School and a biography of John R. Murdock.

Tanner was a practitioner of plural marriage and had six wives. His second wife, Annie Clark Tanner, reported his abandoning her and their children.

Tanner died in Lethbridge, Alberta, and was buried in Salt Lake City, Utah.

== See also ==
- O. C. Tanner

== Notes ==
Preceded by Joshua H. Paul	President of Utah State University; 1896-1900	Succeeded by William J. Kerr
