= Mischa Markow =

Mischa Markow (21 October 1854 – 19 January 1934) was the first missionary for the Church of Jesus Christ of Latter-day Saints (LDS Church) to preach in present-day Romania, Serbia, Croatia, Latvia and Belgium. He also served as a missionary in Hungary, Germany, and Russia. A Hungarian citizen, Markow joined the LDS Church in Constantinople in the Ottoman Empire after hearing Mormonism taught by Jacob Spori and Joseph M. Tanner. Markow was born at Czernyn, Torontál County, Hungary. Although he was a Hungarian citizen, his father was Serbian and his mother Romanian. Markow first met missionaries of the LDS Church in Alexandria, Egypt. This, however, was on a ship leaving Alexandria. He was baptized on February 1, 1887, in Constantinople, by Jacob Spori. In 1888, Markow headed towards the United States and stopped in Belgium, where he taught and baptized the Esselmann family on the way. Markow arrived in Utah Territory in 1892. The next year, he married Nettie Hansen in the Salt Lake Temple. They had two children. From 1899 to 1901, Markow served as a missionary in Hungary, Serbia, Romania, Bulgaria and Germany. In 1903, Markow returned to Europe as a missionary. He was sent by European Mission President Francis M. Lyman to the Russian Empire. He preached to German families in Riga but when he was called to account before the authorities, he followed Lyman's instructions to avoid being sent to Siberia and fled the country instead. For the next two years, Markow served in the Turkish Mission. After returning to Salt Lake City, Markow worked as a barber. He died on January 19, 1934.
