= Annie Clark Tanner =

American mormon author

Annie Clark Tanner was born on September 24, 1864, in Farmington, Utah and died in 1941. She was a member of The Church of Jesus Christ of Latter-day Saints, a plural wife, a mother, and an author. Tanner was an author of A Mormon Mother, an autobiography that explains her decision to engage in polygamy and her development from that experience.

== Polygamy in Utah and the "underground" ==
The practice of polygamy was first instituted secretly in the early 1840s by early members of The Church of Jesus Christ of Latter-Day Saints. It was not publicly practiced until 1852 when it was announced over the pulpit. This led to a backlash from the United States Federal government with several pieces of legislation designed to target polygamy. Among these were the Edmunds Anti-Polygamy Act of 1882 and the Edmunds-Tucker Act of 1887. Both laws followed the Morrill Anti-Bigamy Act of 1862, which first made polygamy illegal. Each piece of legislation progressively increased the federal government's ability to prosecute polygamists by targeting cohabitation and the seizure of church property.

As a result of these laws, it allowed federal marshals and their deputies to arrest polygamists. They would knock on doors late at night or interrupt church meetings looking for husbands engaged in polygamy. This disrupted the family and community lives of many people in Utah. It also forced many polygamists and their plural wives into hiding to avoid arrest or testify against their husbands in court. Mormons described this experience as hiding in the “underground” which may have been a reference to the underground railroad used during slavery in America. If men were caught, or if women refused to testify in court, then they could be sent to prison. Many prominent Mormon leaders were also forced into the underground and escaped from the main cities in addition to several families. They flocked to Mexico and Canada in large groups to escape prosecution. Polygamy was also not favored in Canada, so typically one family was sent there while others moved to other locations.

The underground also impacted the lives of children in polygamous families. Little children often had to hide with their mothers and were taught to lie to prevent their fathers from getting arrested. Often an innocent answer would send a father to prison, and children would have to bear feelings of guilt throughout their lives. Many children also could not recognize their fathers and grew up lacking a sense of identity in family and community.

Polygamy posed many challenges for the Mormon community, but they persisted out of faith in their religion. It enabled them to overlook domestic issues despite the sources of contention deriving from jealousy and financial problems. Resources in families often were divided unevenly in favor of the first wife. Everyday problems such as disciplining children, visits from husbands, plural wife interactions, family finances, and housing arrangements were not set in place. No polygamous family looked identical because they adapted according to their individual needs. Their religious beliefs allowed them to accept polygamy but did not determine a set pattern of living.

== Early life and education ==
Annie Clark Tanner grew up in a polygamous household as the daughter of a second wife. This gave her first-hand experience and insight into the difficulties that sometimes occurred between plural wives. Her father often gave special consideration to his first wife, and Annie's mother disliked the unequal distribution of attention. On trips, the second wife would often sit in the back seat, and the first wife would never let Annie's father go anywhere without her. Despite these tensions, none of the mothers said anything harsh about the other.

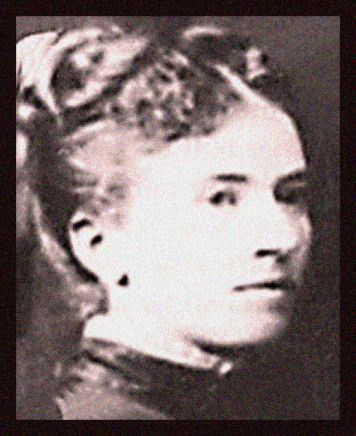
Young Annie Clark Tanner

As a young girl, she experienced the Mormon Reformation which was a time of spiritual revival. The Reformation's purpose was to live “more perfectly in their religion”. Annie remembered when Church members raised their right hands and promised not to trade with outsiders or indulge in tea, coffee, or tobacco. The punishment for failing to maintain these high morals was a public acknowledgment of their sin and asking for forgiveness from the congregation. Many members were also rebaptized including Annie though she had been baptized a year before.

Annie was taken out of school to assist her mother and given many adult responsibilities such as helping to raise her younger siblings. Children learned to work early in life and Annie could mix bread around age nine. At age thirteen, she and her sister were put in charge of the washing. There was little time for play in her home as Annie was the oldest of eight children.

Annie was also interested in learning and would go off with a book in her free time. Later in life, she read religious and faith-promoting books published by the church and also drawn to poetry. Religion was one of the most important things in the world to Annie though she never received any direct teachings from her parents.

Annie decided to further her education and registered at the University of Utah. Later she attended Brigham Young Academy to primarily focus on studying religion. One of her teachers, Karl G. Maeser, remarked that Annie was the most brilliant in her class. There she also met her future husband, Joseph Marion Tanner, another faculty member at Brigham Young University. Mr. Tanner seemed interested in Annie, and she decided to consult President Maeser. Although President Maeser did not want Mr. Tanner to express attention toward students, he told Annie that she should depend on her impressions to guide her decisions.

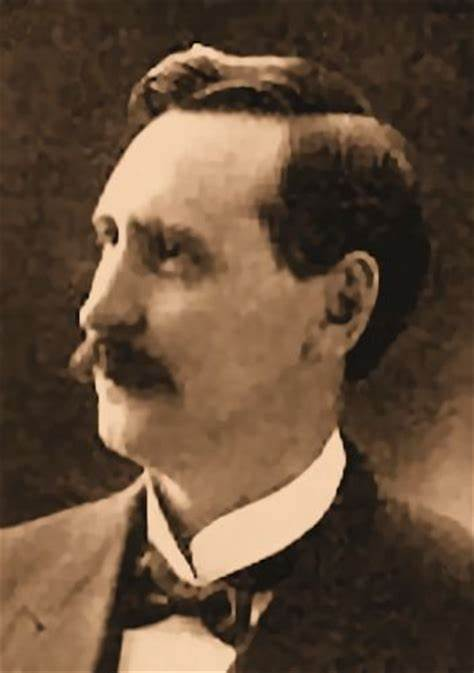
Joseph Marion Tanner

== Marriage ==
When Annie returned home for the school year, she began a correspondence with Mr. Tanner. He requested that their letters go through his wife, Jennie, as he felt it would be more proper. Annie felt this would fail in a potentially polygamous marriage so she did not write. When Mr. and Mrs. Tanner came to visit, Annie refused to take a walk with Mr. Tanner since Jennie was her guest. She and Jennie went on a buggy ride the next morning and talked about polygamy. Annie told Jennie that the affair would end without her prior approval. Even though Jennie felt an aversion to polygamy, she said she would choose Annie as a second wife. Jennie and Marion had been married five years without children, and Jennie did not want to prevent her husband from having a family.

After the visit, Mr. Tanner came only a few more times since he felt a long courtship was improper for polygamous marriages. They later met on the appointed date in Salt Lake and were married on December 27, 1883. After the ceremony, Annie was taken to the train station by Mr. and Mrs. Tanner before they proceeded to Ogden. Annie did not recall any conversation while on the train.

Her brother met her at the train station and her sister gave her an upbeat greeting when she arrived home. The family had already finished their evening meal, so Annie had a glass of milk and bread alone. The thought, “Well, this is my wedding supper” came to her and she thought of the elaborate celebrations others in her family had had. Even though she felt sad that no one would ever congratulate her, she was sure she had taken the right step. The experience had not seemed too terrible yet but was disappointed two weeks later when her husband failed to make his appointment. Annie felt as if the “very angels wept” with her. After this, she steeled herself against disappointment and could never be sure if Mr. Tanner would visit.

Annie continued to teach school and kept her marriage a secret. She, like other women on the underground, had to rely on their skills to get by. The underground experience differed between situations, but there was always consistent stress for everyone.

Annie lived with a lot of uncertainty during her time on the underground. She had to live under an assumed name when she became pregnant and was forced to live away from her family. Annie constantly moved around for six years on the underground without a home. During this time, she lived with the persistent fear that someone would persecute her if they saw her with her child. Annie also gave birth to her second child alone because she could not get help while hiding out.

Her marriage began with the underground and her perception of marriage changed over time. Even though she felt she had to obey her husband, she disagreed with him on many topics such as how to raise their children. Annie sometimes described her husband as a “dictator” who expected her to submit to his will. She did not always agree with his views like when Mr. Tanner declared he did not intend to educate all of his children. He later gave up his financial obligations to her and stated he was not visiting again. Annie then raised and educated her seven children by herself. She began to define her success through personal achievements rather than that of her husband.

== Legacy ==
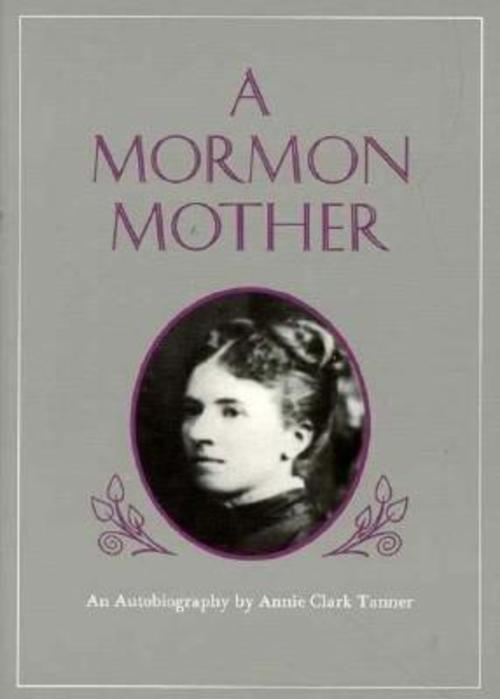
A Mormon Mother written by Annie Clark Tanner

Since the founding of the Church of Jesus Christ of Latter-day Saints in 1830, many Latter-day Saint women have felt obligated on many occasions to justify their religious beliefs. In this case, late-nineteenth-century or early-twentieth-century Mormon women such as Annie Clark Tanner have written of the doctrine and history of polygamy and their explanations for their decisions to participate in plural marriage.

In the last year of her life, Annie Clark Tanner finished writing her autobiography: A Mormon Mother. The memoir was intended for her descendants because she felt they may have had trouble understanding her polygamous marriage and family life. In 1969, scholar Dale Morgan praised Annie's memoir which encouraged more copies to be produced outside the Tanner family and universities. The most recent edition was published in 2006 and included a preface written by her son Obert C. Tanner who praised his mother for overcoming the challenges of the tragic life she lived. He was the youngest of her ten children and said that his mother instilled in him a respect for the value of human freedom and intellectual pursuits. Tanner also wrote other books, such as a biography on her father, Ezra T. Clark, and Sketch of the Life of Susan Leggett Clark, a book about her mother. These biographies provided information on Latter-day Saint church history and leave a legacy for her parents.

In the book, A Mormon Mother, Annie is critical of her husband and polygamy in general. But she also tells the story in a way to prevent readers from casting simple judgments about polygamy or her choice to enter the practice. Annie's narrative is one of few in Mormon literature that has gained fame. Her writing is known for its lucid and forthright female perspective on polygamy. Her book would become a landmark in the writing of Mormon women.
