= Clark Planetarium =

Planetarium in Salt Lake City, Utah, United States

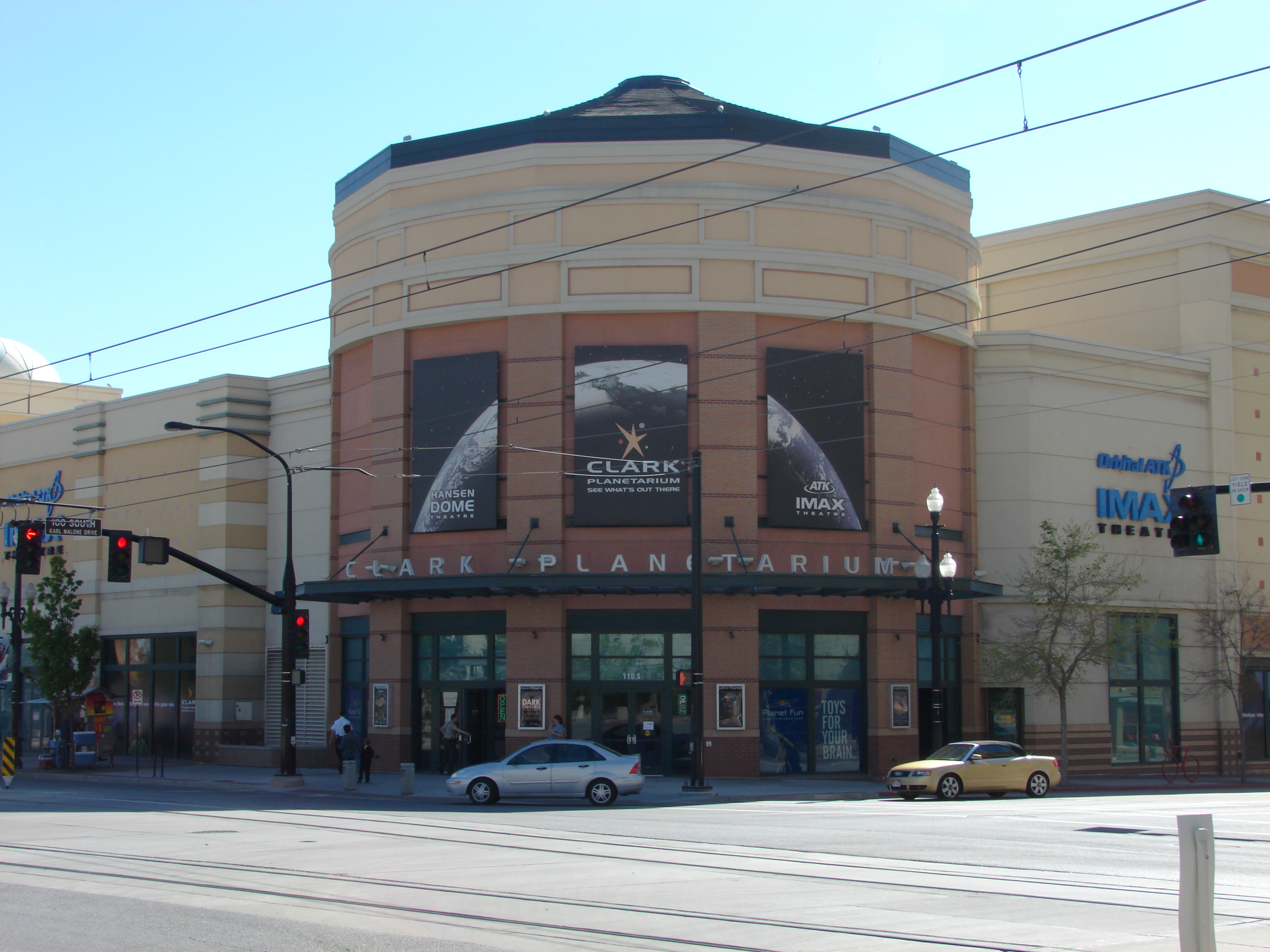
- Front entrance
- Former name: Hansen Planetarium
- Established: 1965, 2003
- Location: 110 S 400 W Salt Lake City, Utah 84101
- Coordinates: 40°46′03″N 111°54′11″W
- Type: Planetarium
- Director: Duke Johnson, MS
- Owner: Salt Lake County
- Public transit access: Planetarium station
- Website: saltlakecounty.gov/clark-planetarium

The Clark Planetarium is a planetarium and science museum situated within The Gateway at the intersection of 400 West and 100 South in downtown Salt Lake City, Utah, United States. The Clark Planetarium opened in April 2003, replacing the historic Hansen Planetarium under a grant from the Clark Foundation in cooperation with Salt Lake County.

== History ==
The original Hansen Planetarium opened in 1965 and remained open through 2002. The Clark replaced it in 2003 with a new operating and budget structure. The planetarium underwent updates and expansion in 2015-2016 and 2023-2024, during which their well-known moon rock, on loan from NASA since 1975, was secured off site.

== Building ==
Light display

The planetarium is home to the Hansen Dome Theater, a 55-foot (16.8 m) perforated aluminum dome, and an IMAX certified big screen theater. The Clark Planetarium features 10,000 square feet (930 m^{2}) of free exhibits including "Science on a Sphere," a computer animation globe by NOAA, "Newton's Daydream", the most ambitious audio-kinetic sculpture ever created by artist George Rhoads.

== See also ==
- Old Hansen Planetarium
