= Sharon Marston =

British designer

Sharon Marston (born 1970) is a British designer who produces light installations and chandeliers.

Works include lighting installations for Marina Bay Sands Casino, OC Tanner Flagship Store, House of Fraser and chandeliers featured in the 2012 film Mirror Mirror, 'Designing 007 – Fifty Years of Bond Style' a Barbican touring exhibition 2012/13, and the V&A's 'Brilliant' exhibition' 2004, where Marston's commissioned piece was amongst the first contemporary lighting to be exhibited at the Victoria & Albert Museum.

== Biography ==
Born in Hereford, Sharon Marston studied jewellery at Middlesex University and went on to design for fashion, theatre and dance for companies such as Bella Freud, Michiko Koshino, Paul Smith and The English National Opera.

Marston established her London-based studio in 1997 and working to an architectural scale, specialises in the design and creation of exclusive light installations and chandeliers using fibre optic technology.

Marston's designs "fuse materials sampled from a range of industries and craft disciplines crossing boundaries between art, fashion, product design and combining traditional processes and techniques with contemporary design".

== Collections ==
- V&A, London

== Exhibitions ==
- Design Resolutions - Royal Festival Hall, (1998)
- Home Sweet Home – British Council, Lesley Jackson (2001)
- Jaeger Flagship Store window display (2003 & 2004)
- Brilliant, V&A, Jane Pavitt, 2004
- Daks Flagship Store window display (2004)
- Aquascutum Flagship Store window display (2005)
- Collect, V&A (2005)
