= Charles N. Watkins =

Charles Nephi Watkins (1855–1896) was the second principal of Bannock Academy, the institution that is today Brigham Young University–Idaho.

Watkins was born in England. As a child, his family moved to New York City and St. Louis, Missouri. His father died in St. Louis; after his mother remarried, the family moved to Bear Lake County, Idaho, in the early 1870s. In 1884, Watkins married Emily Horsley in the Logan Utah Temple. He served as principal of Bannock Academy from 1891 to 1894 and remained a teacher there until his death.

== Sources ==
- BYU-Idaho bio of Watkins

Academic offices
Preceded by Jacob Spori	Principal of Bannock Stake Academy (now called Brigham Young University–Idaho); 1891 – 1894	Succeeded by George Cole
