= George E. Bates (bishop) =

The Right Reverend George Edmond Bates
- Bishop of Utah
- Church: Episcopal Church
- Diocese: Utah
- In office: 1986–1996
- Predecessor: E. Otis Charles
- Successor: Carolyn Tanner Irish

Orders
- Ordination: 1959
- Consecration: 25 October 1986

Personal details
- Born: August 11, 1933 Binghamton, New York, United States
- Died: March 30, 1999 (aged 65) Medford, Oregon, United States
- Spouse: Sue Bates
- Children: 2

George Edmond Bates (11 August 1933 – 30 March 1999) was bishop of the Episcopal Diocese of Utah from 1986 to 1996.

== Biography ==
He was born in Binghamton, New York on August 11, 1933. He received his bachelor's degree from Dartmouth College and his Master of Divinity degree from the Episcopal Theological School in Cambridge, Massachusetts. He was ordained to the diaconate in June 1958 and to the priesthood in 1959. In 1986 he was elected as the ninth bishop of Utah and was consecrated on October 25. He retired his post in June 1996 and was succeeded by the Rt. Rev. Carolyn Tanner Irish.

Bates died of cancer on March 30, 1999, in Medford, Oregon.
