= Obert C. Tanner =

American businessman

O.C. Tanner
- Born: September 20, 1904; Farmington, Utah, US
- Died: October 14, 1993 (aged 89); Palm Springs, California, US
- Resting place: Farmington City Cemetery, Farmington, Utah
- Education: University of Utah; Stanford University
- Occupations: Founder, O.C. Tanner Co.
- Spouse: Grace

Obert Clark Tanner (September 20, 1904 – October 14, 1993) was a University of Utah professor of philosophy, philanthropist, and founder of O.C. Tanner Co.

== Early life and education ==
Tanner was born in Farmington, Utah to Joseph Marion Tanner and Annie Vilate Clark. His mother Annie was his father's second (polygamous) wife, and they spent their wedding night apart because of the Federal government opposition to polygamy. O.C. Tanner was the youngest of Annie's 10 children, and he would later publish her memoirs as A Mormon Mother: An Autobiography by Annie Clark Tanner. It details how his father, exiled to Canada because of his practice of polygamy, was a fading presence in the life of his son.

Annie struggled to survive financially, and O.C. felt a responsibility to contribute financially from an early age, doing odd jobs that included stoking furnaces at the university to pay his tuition. One of the persons whose fires he maintained showed him how to enter the jewelry business, and he started selling seminary graduation pins and class rings from the back of his car. He founded the O.C. Tanner Co. in 1927, while he was still an undergraduate —— a company that is now one of the largest manufacturers of retail and corporate awards in the U.S. He married Grace Adams in 1931.

He completed his B. A. degree in 1929 at the University of Utah, his L.L.B., also from the University of Utah in 1936, his M.A. from Stanford University in 1937, and his J.D. degree from the University of Utah in 1967. He received numerous honorary degrees from Utah universities and colleges. The family foundation endowed the University of Utah Obert C. and Grace A. Tanner Humanities Center.

Tanner took an interest in Mormon studies and once offered Fawn Brodie, famous for her psycho-biography of Joseph Smith, $10,000 for a similar biography of Brigham Young.

== Professional career, awards and philanthropy ==
In 1927 he founded O.C. Tanner Co. by selling class rings and pins to graduates. A company that specializes in employee recognition and compensation services, they have offices in the US, Canada, and the UK.

Before his appointment as professor of philosophy, he was an instructor in Religious Studies at Stanford University from 1939 to 1944. He was the author or co-author of 10 books, including New Testament Studies, The New Testament Speaks, Christ’s Ideals for Living, and co-author of Toward Understanding the New Testament. His autobiography One Man's Journey: In Search of Freedom, discusses his views about his commitment to learning and freedom.

Tanner was a recipient of the National Medal of Arts and an honorary fellow of the British Academy, Oxford University, and Cambridge University. In 1978, he permanently endowed the Tanner Lectures on Human Values, which are presented annually at several universities in England and the United States. He enjoyed donating fountains, often to universities and hospitals, which can be found at the University of Utah, Stanford University, Westminster College, Primary Children's Hospital, among others.

Tanner contributed enormously to Utah's cultural community, chairing the commission that planned the construction of Abravanel Hall, the Utah Art Center, and the restoration of the Salt Lake Capitol Theatre. He also served on the Utah American Revolution Bicentennial Commission, the Utah Symphony Board, and the White House Conference on Children and Youth.

Tanner collaborated with his friend Gordon B. Hinckley to create and endow the O.C. Tanner Gift of Music concert series which began in 1983 and continues. These free concerts, combining the world class talents of the Utah Symphony and the Mormon Tabernacle Choir, build unity and enhance the arts in the Wasatch Front communities of Utah.

Art – beauty should be an everyday experience of all people...beauty is found in music.

— Obert C. Tanner,

Tanner was also an honorary fellow of Linacre College, at the University of Oxford, UK. Due to the generosity of both Tanner and his daughter, the Rt Rev'd Carolyn Tanner Irish, Linacre College have named a number of buildings, rooms (and a fountain) in their honour. These include, the O. C. Tanner Building, Tanner House (which was donated to the College by Carolyn), Tanner Room, The Carolyn Tanner Irish Room, and Tanner Fountain.

== Personal ==
He died in Palm Springs, California; and was buried at the Farmington City Cemetery.

His daughter, the Rt Rev'd Carolyn Tanner Irish, converted to Anglicanism and was the 10th Bishop of the Episcopal Diocese of Utah. Although she was baptized and raised a member of The Church of Jesus Christ of Latter-day Saints (LDS), Carolyn's Mormon baptism was recognised by The Episcopal Church, and in 1983 she was ordained as a Deacon, and then a Priest.

== Sources ==
- Google Finance article on O. C. Tanner Co.
- Tanner biography on Signature Books Web site
