= St. Mark's Cathedral (Salt Lake City) =

Church in Salt Lake City, Utah, U.S.

St. Mark’s Cathedral
- The Cathedral Church of Saint Mark
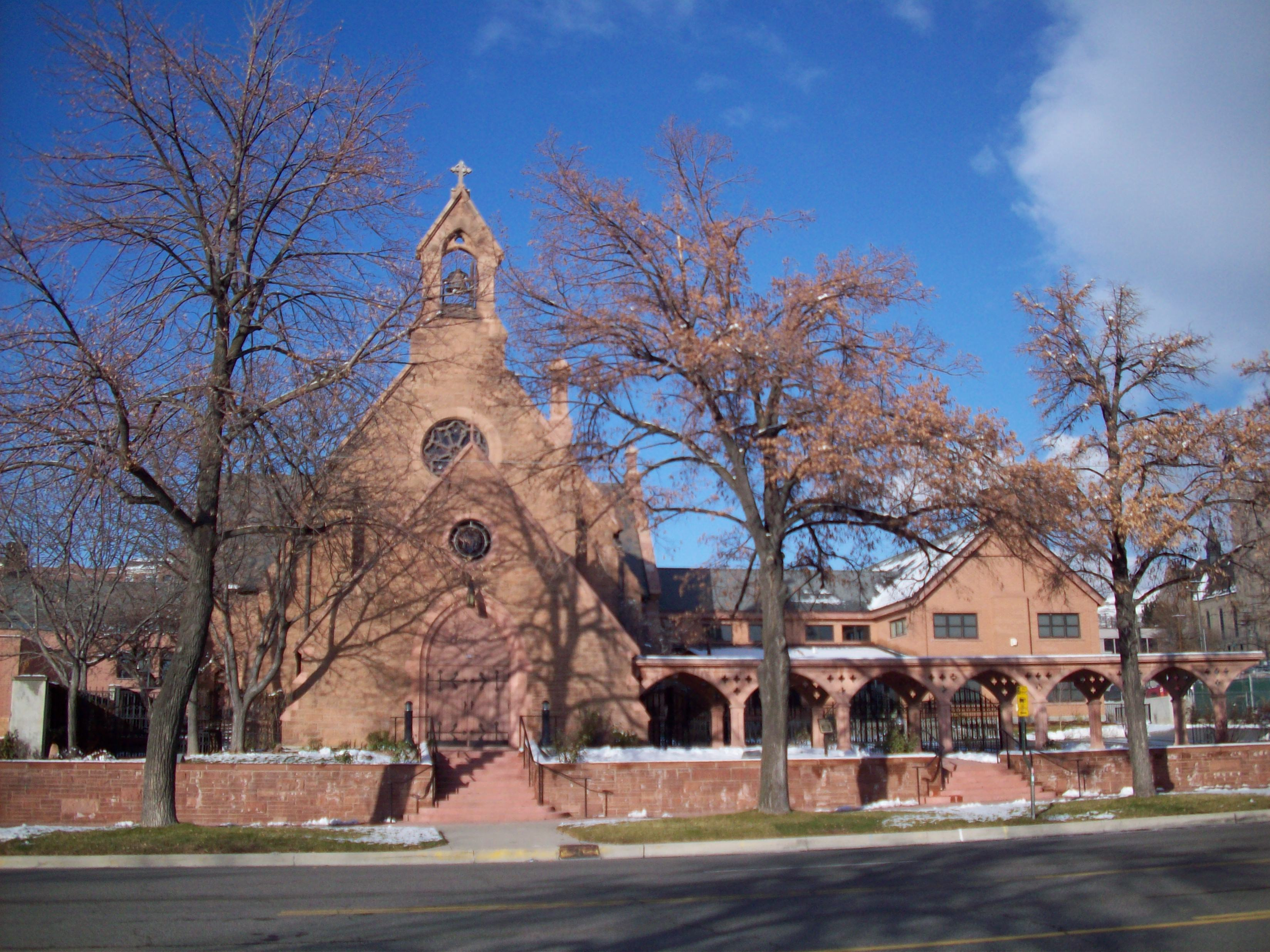
- St. Mark’s Cathedral
- Location: 231 E. 100 South, Salt Lake City, UT, 84111
- Country: United States
- Denomination: Episcopal
- Website: stmarksutah.org

History
- Status: Cathedral
- Founder: Daniel S. Tuttle
- Dedication: St. Mark the Evangelist
- Consecrated: 14 May 1874

Architecture
- Functional status: Active
- Architect: Richard Upjohn
- Style: Gothic Revival
- Groundbreaking: 30 July 1870
- Completed: 1903

Administration
- Province: Pacific
- Diocese: Utah

Clergy
- Bishop: Rt. Rev. Phyllis A. Spiegel
- Dean: (vacant)
- St. Mark's Episcopal Cathedral
- U.S. National Register of Historic Places
- Location within Utah Location within the United States
- Coordinates: 40°46′3.5″N 111°53′3.75″W
- Built: 1870
- NRHP reference No.: 70000630
- Added to NRHP: September 22, 1970

The Cathedral Church of Saint Mark, commonly known as St. Mark's Cathedral, is the cathedral church of the Episcopal Diocese of Utah. It is located on 100 South in downtown Salt Lake City, Utah. Built between 1870 and 1903, it is the third oldest Episcopal cathedral in the United States, the oldest extant non-Mormon church in Utah, and the second oldest continuously used worship building in Utah after the Salt Lake Tabernacle.

On September 22, 1970, it was added to the National Register of Historic Places. The offices of the Diocese of Utah and the Episcopal Retreat & Conference Center are located next door to the cathedral in the Episcopal Church Center of Utah.

== History ==
In 1866, the new missionary district of Montana, which also included Utah and Idaho, was formed by the Episcopal Church, with Daniel S. Tuttle elected as its first bishop. Prior to his consecration in 1867, Tuttle sent other clergy to the new territory ahead of him, including George W. Foote and T. W. Haskins. Foote and Haskins established a small congregation in Salt Lake City upon their arrival, and Bishop Tuttle left them to manage this congregation in 1867 while he traveled through the rest of the territory. The congregation met on the premises of the Young Men's Literary Institute in a building called Independence Hall just a few blocks southwest of the current cathedral site. The congregation was formally organized into St. Mark's parish on November 15, 1870.

Following the completion of the first transcontinental railroad in 1869, Bishop Tuttle returned to Salt Lake City and elected to base the work of the missionary district there. He commissioned architect Richard Upjohn to design a new cathedral to be built in Salt Lake City, and he purchased the land for its construction on April 20, 1870. Bishop Tuttle secured funding to build the cathedral primarily from Episcopalians in New York and Pennsylvania; the largest single donation of $500 was made by Brigham Young. The building's cornerstone was laid on July 30, 1870, and the first services were held in the cathedral's nave on September 3, 1871, while construction on the building continued. Once the nave and east transept were complete, the building was consecrated on May 14, 1874.

Expansion of the cathedral building continued for roughly 30 years after its consecration. The chancel, west transept, and Chapel of the Resurrection had all been completed by 1903, and the fabric of the cathedral remains roughly in this configuration today.

A fire on March 31, 1935, destroyed much of the interior of the cathedral, including some of the stained glass and the cathedral's pipe organ. The building was subsequently restored without significant modification to its original plan, and some of the original stained glass was successfully reinstated. A second smaller fire occurred in 1952.

The St. Mark's campus was impacted by earthquakes in 1962 and 2020.

Archbishop Desmond Tutu visited St. Mark's in 2002 where he preached on the subject of reconciliation and forgiveness.

St. Mark's and the Diocese of Utah hosted the 78th General Convention of the Episcopal Church in 2015, during which Bishop Michael Curry was elected the church's 27th Presiding Bishop, and the Canons of the Episcopal Church were also changed to allow same-sex marriage during this convention.

During a No Kings demonstration in downtown Salt Lake City on June 14, 2025, St. Mark's was opened as a place of refuge for participants following the deadly shooting incident on a nearby street.

=== Schools ===
St. Mark's School for Boys was founded in connection with the parish in 1867 at the direction of Bishop Tuttle. This was followed by Rowland Hall School for Girls in 1880. The two schools became independent of the parish in the 1930s, and they later merged to become Rowland Hall-St. Mark's in 1964. The school is currently called Rowland Hall and no longer has any affiliation with St. Mark's Cathedral or the Diocese of Utah.

=== Hospital ===
St. Mark's Hospital was founded at the direction of Bishop Tuttle in 1872 with support from local mining companies and Camp Douglas in order to treat injured railroad and mining workers. The hospital was sold in 1987 and remains in operation, but it no longer has any affiliation with St. Mark's Cathedral or the Diocese of Utah.

== Architecture ==
St. Mark's Cathedral was designed by architect Richard Upjohn in the Gothic Revival style. While Upjohn was well known for his many projects in this general style by the time he designed St. Mark's, this plan was deliberately kept more rustic than most of his other commissions in order to fit into its context serving a frontier mission district. St. Mark's is one of only two churches designed by Upjohn west of the Mississippi River.

=== Exterior ===
The outer walls of the cathedral are built of red sandstone. Members of The Church of Jesus Christ of Latter-day Saints had originally cut the stone for use in constructing the Salt Lake Temple. After granite was located and selected as preferable for the temple construction, the cut sandstone was purchased by the Episcopal Church for use in building the cathedral. The cathedral's exterior doors are painted red, as is common for Episcopal churches.

=== Interior ===
The building's layout is cruciform and oriented on a north-south axis with the altar at the north end. The ceiling is supported by exposed wood beams, and principal lighting is provided by hanging pendants along the central axis of the nave. The nave has one central aisle and ambulatory aisles along both walls. Total capacity of the cathedral is approximately 350 people.

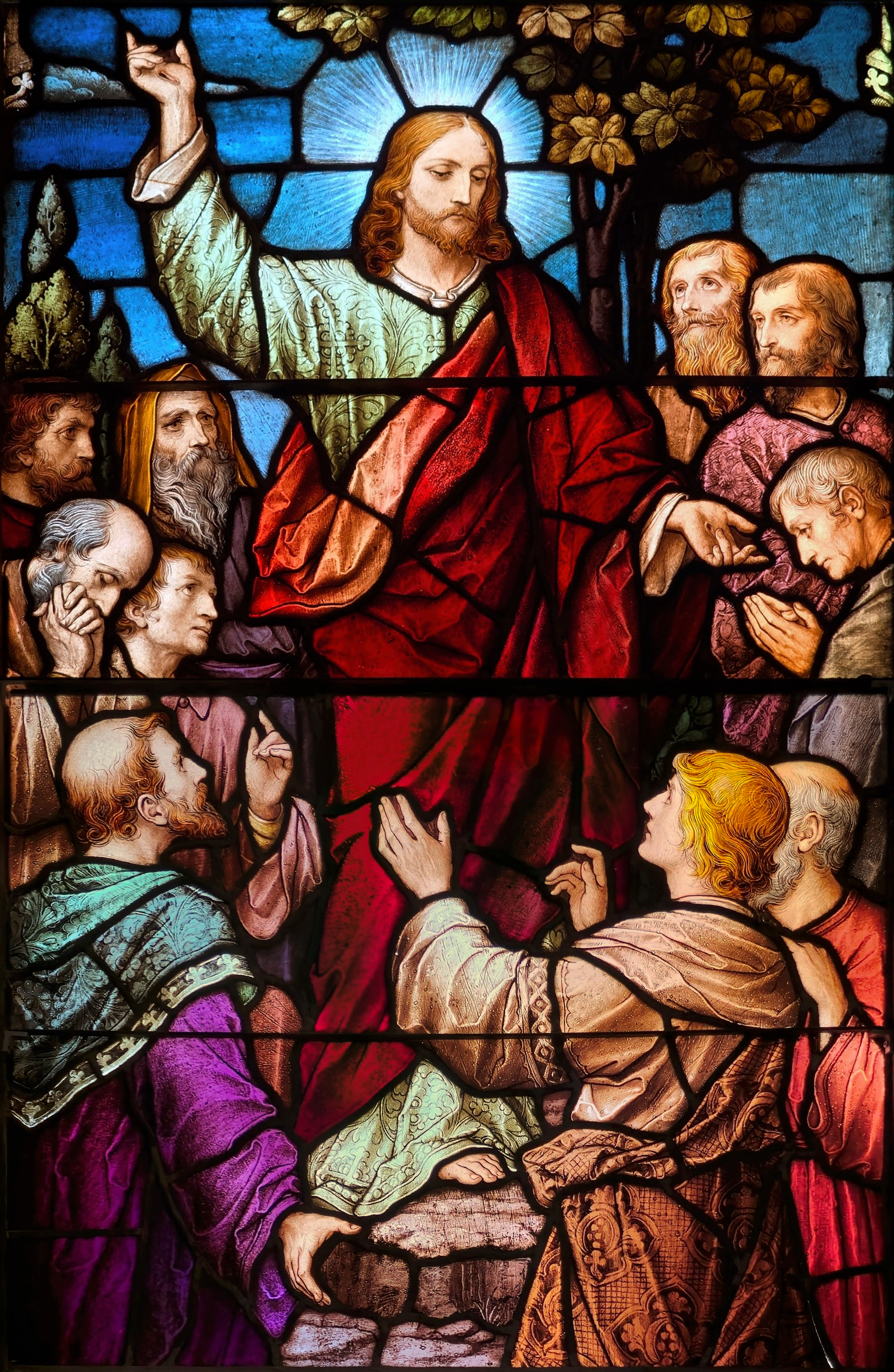
Window by Franz Xaver Zettler

A metal rood screen divides the chancel from the crossing, from which the pulpit (west side) and lectern (east side) protrude. A fixed altar rail encloses the original high altar against the north wall of the chancel. A more modern freestanding altar is placed in the center of the chancel. The bishop's throne (cathedra) is located on the west side of the chancel against the wall separating the chancel from the Chapel of the Resurrection. The upper portion of this wall has patterned openings to allow light through. Seating for most other clergy is located on the east side of the chancel.

The Chapel of the Resurrection is located in the space between the chancel and the west transept, with the altar against the north wall.

The baptismal font is located in the east transept near the door leading to the Cathedral Center, and it is surrounded by a railing.

The nave has a gallery at the south end that houses the Bigelow organ and choir, which was added in 1967. Beyond the gallery to the south is the narthex, which opens onto 100 South.

==== Stained Glass ====
The cathedral has some of the finest stained glass in the state of Utah including four Tiffany Studios windows located in the chancel dated 1916, three windows designed by Charles Jay Connick, and one designed by Franz Xaver Zettler.

=== Additional Facilities ===
The Cathedral Center, opened in 2007, provides office, classroom, and meeting space directly connected to the cathedral. The Dean's Hall is the largest space in the Cathedral Center with the ability to accommodate up to 300 people. The Cathedral Center has more usable space than is currently required for the operation of the parish, and therefore some of the office space has been leased to local businesses since 2019.

The Cathedral Center is equipped with rooftop solar panels to help offset the energy usage of the facility.

== Music ==
Music has been an integral part of the ministry of St. Mark's since its inception. In addition to the organs described below, the cathedral has a grand piano and occasionally employs other instrumentalists. The cathedral also has an adult choir which sings weekly, and the building is frequently used as a concert and recital venue by outside groups.

=== Pipe Organs ===
St. Mark's is home to Bigelow & Co., opus 35 (2011), which boasts three manuals and pedals, 41 stops, and 40 ranks. The Bigelow organ is installed in the rear gallery at the south end of the nave. The main case surrounds the small rose window on the south wall, and the Positive division hangs from the gallery rail. The organ has an electric stop action and a mostly mechanical key action except where electro-pneumatic action was necessary due to space constraints. The organ is unusual in that the entire Great division, with the exception of the 8' and 4' principals, is under expression.

St. Mark's also has a historic organ built by Alex & Robert Mirrlees in 1854. This small instrument has only one manual and four ranks. It was restored and installed by Bigelow & Co. as their opus 14 (1984), and it is located in the west transept between the pulpit and the entrance to the Chapel of the Resurrection.

==== Previous Organs ====
The first pipe organ at St. Mark's was Johnson & Son, opus 589 (1882) which was originally located in the east transept. This instrument was moved to the chancel when it was completed in 1903.

Following mechanical challenges with the Johnson organ, M.P. Möller provided a new instrument, opus 1621 (1913), incorporating at least some of the Johnson pipework. This instrument was also located in the chancel, and it was destroyed in the 1935 fire.

Following the fire, the cathedral procured a secondhand Wurlitzer Hope-Jones Unit Orchestra, opus 802 (1924), from the Victory Theatre in Salt Lake City. This instrument was used until 1967, and it was then sold to a private individual.

To celebrate the Diocese of Utah's centennial, the cathedral commissioned Holtkamp opus 1820 (1967), which was installed in a newly constructed rear gallery. The Holtkamp organ was removed by Bigelow ahead of the installation of the current organ in 2011, and its materials were incorporated into Bigelow's opus 36 for St. Ambrose Catholic Church in Salt Lake City.

== Current Activities ==
The St. Mark's community remains active and visible in its community through regular worship and a variety of outreach programs.

=== Worship ===
St. Mark's holds regular worship services throughout the week, anchored by a principal Sunday Eucharist at 10:30am, which is also available to watch via livestream. Morning and Evening Prayer and celebrations of the Eucharist are offered throughout the week on a regular schedule.

=== Outreach ===
The most visible outreach program currently in operation is Hildegard's Pantry, which has been in operation since the early 1980s. The food pantry was moved into a new dedicated facility on cathedral grounds in 2006. The pantry currently serves around 4000 people per month.

St. Mark's provides financial and spiritual support to the community living at The Point by Switchpoint near the Salt Lake City International Airport. This supportive housing community was created, in part with startup capital from St. Mark's, for persons who have experienced homelessness. Worship services are held on site each Sunday evening, followed by a community meal. And Hildegard's Pantry operates a satellite location on site.

St. Mark's also participates in other community activities and ministries, including ecumenical activities with other church groups, use of facilities as emergency shelters during extreme winter weather, support for Utah Pride Festival, and other initiatives.

== Membership & Demographics ==
The cathedral reported 990 members in 2015 and 714 members in 2023; no membership statistics were reported in 2024 parochial reports.

Average Sunday attendance (ASA) has grown steadily following a low point in 2020 during the COVID-19 pandemic. ASA effectively returned to pre-pandemic levels in 2023, and the most recent available ASA of 218 from 2025 is the highest reported within the available data range (since 2015).

Based on available survey data, less than a quarter of members who responded report having been raised in the Episcopal or Anglican faith. The largest single faith background among members was Latter Day Saints at more than a quarter of respondents. Members represent higher levels of education than the general population with more than three quarters of members holding an undergraduate degree and more than half of members holding a graduate degree.

== See also ==
- List of the Episcopal cathedrals of the United States
- List of cathedrals in the United States
- List of the oldest churches in the United States
- Episcopal Diocese of Utah
- Rowland Hall
- St. Mark's Hospital
