= St. Mark's Hospital (Utah) =

- Hospital Corporation of America

Geography
- Location: Millcreek, Utah, United States
- Coordinates: 40°41′10.9″N 111°51′24.7″W

Services
- Beds: 317

Links
- Website: https://mountainstar.com/locations/st-marks-hospital/

St. Mark's Hospital is a 317-bed short-term acute care hospital located in Millcreek, Utah, in the United States. St. Mark's has provided medical services to Salt Lake Valley since its founding in 1872.

St. Mark's is accredited by the Joint Commission on Accreditation of Healthcare Organizations (JCAHO) and is a Level II trauma center as verified by the American College of Surgeons. It is classified as a general medical and surgical facility, and is a teaching hospital. St. Mark's hospital has 317 licensed beds, more than 600 physician medical staff, and over 1,500 employees and volunteers. It handles more than 80,000 outpatient visits, 15,000 inpatient admissions, more than 15,000 surgeries annually, as well as more than 3,500 deliveries a year.

== History ==
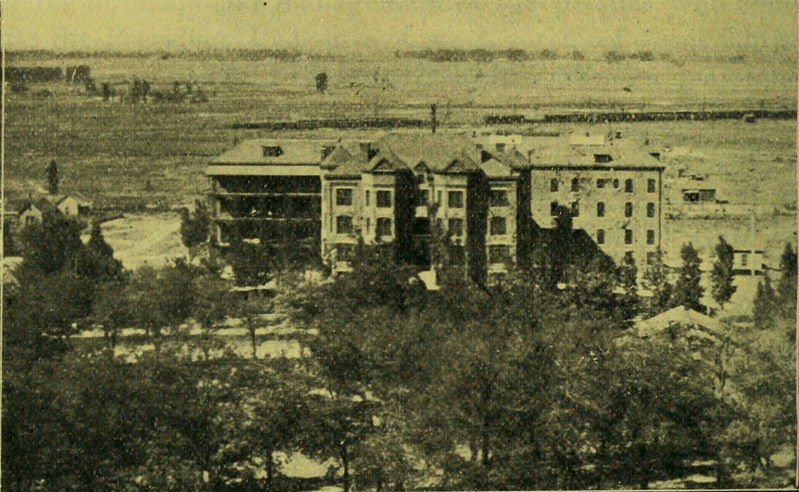
St. Mark's 1893 hospital campus, located northwest of downtown, as seen circa 1904

Daniel S. Tuttle, the Episcopal bishop, saw the need for a new hospital, and had St. Mark's built with contributions from local businessmen. The initial structure in Salt Lake City, constructed from adobe and consisting of 6 beds, began operating on April 30, 1872, making it Utah's first hospital. It moved to larger facilities in 1879 and again in 1893.

In 1894, St. Mark's Hospital School of Nursing was founded, to address the difficulty of hiring nurses in the area. It was the first school of nursing established in the intermountain West. The school entered a partnership with the University of Utah, through which students could earn university credit, but discontinued it in 1948 after the university attempted to gain control of it; it affiliated with Westminster College the same year. In 1968 the hospital terminated its nursing diploma program and by 1970 had transitioned to students to the college's baccalaureate program, now forming Westminster College's School of Nursing and Health Sciences.

In 1970, construction on the current iteration of St. Mark's Hospital began, and it was completed in 1973. In 1988, the Episcopal Diocese of Utah sold St. Mark's Hospital to Hospital Corporation of America (HCA), currently the world's largest hospital company.

== Hospital accolades and accreditations ==
- Accredited by the Joint Commission on Accreditation of Healthcare Organizations
- The Joint Commission gave St. Mark's Hospital The Gold Seal of Approval as a Top Performer on Key Quality Measures (2018)
- St. Mark's Hospital has been ranked favorably by The Leapfrog Group, a national hospital safety watchdog organization.
- Healthgrades awarded St. Mark's with the America's 100 Best Hospitals for Joint Replacement Award (2020); the Coronary Intervention Excellence Award (2019); and the Joint Replacement Excellence Award (2019).

== Services ==
St. Mark's offers primary and specialty health services including Bariatric surgery, Behavioral Health services, Cardiology, Diabetic, Diagnostics and Laboratory services, Emergency Care, Gastroenterology, Vascular Surgery, Oncology, Orthopedic Care, Pain management, Physical Therapy and Rehabilitation, Robotic Surgery, Senior health services, Sleep Disorder Care, Spine Care, Trauma Center services, and Urology.

St. Mark's also offers women's health services including: Breast Health Services, Gynecology, Gynecologic Surgery, Infertility Care, Midwifery, Maternity Care (including labor and delivery and postpartum care) and Pelvic Floor Physical Therapy.

St. Mark's is capable of sending and receiving patients via helicopter transport.
