= Keely Kelleher =

American alpine skier (born 1984)

Keely Kelleher (born August 12, 1984) is an American alpine skier who has competed since 2000. Her best World Cup finish was 20th at a super giant slalom event in Canada in 2009.

Kelleher was named to the US team for the 2010 Winter Olympics in late 2009.
