= Marilyn Mason =

American organist and academic (1925–2019)

Background information
- Born: June 29, 1925; Alva, Oklahoma, U.S.
- Died: April 4, 2019 (aged 93) Fort Lauderdale, Florida, U.S.
- Occupations: University professor, teacher, soloist
- Instrument: Organ
- Years active: 1947–2014
- Website: www-personal.umich.edu/~mamstein/home.html

Marilyn Mason (June 29, 1925 – April 4, 2019) was an American concert organist, recording artist, and professor. Mason joined the staff of the University of Michigan in Ann Arbor in 1947, became chair of the organ department in 1962, and was named a professor in 1965.

== Life and career ==
Born in Alva, Oklahoma, Mason enrolled at the University of Michigan (U-M), where she earned both a bachelor's and master's degree in music. She was so proficient, she joined the U-M music faculty in 1947, even before she had graduated. Except for spending one summer in France studying organ with artists Maurice Duruflé and Nadia Boulanger, and some additional time earning the Doctor of Sacred Music degree at Union Theological Seminary in New York City, Mason spent almost her entire career at U-M.

Her career as performer, lecturer, adjudicator, and teacher took her throughout the western world, at one point performing more than thirty recitals per year. In 1988, she was described as "among the important influences on the American organ scene in the second half of the 20th century" by the American Guild of Organists New York Chapter when she was named International Performer of the Year. Over her career, she commissioned over 75 original works for the organ. She was the featured guest organist of the 1971 and 1980 International Contemporary Organ Music Festivals held at the Hartt School of Music. In 1985, a C. B. Fisk organ modeled on the eighteenth-century organs of Gottfried Silbermann was commissioned by the University of Michigan School of Music and named the Marilyn Mason Organ in her honor. She was the first American woman organist to perform in Westminster Abbey, the first woman organist to play in Latin America, and the first American organist to perform in Egypt. Mason's teaching legacy was recognized in the fall of 2007 when the 47th Conference on Organ Music, which she founded in 1960, was dedicated to her in celebration of her 60th year of teaching. On the occasion of the 2009 GALA, sponsored by the national council of the American Guild of Organists, she was honored as the seventh in a series of organ teachers/performers who have reached the highest level of success in their profession.

A biographical video retrospective, "A Life's Harmony", was created in 2007 to recognize Mason's exceptional teaching and mentorship. She was the longest-serving faculty member at the University of Michigan, retiring after 67 years, and was recognized in 2013 with a symposium in her honor titled "Teacher of Music, Teacher of Life".

== Death ==
Mason died on April 4, 2019, in Fort Lauderdale, Florida, aged 93.
