= Carolyn Tanner Irish =

American Episcopal bishop (1940–2021)

The Right Reverend Carolyn Tanner Irish
- Bishop of Utah
- Church: Episcopal Church
- Province: Province VIII
- Diocese: Utah
- In office: 1996–2010
- Predecessor: George E. Bates
- Successor: Scott B. Hayashi

Orders
- Ordination: 1983 (deacon); 1984 (priest) by John T. Walker
- Consecration: May 31, 1996 by Edmond L. Browning

Personal details
- Born: Carolyn Tanner; April 14, 1940 Salt Lake City, Utah, United States
- Died: June 29, 2021 (aged 81) Salt Lake City, Utah, United States
- Denomination: Anglican (prev. LDS)
- Parents: Obert C. Tanner; Grace Adams
- Spouse: Leon E. Irish (m. 1960; div. 1988); Frederick Quinn (m. 2001)
- Children: 6

Carolyn Tanner Irish (April 14, 1940 – June 29, 2021) was an American bishop. She was the 10th Bishop of the Episcopal Diocese of Utah. At the time of her election and consecration in 1996 she became the fourth woman in the Episcopal Church to hold the office of bishop.

== Education ==
Irish received a BA degree with high honors in philosophy from the University of Michigan in 1962 after having transferred from Stanford University where she began her studies in 1958. Also at Michigan she was granted membership in the Phi Kappa Phi Honorary Society. In 1968, she earned a Master of Letters (MLitt) degree in moral philosophy from Linacre College, University of Oxford. Having enrolled in seminary in 1979, Irish received a Master of Divinity (MDiv) degree, cum laude, from the Virginia Theological Seminary in 1983. She held honorary doctoral degrees from Virginia Theological Seminary, Westminster College in Salt Lake City, the University of Utah, The Church Divinity School of the Pacific, the Salt Lake Community College, and Utah State University.

== Background ==
Irish was born in 1940 and raised in Salt Lake City, Utah, daughter of Utah businessman, philanthropist, and University of Utah philosophy professor Obert Clark Tanner. During her upbringing, her family was active in the Church of Jesus Christ of Latter-day Saints, but she stopped attending church after she left home for college. In 1960, while at Stanford University, she married Leon E. Irish, another Stanford student, who later earned a law degree from the University of Michigan and a D.Phil. from Oxford University. She studied at Linacre College, Oxford, where she was an honorary fellow. Together they had four children; Stephen, Jessica, Thomas, and Emily.

Because of her children, Irish began attending church again in 1975 and said of the Episcopal Church, "I was surprised when I realized that this was my home." By 1977 she was considering entering the ordained ministry and two years later began seminary. Having been raised and baptized in the LDS Church, there has been debate in some circles over the validity of her baptism and subsequent ordination because of differences in theology between the two churches. However, at the time of her confirmation into the Episcopal Church, her baptism was recognized as valid. The sacraments of baptism and confirmation are both prerequisites of ordination in the Episcopal Church.

In 1983, Irish was ordained to the diaconate, followed in 1984 by her ordination to the priesthood in the Episcopal Diocese of Washington, DC. As a priest, she served congregations in the dioceses of Washington, D.C., Virginia, and Michigan. She was appointed archdeacon in the Diocese of Michigan in 1986, and later served on the staff of the Shalem Institute for Spiritual Formation, and the Washington National Cathedral.

Throughout her service, Irish led a program called Project Jubilee. All 22 churches and a number of ministries have benefited from Project Jubilee grants and loans that purchased land, paid mortgages, assisted construction, and made the very existence of several parishes a reality. Most recently, Project Jubilee funds were used for a portion of the new Episcopal Church Center of Utah. The funds came from the Perpetual Trust of Sts. Peter and Paul, which resulted from the sale of St. Mark's Hospital under her predecessor, Bishop George Bates. Irish was originally elected as bishop coadjutor near the end of Bishop Bates' service. Irish also followed a policy of financial transparency, so all could see the monetary blessings the diocese has had to enrich its work and outreach.

In addition to her episcopal duties, Irish also served as chair of the board of O.C. Tanner Co., the employee recognition company founded by her father. Irish also served on the Standing Committee on Ecumenical Relations for the National Episcopal Church and the Advisory Board of the Shalem Institute for Spiritual Formation as well as the boards of directors of the Tanner Lectures on Human Values and the Nature Conservancy of Utah. The Carolyn Tanner Irish Humanities Building at the University of Utah bears her name. She also established a reputation as a community leader. Outspoken from the start of her service, she supported minorities and opposed allowing guns in churches. She also fought political movements to make English the only language that could be used in governmental laws and information. She held honorary doctorates from the University of Utah, Utah State University, Salt Lake Community College, Westminster and Weber State University.

In 1988, Irish was divorced from her husband after 28 years of marriage. In 1999, she took a leave of absence to cope with her alcoholism. In 2001, she married the Rev. Frederick Quinn, a retired foreign service officer and author.

In 2010, Irish retired from her Episcopal Church position and continued her Utah ties, but primarily lived in Washington D.C. She and her husband had six adult children between them, with most of them living in the eastern United States.

== See also ==
- Episcopal Church in the United States of America
- Succession of Bishops of the Episcopal Church in the United States

Episcopal Church (USA) titles
Preceded by George E. Bates	10th Bishop of Utah; 1996–2010	Succeeded by Scott B. Hayashi
