= Episcopal Diocese of Utah =

Diocese of the Episcopal Church in the United States

Coordinates: 40°46′04″N 111°53′04″W

Diocese of Utah

Location
- Ecclesiastical province: Province VIII

Statistics
- Congregations: 22 (2025)
- Members: 3,842 (2025)

Information
- Rite: Episcopal
- Cathedral: St. Mark's Cathedral

Current leadership
- Bishop: Phyllis A. Spiegel

Map
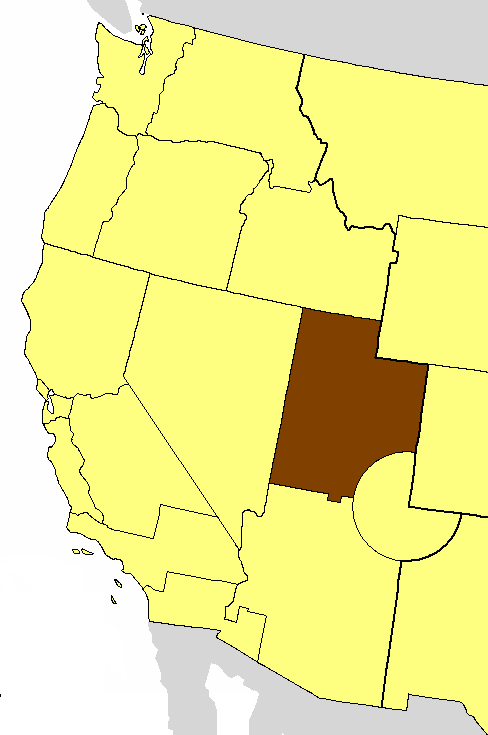
- Location of the Diocese of Utah

Website
- www.episcopal-ut.org

The Episcopal Diocese of Utah is a diocese of the Episcopal Church in the United States encompassing the state of Utah, other than the southeastern part of the Utah which is included in the Navajoland Area Mission. The diocese also includes a small part of northern Arizona.

In 1867, the Episcopal Church was the first Protestant church organized in Utah. The diocesan offices and cathedral, St. Mark's Cathedral, are in Salt Lake City. The current bishop is the Rt. Rev. Phyllis A. Spiegel, whose consecration took place on September 17, 2022.

In 2025, the diocese reported average Sunday attendance (ASA) of 1,244 persons, down from 1,692 in 2015. Membership statistics for 2025 showed 3,842 persons in 22 churches, a decrease from 5,248 members in 2016. The 22 filing congregations of the diocese had $3,135,283 in plate and pledge income in 2025.

== History ==
Daniel Sylvester Tuttle was chosen as missionary bishop of Montana, Idaho and Utah on October 5, 1866, and was consecrated on May 1, 1867. He served as bishop until 1886. Tuttle arrived in Salt Lake City on July 4, 1867. George Foote and T. W. Haskins, who held the first church service at Independence Hall in May 1867, preceded him. The cornerstone of St. Mark's Cathedral was laid July 30, 1870. The parish was formally organized in November of that year, with Tuttle as rector. The cathedral was occupied in May 1871, and is listed on the National Register of Historic Places. It is the third oldest Episcopal Cathedral in America. The second bishop was Abiel Leonard. Under his leadership, numerous churches were opened in mining and other communities, including missions to the Ute Indians in the Uintah Basin.

== Bishops of Utah ==
The bishops of Utah are as follows:

#	Name	Tenure
1.	Daniel Sylvester Tuttle	1867–1886
2.	Abiel Leonard	1888–1903
3.	Franklin S. Spalding	1904–1914
4.	Paul Jones	1914–1918
5	Arthur W. Moulton	1920–1946
6.	Stephen C. Clark	1946–1950
7.	Richard S. Watson	1951–1971
8.	Otis Charles	1971–1986
9.	George E. Bates	1986–1996
10.	Carolyn Tanner Irish	1996–2010
11.	Scott B. Hayashi	2010–2022
12.	Phyllis A. Spiegel	2022-

== Congregations ==
The Episcopal Church in Utah is part of the worldwide Anglican Communion.

- Cathedral Church of St. Mark, Salt Lake City
- St. Mary's Episcopal Church, Provo
- St. Michael's Episcopal Church, Brigham City
- Church of the Resurrection, Centerville
- St. James Episcopal Church, Midvale
- Episcopal Church of the Good Shepherd, Ogden
- All Saints Episcopal Church, Salt Lake City
- St. Paul's Episcopal Church, Salt Lake City
- Grace Episcopal Church, St. George
- St. Jude's Episcopal Church, Cedar City
- St. Peter's Episcopal Church, Clearfield
- St. Barnabas' Episcopal Church, Tooele
- St. John's Episcopal Church, Logan
- St. Luke's Episcopal Church, Park City

== Educational and other institutions ==
St. Mark's school opened on July 1, 1867, the first non-Mormon school in Utah. Rowland Hall boarding and day school for girls opened in 1880. The two schools combined and became Rowland Hall-St. Mark's School in 1964. St. Mark's Hospital was organized in 1872 with representatives from the Episcopal Church, Camp Douglas and the mining industry. The hospital moved to larger quarters several times, and is now located at 1200 East and 3900 South. The hospital was sold in 1987. Hildegarde's Pantry offers food and assistance to people in need.

== See also ==
- Anglicanism
