= Robert Breault =

American operatic tenor

Robert Breault (born 1963) is an American operatic tenor. Born in Michigan, he holds a B.M. degree (magna cum laude) from St. Norbert College (1985) from which he received a distinguished alumni award in 1997. In addition, he holds a M.M. (1987), and a D.M.A. (1991) from the University of Michigan where he studied voice with soprano Lorna Haywood. His early training also included two years of study at the San Francisco Merola Opera Program, and an internship with Michigan Opera Theatre. He lives in Salt Lake City, Utah, where he teaches voice and serves as director of opera at the University of Utah School of Music.

== Performances ==
He is known for his work with opera companies that include New York City Opera, San Francisco Opera, Michigan Opera Theatre, Opera Theatre of St. Louis, Florentine Opera, Arizona Opera, Portland Opera, Fort Worth Opera, Edmonton Opera, Opera Hamilton, Opéra de Nice, Atlanta Opera, Arizona Opera, Chautauqua Opera, Madison Opera, New Orleans Opera, Opera Orchestra of New York, Opera Pacific, Utah Symphony and Opera, and Washington Concert Opera. His extensive concert career includes performances with orchestras that include, the Atlanta Symphony Orchestra, Cleveland Orchestra, Colorado Symphony Orchestra, Edmonton Symphony Orchestra, Florida Philharmonic Orchestra, Florida Orchestra, Il Complesso Barocco, Jerusalem Symphony Orchestra, Milwaukee Symphony, Montreal Symphony, Mormon Tabernacle Choir, National Symphony Orchestra (Washington, D.C.), National Symphony Orchestra (Taiwan), L’Orchestre Métropolitain du Grand Montréal, Orchestre Philharmonique de Monte-Carlo, Orquesta Sinfonica Sinaloa de las Artes, Mazatlán, Mexico, the Orquesta Sinfónica de Puerto Rico, Pacific Symphony, Philadelphia Orchestra, Philharmonia Baroque Orchestra, San Diego Symphony, San Francisco Symphony, Santa Fe Symphony, St. Louis Symphony, St. Lawrence Choir, Toronto Mendelssohn Choir, Tucson Symphony Orchestra, Utah Symphony and Opera, The Vancouver Bach Choir, The Vancouver Chamber Choir, and the Virginia Symphony Orchestra.

== Career ==
As a performer Breault is known for his strong acting skills and diverse repertoire, which ranges from Handel to current. He was honored by New York City Opera in 2007 with a 'Kolozsvar Award' for his performance in Handel's ‘’Semele’’. He has recorded several world premieres, including James DeMars’ opera ‘’Guadalupe’’ and his oratorio An American Requiem with the Mormon Tabernacle Choir, and Laurent Petitgirard's Joseph Merrick dit Elephant Man. Active as a singing teacher since 1992, Breault has trained and worked with several successful singers including Celena Shafer, Paula Delligatti, Jennifer Larson, Gary Moss, Chad Hilligus, and Hugo Vera. He works regularly as a voice teacher and director with the La Musica Lirica training program in Novafeltria, Italy. He is also active as a recitalist and had presented two debut recitals with the San Francisco Opera Schwabacher Debut Recital series. Robert's dual role as singer and educator has been noted by the likes of Brian Kellow who, upon hearing Breault in Handel's Semele at New York City Opera, wrote a summary of his career in 2007 for Opera News.

== Recordings ==
- 2008 James Demars, '’Guadalupe’’ Canyon Records
- 2004 Petitgirard, Joseph Merrick dit Elephant Man, Opéra de Nice DVD (Marco Polo label)
- 2003 Kay Ward, There is a Season
- 2003 Kay Ward, The Breath of Faith
- 2000 Mormon Tabernacle Choir, A Mormon Tabernacle Christmas, Telarc
- 2000 Richard Smith, Mountain Requiem, Mountain Chorale and Orchestra
- 1999 Laurent Petitgirard, Joseph Merrick dit Elephant Man
- 1996 Haydn, Lord Nelson Mass, St. Lawrence Choir/Montreal Symphony
- 1996 The International Children's Choir, Celestial Realms.
- 1996 Tenor Soloist, Covenant Christmas Sampler
- 1995 James DeMars An American Requiem with the Mormon Tabernacle Choir
- 1993 Pachelbel Organ Works Vol. 4. With Organist Marilyn Mason. Musical Heritage Label
- 1993 Pachelbel Organ Works Vol. 3. With Organist Marilyn Mason. Musical Heritage Label
- 1991 Pachelbel Organ Works Vol. 2. with Organist Marilyn Mason. Musical Heritage Label

== Opera roles performed ==
- Georges Bizet Les Pêcheurs de perles Nadir
  - Carmen Don Jose
- Benjamin Britten Turn of the Screw Proremiere)
- Gaetano Donizetti Don Pasquale Ernesto
  - Lucia di Lammermoor Edgardo/Arturo
- Carlisle Floyd Susannah Sam
- George Gershwin Of Thee I Sing Jenkins
- Gordon Getty Plump Jack Shallow/Hal
- Christoph Willibald Gluck Ezio Massimo
- George Friedrich Handel Rodelinda Grimoaldo
  - Semele Jupiter/Apollo
  - Hercules Hyllus
  - Saul Jonathan
  - Solomon Zadok
- Leoš Janáček Jenůfa Steva
- Franz Lehár The Merry Widow Camille/St. Brioche
- Jules Massenet Esclarmonde Roland
  - Werther Werther
- Gian Carlo Menotti Amahl and the Night Visitors Kaspar
- Claudio Monteverdi L’Incoronazione di Poppea Nerone
- Wolfgang Amadeus Mozart Don Giovanni Ottavio
  - Die Zauberflöte Tamino
  - Die Entführung aus dem Serail Belmonte/Pedrillo
  - Idomeneo Idomeneo
- Thea Musgrave Pontalba-A Louisiana Legacy Célestin (World premiere)
- Otto Nicolai Merry Wives of Windsor Fenton
- Laurent Petitgirard Joseph Merrick dit Elephant Man Tom Norman (World premiere)
- Giacomo Puccini La Rondine Prunier/Ruggero
  - La Bohème Rudolfo
  - Madama Butterfly Pinkerton
  - Gianni Schicchi Rinuccio
  - Turandot Pong, Pang
  - Tosca Cavaradossi
- Gioachino Rossini Armida Ubaldo/Gernando
  - Il Barbiere di Siviglia Almaviva
  - La Cenerentola Ramiro
  - Tancredi Argirio
- Bedřich Smetana The Bartered Bride Vashek
- Richard Strauss Ariadne auf Naxos Brighella/Scaramuccio
  - Der Rosenkavalier Tenor
  - Salome Juden
- Giuseppe Verdi Falstaff Fenton
  - Macbeth Malcolm/Macduff
  - Nabucco Ismaele
  - Rigoletto Duke
  - La traviata Alfredo/Gastone
  - Stiffelio Stiffelio
- Richard Wagner Tristan und Isolde Sailor/Shepherd
- William Walton Troilus and Cressida Pandarus
