= Richard S. Watson =

Bishop of the Episcopal Diocese of Utah

- Diocese: Episcopal Diocese of Utah
- In office: 1951-1971

Orders
- Consecration: May 1, 1951

Personal details
- Born: July 14, 1902
- Died: July 6, 1987 (aged 84)

Richard S. Watson (July 14, 1902 - July 6, 1987) was bishop of the Episcopal Diocese of Utah, serving from 1951 to 1971. He was consecrated on May 1, 1951.
