= Daniel S. Tuttle =

American Episcopal bishop (1837–1923)

The Most Reverend Daniel S. Tuttle
- 13th Presiding Bishop of the Episcopal Church
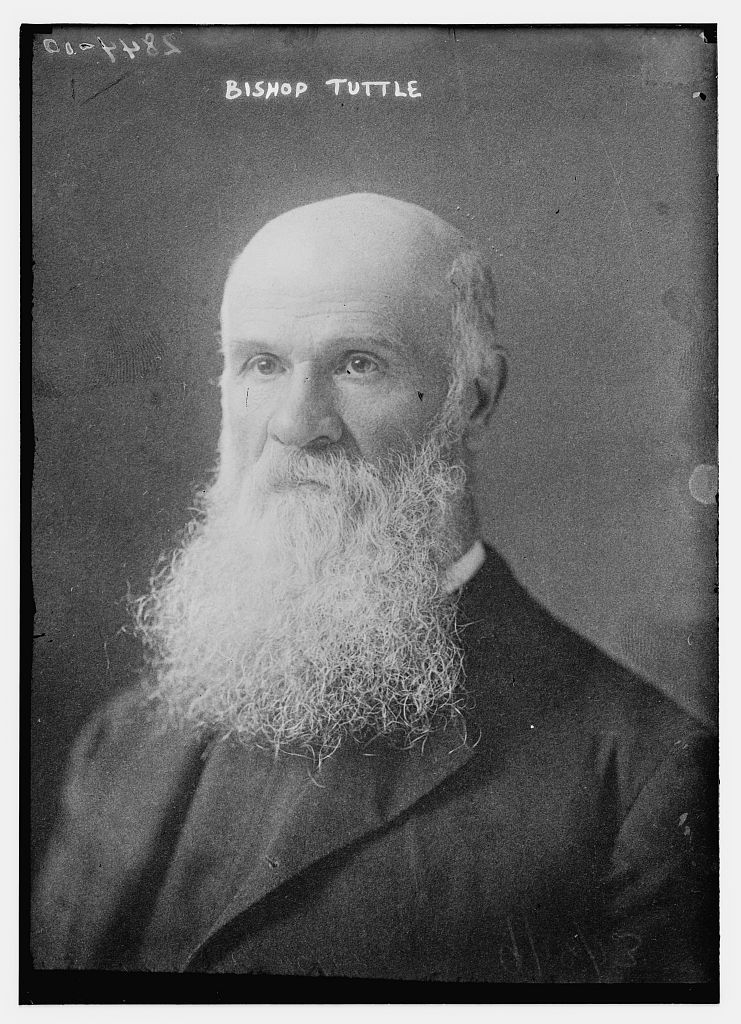
- Tuttle, c. 1917
- Church: Episcopal Church
- In office: 1903–1923
- Predecessor: Thomas M. Clark
- Successor: Alexander Charles Garrett
- Other post: Bishop of Missouri (1886-1923)
- Previous post: Missionary Bishop of Montana, Idaho and Utah (1866-1886)

Orders
- Ordination: July 19, 1863 by Horatio Potter
- Consecration: May 1, 1867 by John Henry Hopkins

Personal details
- Born: January 26, 1837 Windham, New York, United States
- Died: April 17, 1923 (aged 86) St. Louis, Missouri, United States
- Buried: Bellefontaine Cemetery
- Denomination: Anglican
- Parents: Daniel Bliss Tuttle & Abigail Clark Stimpson
- Spouse: Harriet Minerva Foote (m. 1865)
- Children: 12

Daniel Sylvester Tuttle (January 26, 1837 – April 17, 1923) was consecrated a bishop of the Episcopal Church in 1866. His first assignment was as Bishop of Montana, a missionary field that included Montana, Utah, and Idaho.

== Early and family life ==
He was born on January 26, 1837, and graduated from an academy in Delhi, New York, in 1850. Bishop Wainwright confirmed him in the Episcopal Church shortly before he entered what was then Columbia College. After graduating in 1857, Tuttle attended the General Theological Seminary and graduated in 1862.

He married Harriet Minerva Foote of Greene County, New York, and they had many children before her death in St. Louis, Missouri, in 1899 during one of her husband's missionary journeys.

== Career ==
He was ordained deacon and in 1863 was ordained priest and assigned rural parishes. He learned he had been elected missionary bishop of the territory of Montana, with additional jurisdiction over Utah and Idaho. Presiding Bishop John Henry Hopkins of Vermont, along with bishops Horatio Potter of New York and William Henry Odenheimer of New Jersey consecrated their young colleague. Since Tuttle was only 29, canon law required him to wait until he was 30 before he could exercise his office. He took the Union Pacific Railroad as far west as then possible, to North Platte, Nebraska, then boarded a stage coach for Denver, Colorado, and arrived on June 11, 1867. He eventually established his home base in Salt Lake City, but traveled widely, by railroad and other means. In 1880 Montana was removed from his mission, leaving him with Utah and Idaho. In 1886 the General Convention added territory in Nevada, since the missionary bishop of Nevada and Arizona, Ozi William Whitaker, had translated and become bishop of Pennsylvania. Instead, Tuttle accepted a call to serve as bishop of Missouri although he had rejected a similar offer in 1868.

During Tuttle's residency in Salt Lake City, he oversaw the construction of St. Mark's Cathedral, the first non-Mormon religious building in Utah, followed by the establishment of St. Mark's School for boys and girls in 1867, St. Mark's Hospital in 1872, and Rowland Hall school for girls in 1881.

On May 26, 1886, Tuttle was elected bishop of the Diocese of Missouri. According to his own published remembrances, he became the bishop of Missouri when on the morning of August 9, 1886, he read the letter notifying him of his election to that see. "When I took the letter in hand to read, I was Bishop of Utah, and after I had read it, as I understood the matter, I was [translated as] Bishop of Missouri." (Missionary to the Mountain West: Reminiscences of Episcopal Bishop Daniel S. Tuttle, 1866-1886. "Second Call to Missouri, 1886", Daniel Sylvester Tuttle, University of Utah Press, Salt Lake City, 1906, p. 480.) Bishop Tuttle served in that position in the Diocese of Missouri until his death. From 1903 to 1923, Tuttle also served as presiding bishop of the Episcopal Church in the United States of America. The presiding bishop, at the time of Tuttle's consecration, was the senior bishop in order of consecration, and Tuttle ended up serving as bishop for 56 years and helped consecrate 89 bishops.

During his tenure as presiding bishop, Tuttle preached at the closing service of the 1908 Lambeth Conference in St Paul's Cathedral in London, England.

Tuttle wrote a memoir, called Reminiscences of a Missionary Bishop, published in 1906. His memoir has extensive first-person accounts of his service among the Mormons in Salt Lake City, including his meetings and other dealings with Brigham Young and other local leaders.

== Death ==
He died on April 17, 1923, and was buried at Bellefontaine Cemetery in St. Louis, Missouri.

== See also ==
- List of presiding bishops of the Episcopal Church in the United States of America
- List of Episcopal bishops of the United States
- List of bishops of the Episcopal Church in the United States of America
- Episcopal Diocese of Idaho
- Episcopal Diocese of Montana
- Episcopal Diocese of Missouri
- Episcopal Diocese of Utah

Episcopal Church (USA) titles
Preceded by Thomas March Clark	13th Presiding Bishop; 1903–1923	Succeeded by Alexander Charles Garrett
