= Fritz Schulz =

Fritz Schulz may refer to:

- Fritz Schulz (jurist) (1879–1957), German jurist and legal historian
- Fritz W. Schulz (1884–1962), German marine artist and illustrator
- Fritz Schulz (footballer) (1886–1918), German footballer
- Fritz Schulz (actor) (1896–1972), film actor
