= Christian socialism =

Type of socialist philosophy

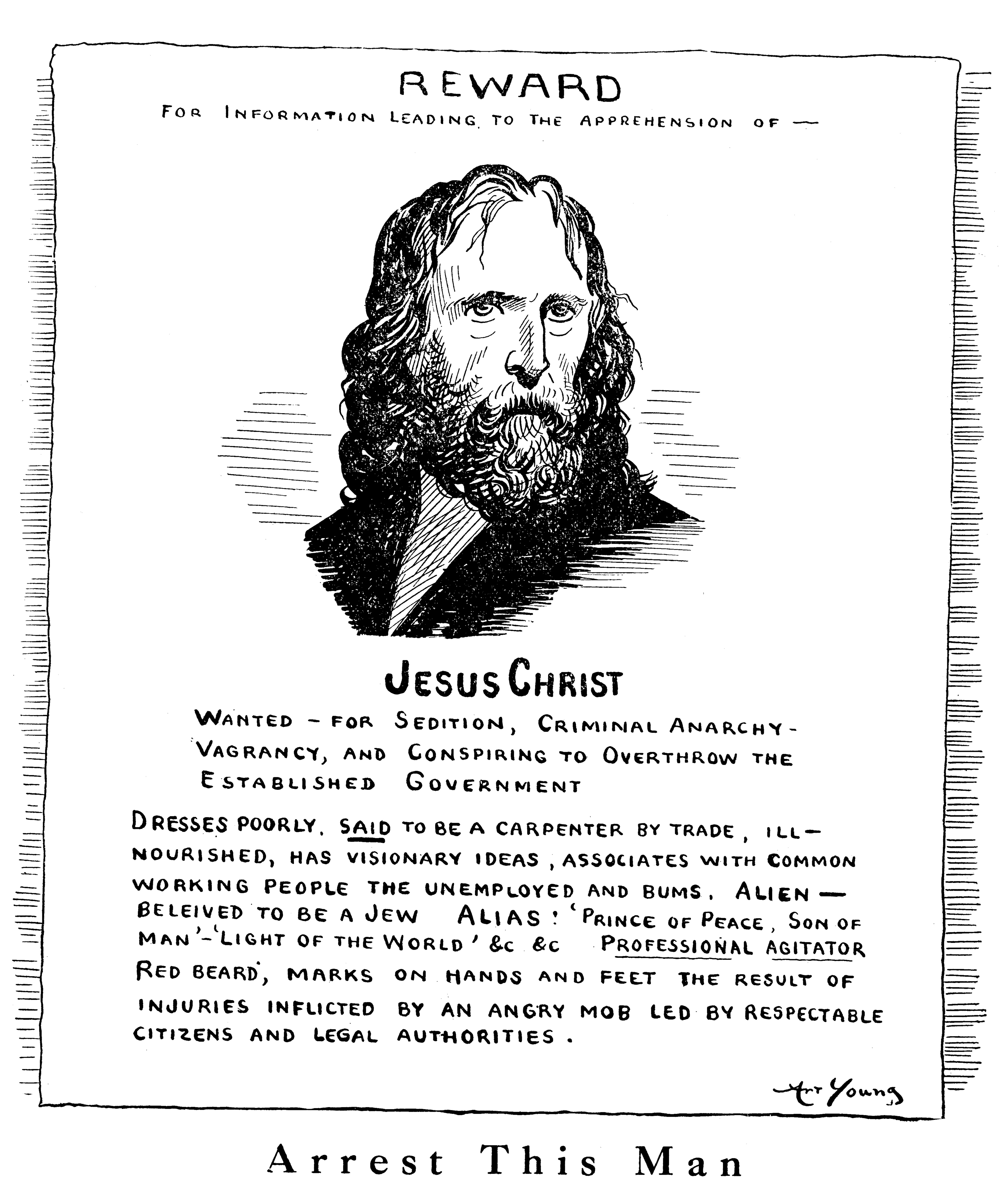
The Masses, 1917 political cartoon by socialist writer and cartoonist Art Young

Christian socialism is a religious and political philosophy that blends Christianity and socialism, endorsing socialist economics on the basis of the Bible and the teachings of Jesus. Many Christian socialists believe capitalism to be idolatrous and rooted in the sin of greed. Christian socialists identify the cause of social inequality to be the greed that they associate with capitalism. Christian socialism became a major movement in the United Kingdom beginning in the 19th century. Christians on the Left is one formal group, as well as a faction of the Labour Party.

According to the Encyclopædia Britannica, socialism is a "social and economic doctrine that calls for public rather than private ownership or control of property and natural resources. According to the socialist view, individuals do not live or work isolated, but live in cooperation with one another. Furthermore, everything that people produce is in some sense a social product, and everyone who contributes to the production of a good is entitled to a share in it. Society as a whole, therefore, should own or at least control property for the benefit of all its members. ... Early Christian communities also practised the sharing of goods and labour, a simple form of socialism subsequently followed in certain forms of monasticism. Several monastic orders continue these practices today."

The Hutterites believe in strict adherence to biblical principles and church discipline, and practices common ownership of nearly all property, resembling a form of communism to secular observers. In the words of historians Max Stanton and Rod Janzen, the Hutterites "established in their communities a rigorous system of Ordnungen, which were codes of rules and regulations that governed all aspects of life and ensured a unified perspective. As an economic system, Christian communism was attractive to many of the peasants who supported social revolution in sixteenth century central Europe", such as the German Peasants' War, and Friedrich Engels came to view Anabaptists as proto-communists.

Other earlier figures viewed as Christian socialists include the 19th-century writers F. D. Maurice (The Kingdom of Christ, 1838), John Malcolm Forbes Ludlow (The Christian Socialist, 1850), Adin Ballou (Practical Christian Socialism, 1854), Thomas Hughes (Tom Brown's School Days, 1857), John Ruskin (Unto This Last, 1862), Charles Kingsley (The Water-Babies, A Fairy Tale for a Land Baby, 1863), Frederick James Furnivall (co-creator of the Oxford English Dictionary), and Francis Bellamy (a Baptist minister and the author of the Pledge of Allegiance in the United States).

== History ==
=== Biblical age ===
Elements that would form the basis of Christian socialism are found in the Old Testament, as well as the New Testaments. They include Deuteronomy 15:1–5, Ezekiel 18:7, Isaiah 58:2–7, James 2:14, James 5:1–6, Job 31:16–25, 28, John 11:10–11, Leviticus 25: 35–38, Luke 4:18, Matthew 6:24, Matthew 19:23–24, Matthew 25:40–46, Proverbs 28:3–28, and Proverbs 31:9.

==== Old Testament ====
The Old Testament had divided perspectives on the issue of poverty. One part of the Biblical tradition held that poverty was judgment of God upon the wicked while viewing prosperity as a reward for the good, stating in the Proverbs 13:25 that "[t]he righteous have enough to satisfy their appetite, but the belly of the wicked is empty." There are other sections that instruct generosity to the have-nots of society. Mosaic Law instructs followers to treat neighbours equally and to be generous to have-nots.

You shall not oppress your neighbour ... but you shall love your neighbour as yourself: I am the Lord.

— Leviticus 19:13, 18

For the Lord your God is God of gods and Lord of lords, the great God, mighty and awesome, who shows no partiality and accepts no bribes. He defends the cause of the fatherless and the widow, and loves the foreigner residing among you, giving them food and clothing. And you are to love those who are foreigners, for you yourselves were foreigners in Egypt.

— Deuteronomy 10:17–19

When you reap in your harvest in the field, and have forgotten a sheaf in the field, you shall not go back to get it. ... When you beat your olive trees, you shall not go over the boughs again. ... When you gather the grapes of your vineyard, you shall not glean it afterward; it shall be for the sojourner, the fatherless and the widow. You shall remember that you were a slave in the land of Egypt; therefore I command you to do this.

— Deuteronomy 24:19–22

Some of the Psalms include many references to social justice for the poor.

Give justice to the weak and the fatherless; maintain the right of the afflicted and the destitute. Rescue the weak and the needy; deliver them from the hand of the wicked.

— Psalms 82 (81): 3, 4

Blessed is the man who fears the Lord, who greatly delights in his commandments! ... He has distributed freely, he has given to the poor; his righteousness endures forever; his horn is exalted in honour.

— Psalms 112 (111): 1, 9

Amos emphasizes the need for justice and righteousness that is described as conduct that emphasizes love for those who are poor and to oppose oppression and injustice towards the poor. The prophet Isaiah, to whom is attributed the Book of Isaiah, followed upon Amos' themes of justice and righteousness involving the poor as necessary for followers of God, denouncing those who do not do these things.

Even though you make many prayers, I will not listen; your hands are full of blood. ... [C]ease to do evil, learn to do good; seek justice, correct oppression; defend the fatherless, plead for the widow.

— Isaiah 1:15–17

The Book of Sirach, one of the deuterocanonical or biblical apocrypha books of the Old Testament, denounces the pursuit of wealth.

He who loves gold will not be justified, and he who pursues money will be led astray by it. Many have come to ruin because of gold, and their destruction has met them face to face. It is a stumbling block to those who are devoted to it, and every fool will be taken captive by it.

— Sirach 31: 5–7

==== New Testament ====
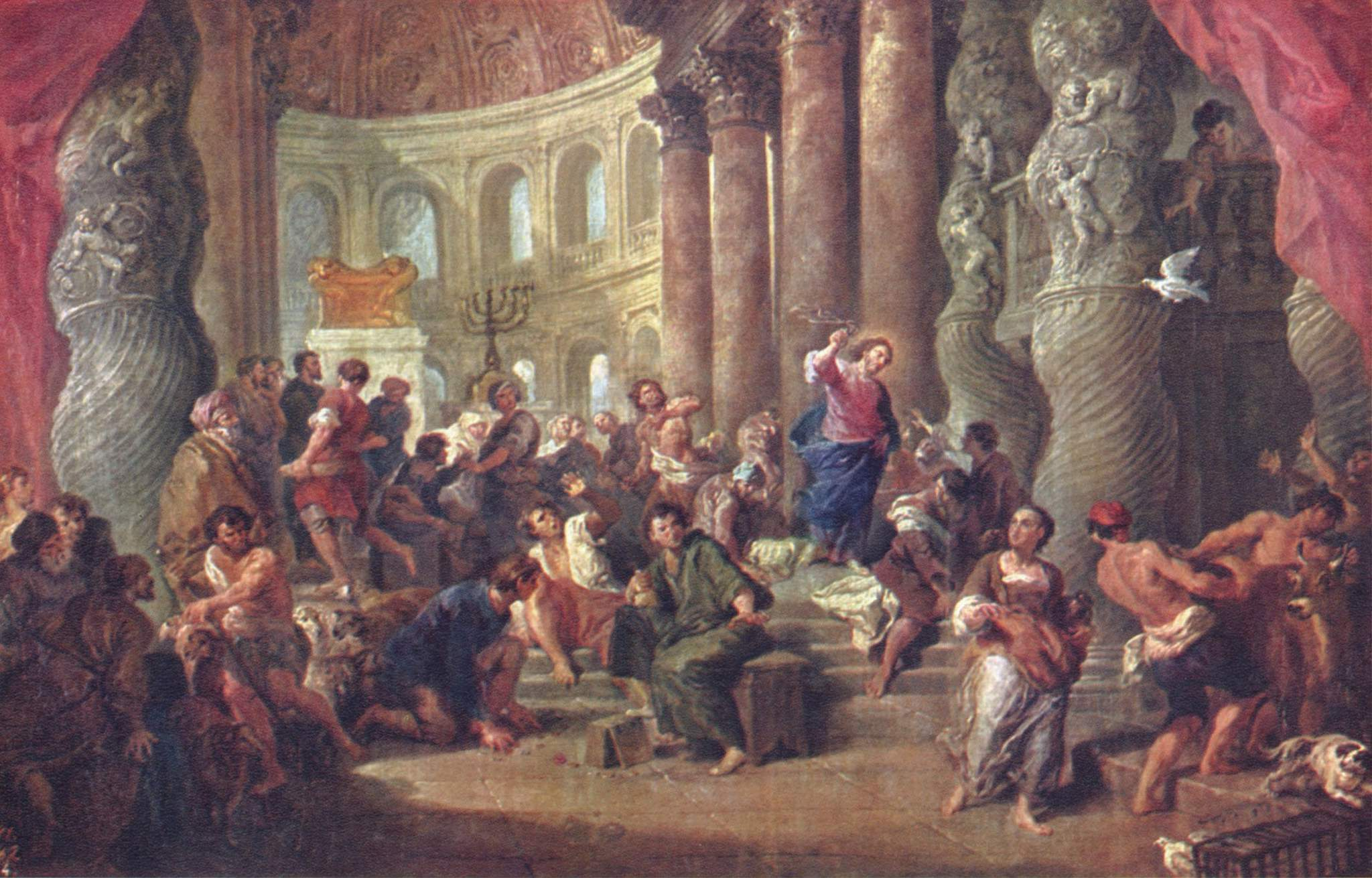
Jesus Expels the Moneylenders from the Temple by Giovanni Paolo Pannini, 1750

The teachings of Jesus are frequently described as socialist, especially by Christian socialists, such as Terry Eagleton. Acts 4:32 records that in the early church in Jerusalem "[n]o one claimed that any of their possessions was their own"; this pattern, which helped Christians survive after the siege of Jerusalem, was taken seriously for several centuries, and was an important factor in the rise of feudalism. While it would later disappear from church history except within monasticism, it experienced a revival since the 19th century. Christian socialism was one of the founding threads of the Labour Party in the United Kingdom and is said to begin with the uprising of Wat Tyler and John Ball in the 14th century.

In the New Testament, Jesus identifies himself with the hungry, the poor, the sick, and the prisoners. Matthew 25:31–46 is a major component of Christianity and is considered the cornerstone of Christian socialism. Another key statement in the New Testament that is an important component of Christian socialism is Luke 10:25–37 that follows the statement "You shall love your neighbour as yourself" with the question "And who is my neighbour?" In the Parable of the Good Samaritan. Jesus gives the response that the neighbour includes anyone in need, even people we might be expected to shun. The Samaritans and Jews claim descension from different Tribes of Israel, which had faced a schism prior to the events described in the New Testament. This schism led to interethnic and interreligious conflict between the two groups.

Luke 6:20–21 shows Jesus narrating the Sermon on the Plain. It reads: "Blessed are you poor, for yours is the kingdom of God. Blessed are you that hunger now, for you shall be satisfied." Christian socialists cite James the Just, the brother of Jesus, who criticizes the rich intensely and in strong language in the Epistle of James.

Come now, you rich, weep and howl for the miseries that are coming upon you. Your riches have rotted and your garments are moth-eaten. Your gold and silver have rusted, and their rust will be evidence against you and will eat your flesh like fire. You have laid up for treasure for the last days. Behold, the wages of the labourers who mowed your fields, which you have kept back by fraud, cry out; and the cries of the harvesters have reached the ears of the Lord of hosts. You have lived on the earth in luxury and in pleasure; you have fattened your hearts in a day of slaughter.

— James 5:1–6

During the New Testament period and beyond, there is evidence that many Christian communities practised forms of sharing, redistribution, and communism. Some of the Bible verses that inspired the communal economic arrangements of the Hutterites are found in the book of the Acts.

All the believers were together and had everything in common. Selling their possessions and goods, they gave to anyone as he had need.

— Acts 2, 44–45

All the believers were one in heart and mind. No one claimed that any of his possessions were his own, but they shared everything they had.

— Acts 4, 32

There were no needy persons among them. For from time to time those who owned lands or houses sold them, brought the money from their sales and put it at the apostles' feet, and it was distributed to anyone as he had need.

— Acts 4, 34–35

=== Church Fathers age ===
Basil of Caesarea, the Church Father of the Eastern monks who became Bishop of Caesarea, established a complex (later called Basileias) around the church and monastery that included hostels, almshouses, and hospitals for infectious diseases. During the great famine of 368, Basil denounced against profiteers and the indifferent rich. Basil wrote a sermon on the Parable of the Rich Fool in which he states:

"Who is the covetous man? One for whom plenty is not enough. Who is the defrauder? One who takes away what belongs to everyone. And are not you covetous, are you not a defrauder, when you keep for private use what you were given for distribution? When some one strips a man of his clothes we call him a thief. And one who might clothe the naked and does not—should not he be given the same name? The bread in your hoard belongs to the hungry; the cloak in your wardrobe belongs to the naked; the shoes you let rot belong to the barefoot; the money in your vaults belongs to the destitute. All you might help and do not—to all these you are doing wrong."

John Chrysostom declared his reasons for his attitude towards the rich and position of attitude towards wealth. He said:

"I am often reproached for continually attacking the rich. Yes, because the rich are continually attacking the poor. But those I attack are not the rich as such, only those who misuse their wealth. I point out constantly that those I accuse are not the rich, but the rapacious; wealth is one thing, covetousness another. Learn to distinguish."

=== Early modern period ===
During the English Civil War and the period of the Commonwealth of England (1642–1660), the Diggers espoused a political and economic theory rooted in Christianity that bears a strong resemblance to modern socialism, particularly its anarchist and communist strains. Some scholars believe the Munster Rebellion may have formed an early socialist state.

=== 19th century to present ===
In "Religion and the Rise of Socialism", historian Eric Hobsbawn argued that the "modern working-class socialist movement has developed an overwhelmingly secular, indeed often militantly anti-religious ideology." At the same time, he and other historians cited examples where this was not the case, particularly Britain in the 19th and 20th centuries, where E. P. Thompson and Stephen Yo said a form of ethical socialism dominated the labour movement. A prominent example of Christian socialism, or socialist Christianity, was Keir Hardie, a founder of the Labour Party in Britain, who said he learnt his "Socialism in the New Testament", where he said he found what he described as his "chief inspiration". Those socialists argued that socialism was the embodiment of the teachings of Jesus, and that it would also rescue the church from Mammon, which they said caused it to have lost its way and become corrupt by siding with the rich and powerful against the poor. According to this view, socialism was not anti-religion but was opposed to those who would use it to support capitalism and the status quo. James Connolly is credited with setting the groundwork for Christian socialism in Ireland. Connolly, who wrote a story for the Christian socialist journal Labour Prophet, said: "It is not Socialism but Capitalism that is opposed to religion ... when the organised Socialist working class tramples upon the Capitalist Class it will not be trampling on a pillar of God's Church but upon a blasphemous defiler of the Sanctuary, it will be rescuing the faith from the impious vermin who make it noisome to the really religious men and women."

In France, Philippe Buchez began to characterize his philosophy as Christian socialism in the 1820s and 1830s. A variety of socialist perspectives emerged in 19th-century Britain, beginning with John Ruskin. Edward R. Norman identifies what he describes as the three "immediate intellectual sources" for mid-century Christian socialism: Samuel Taylor Coleridge, Thomas Carlyle, and Thomas Arnold. The United States also has a Christian socialist tradition. In Utah, it developed and flourished in the first part of the 20th century, playing an important part in the development and expression of radicalism. Part of a larger, nationwide movement in many American Protestant churches, Christian socialism in Utah was particularly strong, and dedicated Christian socialist ministers, such as Episcopal Church bishop Franklin Spencer Spalding of Utah and Congregational minister Myron W. Reed in the American West, were fierce advocates for the miners laboring in the Mountain states.

==== John Ruskin ====
The influential Victorian era art critic John Ruskin expounded theories about social justice in Unto This Last (1860). In it, he stated four goals that might be called socialist even though Ruskin did not use the term.

1. "[T]raining schools for youth, established at government cost."
2. In connection with these schools, the government should establish "manufactories and workshops, for the production and sale of every necessary of life."
3. All unemployed people should be "set to work" or trained for work if needed or forced to work if necessary.
4. "[F]or the old and destitute, comfort and home should be provided."

Although Norman says Ruskin was not "an authentic Socialist in any of its various nineteenth-century meanings", as his only real contact with the Christian socialists came through the Working Men's College, he influenced later socialist thinking, especially the artist William Morris.

==== Artists ====
The painters of the Pre-Raphaelite Brotherhood were influenced and sponsored by Ruskin. Morris was a leader of the Socialist League founded in December 1884.

==== Fabian Society ====
The Fabian Society was founded in 1884, with Beatrice Webb and Sydney Webb being among its leading members. The Fabians influenced members of the Bloomsbury Group and were important in the early history of the Labour Party in the United Kingdom.

===== Episcopal Church Socialist League and Church League for Industrial Democracy =====
Founded by Vida Dutton Scudder in 1911, herself influenced by the Fabian Society, the Episcopal Church Socialist League and its successor, the Church League for Industrial Democracy, sought to ally Christian doctrine with the plight of the working class as a part of the larger social gospel movement that was taking hold of many urban churches across the United States in the early 20th century.

In the November 1914 issue of The Christian Socialist, Spalding stated:

"The Christian Church exists for the sole purpose of saving the human race. So far she has failed, but I think that Socialism shows her how she may succeed. It insists that men cannot be made right until the material conditions be made right. Although man cannot live by bread alone, he must have bread. Therefore, the Church must destroy a system of society which inevitably creates and perpetuates unequal and unfair conditions of life. These unequal and unfair conditions have been created by competition. Therefore competition must cease and cooperation take its place."

==== Christian anarchism ====
Although anarchists have traditionally been skeptical of or vehemently opposed to organized religion, some anarchists have provided religious interpretations and approaches to anarchism, including the idea that glorification of the state is a form of sinful idolatry. Christian anarchists say anarchism is inherent in Christianity and the Gospels, that it is grounded in the belief that there is only one source of authority to which Christians are ultimately answerable—the authority of God as embodied in the teachings of Jesus. It therefore rejects the idea that human governments have ultimate authority over human societies. Christian anarchists denounce the state, believing it is violent, deceitful, and idolatrous when glorified.

The foundation of Christian anarchism is a rejection of violence, with Leo Tolstoy's The Kingdom of God Is Within You regarded as a key text. Tolstoy sought to separate Russian Orthodox Christianity—which was merged with the state—from what he believed was the true message of Jesus as contained in the Gospels, specifically in the Sermon on the Mount. Tolstoy takes the Christian pacifist viewpoint that all governments who wage war, and churches who in turn support those governments, are an affront to the Christian principles of nonviolence and nonresistance. Although Tolstoy never used Christian anarchism in The Kingdom of God Is Within You, reviews of this book following its publication in 1894 appear to have coined the term.

Christian anarchists hold that the Reign of God is the proper expression of the relationship between God and humanity. Under the Reign of God, human relationships would be characterized by divided authority, servant leadership, and universal compassion—not by the hierarchical, authoritarian structures that are normally attributed to religious social order. Most Christian anarchists are pacifists who reject war and the use of violence. More than any other Bible source, the Sermon on the Mount is used as the basis for Christian anarchism. Tolstoy's The Kingdom of God Is Within You is often regarded as a key text for modern Christian anarchism.

Critics of Christian anarchism include both Christians and anarchists. Christians often cite Romans 13 as evidence that the state should be obeyed, while secular anarchists do not believe in any authority including God as per the slogan "no gods, no masters". Christian anarchists often believe Romans 13 is taken out of context, emphasizing that Revelation 13 and Isaiah 13, among other passages, are needed to fully understand Romans 13 text.

==== Christian communism ====
Christian communism is a form of religious communism based on Christianity and the view that the teachings of Jesus compel Christians to support communism as the ideal social system. While there is no universal agreement on the exact date when Christian communism was founded, Christian communists say that evidence from the Bible suggests that the first Christians, including the Apostles in the New Testament as described in the Acts, established their own communist society in the years following Jesus' death and resurrection.

Advocates of Christian communism, including other communists, such as Karl Marx, Friedrich Engels, and Karl Kautsky, argue that it was taught by Jesus and practised by the apostles themselves. This is generally agreed by historians. The link was highlighted in one of Marx's early writings, which stated that "[a]s Christ is the intermediary unto whom man unburdens all his divinity, all his religious bonds, so the state is the mediator unto which he transfers all his Godlessness, all his human liberty."

==== Christian democracy ====
The political movement of Christian democracy espouses some values of Christian socialism in the form of economic justice and social welfare. It opposes an individualist worldview and approves state intervention in the economy in defence of human dignity. Because of its close association with Catholicism, Christian democracy differs from Christian socialism by its emphasis on traditional church and family values, its defence of private property, and by its opposition to excessive state intervention.

Salvatore Talamo, a neo-Thomistic sociologist and Catholic social theorist, when distinguishing between the conservative and Christian democratic views on labour issues, used Christian Socialists for the latter; most Christian democrats avoid using socialism, which is occasionally mainly used by conservatives who attempt to discredit their Christian democratic opponents by using a word with Marxist connotations. Christian democratic parties under various names were formed in Europe and Latin America after World War II. Some, such as in Germany and Italy, became a major political force.

==== Liberation theology ====
Liberation theology is a synthesis of Christian theology and socio-economic analyses that emphasizes "social concern for the poor and political liberation for oppressed peoples", as well as "the oppressed and maimed and blind and lame", and bring the "good news to the poor". Beginning in the 1960s after the Second Vatican Council, it became the political praxis of Latin American liberation theologians, such as Gustavo Gutiérrez, Leonardo Boff, and Jesuits like Juan Luis Segundo and Jon Sobrino, who popularized the phrase "preferential option for the poor". This expression was used first by Jesuit Father General Pedro Arrupe in 1968, and the World Synod of Catholic Bishops in 1971 chose as its theme "Justice in the World" for the Second Ordinary General Assembly of the Synod of Bishops.

The Latin American context produced evangelical advocates of liberation theology, such as Rubem Alves, José Míguez Bonino, and C. René Padilla, who called for integral mission in the 1970s, emphasizing evangelism and social responsibility. Theologies of liberation have developed in other parts of the world, such as black theology in the United States and South Africa, Palestinian liberation theology, Dalit theology in India, and Minjung theology in South Korea.

== In Catholicism ==
Communism and socialism have been condemned by Pope Pius IX, Pope Leo XIII, Pope Pius X, Pope Benedict XV, Pope Pius XI, Pope Pius XII, Pope John XXIII, Pope Paul VI, and Pope John Paul II. Many of these popes, Leo XIII and Pius XI in particular, have also condemned laissez-faire capitalism. Pope Benedict XVI condemned both ideologies, while distinguishing them from democratic socialism, which he praised. The views of Pope Francis on the issue have also been called into question, with some arguing he held socialist or communist views, while others argue he did not. Pope Francis had denied accusations of him being a communist, including by The Economist, calling them a "misinterpretation" of his views. In 2016, Francis criticized Marxist ideology as wrong but praised communists for "[thinking] like Christians".

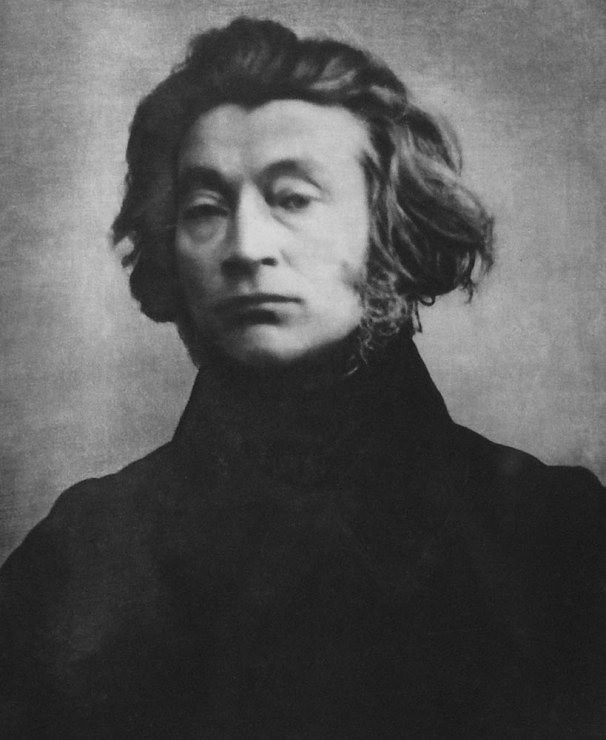
Political views of famous Polish poet Adam Mickiewicz included visible elements of Christian socialism

=== 19th century ===
Pope Pius IX criticized socialism in his works Nostis et nobiscum and Quanta cura. In his 1849 work Nostis et nobiscum, he referred to communism and socialism as "wicked theories" that confuse people with what he called "perverted teachings". In his 1864 work Quanta cura, he referred to communism and socialism as a "fatal error". Communism was later further criticized in the 1878 papal encyclical Quod apostolici muneris, by Pope Leo XIII, as he believed that it led to state domination over the freedom of the individual and quelled proper religious worship, inherently turning the top hierarchical power over to the state instead of God. Leo said in this work that socialists steal "the very Gospel itself with a view to deceive more easily the unwary ... [and] distort it so as to suit their own purposes." In the words of academic Catherine Ruth Pakaluk, who refers to the reigns of Pope Pius IX to Pope Pius XII (1850–1950) as the Leonine era, "socialism and communism appear so often in the papal texts of the Leonine era, and with such importance, that they might be described as central foils over and against which the Church is defined and refined over time."

In his 1891 encyclical Rerum novarum, Pope Leo XIII said that socialism acts against natural injustice and destroys the home. He wrote that materialist socialism "must be utterly rejected" by Catholics. Leo XIII strongly criticized capitalism. According to historian Eamon Duffy, it was revolutionary in that, as recounted by theologian Paul Misner, up until that point, the Vatican was allied with reactionary institutions and monarchies, and it was the first major statement of the old institutions to discuss the realities of 19th-century society and endorse the working class's grievances. In the words of Duffy, "For the successor of Pio Nono to say these things ... was truly revolutionary. Leo's attack on unrestricted capitalism, his insistence on the duty of state intervention on behalf of the worker, his assertion of the right to a living wage and the rights of organised labour, changed the terms of all future Catholic discussions on social questions, and gave weight and authority to more adventurous advocates of Social Catholicism."

Many Catholics and non-Catholics used the Christian socialists label for those who wanted to put Rerum novarum into practice. The Knights of Saint Columbanus can trace its origins back to Rerum novarum. The labour movement in Ireland and the United States traces its origins back to Roman Catholicism and the 1891 encyclical Rerum novarum and the various subsequent encyclicals it spawned. The Starry Plough, a symbol associated with socialism in Ireland, was designed with an explicit reference to Catholicism in mind. The right to association, such as the creation of and involvement in trade unions and co-operatives, are regarded as a core part of Roman Catholic social teaching.

=== 20th century ===
In 1901, Leo XIII in his encyclical Graves de communi re referred to socialism as a "harvest of misery". In 1910, Pope Pius X criticized socialism in his Apostolic letter Notre charge apostolique, predicting that the rise of socialism will be "a tumultuous agitation". In 1914, Pope Benedict XV wrote his encyclical, Ad beatissimi Apostolorum, which reaffirmed the anti-socialist stance of the Catholic Church, calling on Catholics to remember "the errors of Socialism and of similar doctrines", as taught by his predecessors.

In 1931, Pope Pius XI wrote his work Quadragesimo anno, wherein Pius described the major dangers for human freedom and dignity arising from unrestrained capitalism and totalitarian communism. Pius XI called upon true socialism to distance itself from totalitarian communism as a matter of clarity and also as a matter of principle. Communists were accused of attempting to overthrow all existing civil society. It was argued that Christian socialism, if allied to communism, was deemed to be an oxymoron because of this. At the time, Pius XI famously wrote: "Religious socialism, Christian socialism, are contradictory terms; no one can be at the same time a good Catholic and a true socialist."

Some prominent Catholic socialists existed during Pope Pius XI's era, including the American anarchist Dorothy Day who advocated for distributism and the Irish priest Michael O'Flanagan who was suspended for his political beliefs. In 1931, it was clarified that a Catholic was free to vote for the Labour Party, the British affiliate of the Socialist International. Later in 1937, Pius XI rejected atheistic communism in an encyclical entitled Divini Redemptoris as "a system full of errors and sophisms", with a "pseudo-ideal of justice, equality, and fraternity" and "a certain false mysticism", and contrasted it with a humane society (civitas humana).

In 1949, Pope Pius XII issued the Decree against Communism, which declared Catholics who professed communist doctrine to be excommunicated as apostates from the Christian faith. In 1952, when referring to socialism, Pius XII stated: "The Church will fight this battle to the end, for it is a question of supreme values: the dignity of man and the salvation of souls." In 1959, the Holy Office was asked if it is permitted for Catholics to vote for parties or candidates "who, even if they do not profess principles contrary to Catholic doctrine and, indeed, also claim for themselves the name Christian, nevertheless, in reality, associate themselves with the Communists and support them with their course of action". The response, affirmed by Pope John XXIII, was: "No, according to the directive of the Decree of the Holy Office of July 1, 1949, no." (Decree against Communism). This extended the Degree against Communism to Italian socialist parties, although the same year La Civiltà Cattolica wrote that collaboration with non-Marxist socialists may be permissible. On 15 May 1961, John XXIII promulgated the encyclical Mater et magistra, which reaffirmed the Church's anti-socialist stances. John XXIII wrote:

"Pope Pius XI further emphasized the fundamental opposition between Communism and Christianity, and made it clear that no Catholic could subscribe even to moderate Socialism. The reason is that Socialism is founded on a doctrine of human society which is bounded by time and takes no account of any objective other than that of material well-being. Since, therefore, it proposes a form of social organization which aims solely at production, it places too severe a restraint on human liberty, at the same time flouting the true notion of social authority."

Nonetheless, Pope John XXIII helped the Christian Democracy party to cooperate with the Italian Socialist Party, as part of the Catholic open up to the left.

In Chile, many Catholics supported the democratic president Salvador Allende, and a group of Catholic priests and faithful founded the group Christians for Socialism, which supported the president and argued that socialism is closer to Catholic values than capitalism. In a meeting organized by the group in April 1972 attended by over 400 Catholic priests and nuns, the participants issued a declaration calling for official Catholic support for socialism, argued that Christians are obliged to involve themselves in the revolutionary process, and called for class struggle. The group also cited the words of Chilean papal prelate Raúl Silva Henríquez, who stated: "There are more of the Gospel's values in socialism than there are in capitalism." In May 1971, Chilean bishops released a pastoral letter "The Gospel, Politics, and Socialisms" (Spanish: Evangelio, politica, y socialismos), which stated that while the Catholic Church could not endorse a specific political ideology, socialism is not incompatible with Catholic teaching and might be seen as a direct application of Catholic principles. At the same time, Chilean bishops warned that Catholics must reject variants of socialism that are based on atheism or a materialistic view of history, as these were elements incompatible with the teaching of the Church.

In 1971, Pope Paul VI wrote the Apostolic Letter, Octogesima adveniens. About Christians and socialism, he wrote: "Too often Christians attracted by socialism tend to idealize it in terms which, apart from anything else, are very general: a will for justice, solidarity and equality. They refuse to recognize the limitations of the historical socialist movements, which remain conditioned by the ideologies from which they originated." Pope John Paul II criticized socialism in his 1991 encyclical Centesimus annus. He wrote:

"The fundamental error of socialism is anthropological in nature. Socialism considers the individual person simply as an element, a molecule within the social organism, so that the good of the individual is completely subordinated to the functioning of the socio-economic mechanism. Socialism likewise maintains that the good of the individual can be realized without reference to his free choice, to the unique and exclusive responsibility which he exercises in the face of good or evil. Man is thus reduced to a series of social relationships, and the concept of the person as the autonomous subject of moral decision disappears, the very subject whose decisions build the social order. From this mistaken conception of the person there arise both a distortion of law, which defines the sphere of the exercise of freedom, and an opposition to private property. A person who is deprived of something he can call 'his own', and of the possibility of earning a living through his own initiative, comes to depend on the social machine and on those who control it. This makes it much more difficult for him to recognize his dignity as a person, and hinders progress towards the building up of an authentic human community."

The 1992 Catechism of the Catholic Church, also promulgated by Pope John Paul II, condemns socialism as an atheistic ideology. Paragraph 2425 states:

"The Church has rejected the totalitarian and atheistic ideologies associated in modem times with 'communism' or 'socialism.' She has likewise refused to accept, in the practice of 'capitalism,' individualism and the absolute primacy of the law of the marketplace over human labor. Regulating the economy solely by centralized planning perverts the basis of social bonds; regulating it solely by the law of the marketplace fails social justice, for 'there are many human needs which cannot be satisfied by the market.' Reasonable regulation of the marketplace and economic initiatives, in keeping with a just hierarchy of values and a view to the common good, is to be commended."

==== In Hungary ====
In Hungary, the Christian socialist movement grew not as a left-wing manifestation of Christian values but rather as an anti-Jewish, monarchist, and conspiratorial right-wing alternative to liberal capitalism.

The Catholic People's Party was the first Christian socialist party founded in Hungary, then a part of the Austro-Hungarian Empire, by Catholic priest and Bishop of Székesfehérvár Ottokár Prohászka, a prolific antisemitic writer who wrote multiple books promoting antisemitic conspiracy theories. Prohászka proclaimed his values to be based upon the Rerum novarum of Pope Leo XIII and his belief in anti-Judaism (which he insisted was sectarian and thus supposedly different from the race-based antisemitism) and economic antisemitism, blaming the Jews for bringing capitalism and liberalism to Hungary. His anti-Jewish/antisemitic writings were so prolific that Hungarian historian Béla Bodó called him "one of the founders of political antisemitism in Hungary." The party mostly gained traction among wealthier peasants and the bourgeoisie. This party would remain the dominant voice not only of Catholic reactionary politics but also Christian socialism in the Kingdom of Hungary and would last until the dissolution of Austria-Hungary after the Aster Revolution, forever shaping the notion of what Christian socialism was in Hungary.

During the revolutions and interventions in Hungary following World War I, Hungary went from a democratic republic to a communist state, and back to a democratic republic until ultimately being overthrown in a Romanian-backed coup which brought the old monarchist establishment back into power. During this time, legitimists of the Habsburg dynasty formed the powerful Christian National Union Party (or KNEP for short) under István Friedrich out of former remnants of the Catholic People's Party of Austria-Hungary. Similar to the older party, it professed loyalty to the House of Habsburg, Catholic clericalism, a pro-German foreign policy, and rabid Jew-baiting, with a similar base of wealthy peasants and the bourgeoisie. Initially accepting the regency under Miklós Horthy and participating in the 1920 Hungarian parliamentary election, the KNEP eventually turned on Horthy and backed Charles IV of Hungary's attempts to retake the throne. But this attempt failed, leading to the party's marginalization from Hungarian politics.

=== 21st century ===
In 2004, Joseph Ratzinger, the future Pope Benedict XVI, addressed the Italian Senate, declaring that "[i]n many respects democratic socialism was and is close to Catholic social doctrine; in any case, it contributed toward the formation of a social consciousness." In 2005, Benedict XVI in his encyclical Deus caritas est stated: "We do not need a State which regulates and controls everything, but a State which, in accordance with the principle of subsidiarity, generously acknowledges and supports initiatives arising from the different social forces and combines spontaneity with closeness to those in need. The Church is one of those living forces. ... In the end, the claim that just social structures would make works of charity superfluous masks a materialist conception of man ... a conviction that demeans man and ultimately disregards all that is specifically human." In 2007, Benedict XVI criticized Karl Marx in his encyclical Spe salvi, stating that "[w]ith the victory of the revolution, though, Marx's fundamental error also became evident. He showed precisely how to overthrow the existing order, but he did not say how matters should proceed thereafter. ... He forgot that freedom always remains also freedom for evil. He thought that once the economy had been put right, everything would automatically be put right. His real error is materialism: man, in fact, is not merely the product of economic conditions, and it is not possible to redeem him purely from the outside by creating a favourable economic environment."

Pope Francis has been viewed as having some sympathy to socialist causes, with his frequent criticism of capitalism and of neoliberalism. In 2016, Francis said that the world economy is "[f]undamental terrorism, against all of Humanity", and that "[i]f anything, it is the communists who think like Christians. Christ spoke of a society where the poor, the weak and the marginalized have the right to decide." When later questioned on whether or not he is a communist, Francis responded: "As for whether or not I'm a communist: I am sure that I have not said anything more than what the Church's social doctrine teaches ... maybe the impression of being a little more 'of the left' has been given, but that would be a misinterpretation." In 2013, he said: "The ideology of Marxism is wrong. But I have met many Marxists in my life who are good people, so I don't feel offended."

Movements like liberation theology argue for the compatibility of socialism and Catholicism; they have been rejected by Pope John Paul II and Pope Benedict XVI. António Guterres, a practicing Catholic and Secretary-General of the United Nations since 2017, is the immediate past president of the Socialist International.

== In Calvinism ==
=== Australia ===
In Australia, the academic Roland Boer has attempted to synthesize Calvinism and Marxism. In a 2010 interview, he stated that "it became clear to me that within Christianity there is a strong tradition of political and theological radicalism, which I continued to explore personally. Reformed or Calvinist theology did not seem to sit easily with that interest, so I spent many a long year rejecting that tradition, only to realise later that Calvin himself was torn between the radical potential of elements in the Bible and his own conservative preferences."

=== France ===
In France, the birthplace of Calvinism, the Christianisme Social (Social Christianity) movement emerged in the 1870s from the preaching of Tommy Fallot. Early on, the movement focused on such issues as illiteracy and alcoholism amongst the poor. After the First World War, Social Christianity moved in two directions—towards pacifism and towards ecumenism. Within the movement emerged conscientious objectors, such as Jacques Martin, Philo Vernier, and Henri Roser, economists pursuing policies that reflected cooperation and solidarity, such as Bernard Lavergne and Georges Lasserre, and theologians like Paul Ricoeur. One of the pastors in the movement, Jacques Kaltenbach, was also to have a formative influence on André Trocmé.

Under the Vichy regime, which had seen the emergence of other forms of witness, particularly the support of internees in the camps and aiding Jews to escape, the movement was reborn to tackle the problems of a changing world. It expressed a Christian socialism, more or less in line with the beginning of a new political left. Political activism was very broad and included the denunciation of torture, East–West debate on European integration and taking a stance on the process of decolonization. It facilitated meetings between employers, managers, and trade unionists to discern a new economic order. After the events of May 68, Calvinism in France became much more left-wing in its orientation.

One doctrinal text produced in the 1960s, Church and Authorities, was described as Marxist in its orientation. Churches now seized for themselves the political and social issues to tackle, such as nuclear power and justice for the Third World. In the early 2000s, the Social Christianity movement temporarily discontinued and its journal Other Times ceased to be published. The movement was relaunched on 10 June 2010 with a petition signed by over 240 people, and now maintains an active presence with its own website. Economically, most Calvinists have supported capitalism and have been in the vanguard of promoting free-market capitalism, and have produced many of France's leading entrepreneurs. With regard to politics and social issues, they are socialists. Three of France's post-war prime ministers have been Calvinists, despite Protestants only making up two percent of the population. Two of these prime ministers have been socialists.

=== Germany ===
In 1899, the well-known Protestant theologians Christoph Blumhardt, a Pietist, and in 1900 Paul Göhre, a liberal, independently joined the Social Democratic Party. Thus, a movement began to emerge that found its expression and form in religious socialism. From the very beginning, religious socialists came from a wide variety of theological camps across the Jewish-Christian spectrum. In Germany, one of the hallmarks of religious socialism was that it did not create a new theological movement. After World War I, groups of religious socialists formed in Baden, Thuringia, the Rhineland, and northern Germany. In December 1919, the first organization, called the League of Religious Socialists, was founded in Berlin, and others soon followed. In 1924, these regional associations merged to form a working group, and in 1926, the League of Religious Socialists of Germany (BRSD) was created. This group still exists today.

=== Wales ===
In Wales, Calvinistic Methodism is the largest non-conformist religion. Its beginnings may be traced to Griffith Jones (1684–1761), of Llanddowror, Carmarthenshire, whose sympathy for the poor led him to set on foot a system of circulating charity schools for the education of children. Until the 19th century, the prevailing thought amongst Welsh non-conformists was that "it would be wiser if the churches limited their activities to those of the altar and not to meddle at all with the state and social questions." This stemmed partly from the traditional nonconformist belief in the separation of church and state.

In his influential sermon Y Ddwy Alwedigaeth (The Two Vocations), Emrys ap Iwan challenged this passive pietism. He wrote: "We must not think, like the old Methodists, Puritans and some Catholics, that we can only seek Godliness outside our earthly vocation." He condemned those Christians who limited godliness to directly religious matters such as Sabbath observance and personal devotion. He declared that all earthly things, including language and culture, have some kind of divine origin. Many of the founders of the Welsh nationalist social-democratic party, Plaid Cymru, were also Calvinists, including John Edward Daniel. Daniel was the theologian credited for bringing neo-orthodoxy to Wales. Daniel argued that God did not create man as an isolated individual but as a social being. The second generation of Plaid Cymru leaders included R. Tudur Jones. His political stance, combined with Calvinist doctrine, created an integrated vision that was significant to the religious life of Christian Wales in the later half of the 20th century. Jones argued that the "state should be a servant, to preserve order and to allow men to live the good life."

The Calvinist tradition in Plaid Cymru influenced its non-violent approach. According to Rhys Llwyd, "[t]he ideal is no fist violence, no verbal violence, and no heart violence. ... Christians ... point to the New Testament example of Jesus Christ clearing the temple. Here there is no suggestion of violence against people; rather the tables are turned as a symbolic act. The life and teaching of Jesus Christ were seen as the foundations of nonviolent direct action [for Plaid Cymru members] ... loving their enemies on the one hand, but not compromising on what they saw as an issue of moral rightness." Plaid Cymru continues to see itself as very much part of the Christian pacifist tradition.

== In Methodism ==
Christian Socialism found a prominent home within Methodism, stemming directly from the social ethos established by founder John Wesley, who vigorously championed social justice causes such as prison reform and the abolition of slavery. In the United Kingdom, Methodists were notably active in the formation of the early Labour movement and the Labour Party is often cited as owing more to Methodism's social conscience than to Marxist ideology. Influential figures like the Methodist minister and Labour peer Donald Soper advocated Christian Socialist principles, linking the religious call for social holiness to systemic reform. This commitment is rooted in the belief that the Christian gospel demands a challenge to economic systems like unrestrained capitalism, which many Christian socialists find to be rooted in greed and incompatible with the principles of human dignity and collective responsibility. This history of social activism continues to influence contemporary Methodist churches, which often emphasize a mandate for social justice and advocate for government responsibility in ensuring basic human rights and welfare.

== Notable Christian socialist people and groups ==
Notable followers of Christian socialism include:

- John Archer, New Zealand politician. He was a former mayor of Christchurch and president of the New Zealand Labour Party.
- Adin Ballou, American proponent of Christian nonresistance. He was a socialist within the Christian anarchist tradition.
- Francis Bellamy, American Baptist minister. He was the original author of the Pledge of Allegiance.
- Tony Benn, British politician. He was a parliamentarian and campaigner for Britain's Labour Party.
- William Dwight Porter Bliss, American Episcopal Church priest. He was also a writer, editor, and socialist activist.
- Sergei Bulgakov, Russian priest, philosopher, and economist. He was a Russian Orthodox Christian theologian.
- Hélder Câmara, Brazilian bishop. A self-identified socialist, he was part of the Roman Catholic Archdiocese of Olinda e Recife.
- Hugo Chávez, former President of Venezuela. He linked socialism and the teachings of Jesus.
- Percy Dearmer, English priest and liturgist. He was a lifelong socialist.
- Tommy Douglas, Canadian politician and Baptist minister. He was the premier of Saskatchewan.
- Marion Howard Dunham, American teacher, activist, and suffragist. She was corresponding secretary of the Women's National Socialist Union.
- Frederick James Furnivall, English philologist. He is one of the co-creators of the New English Dictionary.
- William Gadsby, English Strict Baptist pastor and hymn writer and church planter.
- Barry Gardiner, British politician and member of the Labour Party. He identifies as a Christian democratic socialist.
- David Bentley Hart, American Eastern Orthodox Church philosophical theologian. He identifies with the European Christian socialist tradition.
- Thomas Hughes, English lawyer and judge. He was also a politician and author within the Victorian era.
- Hewlett Johnson, English Anglican priest. The author of The Socialist Sixth of the World (1939) and Soviet Russia Since the War (1947), he was known as "The Red Dean of Canterbury".
- Martin Luther King Jr., American Baptist minister. He was also a civil rights activist.
- Charles Kingsley, English university professor, social reformer, historian, novelist, and poet, who was a broad church priest of the Church of England. He is a founder of Christian socialism.
- Kenneth Leech, English Anglican priest and theologian. He is one of the founders of the Jubilee Group, a network of Christian socialists.
- Keir Hardie, Scottish politician and trade unionist. He was one of the founders of Britain's Labour Party and Christian socialist movement.
- John Malcolm Forbes Ludlow, Anglo-Indian barrister. He led the Christian socialist movement and founded its newspaper of the same name.
- F. D. Maurice, English Anglican theologian. He was also a prolific author and one of the founders of Christian socialism.
- Adam Mickiewicz, Polish romanticist poet.
- Walter Nash, New Zealand politician. He is a former Prime Minister of New Zealand and leader of the New Zealand Labour Party.
- Myron W. Reed, American lawyer, Congregationalist minister, and political activist. He was a leading voice of the social gospel movement in the American West.
- Kevin Rudd, Australian politician. He is a former Prime Minister of Australia and leader of the Australian Labor Party.
- John Ruskin, English writer and philosopher of the Victorian era. His work had a profound effect and was reprinted by the Christian socialist founders of the Working Men's College and William Morris.
- Amir Sjarifuddin, Indonesian political activist. He was the second Prime Minister of Indonesia from 1947 until 1948 and was implicated in the Madiun Affair of 1948.
- Sun Yat-sen, Chinese revolutionary and first president of the Provisional Government of the Republic of China. Sun was a lifelong Christian who posited socialism as the ideal method for modernizing and re-strengthening China's economy.
- R. H. Tawney, English philosopher. He is identified as an ethical socialist who believed Christianity was the basis of a new morality that secular expression in social democracy.
- Tetsu Katayama, Japanese politician. He is a former Prime Minister of Japan for the Japan Socialist Party.
- Desmond Tutu, South African theologian. He was the former Anglican Archbishop of Cape Town.
- Harry F. Ward, English-born American Methodist minister. He was also a political activist who identified himself with the Christian socialist movement.
- Ivan Prokhanov, Russian, Soviet, and émigré religious figure, engineer, poet, preacher, theologian, and politician.
- Jim Jones, American cult leader. He established the Peoples Temple that fuses elements of Christianity with communist and socialist ideology. He is associated with the Jonestown massacre. According to number of authorities, such as John R. Hall, David Chidester, and Eileen Barker, Jones had become delusional and immoral but remained able to plan and orchestrate events.

Notable Christian socialist groups and parties include:

- Agricultural People's Front of Peru (Peru)
- Christian Democracy (Greece)
- Christians on the Left (United Kingdom)
- Christian Social Party (Netherlands)
- Christian Social Party (Switzerland)
- Citizen Left (Chile)
- Democratic Party factions (Italy)
- Labour Party factions (United Kingdom)
- League of Christian Socialists (Netherlands)
- Sandinista National Liberation Front (Nicaragua)
- Le Sillon (France)
- Social Democratic Party (Romania)
- Young Republic League (France)

== Reception ==
In Britain, Christian socialism is viewed positively by many different backgrounds, ranging from Nonconformists to Roman Catholic, particularly Anglo-Catholic Ritualism. It is viewed critically by some socialists, who reject it as utopian socialism and for its methodology, and by some religious figures and popes, who rejected socialism's compatibility with Christianity due to its perceived atheism and materialism. Continental Reformed Protestant pastor Henri Nick defended it, saying: "It is not socialism that I would criticise, but atheism falsely called social."

Anglo-Catholic Christian socialism was part of Catholic polemic against perceived Protestant individualism and puritanism, which led many anti-Ritualist Protestants to associate Catholicism and socialism. Charles Haddon Spurgeon, an English Particular Baptist preacher, was critical of socialist doctrines, and warned that those who seek socialism "may soon have too much of it". Specifically, he regarded collectivist Christianity as inferior to faith on an individual level. He said: "I would not have you exchange the gold of individual Christianity for the base metal of Christian Socialism." Tommy Fallot, a French Lutheran pastor, argued: "Socialism has drawn a good deal of its program from the Gospel. It seeks to build a society on the pillars of justice, something the Gospel seeks to do as well. In that regard, a condemnation of socialism would represent a condemnation of the Gospel and the prophets."

Views of Christian socialism generally depend on the left–right political spectrum. While Christian leftists argue that Jesus would prioritize the poor and migrant's rights over opposition to abortion, Christian rightists argue he would be against wealth redistribution, illegal immigrants, abortion, and same-sex marriage. The conservative view is reflected by Lawrence Reed, president emeritus of the American libertarian-leaning Foundation for Economic Education, American conservative and evangelical Christian Johnnie Moore Jr., and Bryan Fischer, an American traditionalist conservative, of the American Family Association, a Christian fundamentalist organization. Opposing this view on the right is Quentin Letts, who said, "Jesus preached fairness—you could almost call him a Lefty".

== See also ==
- Agrarian socialism
- Buddhist socialism
- Catholic Church and politics
- Catholicism and socialism
- Christian left
- Christian libertarianism
- Christian right
- Christian Socialist Fellowship
- Christian views on poverty and wealth
- Islamic socialism
- Japan Socialist Party
- Jesus and the rich young man
- Jewish left
- Labour Church
- Labor Zionism
- Omnia sunt communia
- Political theology
- Progressive Christianity
- Religious views on capitalism
- Spiritual left
- Three-Self Patriotic Movement
- Catholic communism

== Bibliography ==
- Berman, David R. (2007). Radicalism in the Mountain West, 1890–1920: Socialists, Populists, Miners, and Wobblies. Boulder, Colorado: University Press of Colorado. ISBN 978-0-87081-884-4.
- Bourgel, Jonathan (Fall 2016). "The Destruction of the Samaritan Temple by John Hyrcanus: A Reconsideration". Journal of Biblical Literature. 135 (3): 505–523. doi:10.15699/jbl.1353.2016.3129. JSTOR 10.15699/jbl.1353.2016.3129.
- Braude, Ann (1989). Radical Spirits: Spiritualism and Women's Rights in Nineteenth-Century America. Boston, Massachusetts: Beacon Press. ISBN 978-0-8070-7500-5.
- Chalamet, Christophe (2013). Revivalism and Social Christianity: The Prophetic Faith of Henri Nick and André Trocmé. Eugene, Oregon: Pickwick Publications. ISBN 978-1-61097-858-3.
- Cort, John C. (1988). Christian Socialism: An Informal History. Maryknoll, New York: Orbis Books. ISBN 978-0-88344-574-7.
- Crown, Alan D., ed. (1989). The Samaritans. Mohr Siebeck. ISBN 978-3-161-45237-6.
- Cyranka, Daniel (2016). "Religious Revolutionaries and Spiritualism in Germany Around 1848". Aries. 16 (1). Leiden, Netherlands: Brill Academic Publishers: 13–38. doi:10.1163/15700593-01601002. ISSN 1570-0593.
- Davies, John; Jenkins, Nigel; Baines, Menna; Lynch, Peredur I., eds. (2008). The Welsh Academy Encyclopaedia of Wales. Cardiff: University of Wales Press. ISBN 978-0-7083-1953-6.
- Leech, Kenneth (2000). "Socialism". In Hastings, Adrian; Mason, Alistair; Pyper, Hugh (eds.). The Oxford Companion to Christian Thought. Oxford: Oxford University Press. pp. 676–678. ISBN 978-0-19-860024-4.
- Llwyd, Rhys (2015). "Plaid Cymru, Welsh Nationalism and Christianity: A Historical Perspective" (PDF). Ethics in Brief. 2015 Election Series (5). Cambridge, England: Kirby Laing Institute for Christian Ethics. Archived from the original (PDF) on 4 March 2016.
- Montero, Roman A. (2017). All Things in Common: The Economic Practices of the Early Christians. Eugene, Oregon: Wipf and Stock. ISBN 978-1-5326-0791-2.
- Norman, Edward (2002). The Victorian Christian Socialists. Cambridge, England: Cambridge University Press. doi:10.1017/CBO9780511560743. ISBN 978-0-521-53051-4.
- Reed, Lawrence (2015). Rendering unto Caesar: Was Jesus a Socialist?. Atlanta, Georgia: Foundation for Economic Education. ISBN 978-1-57246-037-9.
- Ruskin, John (1872). "Unto this Last": Four Essays on the First Principles of Political Economy. New York: John Wiley & Sons.
- Strube, Julian (2016a). "Socialist Religion and the Emergence of Occultism: A Genealogical Approach to Socialism and Secularization in 19th-Century France". Religion. 46 (3): 359–388. doi:10.1080/0048721X.2016.1146926. ISSN 1096-1151. S2CID 147626697.
- Strube, Julian (2016b). Sozialismus, Katholizismus und Okkultismus im Frankreich des 19. Jahrhunderts. Die Genealogie der Schriften von Eliphas Lévi [Socialism, Catholicism, and Occultism in Nineteenth-Century France: The Genealogy of the Writings of Eliphas Lévi]. Religionsgeschichtliche Versuche und Vorarbeiten (in German). Vol. 69. Berlin: De Gruyter. ISBN 978-3-11-047654-5.
