= Rabindra Kumar Das Gupta =

Indian scholar of Bengali and English literature

- Born: 11 July 1915; Calcutta, Bengal Presidency, British India
- Died: 3 February 2009 (aged 93); Kolkata, West Bengal, India
- Occupation(s): Linguist, administrator

Rabindra Kumar Das Gupta (11 July 1915 – 3 February 2009) was an Indian scholar of Bengali and English literature and a social and cultural commentator. He was considered by his peers as one of the last scholars with equal command of English and Bengali languages.

== Early life and education ==
As a child he was admitted to Calcutta Municipal Corporation Upper Primary School. He passed his matriculation from the New Indian School, in what was then Calcutta, in 1931.

He graduated from the Scottish Church College in 1935, where he had studied English and Bengali literature from scholars like William Spence Urquhart and Birendrabinode Roy.

He continued with his graduate studies at the University of Calcutta, where he earned an M.A. degree in English literature 1937. He received Regina Guha Gold Medal and U.N. Mitra Research Scholarship for his M.A. thesis on English Tragedies on Attic Lines. He also obtained the Premchand Raichand Scholar (PRS) award in 1939.

He was a Mouat Gold Medalist and obtained his Doctorate in Philosophy from the University of Calcutta in 1950.

He went to Exeter College on a Sir Rashbehari Ghosh Travelling Fellowship in 1955, to complete his D.Phil. in English literature on the works of John Milton, in record time. He worked under the guidance of Dame Helen Gardner.

== Career ==
=== Academic ===
After his post-graduation from the University of Calcutta, he was first appointed as a faculty at the post-graduate department of English at the University of Calcutta in 1938, where he worked until 1945. He was a Reader at University of Saugar from 1946 to 1947. He went to Delhi and joined as a professor in English at the Hindu College, University of Delhi. After that he was appointed as the Officiating Professor of English at Presidency College, Kolkata in 1958. In 1958 he joined Jadavpur University as a Reader in English, where he worked until 1960.

Subsequently, he joined Calcutta University as a Reader in English. He continued in this post until 1962. In the same year he went to Delhi as Tagore Professor of Bengali in the Department of Modern Indian Languages, University of Delhi and served in that post until 1977. While he was in Delhi, he was both a contemporary and colleague of eminent academics such as Sarvepalli Radhakrishnan and Amartya Sen. After retirement he was a professor at the Ramakrishna Mission Institute of Culture, Calcutta.

Later in life, he became the first Indian executive member of the International Comparative Literature Association and Canadian Review of Comparative Literature.

He contributed articles in Kolkata's English language daily, The Statesman and in the Bengali periodical Desh, till he became a nonagenarian.

=== Administration ===
He was also appointed as the Director of National Library, Kolkata but resigned later due to differences of opinion with the authorities.

== Views on Bengal Renaissance ==
He questioned the Eurocentric view of understanding the social reform movements in 19th century Bengal, which were collectively known as the Bengal Renaissance. Instead of relying on historians, either British or Indian, whom he criticized for applying the model of the European Renaissance, he emphasized Indian indigenous political-religious elements to understand the phenomenon better. In his critiques of Rabindranath Tagore and Sri Aurobindo, he emphasized the indigenous and spiritual elements in the Bengal Renaissance rather than Western influences. He upheld that colonial rule challenged the very concept of Indian civilization, something that even Muslim rule was unable to do.

== Books ==
- English Poets on India and Other Essays,
- Revolt in East Bengal, 1971,
- Revolutionary Ideas of Swami Vivekananda,
- Our National Anthem,
- East West Literary Relations,
- Swami Vivekananda's Vedantic Socialism,
- Bangali ki Atmaghati O Anyanya Rachana ('Are Bengalis Self-Destructive and Other Essays' in Bengali, in response to Nirad C. Chaudhuri's Atmaghati Bangali -- 'The Self-Destructive Bengali').

== Awards ==
- Sarojini Gold Medal for his essays on Michael Madhusudan Dutta.
- Rabindra Puraskar by the Government of West Bengal
- Desikottama by the Visva-Bharati University in 2006
- Sarat Puruskar in 2008
