= Christian socialism in Utah =

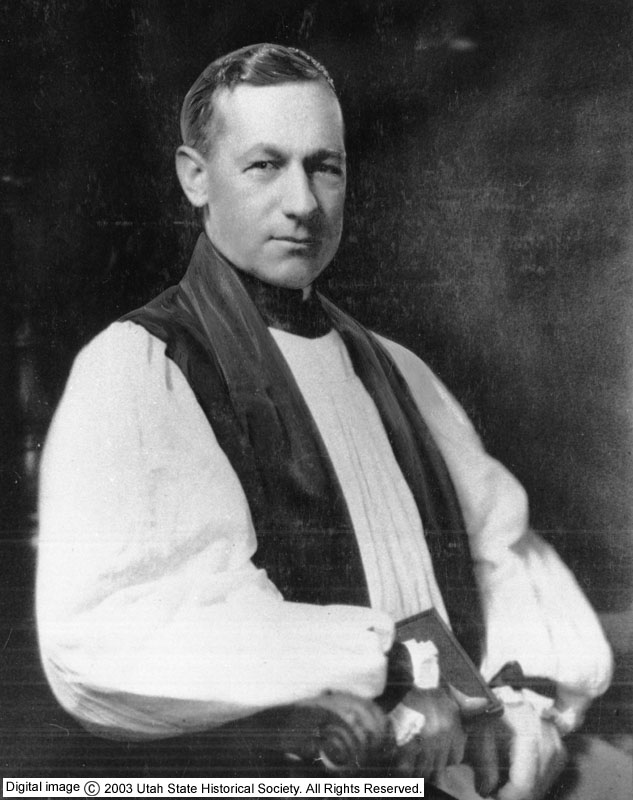
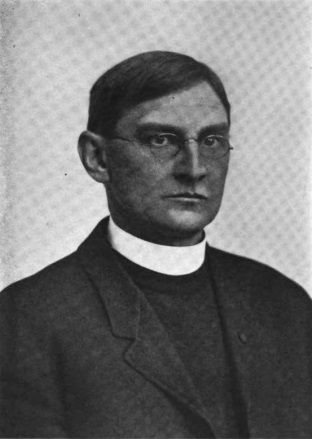
Paul Jones (left) and Franklin Spencer Spalding (right) were Episcopal bishops of Utah and socialists.

A robust tradition of Christian socialism in Utah developed and flourished in the first part of the 20th century, playing an important part in the development and expression of radicalism in Utah. Part of a larger, nationwide movement in many American Protestant churches, the Christian socialist movement was particularly strong in Utah, where dedicated Christian socialist ministers were fierce advocates for the miners laboring in the Mountain states.

== Overview ==
The connections between socialism and Christianity began to be identified in the United States as early as 1859, and by the late 1880s the first American Christian socialist organization, the Society of Christian Socialists, had formed. While the Christian socialist movement crossed through many Protestant denominations and churches, it was most strongly associated with the Episcopal Church, both nationwide and in Utah. There were Utah pastors and bishops who preached about Christian socialism often in church, and church and community organizations that were at least open to hearing the message, and often supportive of it. There was also open and lively debate in Utah about Christian socialism between its supporters and critics.

Drawing on the traditional doctrine of Christian socialism, Utah Christian socialists preached a message that combined Marxism and the lessons of the canonical gospels, promoting a vision of Christianity that valued cooperation, the welfare, and needs of the community prioritized over the individual, concern and action for the poor, and advocation for equality in regards to power and wealth. In addition to trying to free the church from a Christianity they perceived as overly associated with a capitalism incompatible with the teachings of Jesus, Christian socialists made it part of their mission to reach out to American workers dissatisfied with or outside of the American church. Religious unionists like William D. Mahon urged the church to return to its historical mission by joining with unions to fight "for the brotherhood of man, educating and teaching the people to free themselves from the thraldom of wage slavery, teaching the principles that every man is created free and equal, and has the rights to the products of his brain and brawn."

== History ==
While Bishop Franklin Spencer Spalding and Bishop Paul Jones were the dominant voices of Christian socialism in Utah, there were other Episcopal clergy counted as members in the movement including William Bulkley and Charles E. Perkins. The movement was not limited to the Episcopalians, as Unitarian minister William Thurston Brown, Presbyterian John Richelsen, and Methodist minister Richard Wake were all committed Christian socialists. In the town of Eureka, Utah, a mining community southwest of Salt Lake City, there were two Baptist ministers who were also Christian socialists: Charles McHarkness and C. C. Stillman. Eureka was a town of 3,000 people at the turn of the 20th century that had a local socialist party that counted 300 members in 1910. After electing six socialists to office in 1907—a mix of practicing and non-practicing Mormons, non-Mormons, and McHarkness—the town spent the next 18 years electing at least one socialist to office every year.

Utah Christians were divided on what role, if any, socialism should play in the church and in the country, leading ministers to engage each other over the proper course to take. On December 10, 1900, the Salt Lake Ministerial Association hosted a debate to determine if "socialism or individualism was taught by the New Testament as a basis for Christian government." Methodist minister and Christian socialist Richard Wake argued that the Bible "pointed plainly to socialistic principles" as the proper form of Christian government and that focusing on the individual was a narrowing of Christ's universal teachings. Wake's fellow Methodist minister and coworker, Alfred H. Henry, argued that men's attempts to properly better themselves would "accomplish more towards Christian results" than socialism.

Another approach at least one Utah minister took was calling for an "evolutionary rather than revolutionary program" that would fight for workers' rights through elections and the "gradual extension of existing governmental institutions". John Richelsen, a minister at Westminster Presbyterian Church in Salt Lake City, advocated for "common ownership of all productive capital, governmental management of enterprises, and equitable distribution of wealth" in a sermon titled "Labor's Political Platform" in July 1904. Richelsen was quick to stay away from engaging in party politics, or campaign stumping, rather arguing that socialism was a "theory of government, not a political party", separating himself from the declared Christian socialist clergy in Utah, while still aligning himself with the underlying principles they advocated. The day after the sermon, the Salt Lake Herald dedicated nearly two and half columns in their newspaper to covering it.

Christian socialists met frequently and Christian socialist clergy spoke often about labor issues, socialism, and the movement in Salt Lake City and other parts of Utah. Such meetings included twice weekly meetings in summer and fall of 1908 by the Salt Lake City Christian Socialist Fellowship, a series of lectures to the Park City Socialist Club from the town's Methodist minister in October 1909, and a packed lecture about reconciling socialism with Christianity given by the state's Socialist Party of America organizer and practicing Mormon, George J. Fox, in the city of Fillmore, Utah, in 1911.

Despite the influence of Christian socialism on Utah socialist thought and party power, there was still deep division within the Christian community of the state over the issue. Christian socialism was covered often in local newspapers and frequently discussed in non-Christian socialist groups, churches, and bible study groups. It was also hotly debated within the socialist community of Utah itself, with many socialists arguing there was no place in the movement for Christian values or rhetoric. Often the argument went that churches were by nature more aligned with the status quo and afraid of change, which made them a natural enemy to the more revolutionary aspects of socialism. There was also a deep distrust found in many socialists regarding the true allegiance of churches and a fear that churches were naturally aligned with employers and capitalists whose money was often their leading funding source.

== Notable Christian socialists ==
Episcopal bishop Spalding was the most notable Utah Christian socialist, widely known in both Utah and in labor and news circle nationwide. Spalding came to Utah in 1905 committed to socialist principles due to his experiences with harsh working conditions in Erie, Pennsylvania. Like many other socialists in the Mountain West, Spalding's commitment was reinforced and strengthened by his work with the miners who made up much of the region's industrial workforce. Spalding forcefully stated that "the Christian Church exists for the sole purpose of saving the human race." He added:

"So far she has failed, but I think that Socialism shows her how she may succeed. It insists that men cannot be made right until material conditions be made right. Although man cannot live by bread alone, he must have bread. Therefore the Church must destroy a system of society which inevitably creates and perpetuates unequal and unfair conditions of life. These unequal and unfair conditions have been created by competition. Therefore competition must cease and cooperation take its place."

Spalding's views and analysis of class issues and American materialism would become well known and reported on. While he never joined the Socialist Party himself, he publicly urged others to vote for the Socialist Party in elections. In the beginning of the First World War, Spalding spoke publicly and forcefully in favor in peace. Before Spalding could fully develop his pacifist message, he was killed crossing a Salt Lake City street.

Spalding was succeeded as Utah's Episcopal bishop by his student and friend, Paul Jones. Jones came from a similar background as Spalding and had little exposure or inclination towards socialism in his early life. Jones conversion to socialism came through study of the English Christian socialists F. D. Maurice and Charles Kingsley in seminary and through the Social Gospel tenets making their way through the Episcopal Church during his theological training. This foundation along with the influence, mentorship, and teaching of Spalding committed Jones to the Christian socialist cause and these views deepened and strengthened due to his work in Utah.

Unlike Spalding, Jones joined the Socialist Party, citing his desire to make clear his political opinions, along with giving himself an anchor to prevent his new position of bishop from leading him into "the easy acceptance of things as they are". Jones never shied away from talking about socialism within the church; it was Jones's absolute pacifism that would ultimately cause his demise in the church, not his socialism. Jones's pacifism was more influenced by his Christian beliefs than the suffering worker based arguments against war that was more prevalent in socialism. Jones's pacifism was of a more radical bent, demonstrated by Jones's pointed speeches urging Americans to be loyal citizens through war resistance and living up to their, and the nation's, best ideals. Just days before the United States entered World War I, Jones gave an anti-war speech at a meeting sponsored by the Socialist Party of Utah, in which he strongly denounced Utahns who were speaking out in favor of the war effort, calling them "hot-headed pseudo-patriots". This kind of outspokenness on the war issue, and the press it generated, forced Jones to resign his bishopric in December 1917.

From November 1906 until June 1910, William Thurston Brown served as a minister in Utah, preaching the message of Christian socialism. Active in radical circles his entire adult life, Brown's politics ran further and further leftward during the first two decades of the 20th century. Described by fellow radical and friend Emma Goldman as a revolutionary socialist, Brown spent his life opposing the status quo and advocating for change. Brown was educated at Yale University and Yale Divinity School before taking his first ministry at the First Congregational Church of Madison, Connecticut, where his radical politics deeply divided the congregation. Brown bounced around the east coast before settling in Utah; he ran for lieutenant governor of New York on the Socialist Party ticket, and preached at the Unitarian Church of Our Father in Boston. Brown set up a Unitarian church in Ogden, Utah, in 1906 and then assumed the ministry at Salt Lake City's First Unitarian Church in December 1907, a position he held until he retired from the pulpit in June 1910.

Brown's message had three central tenets: that churches could not ignore social problems and must be agents for social justice; that while capitalism was the root of social problems, socialism had the power to fix them; and that the Gospel of Jesus and Gospel of Marx were one and the same. A prolific article and pamphlet writer his entire life, Brown laid out his message in the pamphlet Socialism and Primitive Christianity published by Charles H. Kerr and Company, a leading radical publisher. The pamphlet argued that socialism was not just aligned with Christian teachings but was also a powerful religious movement of its own, or in his own words, "the logical and historical successor to primitive Christianity ... the only thing in our world today that bears any moral or spiritual resemblance to the religion of Jesus." In addition to writing, Brown preached the same message from the pulpit and from the political stump, always maintaining that Christianity and socialism were identical. Believing that capitalism was an ever-present, all consuming system for those who lived within it, Brown felt that churches must do all that they could to combat this influence. Eventually, he decided that churches were not willing or able to do the work necessary to enact social change and resigned his ministry to devote all of his time to socialism and change. After his resignation he spent a year in Utah working with the Socialist Party and drafting the Utah State Socialist Party platform in 1910. Touring a large part of the state that year, Brown spoke in many mining and working-class communities to help advocate in the interests of workers.

Before leaving Utah, Brown helped to establish the Salt Lake City Modern School in 1910, a private school founded on the educational teachings of Spanish anarchist Francisco Ferrer. Brown left Salt Lake City a year later and spent another thirteen years working as part of the Modern School movement, becoming the leading Modern School founder in the United States by eventually establishing five schools. Brown went on to teach at the Menlo School and Junior College in Atherton, California, for eleven years.

== Bibliography ==
- Berman, David R. (2007). Radicalism in the Mountain West, 1890–1920: Socialists, Populists, Miners, and Wobblies. Boulder, Colorado: University Press of Colorado. ISBN 978-0-87081-884-4.
- McCormick, John S.; Sillito, John R. (1989). "Socialists in Power: The Eureka, Utah Experience, 1907–1925". Weber Studies. 6 (1): 55–67. Archived from the original on July 6, 2010.
- ——— (2011). A History of Utah Radicalism Startling, Socialistic, and Decidedly Revolutionary. Logan, Utah: Utah State University Press. ISBN 978-0-87421-848-0.
- Spargo, John (1909). "Christian Socialism in America". American Journal of Sociology. 15 (1): 16–20. doi:10.1086/211752. ISSN 0002-9602. JSTOR 2762617. S2CID 145687046. Zenodo: 1431287.
