= Werner Flume =

German jurist (1908–2009)

- Born: 12 September 1908; Kamen, Kingdom of Prussia, German Empire
- Died: 28 January 2009 (aged 100); Bonn, North Rhine-Westphalia, Germany
- Burial place: Central cemetery, Bad Godesberg

Werner Flume (12 September 1908 – 28 January 2009) was a German jurist and professor of Roman law, private law, tax law and a legal historian. He has significantly influenced the modern development of German private law and has been called a "lawyer of the century" for his contributions.

== Life ==
=== Early life and studies ===
Flume was born on 12 September 1908 in Kamen. After graduating from the Gymnasium Hammonense in Hamm, Flume studied history and ancient languages at the University of Tübingen from the summer semester of 1927 onwards, but quickly switched to the faculty of law after attending a lecture by Philipp Heck on the foundations of German private law. During the winter semester of 1927/1928, Flume transferred to the University of Bonn, where he completed his law studies, interrupted only by a semester in Berlin. During his studies in Bonn, Fritz Schulz – a Roman law scholar – became the academic teacher of Flume.

In 1930 Flume passed the First State Examination in Law before the Higher Regional Court of Cologne and in July 1931 he wrote his doctoral thesis titled "Studien zur Akzessorietät der römischen Bürgschaftsstipulationen".

=== Friedrich-Wilhelm University years ===
In the winter semester 1931/1932, Flume followed Fritz Schulz as his academic assistant to the Friedrich-Wilhelm University in Berlin, who succeeded Theodor Kipp. At Berlin university, Flume wrote the core of his thesis "Eigenschaftsirrtum und Kauf", which – however – was not to be published until 1948 and was originally intended as the basis for his habilitation. But after the establishment of Nazi Germany, Fritz Schulz was removed from Berlin University due to his Jewish heritage under the antisemitic 1933 Law for the Restoration of the Professional Civil Service and Flume thus lost his academic teacher.

Furthermore, at a university assistants' meeting an SA-affiliated faculty leader and fellow academic assistant, Gerd Voss, argued for a boycott of Jewish professors; Flume called him a "pig" in response, especially considering that Voss had been an academic assistant to Martin Wolff before 1933. Afterwards, Flume had an enemy who according to Flume hindered his plans for a habilitation, which he had to abandon, and Voss – who later died during the Röhm purge – even called for Flume's internment at the Oranienburg concentration camp. Modern scholarship is, however, divided on what exactly halted Flume's habilitation; he stayed on at the Friedrich-Wilhelm University until the summer semester of 1935.

In 1936, Flume began publishing on tax law and tax policy topics in the Handelsblatt – a German business newspaper – and, from 1948, in the German legal journal Der Betrieb. Later, he befriended Friedrich Vogel, the publisher of the Handelsblatt.

=== Time in legal practise and habilitation ===
Flume then left the Friedrich-Wilhelm University and pursued his legal traineeship (his Rechtsreferendariat), which he completed in 1936 with the Second State Examination in Law. Afterwards, he worked for a printing and publishing company, where he did tax and company law, until he was drafted into the Wehrmacht in August 1944 and partook in World War II. At the end of the war, he fled the Russian occupied territories and briefly became an American prisoner-of-war.

After the war, Flume initially worked as a legal advisor to a publishing company in Dortmund and as a legal adviser to a steelwork. He then continued to pursue his academic career and restarted the process for his habilitation, now supervised by Wolfgang Kunkel. In 1946, he was habilitated in Bonn – even though Wolfgang Kunkel was a professor in Heidelberg since 1943 – with the work "Die Vererblichkeit der suspensiv bedingten Obligationen nach klassischem römischem Recht", which had already been published ten years earlier in Tijdschrift voor Rechtsgeschiedenis, a Dutch law journal.

=== Academic career in Berlin, Göttingen and Bonn ===
From 1948 onwards, Flume worked as a Privatdozent in Bonn. In 1949 he became a full professor of law at the University of Göttingen, where he held the professorship for Roman law. In 1953 he became a professor at the University of Bonn. There he initially held a chair for private and tax law and from 1957 onwards he also took over the chair for Roman law, that his academic teacher Fritz Schulz had held before his forced retirement.

In 1959 he declined a call to the University of Heidelberg for a Roman law chair and continued to stay at the University of Bonn until he retired as Emeritus in 1976. Flume was succeeded on his Roman law chair by Rolf Knütel.

=== Death ===
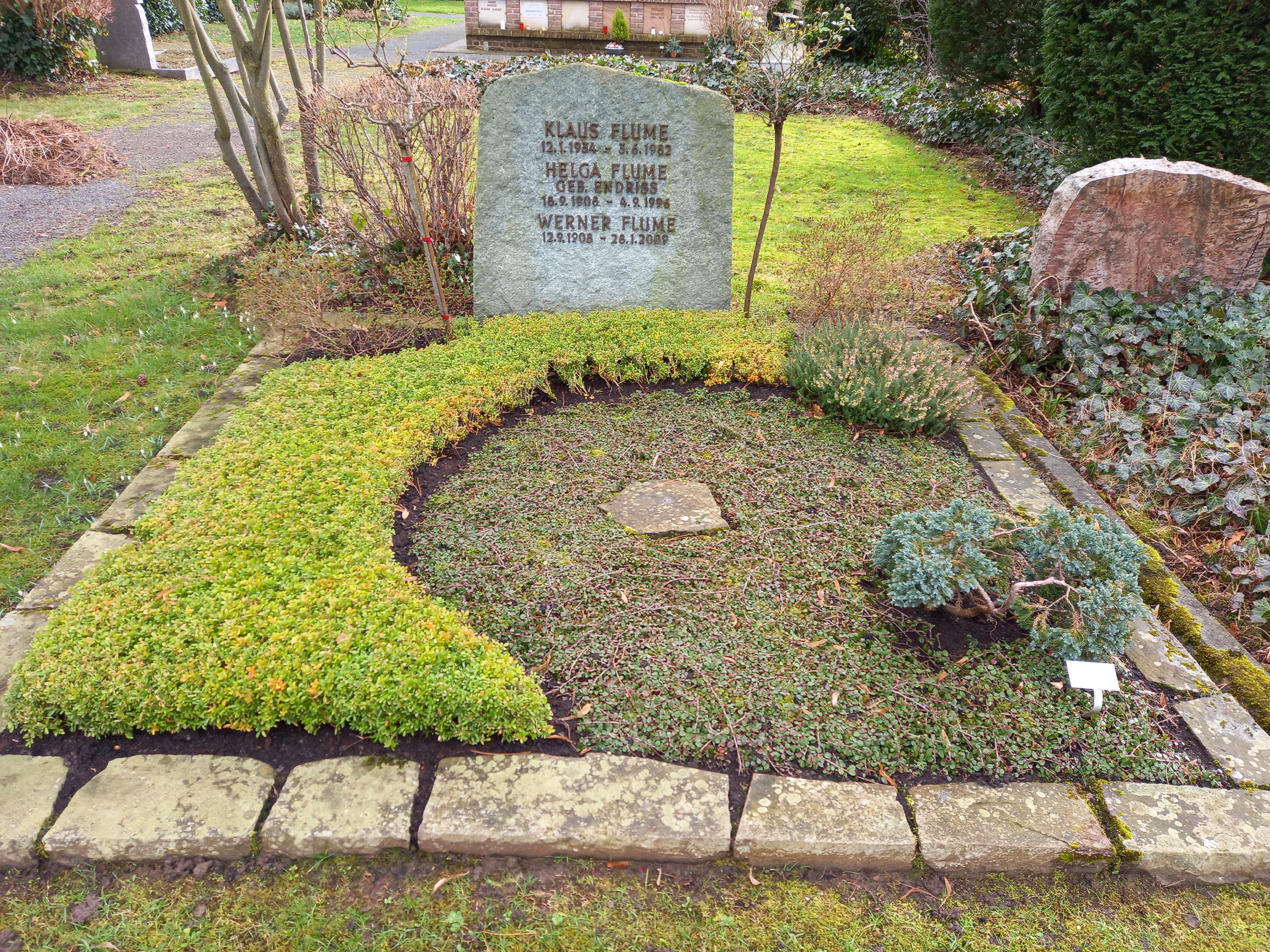
The grave of Werner Flume and his wife at the Bad Godesberg central cemetery in Bonn

Flume died 28 January 2009 in Bonn, four months after his hundredth birthday.

== Work and reception ==
Flume's most important work (opus magnum) is said to be "Bürgerliches Recht – Allgemeiner Teil", published in three volumes. In this work, he endeavours to redevelop the individual doctrines of the General Part of the German Civil Code (Allgemeiner Teil des Bürgerlichen Rechts) from the idea of private autonomy (freedom of contract) in the traditions of the German Historical School of Law. In this work, he presents a private law for free citizens, who freely conclude contracts in order to autonomously regulate their own legal relationships – within the framework of a centuries-old historically developed legal order. Flume's historical perspective on private law made him cite Friedrich Carl von Savigny frequently in this work. Heribert Prantl called the first volume of this opus magnum a "legal school of thought beyond compare."

In 1972 Flume developed the so-called "Gruppenlehre" (group doctrine), which argues for the (partial) legal capacity of the German civil law partnership (Gesellschaft bürgerlichen Rechts). Twenty-nine years later, the Federal Court of Justice endorsed this doctrine in its decision of 29 January 2001 (the "ARGE Weißes Ross" decision) and granted (partial) legal capacity to the German civil law partnership.

In addition, Flume established within his 1948 work "Eigenschaftsirrtum und Kauf" the subjective concept of defect (subjektiver Fehlerbegriff) for the purposes of sales law. According to this concept, the contracting parties alone determine in their contract what constitutes a defect, which in turn determines the seller's liability for defects of the object of sale. This subjective concept of defect later became written law with the 2002 revision of the German law of obligations (Schuldrechtsmodernisierung).

Flume was a staunch opponent of apparent authority (Anscheinsvollmacht) and throughout his life, he paid particular attention to the law of unjust enrichment. There, he contributed his "Theorie der vermögensmäßigen Entscheidung".

In his legal thinking, Flume refused to derive concrete answers to private and tax law issue from constitutional concepts enshrined in the German Basic Law. According to him, only the individual is the pivotal point of private law, not constitutional ideas. In his view, social and economic policy decisions should not be taken by civil lawyers.

During his career, Flume brought forward four academic students: Eduard Picker (Tübingen), Jan Wilhelm (Passau), Horst Heinrich Jakobs (Bonn) and Brigitte Knobbe-Keuk (Bonn).

== Family ==
Flume married in March 1933.

== Recognition ==
For his contributions to the German private law, Thomas Lobinger – a Heidelberg University professor – called Flume a "lawyer of the century" ("Jahrhunderjurist").

=== Honours ===
- 1952: Full member of the Göttingen Academy of Sciences and Humanities
- 1972: Full member of the North Rhine-Westphalian Academy of Sciences, Humanities and the Arts
- 1977: Corresponding fellow of the British Academy
- 1982: Corresponding member of the Bavarian Academy of Sciences and Humanities
- 19 January 1982: Honorary doctorate from the University of Regensburg

=== Festschriften ===
- Jakobs, Horst Heinrich; Ballerstedt, Kurt; Mann, F. A. (1978). Festschrift für Werner Flume zum 70. Geburtstag, 12. September 1978 (in German). Köln: Otto Schmidt. ISBN 3504060069. Two volumes.
- Jakobs, Horst Heinrich; Picker, Eduard; Wilhelm, Jan; Ernst, Wolfgang; Hüttemann, Rainer; Schön, Wolfgang (1998). Festgabe für Werner Flume: zum 90. Geburtstag (in German). Berlin, Heidelberg: Springer. doi:10.1007/978-3-642-58963-8. ISBN 978-3-642-63804-6.

== Major published works ==
A full bibliography of Flume's works (up to 1978) is contained in his 1978 Festschrift.

- Flume, Werner (1932). Studien zur Akzessorietät der römischen Bürgschaftsstipulationen (in German). Weimar: Böhlau. OCLC 215051505.
- Flume, Werner (1948). Eigenschaftsirrtum und Kauf (in German). Münster: Regensberg.
- Flume, Werner (1977). Allgemeiner Teil des Bürgerlichen Rechts (in German). Vol. I Teil 1: Die Personengesellschaft (1 ed.). Berlin, Heidelberg: Springer. doi:10.1007/978-3-642-61894-9. ISBN 978-3-540-08333-7.
- Flume, Werner (1983). Allgemeiner Teil des Bürgerlichen Rechts (in German). Vol. I Teil 2: Die juristische Person (1 ed.). Berlin, Heidelberg: Springer. doi:10.1007/978-3-642-61788-1. ISBN 978-3-540-12601-0.
- Flume, Werner (1992). Allgemeiner Teil des Bürgerlichen Rechts (in German). Vol. II: Das Rechtsgeschäft (4 ed.). Berlin, Heidelberg: Springer. doi:10.1007/978-3-642-58112-0. ISBN 978-3-540-55211-6.
- Flume, Werner (1990). Rechtsakt und Rechtsverhältnis: römische Jurisprudenz und modernrechtliches Denken (in German). Paderborn, München, Wien, Zürich: Schöningh. ISBN 3506733567.
