= Omnia sunt communia =

Latin slogan and legal maxim

Omnia sunt communia is a Latin phrase and slogan that literally means "all are common" but has been variously translated as "all things are to be held in common" or simply "all things in common". Originating in the Latin translation of the Acts of the Apostles, altered forms of the slogan were applied as a legal maxim in canon law and later in secular law. Originally, it was the central precept of the community of "the Way", and was later a slogan of the labouring class in the German Peasants' War of 1524-1525, referred to as Christian communism, the concept of koinonia, which means common or shared life.

== Origin ==
Omnia sunt communia derives from Acts 2:44 and 4:32 in the Christian Bible. The primitive church practised a form of communalism whereby all private property was sold off by its owners and the capital raised was placed in a common pool to be distributed to those in need of it. The inspiration for this practice was the teaching of Jesus Christ on the fate of the rich and the blessings of the poor. For example, in his so-called Sermon on the Mount and Sermon on the Plain, and when he instructed the rich, "If you wish to be perfect, go and sell your possessions and give the money to the poor, and you will have treasure in heaven; then come, follow me."

A further impulse to the enlargement of the house (church) of the Lord was a mystical experience shared by the disciples, and witnessed by "devout men living in Jerusalem from every nation under the sky", on the day of Pentecost, the festival of Shavuot, fifty days after Passover, in which a violent wind, appearing as tongues of fire, came to rest on each disciple's head. Peter then made a speech imploring the people to turn to god, which resulted in at least 3,000 joining the new community in one day. This event is celebrated by Christians as the beginning of the church and is usually dated to somewhere between AD 30 and 36.

The standard Koine Greek texts of the New Testament describe the Early Christians of the Apostolic Age as "having all things in common" (Ancient Greek: εἶχον ἅπαντα κοινά, eîchon hápanta koiná). Subsequent to Peter and John's first trial before the Sanhedrin, the followers of the Way are described as "one in heart and mind" and it is repeated that "to them all things were in common" (ἦν αὐτοῖς πάντα κοινά, ēn autois panta koina). In the Vulgate, Jerome's Latin translation, these passages become "they held all things in common" (Latin: habebant omnia communia, literally "they had all in common") and "to them all things were in common" (omnia communia, literally "to them they were all in common").

== Legal doctrine ==
The 12th-century Italian jurist Bernardus Papiensis adapted the phrase into canon law as tempore necessitate omnia sunt communia, "in a time of necessity all things are common". In his treatise on justice in the Summa Theologica, 13th-century philosopher Thomas Aquinas used the same phrase, as well as the broader concept, to argue that it was not a sin for a person to steal if they were motivated by genuine need. Dialogus, a text written in the 14th century by William of Ockham, also used the specific Latin phrase omnia sunt communia. The same principle was later applied in secular law in various contexts, including justifying emergency taxation by a monarch.

Hugo Grotius used the phrase as adapted by Papiensis to argue that states must not prevent refugees from entering their lands if they had been forced out of their own. English jurist Matthew Hale added a qualifier, proposing that in casu extremæ necessitatis omnia sunt communia, literally "in cases of extreme necessity everything is held in common". In English common law, this essentially meant that private property could be seized by the government for the purpose of its defense, and the previous owners of that property would have no legal recourse. More broadly, it signified that the welfare of the community was prioritized over that of any individual. This concept developed over time into expropriation, as well as eminent domain.

== Other historical use ==
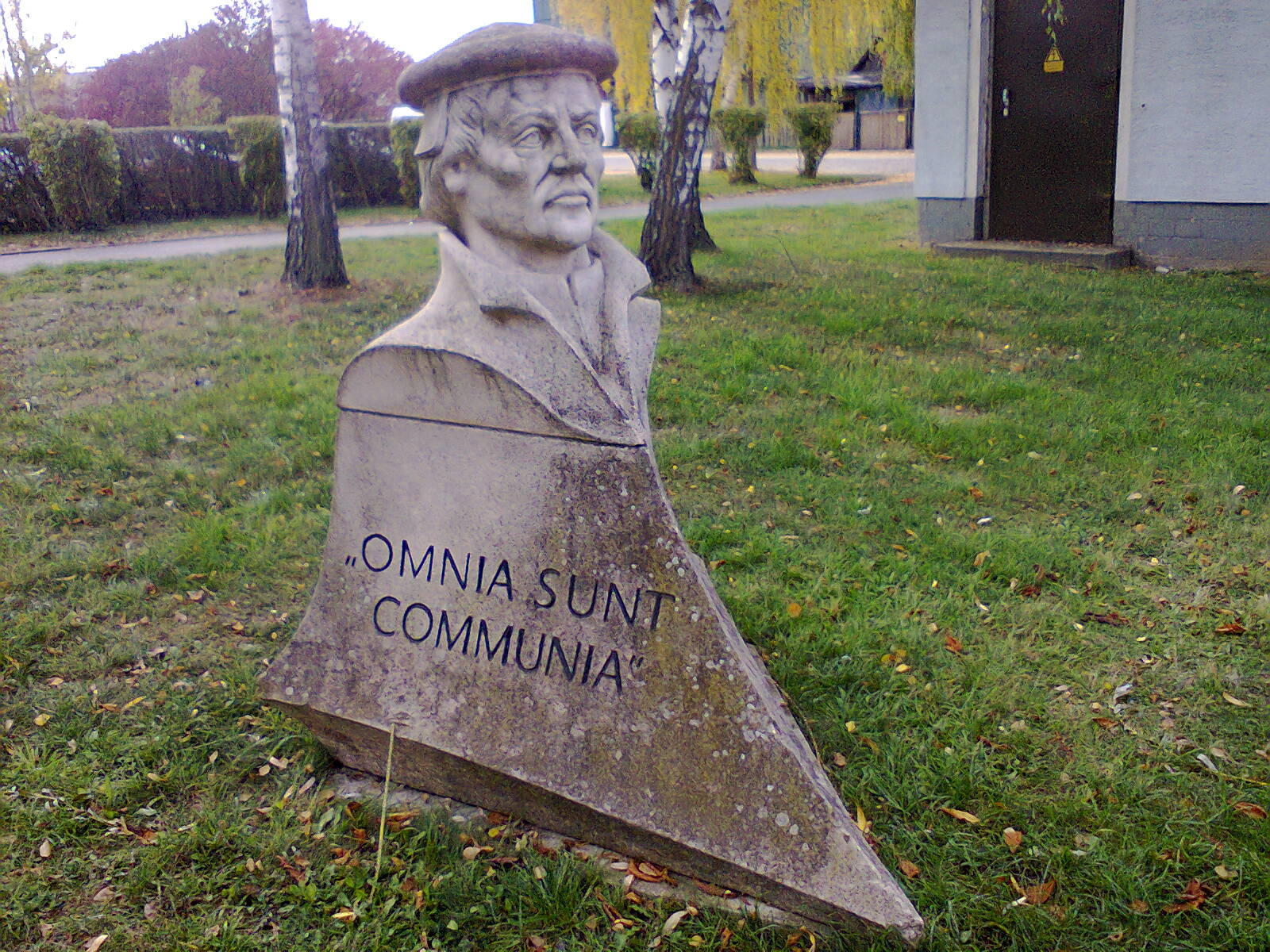
Monument to Thomas Müntzer with the text Omnia Sunt Communia

The description of the members of the early church in Acts was a key inspiration for Christian communism. Thomas Müntzer, a leader in the German Peasants' War, described the concept of omnia sunt communia as the definition of the Gospel, arguing also that all things "should be distributed as occasion requires, according to the several necessities of all".

In Utopia by Thomas More, the phrase omnia sunt communia is used to describe the lifestyle of the Utopians, as on More's fictional island of Utopia "all things are held in common".

== Modern use ==
Modern left-winged movements have adopted the phrase, such as autonomist Marxism, the commons movement, and other social movements.

After Madrid municipal elections in 2015, several city councillors swore their positions using omnia sunt communia.

== See also ==
- Koinonia – Christian fellowship
- Zwijndrechtse Nieuwlichters – 19th cent. Christian sect inspired by apostolic communism
- "From each according to his ability, to each according to his needs" – Communist slogan
- The Goose and the Common - 18th cent. poem that condemned enclosure

== Works cited ==
- "Pentecost", Religions: Christianity, London: BBC, 2014.
- Alward, Silas (1899). "Expropriation of Property". Canadian Law Times. 18 (11): 230–236.
- Baker-Smith, Dominic (2014). "On Translating More's Utopia". Canadian Review of Comparative Literature. 41 (4): 492–505. doi:10.1353/crc.2014.0044. ISSN 1913-9659. S2CID 162268309 – via Project MUSE.
- Boer, Roland (February 11, 2019). Red Theology: On the Christian Communist Tradition. Studies in Critical Research on Religion. Vol. 10. Brill Publishers. doi:10.1163/9789004394773_003. ISBN 978-90-04-39477-3. S2CID 188857352.
- de Wilde, Marc (2015). "Emergency Powers and Constitutional Change in the Late Middle Ages". Legal History Review. 83 (1): 26–59. doi:10.1163/15718190-08312p03. S2CID 142368337 – via Hein Online.
- de Wilde, Marc (2018). "Seeking Refuge: Grotius on Exile, Expulsion and Asylum". Journal of the History of International Law. 20 (4): 471–500. doi:10.1163/15718050-12340094. hdl:11245.1/71037332-fc73-4739-81e1-3afef78b648d. S2CID 151145377 – via Hein Online.
- Offler, H. S. (1977). "The Three Modes of Natural Law in Ockham: A Revision of the Text". Franciscan Studies. 37 (1): 207–218. doi:10.1353/frc.1977.0004. ISSN 1945-9718. S2CID 171071867 – via Project MUSE.
