= Jacques Martin (pacifist) =

French pastor (1906–1998)

Jacques Martin (French pronunciation: [ʒak maʁtɛ̃]; 1906–2001) was a French pacifist, one of the first conscientious objectors in France, and a Protestant pastor. His commitment to French Resistance and to the protection of persecuted Jews earned him the recognition of Yad Vashem as a "Righteous Among the Nations." He died in Die on 23 July 2001.

== Biography ==
=== Youth and formative years ===
Jacques Martin was born on 24 June 1906 in Sainte-Colombe, Rhône where his father was teaching. His grandfather was a methodist minister. From 1923 to 1927, he studied at the Protestant Faculty of Theology in Paris. There he became friends with André Trocmé, who was a few years older than him. He also met another student, Henri Roser, whose militant pacifist and internationalist ideas shook French Protestant society of that time. Jacques Martin then became a pacifist himself, and wished to contribute personally to international reconciliation, starting with France and Germany. He crisscrossed Germany walking through the 1925 summer. As a member of the French branch of the World Student Christian Federation (WSCF, which is casually referred to as the “Fédé”), he took part in the 1926 German gathering of the WSCF. The same year he took charge of the editing of “Cahiers de la Réconciliation » (at the time a simple information bulletin which would be taken over and developed by Henri Roser from November 1927 on). In 1927, he took part in an "international reconciliation youth camp" in Vaumarcus, Switzerland, studied one semester in Berlin in 1929, where he got in touch with German pacifist Friedrich Siegmund-Schultze. In 1930, he welcomed Gandhi in Paris. From 1930 to 1932 he was the secretary of the WSCF.

=== Conscientious objector ===
In spite of his pacifist convictions, Jacques Martin performed military service in 1927-1928 - out of care for his father who had just been shaken by the loss of two sons. However, in December 1930, he returned his military papers, specifying that, as a Christian, he could not bear arms. In 1932, he refused to take part in a training session of the military reserve force and he was consequently arrested, tried and condemned to 12 months in prison on 11 October 1932. On 23 janvier 1934, Jacques Martin married Jacqueline Élié in Alès. In the summer of 1934, the young couple was expecting its first child when a new call-in letter arrived for a new follow-up military training, which he again refused to attend. He is arrested in the midst of the “Fédé”’s summer camp, and condemned to another 18 months in prison in February 1935. He was released in January 1936 and again briefly imprisoned in 1937, 1938 and 1939. His only companions on this harsh road of conscience objection were at this stage a protestant theology student, Philippe Vernier and a protestant primary school teacher Camille Rombault. His failing health ensured his definitive exemption from military service before the start of WWII.

Jacques Martin turned each of his trials into a platform to advertise for conscience objection. His defence counsel was solicitor and socialist MP André Philip, who called upon leading intellectuals like Jean Guéhenno or Marc Sangnier and upon representatives of the French Human Rights League. As early as 1928, Martin had temporarily given up on his career in church ministry because of the staunch opposition of institutional protestantism towards his pacifist and anti-militaristic positions. In 1938, still unable to become a pastor, he accepted a position of administrative and human resources director in a silk stockings manufacturing plant in Ganges, Hérault.

=== War years ===
In the wake of the first Vichy anti-Jewish legislation by Marshall Pétain's government on 3 October 1940, Jacques Martin decided jointly with Ganges' pastor Élie Gounelle to call for a regional meeting of all Protestant pastors in the area, in order to pray and reflect on the new situation, including the apparent support apparently extended to the Vichy government by the church authorities – including, at that early stage, by the president of the Protestant Federation of France, pastor Marc Boegner. According to Jacques Martin's own account, the day was "dedicated to the problem of anti-Semitism or rather to anti-Semitism and the Bible". A second such meeting, in November 1942, would be organised to respond to the new situation created by the roundups of 26 August 1942 in the southern zone of France. In both of these meetings, Jacques Martin shared a very well-informed and accurate documentation which allowed pastors to prepare themselves for resistance to the antisemitic policy of the Vichy regime.

At the same time, the Martins had joined the CIMADE in close cooperation with Madeleine Barot. They intervened in several ways: supplying packages with food or warm clothes for the Gurs internment camp internees, sheltering fleeing Jews and routing them towards safe caches or appropriate underground escape routes, forging identity cards and ration tickets for the hidden Jews. They also hid Jacques' brother-in-law, pastor André Trocmé when he had to go underground in their family house in Drôme. On 22 June 1944, Jacques Martin was reported to the police by his direct neighbour. He was arrested by the Milice and detained in Montpellier's prison. Strangely, the local Resistance managed to negotiate his release in exchange for a flock of 1,000 sheep. He was freed three days before the liberation of his area. During the war years he became friends with historian Jules Isaac who had sought refuge in Ganges.

=== Lay and clerical ministries ===
After the war, Jacques Martin was back in touch with the Social Christians, a mainly protestant movement seeking to join together evangelism and care for the poorer classes of society; after meeting with Élie Gounelle at Musée Social (a Parisian think tank), he prepared the relaunching of the movement and of its magazine, the Revue du Christianisme Social. He also organised the 25th Christian Social Congress in Paris.

In 1948, he participated in the creation of the French branch of the International Council of Christians and Jews, called les Amitiés judéo-chrétiennes (A.J.C. – Jewish Christian Friendships) whose first president was catholic theologian Henri-Irénée Marrou, while Jacques Martin was both the first vice-president and the AJC bulletin's editor. While continuing with its commitments with the CIMADE, A.J.C., and Social Christians, Jacques Martin still didn't apply to become a pastor although the institutional opposition had then faded away. (Henri Roser was for instance now in charge of a parish.) He preferred to experience the position of a "committed layman".

From 1947 to 1950, he ran a bookshop in Le Chambon-sur-Lignon where he also taught Latin at the Collège Cévenol, then from 1950 to 1966 he ran another bookshop in Lyon.

On 29 March 1966, he welcomed Martin Luther King Jr. on his visit in Lyon. Finally he felt the need to "bind the sheaf" and was ordained on 9 January 1966 by the French Reformed Church (after a last hesitation from the institution, as the candidate is already 60!) and took a position with the Geneva state church. He is put in charge of the creation of a new parish in a newly built area of the greater Geneva. This parish is now known as the Centre Communautaire Protestant du Lignon. Having retired in 1973, he still performed pastoral tasks in Mens from 1973 to 1977, and finally took full retirement in the area of Die, still acting as a substitute pastor in case of vacancies).

He died in Die on 23 July 2001. His wife had died 5 years earlier on 30 September 1996. They had had six children: André (1934-1934), Violaine (born 1937), Daniel (born 1937), Amy-Christiane (1939–1945), Jean-Marc (born 1941) et Ariane (born 1950).

== Distinctions ==
After WWII, he was awarded the Croix de guerre in tribute to his fight "to help Compulsory Work Service dodgers, les réfractaires, les maquisards and all victims of enemy repression." On 22 June 1998, Yad Vashem awarded the recognition of Righteous Among the Nations both to pastor Jacques Martin and to his wife Jacqueline.

== Contribution and legacy ==
=== Clear-sightedness over Nazism and antisemitism ===
Probably unique among pacifists, Jacques Martin was "one of the very few" who rejected the "hopes of a nebulous French-German reconciliation" stemming from the Munich Agreement and who therefore were immediately "in Resistance", according to Jacques Martin's own words in 1938: "I remain more than ever non-violent. But I do not harbour any confusion between non-violence and non-resistance. Non-violence means placing resistance on another level than the test of military forces. This resistance is necessary." In a context where justifications of antisemitism abound, sometimes even from protestants, Jacques Martin published in August 1939 an article entitled "Pagan ... and Christian anti-Semitism" ("L'Antisémitisme païen... et chrétien"). In its first part, the article gives a detailed list, country by country, of antisemitic persecutions in Europe, while the second part deals with the Christians' attitude and sometimes responsibility. Referring to the traditional Christian accusation of Jewish deicide, he asks: "Who does not reject Christ ? Does Christianity not bear the same responsibility than the Jews for the crucifixion of its Master ? Is our own so-called Christian civilisation not bearing more witness of a deeper and more serious rejection and blasphemy than the shouts of a versatile crowd or the calculations of a sanhedrin lost in its clericalism and its pride?"

=== Preparation for anti-Nazi resistance ===
With their two pastoral meeting held in Ganges, Jacques Martin and Elie Gounelle prepared their colleagues to exert solidarity towards the persecuted Jews. "We had gathered all the pastors of this area of the Cevennes to study this question. These were necessary preliminaries. Caring for the Jews didn't happen spontaneously, not even from the camisards' memory! A long preparation phase, a reflection were needed first, often in opposition with certain Protestant theological concepts, where Judaism was regarded as a mere preamble to Christianity, whereas there was a real spiritual problem, alongside a humanitarian situation from 1942 onwards." For these meetings, Jacques Martin had gathered very significant documentation, first on the events on the ground which he had ample information about through the Cimade network and through other pastors operating on the ground like Henri Manen, then on the Vichy antisemitic laws through articles found in the Swiss Protestant Press and in internal French Protestant churches texts, like the Pomeyrol theses.

=== Forerunner of conscientious objection in France ===
With a few of his fellow Protestant theology students, Jacques Martin was a pionnier of pacifism in France; in 1923, he was the first editor of the review of Mouvement international de la réconciliation (MIR), the French branch of the International Fellowship of Reconciliation. At his two trials, Jacques Martin was defended by solicitor André Philip, who also defended Camille Rombault and Philippe Vernier. All these trials for draft dodging made big headlines in 1932 and 1933. André Philip used them as platforms for conscientious objectors, developing his arguments further at each trial. He called upon pastors such as Marc Boegner, Henri Nick, André Trocmé and Charles Westphal and leading intellectuals such as Marc Sangnier, Jean Guehenno and Julien Benda. These trials were a wake-up call for French society and foremost for the French Protestants who not only became more visible on the national scene at this occasion but whose internal opinion was also shifted at the same time. In 1948, the French Reformed Church officially adopted the position that conscientious objection was legitimate and requested the State to grant a legal status to conscientious objectors; the French Catholic Church will wait until 1965 to take the same position.

== See also ==
- List of peace activists
