= Christian Socialist Fellowship =

Former international religious society

- Formation: 1906
- Founded at: Louisville, Kentucky
- Type: Nonprofit
- Legal status: Defunct
- Region served: International
- Fields: Christian socialism
- Main organ: The Christian Socialist

Christian Socialist Fellowship was an international religious society of Protestant ministers and other believers in Christian socialist principles. It was formed at Louisville, Kentucky, U.S. in 1906, for the purpose of "permeating the churches, denominations, and other religious institutions with the social message of Jesus; to show that Socialism is the necessary economic expression of the Christian life; to end the class struggle by establishing industrial democracy, and to hasten the reign of justice and brotherhood upon earth."

The Christian Socialist Fellowship was one of the many organizations in England and the U.S. devoted to the propagation of the social religious teachings. Charles Kingsley, Archbishop Whately, Bishop van Ketteler, and Bishop Fripple were clergymen both Protestant and Catholic, who lead the movement In Europe. Drs, Lyman Abbott, Washington Gladden, and Professor Ely were leaders in the movement in the U.S. Out of the broad term "Christian Socialism" some half dozen organizations evolved, But the Christian Socialist Fellowship was the most active at present of any of these.

Membership was open to all who agreed to the objectives of the fellowship. "The Golden Rule Instead of the Rule of Gold" is the slogan of the organization. For a number of years, the Fellowship published The Christian Socialist at Chicago, Illinois.

== History ==
The Fellowship was formed at Louisville, Kentucky, U.S. in 1906. Starting in the first place chiefly by Unitarians, its membership embraced many Methodists, Presbyterians, Baptists, Lutherans, Congregationalists, Universalists and even Roman Catholics.

The Christian Socialist Fellowship set itself the task of removing prejudice by showing the followers that Socialism presented the most scientific and wise plan so far devised, for conforming modern industry and business to the teachings of Christianity. The convictions impelled the members of the Fellowship to carry on their work of persuasion and appeal to an arousing religious conscience toward social problems. The object of the Fellowship, as specified in its constitution was "To permeate churches, denominations and other religious institutions with the social message of Jesus; to show that Socialism is the necessary economic expression of the Christian life; to end the class struggle by establishing industrial democracy, and to hasten the reign of justice and brotherhood upon earth."

As showing the relation of the Fellowship to the Socialist party, the following resolution addressed to that body was important: "As active members of the Socialist party we thoroughly accept the economic interpretation of social and political causes, and have no desire to qualify it by any revisionist demand; and we are fully convinced that, as a matter of policy, the party ought strictly to avoid every form of religious and anti-religious theory or dogma on the lecture platform and in the party publications; and that such opinion should be regarded as a private matter, every one having the fullest liberty of belief and expression as an individual. In other words, that the Socialist party stands for economic and in no sense whatever for religious or anti-religious propaganda."

The importance of this resolution was constituted in a two-fold way. In the first place, attempts were made in the U.S. as well as in other countries, by a few members of the party, to force upon the Socialist movement the brand of "atheism" which the ellowship firmly combated. In the second place, the so-called "Christian Socialist" movements in European countries, Austria and Denmark, for example, were sometimes vehemently hostile to genuine Socialism, and those masquerading as sympathizers. The U.S. movement, therefore, had to overcome a fear on the part of old members of the Socialist party, that the Fellowship intended to do all it could to break down the proletarian revolution already far advanced. The Fellowship did well to express its clear-cut position on both these issues.

== Organ ==
The burden of editing and financing The Christian Socialist in the days when it struggled for its existence, and the toil of organizing the Fellowship, were exceedingly heavy. To Rev. Edward Ellis Carr, (Note: The Socialist Party of Cook County, Illinois, represented by its delegate committee at a meeting held in 1911, expelled from its membership the Rev. Edward Ellis Carr. Cost lost a pitched battle with the officials because of his attempt at cleansing the National Headquarters which had been freely characterized as "The Harem".) minister of the Methodist church, and his wife were instrumental in this work. Although receiving a large salary from the parish he was serving, Rev. Carr left all to labor for Socialism, and though always supported by his wife, he was obliged for some years to fight for existence for himself and family.

== International spread ==
Successful conferences of the Fellowship during 1908 were conducted in New York City, Baltimore, Asbury Park, New Jersey, and Old Orchard, Maine, and a tent was erected and maintained through the summer at Coney Island, presenting lectures and entertainments bearing upon Socialism. By 1909, the Fellowship had district secretaries in 26 states, the District of Columbia and the province of New Brunswick, Canada, and was represented by its membership in 35 states and three territories of the U.S., as well as in four Canadian provinces. Chapters, or "centers" were established wherever feasible, to carry on the educational and propaganda work of the Fellowship among the local religious bodies, to provide for the discussion of social and economic questions from a religious viewpoint, to distribute literature, arrange for lectures, extend the circulation of The Christian Socialist and perform any other work that properly comes within the province of the organization according to its constitution.

As a result of Carr's work in Europe during the summer of 1907, the Fellowship was organized in England and France. The first British conference was held in London. A conference was held in France, and the members of the Fellowship there issued a paper called The Hope of the World. In Germany and German Switzerland a strong coterie of Socialist ministers, including Pastors Herman Kutter and Paul Pflueger of Zurich, Ragaz of Basel, Liederben of Berlin, and many others, inaugurated a similar movement, with the purpose to issue a Christian-Socialist paper. Under the leadership of Giovanni Meille, at Naples, a Christian Socialist paper called L'Avanguardia appeared.

== Annual conferences ==
The Fellowship's early conferences included:

- 1st - Louisville, Kentucky - June XX-18, 1906
- 2nd - Chicago, Illinois - June 1-4, 1907
- 3rd - New York City, New York - May 28-31, 1908
- 4th - Toledo, Ohio - May 28-30, 1909
- 5th - Pittsburgh, Pennsylvania - April 21-24, 1910

== Selected works ==
- Songs of the Christian Socialist Fellowship: As Used by the Third National Christian Socialist Fellowship Conference, New York, May 28th-31st, 1908 (text)
