= Fritz Schulz (footballer) =

German footballer

Personal information
- Date of birth: 9 November 1886
- Date of death: 5 March 1918 (aged 31)
- Position: Forward

Senior career*
Years	Team	Apps	(Gls)
- Hertha BSC

International career
1909	Germany	1	(0)
- * Club domestic league appearances and goals

Fritz Schulz (9 November 1886 – 5 March 1918) was a German international footballer.
