= Fritz W. Schulz =

German painter

Friedrich Wilhelm Schulz, alias Fritz W. Schulz, (2 April 1884, in Berlin – 12 June 1962, in Hamburg) was a German marine artist and illustrator of the 20th century.

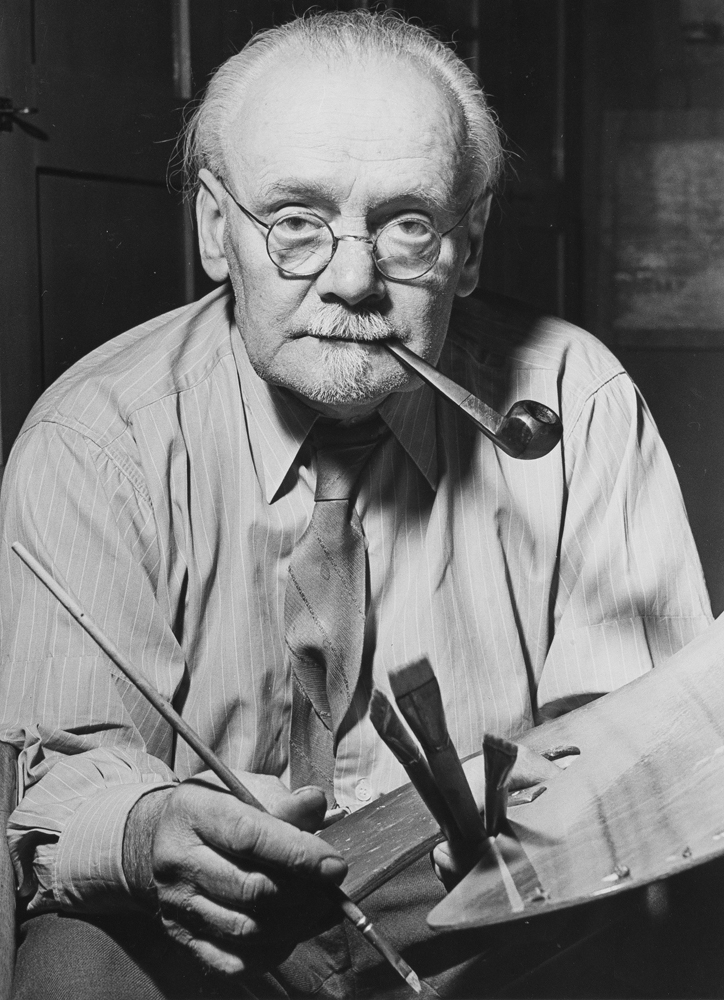
Fritz W. Schulz in seinem Atelier 1955

== Life and work ==
=== Education ===
In 1907, at age 23, Friedrich Wilhelm Schulz, entered the 'Berlin academy for the arts', Charlottenburg. His teachers were Max Schäfer, M. L. Körte, Hanke, Paul Friedrich Meyerheim and Carl Saltzmann. He also studied in Paris with Théophile Steinlen.

=== World War I ===
In 1909, Schulz was appointed Second Lieutenant in the German Army reserve and was stationed with the 24th Infantry Regiment, in Neuruppin. Sent directly to hostilities in 1914, Schulz was wounded and spent the remainder of World War I in the air services as an airman, hangar officer and Captain.

=== Family ===
In 1914, Schulz married Martha Elise Maria Kühn (24 February 1888, Neuruppin - 10 December 1966, Hamburg). They had two daughters; Ilse Agnes Piper, née Schulz (15 August 1915 - 13 September 2006, Hamburg) and Käthe Luise Schulze-Wenck, née Schulz (16 December 1916 - 30 September 2010, Itzstedt).

=== The Berlin studios ===
Schulz lived in Berlin and had several studios there; at Holsteiner Ufer, in the Wilsnackerstrasse and lastly in the Kantstrasse. He painted under his pseudonym, "Fritz W. Schulz" and marked his paintings with his initials 'F.S.W'. At the height of his career, Schulz rarely took part in art exhibitions and refused to join the NSDAP.

=== World War II ===
In 1945, in the Second World War, when Berlin was bombed, Schulz and his family moved to Neuruppin and from there to Apenrade, Denmark. From 6 June 1945 till 24 October 1948, Schulz and his family lived in the refugee camp at Oxböl, Denmark, where Schulz devoted his time to the promotion of the arts and to cultural education. During this time he drew maps for school lessons and worked as a teacher in the camp. In 1948, the family was admitted to the French zone of Germany and lived in an apartment in Aldingen. On 7 March 1949, Schulz was relieved from the jurisdiction III, Az. 16/KW/2091.

=== Postwar career ===
Schulz moved to Stuttgart, Germany in 1951 and in 1955 to Hamburg where he joined the Sezession. His works can be found in the 'Museum of Marine Science' in Berlin.

== Journeys ==
- 1925 – with the German fleet on the liner Elsass to Norway
- 1931 – to Galveston, Texas

== Estate ==
Schulz's estate is managed by his three grandsons, Joachim, Hellmut and Jürgen Schulze-Wenck.

== Selected works ==
- SMS-Emden at the Museum of Oceanography, Berlin.
- Niobe at the Museum of Oceanography, Berlin.
- 1933: "Franz Klasen" for the Deutsch-Amerikanische Petroleum Gesellschaft (DAPG) in Berlin.
- 1933: "C.A. Mowinckel" for DAPG, Paris.
- 1933: "Andromeda" for director Herzer, DAPG, Berlin.
- 1933: "Andromeda" - drawing for DAPG, Hamburg.
- 1942: "Herren des Atlantik" exhibited and awarded in "Das Meer".

== Gallery ==
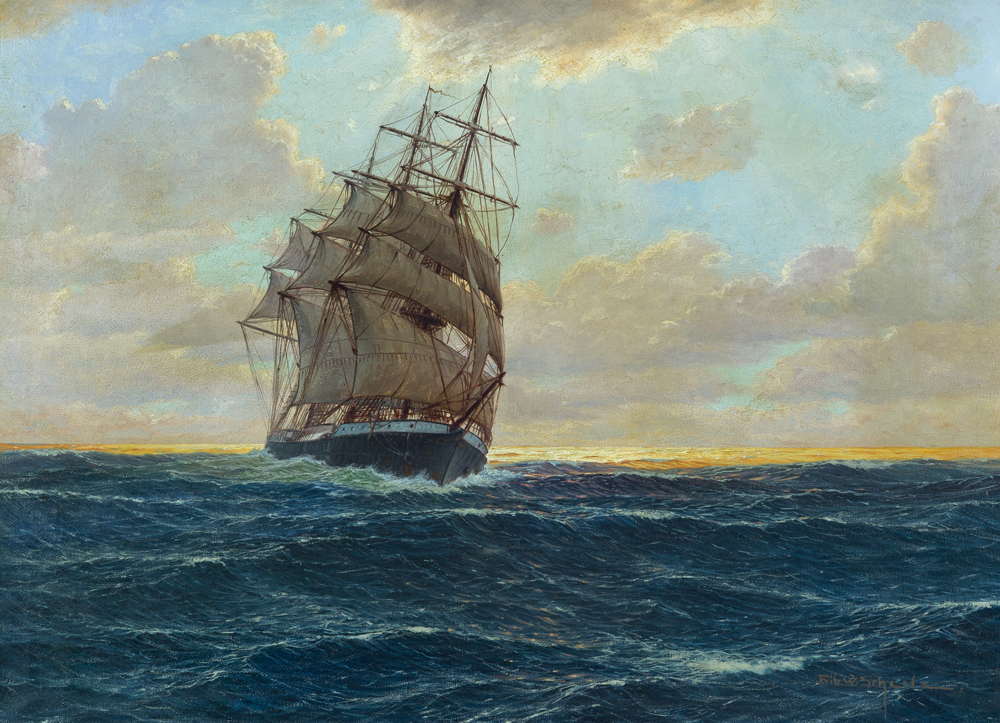
Dreimaster auf See

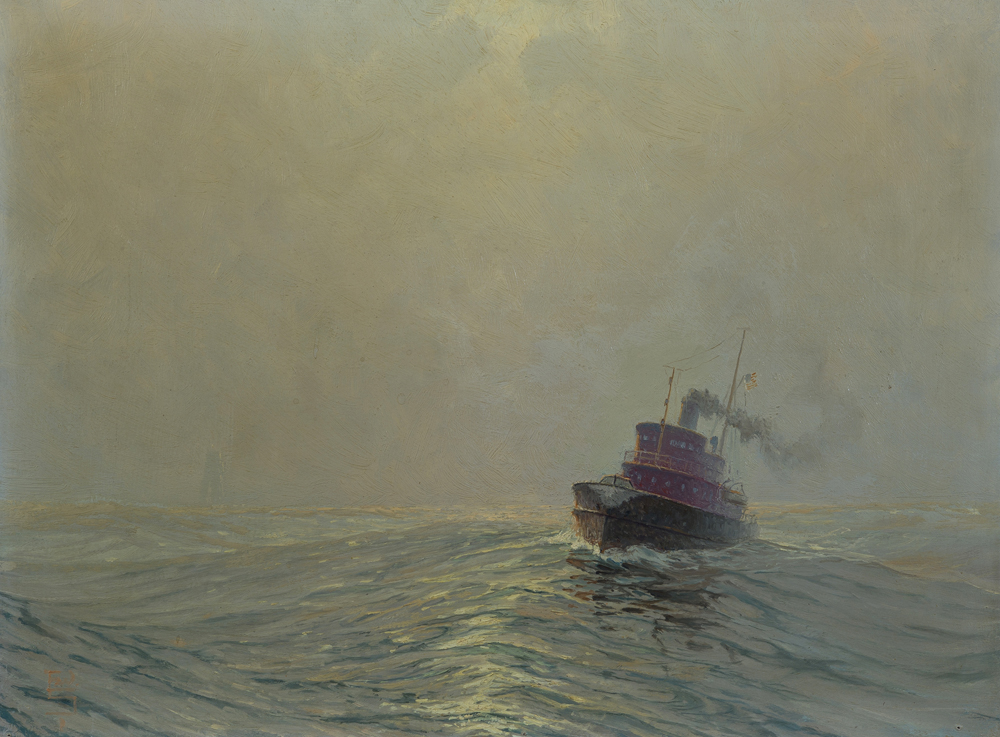
Auf der Neufundlandbank

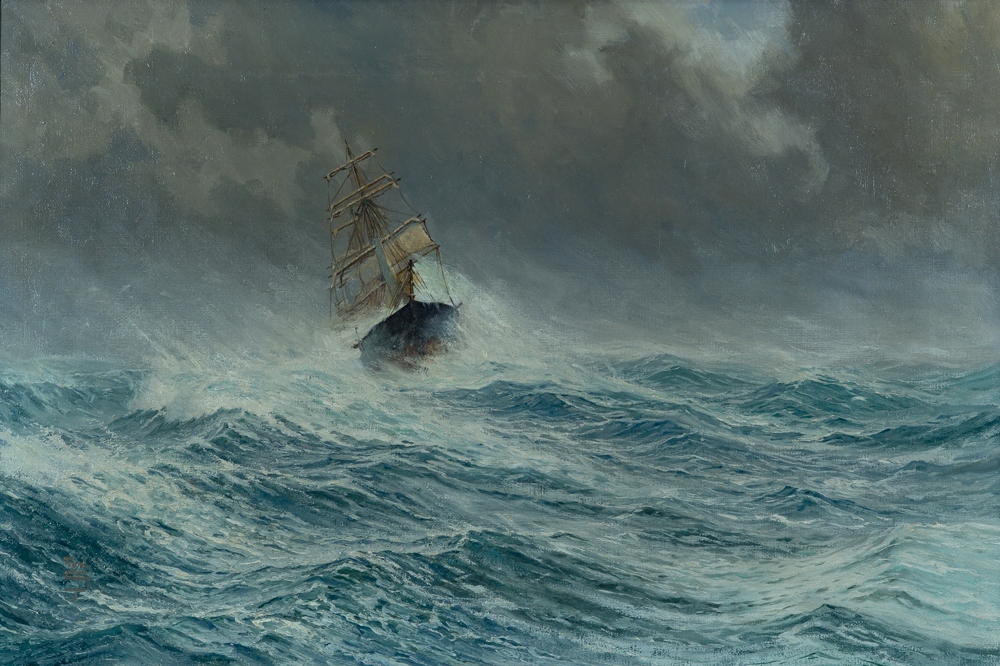
Sturmwind

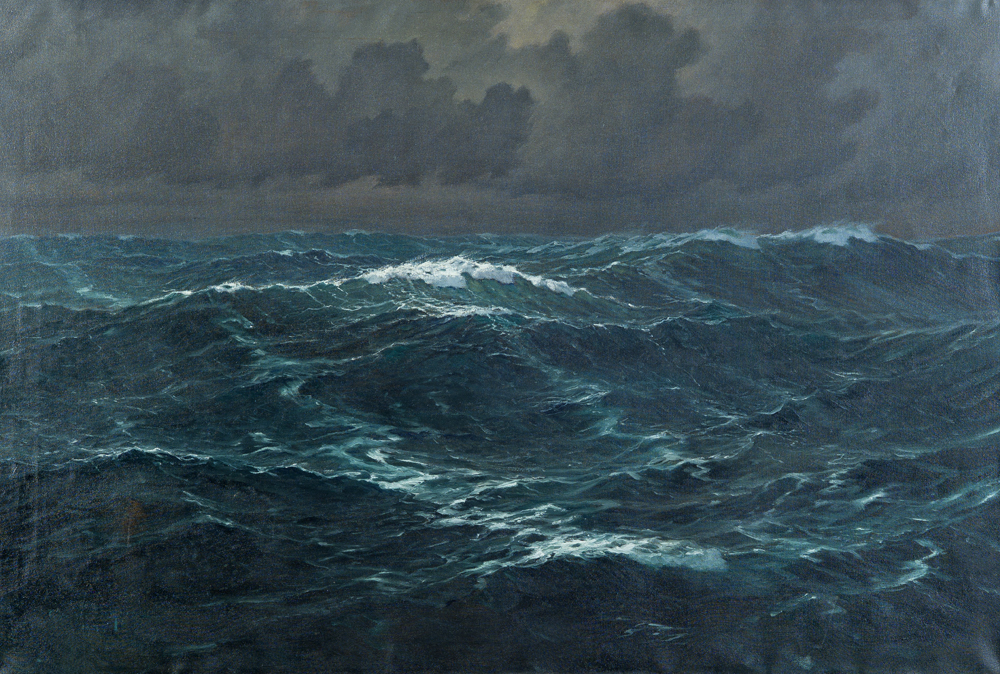
Tosende See

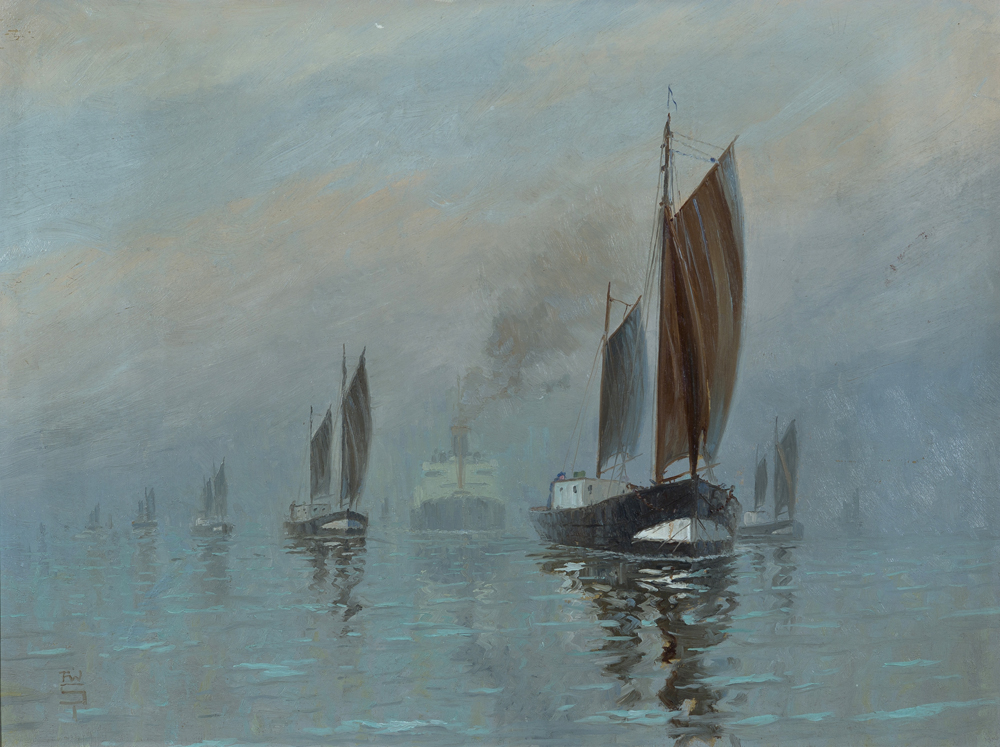
Schiffe im Nebel
