= Fritz Schulz (jurist) =

German historian (1879–1957)

Fritz Schulz (16 June 1879 – 12 November 1957) was a German jurist and legal historian. He was one of the 20th century's most important scholars in the field of Roman Law. The Nazis forced him to leave Germany, and to emigrate to England, due to his political stances and his Jewish origins.

== Life ==
Schulz was born in Bunzlau, Lower Silesia, German Empire (now Boleslawiec, Poland). Schulz' father was a Protestant. His mother came from a Jewish family. She converted to Christianity when Fritz was a small boy. Schulz grew up in his native town in Lower Silesia and studied law in Berlin and Breslau (now Wrocław) from 1899 to 1902, when he passed the First State Examination in Law. He received the grade of Doctor iuris from the University of Breslau in 1905. In the same year, Schulz obtained the habilitation at the University of Freiburg in Breisgau. In 1910, Schulz was appointed to a full professorship in Innsbruck (Austria). From Innsbruck, Schulz moved on to posts in Kiel (1912), Göttingen (1916) and Bonn (1923). During his time in Göttingen, Schulz actively supported the Deutsche Demokratische Partei, a left-of-center liberal party, which was among the staunchest supporters of the fragile democratic system in Germany.

In 1931, Schulz accepted a call to the University of Berlin. At the time, a professorship in Berlin was considered the most prestigious post a legal scholar could achieve in his career.

However, Schulz's brilliant academic career was brutally interrupted when it had just reached its peak. In 1934, Schulz was forcibly transferred to the University of Frankfurt am Main and then forced to retirement in 1935. In spite of this, Schulz stayed in Germany. He remained active in scholarly pursuits, traveling to the United States in 1936 to speak at the Riccobono Seminar at the Catholic University of America on the topic "Invention of the Science of Roman Law at Rome." Only in 1939 he emigrated, first to the Netherlands and then to Oxford (England). In Oxford, Schulz managed to survive due to financial support from various sources including Oxford University Press and the Rockefeller Foundation.

Schulz did not return to stay in Germany after the war. In 1947, he became a British subject. Schulz did, however, give a series of guest lectures at German universities after the war.

In 1949 received an honorary doctorate from the University of Frankfurt am Main. He was honoured with a Festschrift at the occasion of his 70th birthday. Schulz also became Honorary Professor at the University of Bonn (1951) and member of the Accademia Nazionale dei Lincei in Rome (1952). He died in Oxford.

Werner Flume, one of Germany's most influential jurists in the second half of the 20th century, is a pupil of Fritz Schulz.

== Scholarly achievements ==
Schulz is best known today for his vivid and very readable works on Roman law and Roman legal science. Even though he followed the prevalent scientific trend of his day and tended to assume a large number of interpolations in the Roman texts, his contributions are still valuable and are cited frequently. His book "System der Rechte auf den Eingriffserwerb", published in 1909, is still seen as an important contribution to the German Law of Unjustified Enrichment today.

== Works ==
- Sabinus-Fragmente in Ulpians Sabinus-Commentar (Halle: M. Niemeyer, 1906)
- System der Rechte auf den Eingriffserwerb in: Archiv für die civilistische Praxis, vol. 105 (1909)
- Einführung in das Studium der Digesten (Tübingen: Verlag von J. C. B. Mohr (Paul Siebeck), 1916)
- Die epitome Ulpiani des Codex vaticanus reginæ 1128, edited by F. Schulz (Bonn: A. Marcus und E. Weber, 1926)
- Prinzipien des Römischen Rechts, Vorlesungen gehalten an der Universität Berlin von Fritz Schulz (München – Leipzig: Verlag Duncker & Humblot, 1934)
- History of Roman Legal Science (Oxford: Clarendon Press, 1946)
- Classical Roman Law (Oxford: Clarendon Press, 1951, 1954 printing)
- Geschichte der römischen Rechtswissenschaft (Weimar: H. Böhlaus Nachfolger, 1961)
- Thomae Diplovatatii Liber de claris iuris consultis. Pars posterior, curantibus F. Schulz, H. Kantorowicz, G. Rabotti (Bononiae: Institutum Gratianum, c1968)
