= Tijdschrift voor Rechtsgeschiedenis =

- Discipline: Legal history
- Language: Dutch, French, English, German

Publication details
- History: 1918-present
- Publisher: Brill Publishers
- Frequency: Quarterly
- Open access: Hybrid
- Impact factor: 0.114 (2017)

Standard abbreviations
- ISO 4: Tijdschr. Rechtsgeschiedenis

Indexing
- ISSN: 0040-7585 (print); 1571-8190 (web)
- LCCN: 25019316
- OCLC no.: 299863005

Links
- Journal homepage

The Tijdschrift voor Rechtsgeschiedenis/Revue d'Histoire du Droit/The Legal History Review is a quarterly peer-reviewed academic journal covering legal history. It was established in 1918 and is published by Brill Publishers.

== Abstracting and indexing ==
The journal is abstracted and indexed in:

- Arts & Humanities Citation Index
- EBSCO databases
- L'Année philologique
- Modern Language Association Database
- Scopus
- Social Sciences Citation Index

According to the Journal Citation Reports, the journal has a 2017 impact factor of 0.114.
