= Canadian Review of Comparative Literature =

- Discipline: Comparative Literature
- Language: English, French
- Edited by: Irene Sywenky

Publication details
- History: 1974–present
- Publisher: Canadian Comparative Literature Association (Canada)
- Frequency: Quarterly

Standard abbreviations
- ISO 4: Can. Rev. Comp. Lit.

Indexing
- ISSN: 0319-051X (print); 1913-9659 (web)

Links
- Journal homepage

Canadian Review of Comparative Literature (French: Revue Canadienne de Littérature Comparée) is a quarterly peer-reviewed academic journal of comparative literature. It was established in 1974 by the Canadian Comparative Literature Association. The journal primarily publishes articles in English and French, but occasionally accepts articles in German, Russian and Italian. The editor-in-chief is Irene Sywenky (University of Alberta), the founding editor was M. V. Dimić (1974–1998).

== Abstracting and indexing ==
The journal is abstracted and indexed in the following bibliographic databases:

- L'Année philologique
- DIALNET
- Emerging Sources Citation Index
- Periodicals Index Online
- MLA - Modern Language Association Database
- Scopus
