= St. George's Anglican Church (Colorado Springs, Colorado) =

Anglican church in Colorado, United States

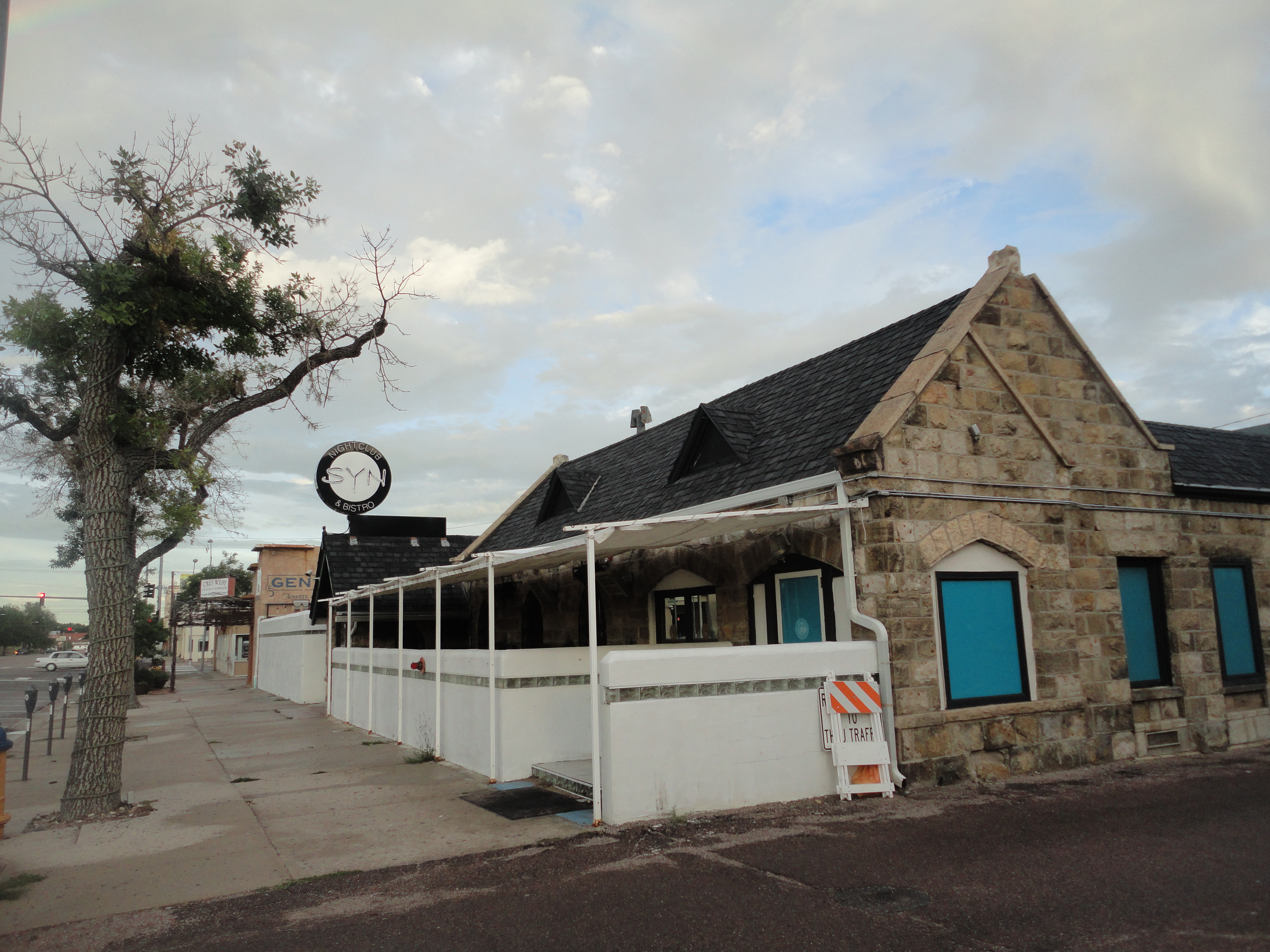
- St. George's building pictured in 2010 under the sign of Syn nightclub
- St. George's Anglican Church
- 38°50′00″N 104°49′14″W
- Location: 217 East Pikes Peak Avenue, Colorado Springs, Colorado
- Country: United States
- Denomination: Anglican Reformed Catholic Church
- Previous denomination: Anglican Church in North America
- Website: stgac.org

History
- Founded: 2009
- Founder: Donald Armstrong
- Dedicated: 2011

Architecture
- Style: Gothic Revival
- Years built: 1873–1874

Administration
- Diocese: St. Andrew

Clergy
- Bishop: Michael Williams
- Rector: Joseph R. Odell

St. George's Anglican Church is an Anglican church in downtown Colorado Springs, Colorado, United States. The church was formed in 2009 when clergy and members of Grace and St. Stephen's Episcopal Church separated from the Episcopal Church during the Anglican realignment. St. George's was part of the Anglican Church in North America. In 2011, it acquired a former nightclub in Colorado Springs that included the remaining 1874 structure of Grace Episcopal Church, which merged with St. Stephen's in 1923.

== History ==
The longtime rector of Grace and St. Stephen's, Donald Armstrong, said he did not expect the congregation to divide over the election of openly gay cleric Gene Robinson as an Episcopal bishop in 2003. In January 2007, the bishop of Colorado initiated an investigation into Armstrong over allegations that included misapplication of funds and temporarily suspended him from ministry. In March 2007, hours before Bishop Robert O'Neill issued the ecclesiastical equivalent of an indictment for theft and mishandling of funds, the vestry of Grace and St. Stephen's voted to disaffiliate from the Episcopal Diocese of Colorado and join the Church of Nigeria–affiliated Convocation of Anglicans in North America (CANA). Grace and St. Stephen's leaders said they were upset about the theological direction of the Episcopal Church, including its doctrine on homosexuality, as well as the investigation of Armstrong. The CANA-affiliated group initially maintained possession of the Grace and St. Stephen's building. Following an Episcopal Church trial that found him guilty of financial wrongdoing, including the theft of nearly $400,000 from the church, Armstrong was deposed by Bishop O'Neill in October 2007.

St. George's Anglican Church was organized under that name in March 2009 after a Colorado court awarded the Grace and St. Stephen's building to the Episcopal congregation. St. George's vacated the space in April of that year and began worshiping at a local school with an average attendance of about 200. Following the creation of the Anglican Church in North America, St. George's became a member.

Shortly after St. George's formation, a grand jury in El Paso County indicted Armstrong on charges of felony theft. In September 2010, Armstrong pleaded no contest to a single felony and entered an Alford plea to a misdemeanor charge and was sentenced to four years of probation. The senior warden of St. George's said the church believed Armstrong was innocent and that an audit conducted for St. George's found no wrongdoing. The warden also said St. George's spent hundreds of thousands of dollars fighting the charges against Armstrong.

Two years after its formation, in 2011, St. George's purchased the Syn nightclub on East Pikes Peak Avenue in downtown Colorado Springs for $975,000. The building included some architectural remnants of the original Grace Episcopal Church that had been vacated in 1925 when Grace and St. Stephen's formed. Amid renovations, the building was dedicated in August 2011.

== Architecture ==
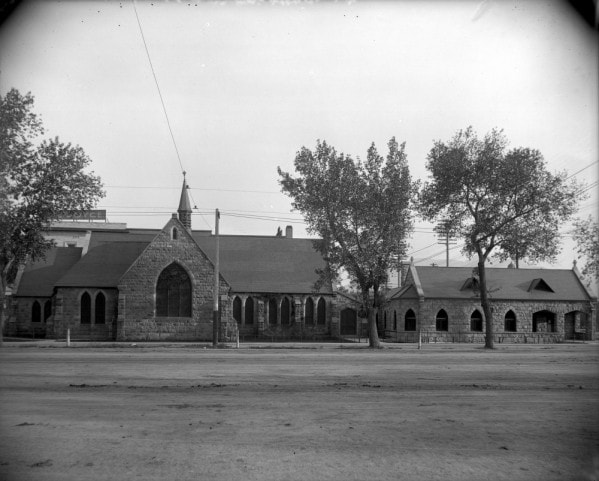
Grace Episcopal Church photographed in 1910. The left-hand parts of the building have been demolished.

St. George's building includes the remnants of the original Grace Episcopal Church, which was built in 1873 and was one of the first church buildings in Colorado Springs. It was built on land donated by Colorado Springs founder William Jackson Palmer.

Following Grace Church's merger with St. Stephen's in 1923, Episcopalians vacated the building. Starting it 1929, it was used as a restaurant called the Chapel Inn that maintained the former church's Gothic Revival architecture. The restaurant was named the Village Inn in the 1930s and passed through a long series of owners. The owners of the Village Inn sold the restaurant in 1961 to focus on their separate Village Inn pancake house chain.

A large part of the nave was demolished and replaced with a bus terminal. The restaurant closed permanently in 1990. The building later became a nightclub with a series of names ("Eden", "13 Pure" and eventually "Syn") based on the church architecture. In 2011, the building was put up for sale after revocation of the club's liquor license over an altercation.

== See also ==
- Grace and St. Stephen's Episcopal Church
