= Jerry Winterrowd =

Bishop of Colorado

The Right Reverend William Jerry Winterrowd D.D.
- Bishop of Colorado
- Church: Episcopal Church
- Diocese: Colorado
- Elected: September 29, 1990
- In office: 1991–2004
- Predecessor: William Frey
- Successor: Robert John O'Neill

Orders
- Ordination: April 25, 1964 by Girault M. Jones
- Consecration: January 19, 1991 by Edmond L. Browning

Personal details
- Born: July 24, 1938 (age 87) Shreveport, Louisiana, United States
- Denomination: Anglican
- Parents: William Perry Winterrowd & Ruth Davis
- Spouse: Ann LaBarre (m. 1964)
- Education: General Theological Seminary
- Alma mater: Centenary College of Louisiana

William Jerry Winterrowd (born July 24, 1938) was bishop of the Episcopal Diocese of Colorado from 1991 to 2004. He was elected in 1990 and retired in January 2004.

== Biography ==
Winterrowd was born on July 24, 1938, in Shreveport, Louisiana, the son of William Perry Winterrowd (1910-1982) and Ruth Davis (1912-1971). He studied at the Centenary College of Louisiana, and then at the General Theological Seminary. On August 25, 1964, he married Ann LaBarre.

He was ordained deacon on June 15, 1963, and priest on April 25, 1964. He then served as curate at St James' Church in Alexandria, Louisiana till 1965, when he joined the Episcopal Mission Society in New York where he ministered to abandoned children till 1975. In 1976, he became the Executive Director of the Episcopal Community Services in the Episcopal Diocese of Pennsylvania, while in 1980, he was appointed in the same position but within the Diocese of Minnesota. Whilst in Minneapolis, he served as interim rector of Gethsemane Church between 1981 and 1983. In 1985, he became rector of St James the Less' Church in Scarsdale, New York, where he remained till 1991.

Winterrowd was elected as the ninth Bishop of Colorado on September 29, 1990, and was consecrated on January 19, 1991. He retired in January 2004.
