= Grace and St. Stephen's Episcopal Church =

Historic Episcopal church in Colorado, US

- Grace & Saint Stephen's Episcopal Church
- U.S. National Register of Historic Places
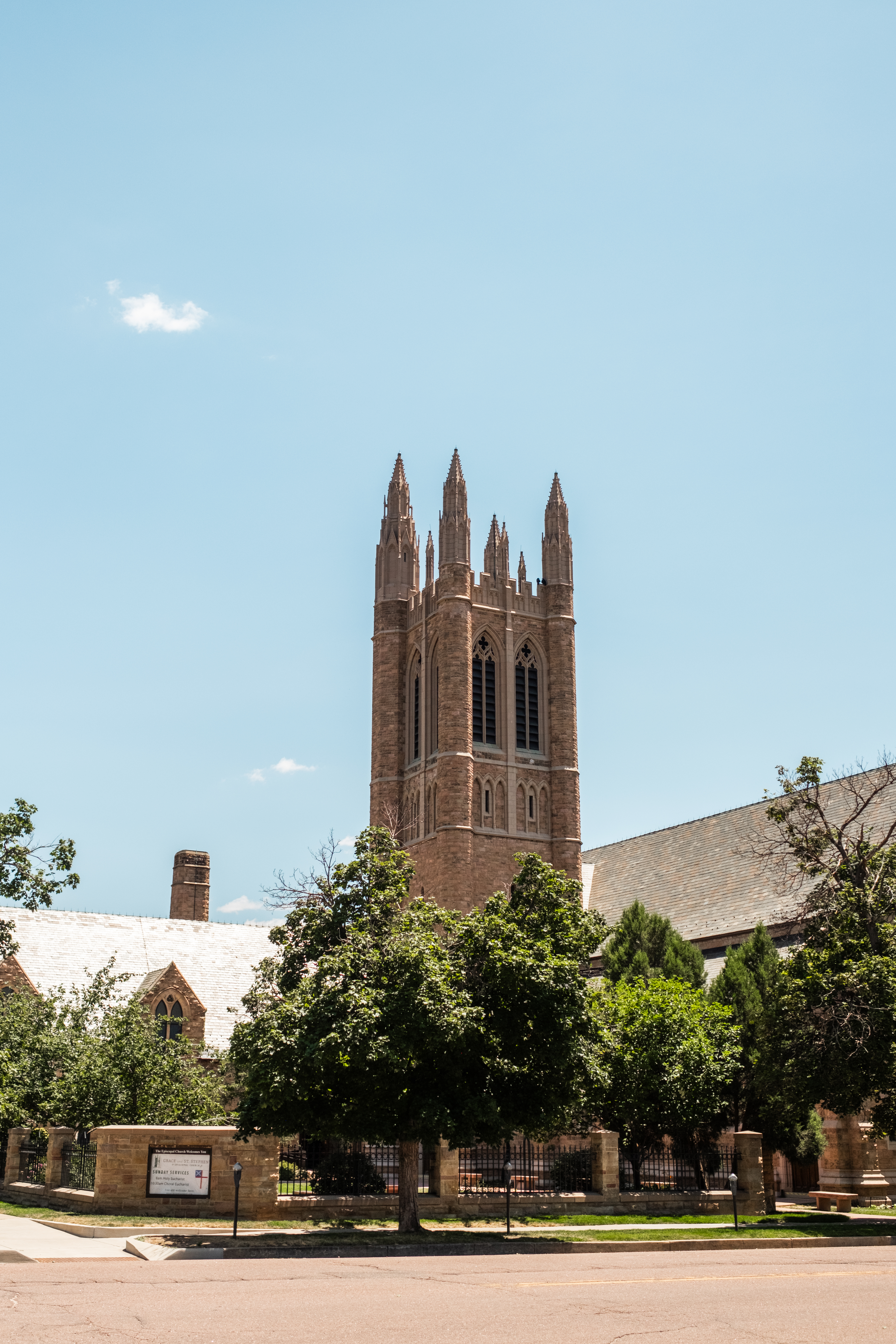
- Grace & Saint Stephen's Episcopal Church at the corner of North Tejon and Monument Streets

- Location within Colorado
- Location: 631 N. Tejon Street
- Coordinates: 38°50′36″N 104°49′21″W
- Built: 1926
- Architect: Frohman, Robb and Little
- NRHP reference No.: 11000902
- Added to NRHP: December 15, 2011
- Grace and St. Stephen's Episcopal Church
- Country: United States
- Denomination: Episcopal Church
- Website: gssepiscopal.org

Architecture
- Style: Gothic Revival

Specifications
- Materials: Rhyolite

Administration
- Diocese: Colorado

Clergy
- Rector: Robert Black

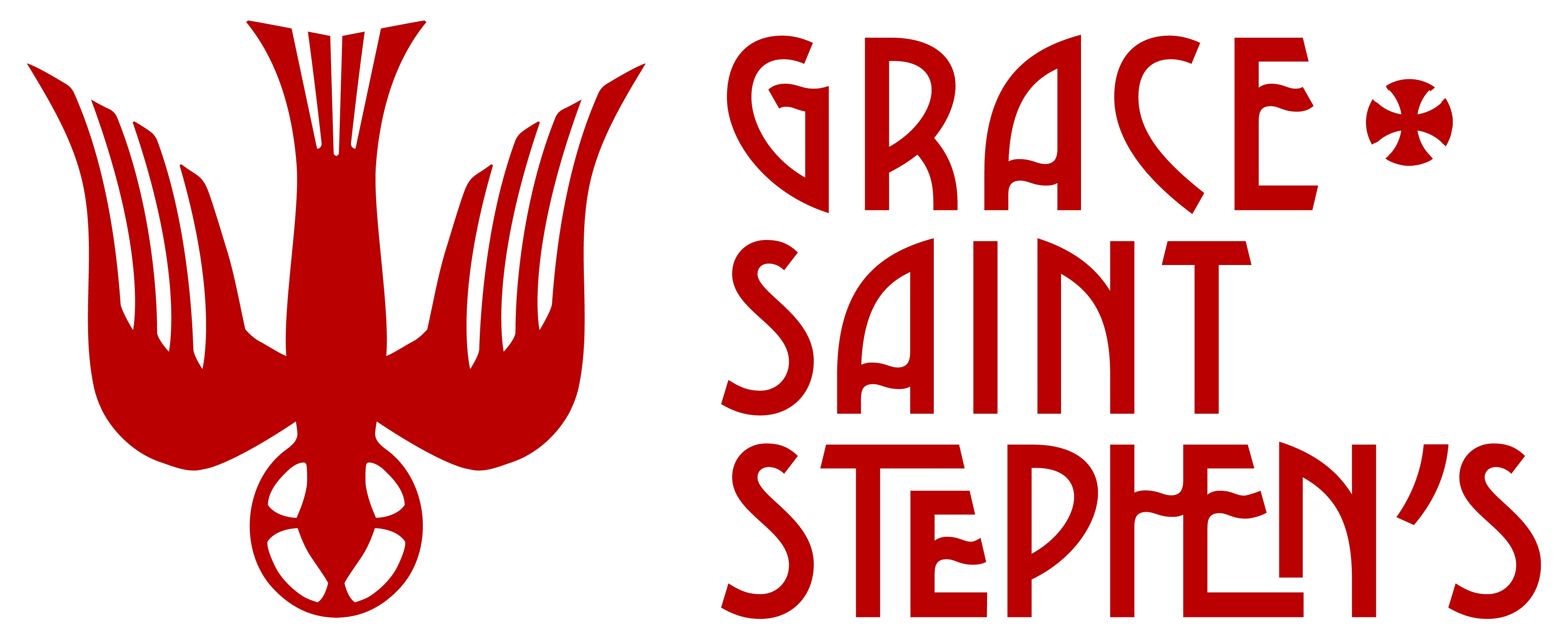
Logo for Grace & Saint Stephen's

Grace & Saint Stephen's Episcopal Church is a historic church in Colorado Springs, Colorado, United States. Its buildings—which include a parish hall, bell tower, sanctuary and educational wing built between 1894 and 1955—represent a cohesive and mature expression of Gothic Revival and Tudor Revival architecture and have been listed on the National Register of Historic Places since 2011. The congregation dates to 1872, when Grace Episcopal Church was formed as the first Episcopal church in Colorado Springs. This congregation split in 1893, forming St. Stephen's, which moved to the church's present-day site in 1895. The congregations reunited as Grace & Saint Stephen's in 1923 and completed the large Gothic Revival sanctuary in 1926. The congregation split again in 2007 during the Anglican realignment. After courts determined that the Episcopal Diocese of Colorado was the owner of the building, the former rector and a number of members formed a new church that met in a separate facility.

In 2021, the church reported 1,002 members; in 2023, it reported 803 members. No membership statistics were reported in 2024 national parochial reports. Average Sunday Attendance (ASA) reported by the church in 2024 was 253 persons. This was a relative decrease from ASA of 358 persons reported in 2019.

== History ==
=== Grace Episcopal Church ===
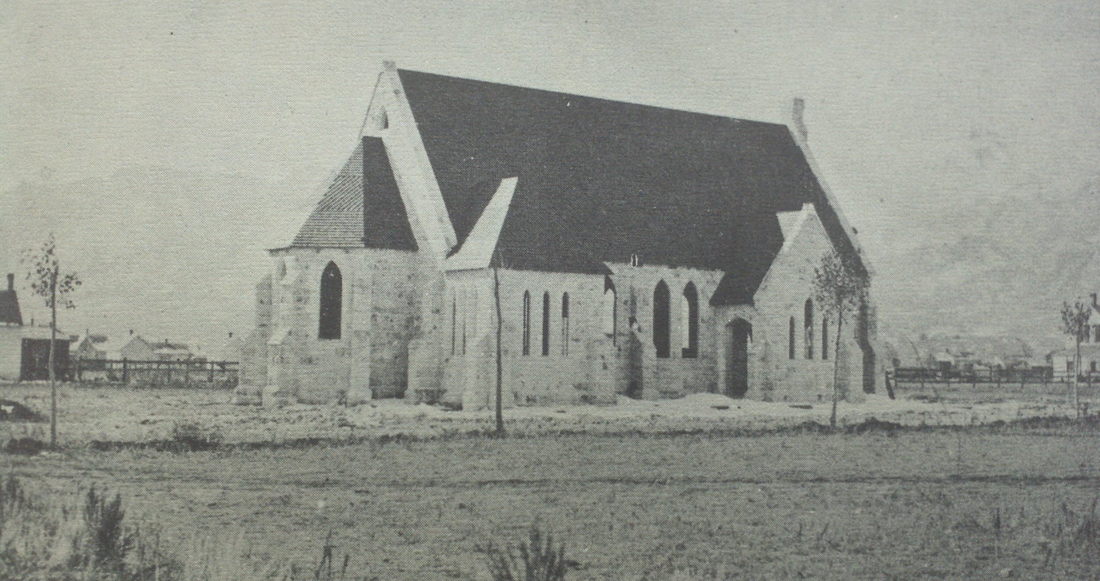
Grace Episcopal Church in 1874

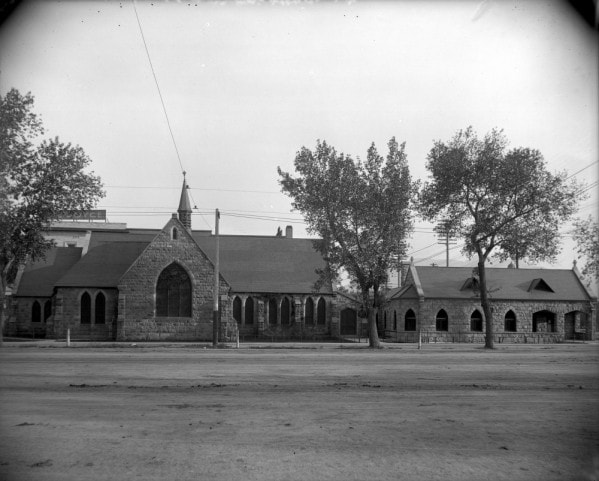
Grace Episcopal Church in 1910

Grace Episcopal Church dates to 1872, when Episcopal services were held in Foote's Hall. Fundraising for a permanent building began that year and the building of Grace Church was begun in 1873 on land donated by Colorado Springs founder William Jackson Palmer, who provided land for five churches in the city. It was one of the oldest churches in Colorado Springs. In 1891, the church added the north and south transepts and a cloister area, bringing its capacity to 600.

=== St. Stephen's Episcopal Church ===
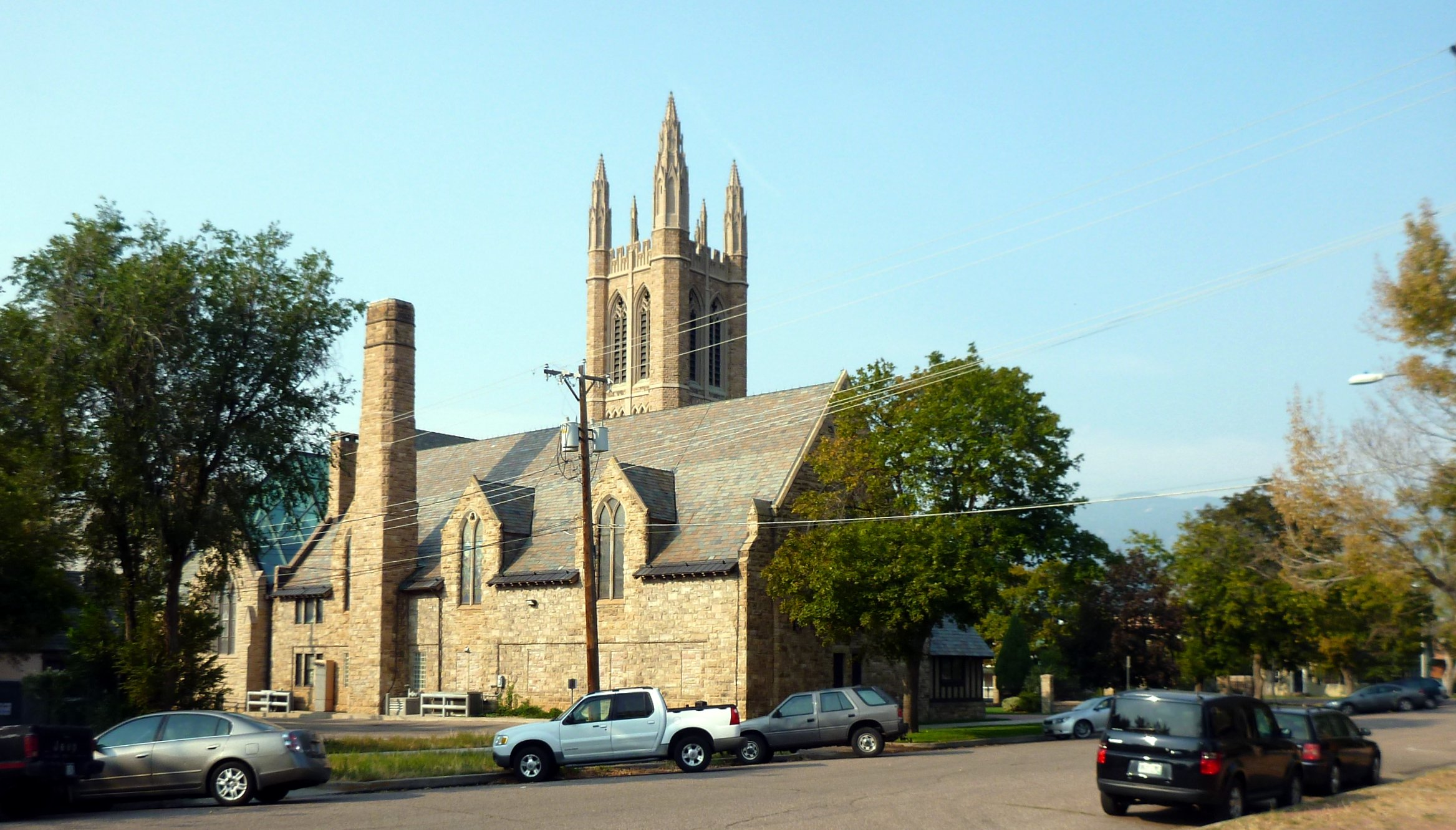
A 2012 view of the 1895 St. Stephen's chapel building

St. Stephen's was founded in 1893 by a group of Grace Church members who objected to high church practices. Beginning with around 30 members, St. Stephen's met in rented locations until its first building was completed. In 1894, mining magnate J. J. Hagerman donated a lot at the north end of downtown on North Tejon Street and Monument Street valued at $50,000. The congregation laid a cornerstone for a Gothic Revival church designed by Thomas MacLaren in November 1894. The congregation moved into the finished chapel in 1895.

Under rector Arthur Nelson Taft, St. Stephen's founded the Colorado Springs branch of the American Red Cross, a visiting nurse association and tuberculosis sanitariums. In 1908, St. Stephen's and Grace cooperated in establishing Epiphany Mission, the first Black Episcopal church in the area. (The mission eventually merged back into Grace & Saint Stephen's in 1956.)

=== Combined congregation ===
In 1923, with leaders believing that two congregations would be stronger together in a larger single building, the two congregations reunited as Grace & Saint Stephen's. They selected the St. Stephen's site and purchased adjacent land to build a new church, converting the previous church on the site into the present parish hall. They engaged the Boston firm of Frohman, Robb and Little, the designers of the National Cathedral in Washington, D.C., to design a new 500-seat church in a Gothic Revival cathedral style, which was completed in 1926 and consecrated in 1929 when the building's debt was paid off.

The local philanthropist Alice Bemis Taylor donated an organ to the church in 1928 on the condition that it hold a number of public concerts each year. She established an endowment for the organ's maintenance and for the organist's salary. Between 1949 and 1955, in two phases, the church completed a Tudor Revival educational wing to the south of the sanctuary designed by Edward Bunts. Amid the population growth of the Colorado Springs area, Grace & Saint Stephen's has been responsible for planting four other Episcopal congregations in the metro area.

=== Anglican realignment and church split ===
By the turn of the 21st century, Grace & Saint Stephen's had become the largest congregations in the Episcopal Diocese of Colorado and known as a theologically conservative congregation within the Episcopal Church. After openly gay cleric Gene Robinson was elected an Episcopal bishop in 2003, the longtime rector of Grace & Saint Stephen's, Donald Armstrong, initially said he did not expect the congregation to divide over the matter.

In January 2007, the bishop of Colorado initiated an investigation into Armstrong over allegations that included misapplication of funds and temporarily suspended him from ministry. In March 2007, hours before Bishop Robert O'Neill issued the ecclesiastical equivalent of an indictment for theft and mishandling of funds, the vestry of Grace & Saint Stephen's voted to disaffiliate from the Diocese of Colorado and join the Church of Nigeria–affiliated Convocation of Anglicans in North America (CANA). Grace & Saint Stephen's leaders said they were upset about the theological direction of the Episcopal Church, including its doctrine on homosexuality, as well as the investigation of Armstrong. The CANA-affiliated group initially maintained possession of the Grace & Saint Stephen's building. Following an Episcopal Church trial that found him guilty of financial wrongdoing, including the theft of nearly $400,000 from the church, Armstrong was deposed by Bishop O'Neill in October 2007. In May 2009, Armstrong was indicted on charges of felony theft. He pleaded no contest to a single felony and entered an Alford plea to a misdemeanor charge and was sentenced to four years of probation.

After two years of a civil lawsuit, a Colorado court in March 2009 awarded the Grace & Saint Stephen's building to the Episcopal congregation. The Armstrong-led group, now called St. George's Anglican Church, vacated the space in April of that year. Grace & Saint Stephen's resumed worshiping in the Tejon Street building with 600 at a Palm Sunday service. By 2011, St. George's had purchased the remnants of the original Grace Episcopal Church building in downtown Colorado Springs.

== Architecture ==
=== Chapel ===
The 1895 chapel building measured 97 by 41 feet. The end facing Monument Street to the north had a tall gable end featuring a set of four lancet windows. The two central windows of the north end are framed with colonnettes, which are marked with carved plaques inscribed with an "S" cipher for Saint Stephen, and the north gable features an embedded stone Latin cross. Three gabled dormer windows line the west side, with two on the east side. The dormers have pointed-arch openings with stained glass windows divided into three parts by mullions. The roof is of slate, steeply pitched.

The chapel seated 256 people. The sound end, facing away from Monument Street, was used as a parish house, including a guild room, choir room, vesting room, Sunday school rooms and a kitchen. A 1993 renovation turned the chapel and parish house in a fellowship hall, removing pews and flooring and repainting the plaster walls and ceilings. The alterations for the most part did not affect the exterior.

The exterior was faced with random-coursed grey lava rock quarried from Castle Rock, Colorado. In 1993, a vestibule was added to the north end of the chapel's west side.

=== Sanctuary and tower ===
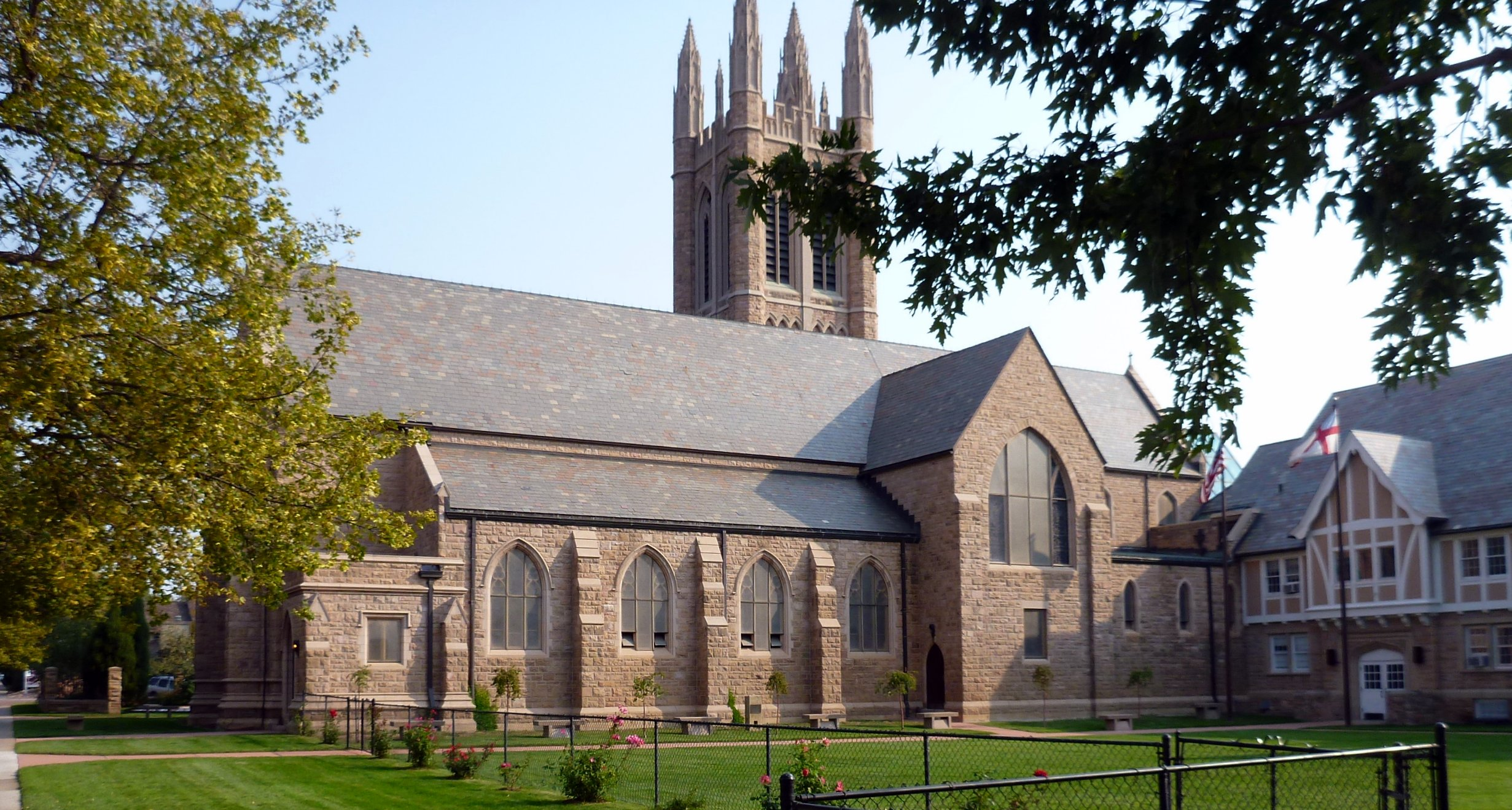
The south side of the sanctuary, with aisle and transept, with the educational wing to the right

The sanctuary, completed in 1926, represents a higher Gothic Revival variation. Its walls are coursed rhyolite rubble and its roof is steeply pitched slate, with coursed parapets at each end. A large lancet stained glass window dominates the sanctuary's west end, which has small vestibules on the north and south sides. The exterior of the east end is enclosed in a 1993 glass-roofed atrium addition that connects the original chapel, the sanctuary and the educational wing.

Each side of the sanctuary has an aisle with a shed roof. Each side aisle has four bays, each with a stained glass window, separated by buttresses. The south aisle terminates in the south transept, which also has a large dominating stained glass window. On the north side, the aisle terminates in a 90 feet (27 m) tower. Flat-roofed, three-bay side aisles continue east of the transept and tower, allowing clerestory lancet windows above the choir to the east end. The Grace & Saint Stephen's building includes 48 stained glass windows, which were placed throughout the 20th century.

Each corner of the bell tower has an octagonal pier with a crocket at the pinnacle. The tower has a crenellated parapet. Each side of the tower has two lancet arch openings with louvers. Stone arcades with colonettes are below the louvered openings. The north side of the tower features a large, lancet-arch sanctuary entrance marked by a chamfered stone surround and a stained glass transom. A statue of Saint Stephen sits in a niche above the tower entrance.

=== Educational wing ===
The two-story educational wing was built in Tudor Revival style. Its first phase (the basement and first floor) were completed in 1949 of coursed rusticated stone. The second floor, completed in 1955, overhangs the first story and is supported are sided with decorative half-timbering and stucco. The windows are wooden and double-hung, with stone surrounds on the first floor and wood surrounds on the second. Like the other parts of the building, the roof of the educational wing is steeply pitched and of slate.

== See also ==
- National Register of Historic Places listings in El Paso County, Colorado
- St. George's Anglican Church (Colorado Springs, Colorado)
