= Charles Olmstead =

Charles Olmstead may refer to:

- Charles Sanford Olmsted (1853–1918), also Olmstead, bishop of the Episcopal Diocese of Colorado
- Charles H. Olmstead (1837–1926), American Confederate Army officer
- Charles Tyler Olmstead (1842–1924), bishop of the Episcopal Diocese of Central New York

== See also ==
- Charles Olmsted (disambiguation)
