= Charles Olmsted =

Charles Olmsted may refer to:

- Charles Sanford Olmsted (1853–1918), bishop of the Episcopal Diocese of Colorado
- Charles M. Olmsted (1881–1948), American aeronautical engineer
- John Charles Olmsted (1852–1920), American landscape architect

== See also ==
- Charles Olmstead (disambiguation)
