= Fred Ingley =

English-American bishop

The Right Reverend Fred Ingley D.D., S.T.D.
- Bishop of Colorado
- Church: Episcopal Church
- Diocese: Colorado
- In office: 1938–1949
- Predecessor: Irving P. Johnson
- Successor: Harold L. Bowen
- Previous post: Coadjutor Bishop of Colorado (1921-1938)

Orders
- Ordination: February 17, 1907 by Cortlandt Whitehead
- Consecration: June 11, 1921 by Daniel S. Tuttle

Personal details
- Born: November 11, 1878 Staffordshire, England
- Died: March 1, 1947 (aged 80) Denver, Colorado, United States
- Buried: Fairmount Cemetery
- Denomination: Anglican
- Parents: Albert Ingley & Mary Bloomer
- Spouse: Eidth Mary Hansen (m. 1909)
- Children: 5

Frederick "Fred" Ingley (November 20, 1878 – February 15, 1951) was the fourth bishop of Colorado in the Episcopal Church from 1938 to 1949; previously coadjutor since 1921.

== Early life and education ==
Ingley was born on November 20, 1878, in Staffordshire, England, the son of Albert Ingley and Mary Bloomer. After emigrating to the United States with his parents, he was educated at the Pittsburgh public schools. He then studied at the Philadelphia Divinity School, graduating with a Bachelor of Divinity in 1906. In 1920 he was awarded a Doctor of Sacred Theology from the Philadelphia Divinity School, and in 1928 a Doctor of Divinity from Colorado College.

== Ordained ministry ==
Ingley was ordained deacon on June 17, 1906, and priest on February 17, 1907, by the Bishop of Pittsburgh Cortlandt Whitehead. Between 1906 and 1908, he served as deacon, and then priest-in-charge of St Mary's Church in Braddock, Pennsylvania, and between 1908 and 1917 as rector of St Matthew's Church in Kenosha, Wisconsin. In 1917, he became rector of St Mark's Church in Denver, Colorado, where he remained till 1921.

== Bishop ==
In 1921, Ingley was elected Coadjutor Bishop of Colorado, and was consecrated on June 11, 1921, at St John's Cathedral in Denver, Colorado, with Presiding Bishop Daniel S. Tuttle as chief consecrator. He succeeded as diocesan in 1938, and retired in 1949. He died on February 15, 1951, in Denver Colorado.

== Family ==
Ingley married Eidth Mary Hansen in 1909. They had 5 children, Mary, Elizabeth, Ruth, Jane, and Hansen.
