= Edwin Thayer =

Edwin Thayer may refer to:

- Edwin B. Thayer (1905–1989), bishop of the Episcopal Diocese of Colorado
- Edwin Pope Thayer (1864–1943), secretary of the United States Senate
