= Harold Bowen =

Harold Bowen may refer to:

- Harold G. Bowen Sr. (1883–1965), United States Navy admiral
- Harold L. Bowen (1886–1967), bishop of the Episcopal Diocese of Colorado
