= Kimberly Lucas =

Bishop of the Episcopal Church

The Right Reverend Kimberly Lucas
- Bishop of Colorado
- Church: Episcopal Church
- Diocese: Colorado
- Elected: October 27, 2018
- In office: 2019–present
- Predecessor: Robert John O'Neill

Orders
- Consecration: May 18, 2019 by Michael Curry

Personal details
- Born: Spring Lake, North Carolina, United States
- Denomination: Anglican
- Spouse: Mark Retherford
- Children: 4
- Education: Union Theological Seminary
- Alma mater: Wake Forest University

Kimberly "Kym" Lucas is the eleventh and current Bishop of Colorado in the Episcopal Church.

== Biography ==
She was consecrated as the eleventh bishop of the Episcopal Church in Colorado on 18 May 2019, at the Cathedral of St. John in the Wilderness. She was elected on the fourth ballot during the diocese's annual convention on 27 October 2018. Lucas is the first woman as well as the first African American to serve as bishop in the diocese.

Prior to her election as bishop, she was rector of St. Margaret's Episcopal Church in Washington, D.C since 2012. Previously, she was the rector of St. Ambrose Episcopal Church in Raleigh, North Carolina, from 2005 to 2011.

Lucas is originally from Spring Lake, North Carolina. She studied science and biology at Wake Forest University, and subsequently at Union Theological Seminary she studied for a master of divinity. Lucas is married to Mark Retherford and has four children.
