= William Frey (bishop) =

American bishop (1930–2020)

The Right Reverend William Carl Frey D.D.
- Bishop of Colorado
- Church: Episcopal Church
- Diocese: Colorado
- Elected: 1972
- In office: 1973–1990
- Predecessor: Edwin B. Thayer
- Successor: Jerry Winterrowd
- Previous posts: Missionary Bishop of Guatemala, El Salvador, & Honduras (1967-1971); Coadjutor Bishop of Colorado (1972-1973)

Orders
- Ordination: January 25, 1956 by Joseph Minnis
- Consecration: November 26, 1967 by John E. Hines

Personal details
- Born: February 26, 1930 Waco, Texas, United States
- Died: October 11, 2020 (aged 90) San Antonio, Texas, United States
- Denomination: Anglican
- Parents: Harry Frederick Frey & Ethel Oliver
- Spouse: Barbara Louise Martin (m. 1952; died 2014)
- Children: 5
- Education: Philadelphia Divinity School
- Alma mater: University of Colorado

William Carl "Bill" Frey (February 26, 1930 - October 11, 2020) was an American Episcopal bishop. He served as missionary bishop of the Episcopal Church (United States) for the Episcopal Diocese of Guatemala and later as bishop of the Episcopal Diocese of Colorado. He was an Evangelical and was considered a moderate theological conservative. He supported women's ordination but opposed active homosexuality.

== Ecclesiastical career ==
He was ordained to the priesthood in 1956 in the Episcopal Diocese of Colorado. He held a BA in Spanish and a minor in French from the University of Colorado, and a Master of Divinity from the Philadelphia Divinity School.

He became a missionary in Latin America in 1962 and was consecrated as missionary bishop of the Diocese of Guatemala in 1967. In 1971 he and his family were evicted from that country for making public statements about peacemaking during an undeclared civil war. His books The Dance of Hope (2010) and Cancelada: Why They Threw us out of Guatemala (2012), give details about his family's eviction from Guatemala.

In 1972 Frey was elected bishop coadjutor of the Diocese of Colorado and then installed as bishop of the diocese the following year. During that time there was a dispute over the use of the Episcopal Church's revised Book of Common Prayer. Frey seized St. Mark's Church, Denver, by downgrading it from a parish to a mission, citing what he described as an inflammatory article by the church's pastor as proof that the priest intended to secede from the diocese, which the priest denied. This was reported to be apparently the first time an Episcopal parish had been dissolved in the United States in a dispute over forms and rites of worship.

He also had a connection to actress Ann B. Davis from TV's The Brady Bunch. In 1976, Davis sold her home in Los Angeles to move to Denver, Colorado, where she joined the Episcopal communal house of approximately 18 members headed by Frey and his wife, Barbara. Davis was part of that household, which relocated to Pennsylvania and finally Texas, until her death in 2014.

In 1985, he was one of the four candidates to be Presiding Bishop of the Episcopal Church, but lost to more liberal bishop Edmond Browning. In 1991, he proposed that the church's canon law require that all clergy be committed to abstaining from sexual relations outside marriage.

On November 15, 1993 the Colorado Supreme Court affirmed lower court rulings that implicated Bishop Frey's conduct in a case of the sexual exploitation of a parishioner by Father Paul Robinson.

In 1990, after 18 years in Colorado, he resigned as bishop to become the dean of Trinity Episcopal School for Ministry in Ambridge, Pennsylvania. He stepped down as dean in 1996 and moved to the San Antonio region in Texas to retire, but remained active in ministry. After the resignation of Bishop Jeffrey N. Steenson, Frey was asked to be assisting bishop for the Episcopal Diocese of the Rio Grande. During his time as assisting bishop of Rio Grande he debated Presiding Bishop Katharine Jefferts Schori. What was billed as a debate, with Frey representing traditional, orthodox Christianity, took place on December 12 of 2009. Some conservative observers were disappointed by Frey's lack of willingness to press Jefferts Schori on her former statements that called into question basic tenets of Christianity, like Jesus's resurrection from the dead.

He also served as interim rector of Christ Church, San Antonio, Texas. He was a member of Communion Partners, an Episcopalian group which opposed the 77th General Episcopal Convention's decision to authorize the blessing of same-sex marriages in 2012. The measure to allow the blessing of same-sex unions won by a 111–41 vote with 3 abstentions.

Frey's wife, Barbara, died in 2014. They had five adult children, two of whom are priests of the Episcopal Church.

Episcopal Church (USA) titles
Preceded by See created	Missionary Bishop of Guatemala, Honduras, and El Salvador; 1967–1971	Succeeded by Anselmo Carral (Guatemala and Honduras); G. Edward Haynsworth (El Salvador)
Preceded by Edwin B. Thayer	Episcopal Bishop of Colorado; 1973–1990	Succeeded by Jerry Winterrowd
Academic offices
Preceded by John H. Rodgers Jr.	Dean and President, Trinity Episcopal School for Ministry; 1990–1996	Succeeded by Peter C. Moore
