= Irving P. Johnson =

American bishop (1866–1947)

The Right Reverend Irving Peake Johnson D.D., S.T.D., LL.D.
- Bishop of Colorado
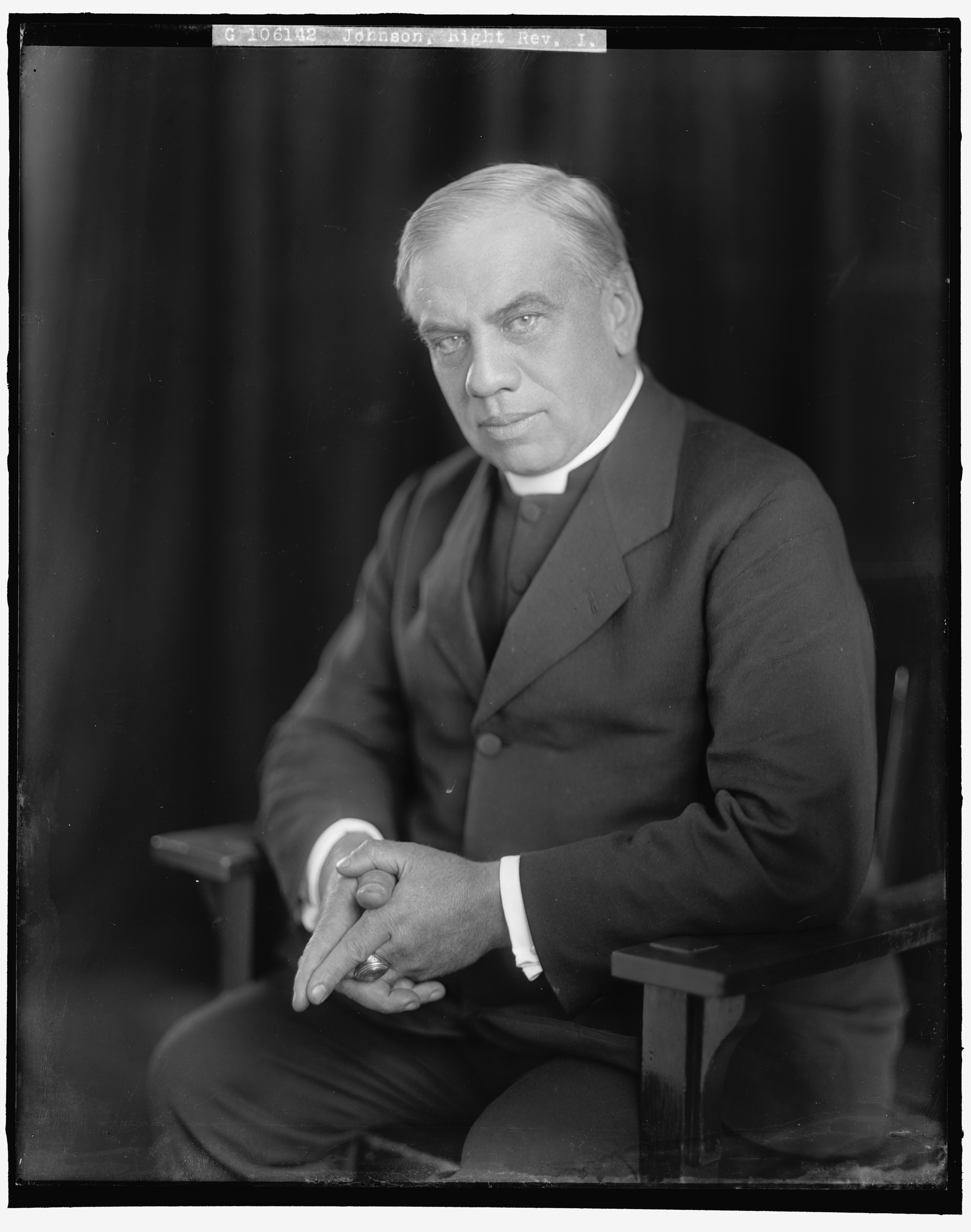
- Irving P. Johnson in 1905
- Church: Episcopal Church
- Diocese: Colorado
- Elected: June 8, 1916
- In office: 1918–1938
- Predecessor: Charles Sanford Olmsted
- Successor: Fred Ingley
- Previous post: Coadjutor Bishop of Colorado (1917-1918)

Orders
- Ordination: October 18, 1891 by George Worthington
- Consecration: January 1, 1917 by Daniel S. Tuttle

Personal details
- Born: November 5, 1866 Hudson, New York, United States
- Died: March 1, 1947 (aged 80) Minneapolis, Minnesota, United States
- Denomination: Anglican
- Parents: William Ross Johnson & Adeline Dickinson
- Spouse: Grace W. Keese (m. 1894)
- Children: 2
- Education: General Theological Seminary
- Alma mater: Union College

Irving Peake Johnson (November 5, 1866 – March 1, 1947) was an American prelate, who served as Bishop of Colorado from 1918 to 1938.

== Early life and education ==
Johnson was born on November 5, 1866, in Hudson, New York, the son of the Rev. William Ross Johnson (1826-1890) and Adeline Dickinson (1829-1890). He was educated at the Union Classical Institute in Schenectady, New York, and later at Union College, from where he graduated with a Bachelor of Arts in 1887, and awarded an honorary Doctor of Divinity in 1912. He then studied at the General Theological Seminary, graduating with a Bachelor of Divinity in 1891. He was awarded a Doctor of Sacred Theology from the University of Denver in 1919, a Doctor of Laws in 1923 from Colorado College, and another honorary Doctor of Divinity in 1927 from the University of Colorado.

== Ordained ministry ==
Johnson was ordained deacon on June 3, 1891, by Bishop John Williams of Connecticut, and priest October 18, 1891, by Bishop George Worthington of Nebraska. He married Grace Woodruf Keese (1866-1947) on June 18, 1894. Between 1891 and 1901, he was a missionary in Omaha, Nebraska, notably rector of St Andrew's Church between 1891 and 1894, and then as rector of St Martin's Church between 1894 and 1901. In 1901, he became rector of Gethsemane Church in Minneapolis, Minnesota, while in 1913, he became Professor of Church History at the Seabury-Western Theological Seminary.

== Episcopacy ==
Johnson was elected Coadjutor Bishop of Colorado on June 8, 1916, during the 30th Annual Council of the Diocese of Colorado, and was consecrated on January 1, 1917, with Presiding Bishop Daniel S. Tuttle as chief consecrator. He succeeded as diocesan bishop upon the death of Bishop Olmsted on October 21, 1918. He retained the post until his retirement in 1938. He died on March 1, 1947, after an illness of several months.
