= John Franklin Spalding =

American bishop (1828–1902)

The Right Reverend John Franklin Spalding D.D.
- Bishop of Colorado
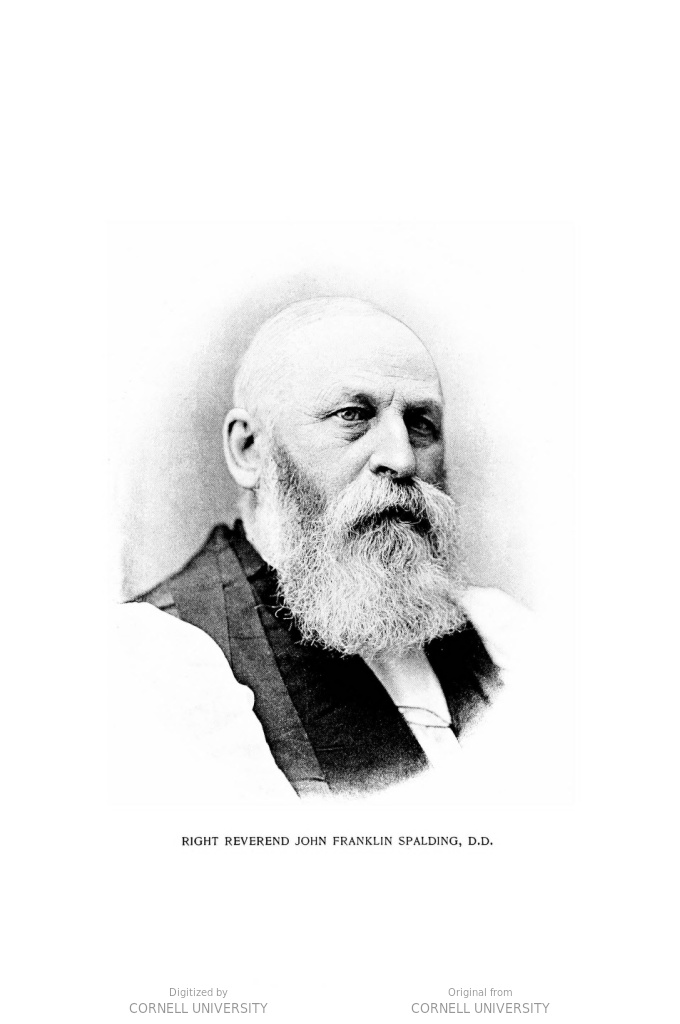
- Church: Episcopal Church
- Diocese: Colorado
- In office: 1873–1902
- Predecessor: George M. Randall
- Successor: Charles Sanford Olmsted

Orders
- Ordination: July 14, 1858 by George Burgess
- Consecration: December 31, 1873 by Samuel A. McCoskry

Personal details
- Born: August 25, 1828 Belgrade, Maine, United States
- Died: March 9, 1902 (aged 73) Erie, Pennsylvania, United States
- Buried: Riverside Cemetery (Denver, Colorado)
- Denomination: Anglican
- Spouse: Lavinia Deborah Spencer
- Children: 5
- Education: Bowdoin College

John Franklin Spalding (August 25, 1828 – March 9, 1902) was a missionary bishop of the Episcopal Church in the United States. He served as Bishop of Colorado, first as missionary and later as diocesan, between 1873 and 1902.

== Early life and education ==
Spalding was born in Belgrade, Maine on August 25, 1828. He attended Bowdoin College in the class of 1853, graduating from General Theological Seminary in the class of 1857. He was awarded a Doctor of Divinity by Trinity College in 1874.

== Priest ==
Spalding was ordained deacon on July 8, 1857, and priest on July 14, 1858, by Bishop George Burgess of Maine. He spent some time as a missionary in Old Town, Maine and in 1859 became rector of St George's Church in Lee, Massachusetts. In 1860 he became assistant minister at Grace Church in Providence, Rhode Island and a year later also served in St John's Church in Providence, Rhode Island. Between 1862 and 1873 he served as rector of St Paul's Church in Erie, Pennsylvania.

== Bishop ==
Spalding was elected Missionary Bishop of Colorado in 1873. He was consecrated on December 31, 1873, by Bishop Samuel A. McCoskry of Michigan together with Bishop Gregory T. Bedell of Ohio, Bishop Joseph C. Talbot of Indiana, Bishop Arthur Cleveland Coxe of Western New York and Bishop John Barrett Kerfoot of Pittsburgh. He was also given responsibility of the missionary districts of Wyoming and New Mexico. Between 1876 and 1880 he was also responsible for Arizona. Colorado was organized as a diocese and Spalding became its first diocesan bishop in 1887. He died on March 9, 1902, at the home of his son in Erie, Pennsylvania.

== Works ==
Spalding wrote a number of books including A Devotional Manual, Jesus Christ, Proof of Christianity, several tracts and numerous occasional sermons and addresses. He also published The Church and its Apostolic Ministry, a course of lectures delivered in St Mark's Church in Denver, Colorado in January 1887.

== Family ==
Spalding married Lavinia Deborah Spencer and together had three sons, including Franklin Spencer Spalding Bishop of Utah, and two daughters.

== See also ==
- Franklin Spencer Spalding
