= Charles Sanford Olmsted =

American bishop (1853–1918)

The Right Reverend Charles Sanford Olmsted D.D.
- Bishop of Colorado
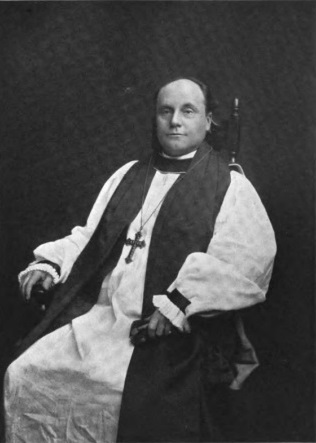
- Church: Episcopal Church
- Diocese: Colorado
- Elected: January 8, 1902
- In office: 1902–1918
- Predecessor: John Franklin Spalding
- Successor: Irving P. Johnson

Orders
- Ordination: June 11, 1877 by William Croswell Doane
- Consecration: May 1, 1902 by Daniel S. Tuttle

Personal details
- Born: February 8, 1853 Minerva, New York, United States
- Died: October 21, 1918 (aged 65) Old Saybrook, Connecticut, United States
- Buried: Old Saybrook, Connecticut
- Denomination: Anglican
- Parents: Levi Olmsted & Maria Beach
- Spouse: Mary Melva Deuel (m. 1877)
- Children: 5
- Education: St. Stephen's College

Charles Sanford Olmsted (February 8, 1853 – October 21, 1918) was a bishop of the Episcopal Diocese of Colorado from 1902 to 1918. He was the first bishop elected by the Diocese of Colorado after it became an independent diocese.

== Olmstead or Olmsted? ==
The surname has been spelled “both as ‘Olmsted’ and ‘Olmstead.’” The Genealogy of the Olmsted Family in America, which includes information about the subject of this article, recognizes that some members of the family prefer “Olmstead” over “Olmsted.” However, the author of the book chose to use “Olmsted.”

To add to the confusion about spelling, a 1918 newspaper story about the death of the “Colorado Prelate” spelled his name as Olmstead in the headline and as Olmsted in the story.

In spite of the confusion, this article uses the “Olmsted” because of the reasons that include the following:

- According to a 1902 newspaper about his accepting his election as “bishop coadjutor of the Colorado diocese,” he signed his letter using the “Olmsted” spelling.
- When the Standing Committee of the Episcopal Diocese of Albany recorded their giving consent to the election of “the Bishop Coadjutor of Colorado” they spelled his name “Olmsted.”
- When the Standing Committee of the Episcopal Diocese of Massachusetts recorded their giving consent to the election of “the Bishop Coadjutor of Colorado” they spelled his name “Olmsted.”
- In the listing of the House of Bishops for 1916, the “Olmsted” spelling is used.

== Early life ==
Charles Sanford Olmsted was born on February 8, 1853, in Olmstedville, New York, a hamlet in the town of Minerva, Essex County, N.Y., where his parents then resided. His parents were Levi and Maria "Beach" Olmsted. He was a grandson of Zahnon and Rebecca "Barlow" Olmsted, and a great-grandson of Lemuel and Silence "Weed" Olmsted. He was a descendant of Richard Olmsted, first of Hartford, and afterward of Norwalk, Connecticut.

== Education ==
In 1873, Olmstead graduated from St. Stephen's College (now Bard's College) in Annandale, New York. He studied theology at the General Theological Seminary in New York City, graduating in 1875. `

== Ministry as a priest ==
Olmsted was ordained as a deacon in the Protestant Episcopal Church in 1876 by Bishop Horatio Potter. He was ordained as a priest by Bishop William Croswell Doane in 1877.

As a priest, Olmsted served in three Parishes: eight years in Morley, N.Y., twelve years in Cooperstown, N.Y., and six years in Bala, Pa. An article in St, Andrew’s Magazine summed up his ministry in three words: “Study, Administration, and Preaching.”

Served in Morley, N.Y.
From 1876 to 1884, Olmsted was the rector of Trinity Episcopal Chapel (Morley, New York), St. Lawrence County, N.Y.” Morley was “a village of fewer than four hundred people.” Olmstead did much missionary work in the village and in the surrounding rural area. At the same time, he found time for reading in the fields of Theology, History, Literature and Philosophy.

On May 24, 1877, Olmsted married Mary Melva Deuel. They had the following children:

- James Frederick Rogers, born June 24, 1878.
- William Arthur, born August 13, 1879.
- Charles Maurice DeVere, born May 29, 1884.
- Ruth, born March 27, 1887.
- Richard, born March 19, 1892.

Served in Cooperstown, N.Y.
From 1884 to 1896, Olmsted served as rector of [http://www.christchurchcooperstown.org/index.html Christ Episcopal Church in Cooperstown, N. Y. Cooperstown was a “charming village,” which lay in “the center of a vast missionary field.” Olmsted was “known as an able Parish Priest.” He traveled the area, “preaching in school houses and founding Sunday schools.”

Regarding the parish's buildings, he increased the size of the Church and built an Elizabethan Rectory.

During ten years of his rectorship he was one of the archdeacons of the Diocese of Albany.

Also, during time in Cooperstown, Olmsted served as secretary of the board of trustees of the Orphan House of the Holy Saviour.

Served in Bala, Pa.
In 1896, Olmsted became the Rector of St. Asaph’s Episcopal Church, Bala. Bala was a suburb of Philadelphia, Pa. Because the parish was made up of “a few rich families,” it had few activities and no Sunday evening service. This left Olmsted time for extra-parochial activities. He adopted the nearby Union Sunday School, made it a part of St. Asaph's, and left it with two hundred and fifty scholars. Because there was no Sunday evening service, Olmsted preached almost every Sunday evening in the Philadelphia area, thereby, earning “the foremost place among the preachers” in Pennsylvania.

In 1901, Olmsted was a Deputy from the Diocese of Pennsylvania to the Episcopal Church's General Convention.

While at St. Asaph's, Olmsted was elected bishop coadjutor of the Diocese of Colorado.

== Ministry as bishop: 1902–1918 ==
John Franklin Spalding, the diocesan bishop of Colorado, called for the Special Council because he said that his health made it impossible to perform his duties “acceptably.” Therefore, “to seek relief,” he asked for a bishop coadjutor. On January 8, 1902, the election was held at a Special Council of the diocese convened at the “Cathedral Church of St. John the Divine” in Denver. Olmsted was elected on the twenty-sixth ballot. Afterward, a motion to make the election unanimous was passed.

After Olmstead's election, he wrote the Diocese of Colorado a letter of acceptance. The letter was prefaced with “in the fear of God and with deep love for his faithful in the diocese of Colorado” and concluded with “may the great head of the church sustain me in this trust and grant me a merciful judgment at the latter day.”

Before Olmsted could be consecrated, Bishop Spalding died on March 8, 1902, leaving the diocese with only a “diocesan designate” until Olmsted was consecrated on May 1, 1902.

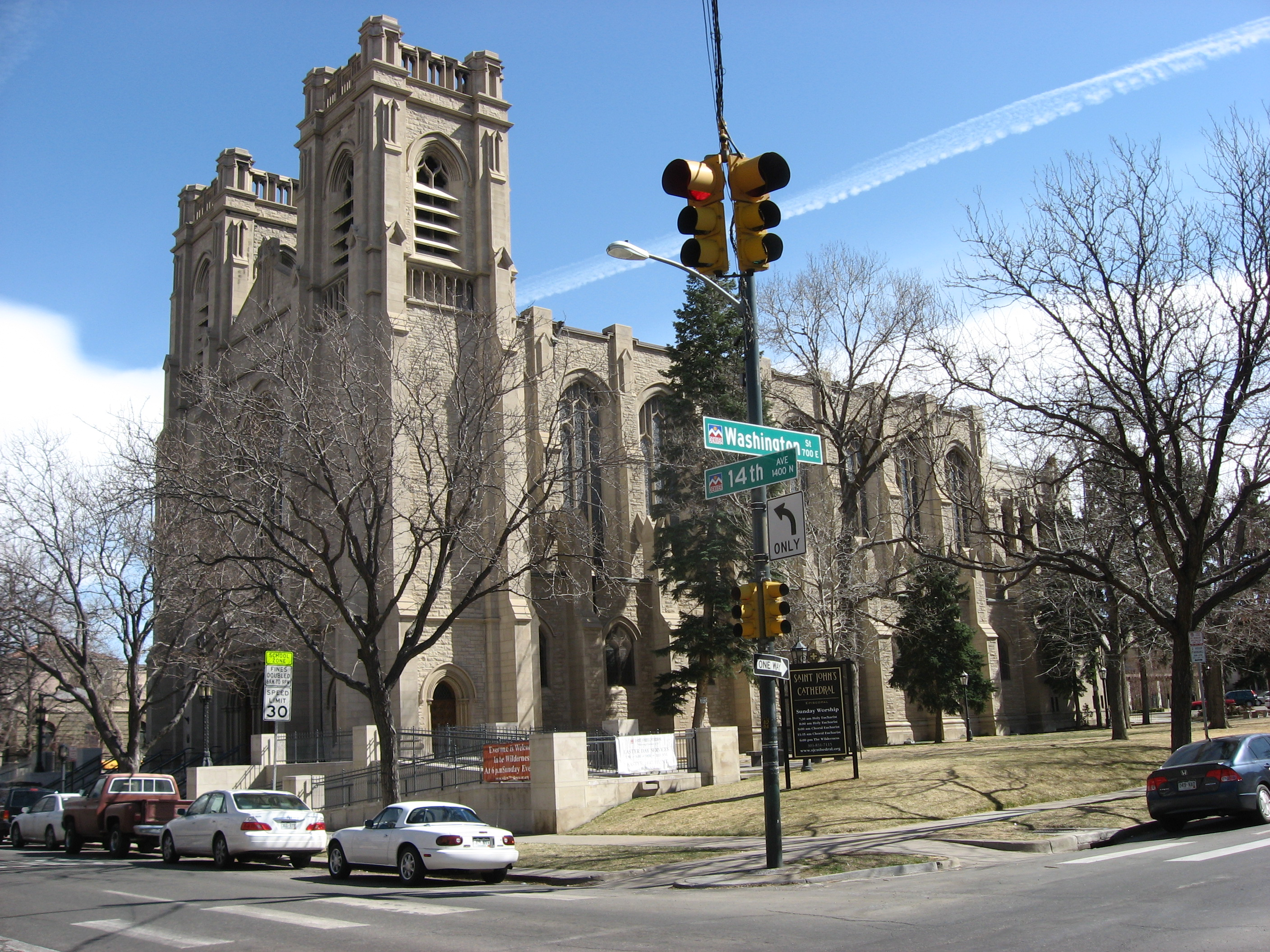
Cathedral of St. John in the Wilderness

On May 1, 1902, Olmsted was consecrated the first bishop elected by the Diocese of Colorado. The service was held in the Cathedral of St. John in the Wilderness in Denver, Colorado. The chief consecrator was Bishop Daniel S. Tuttle of Missouri, who was also the Presiding Bishop of the Episcopal Church. Sixteen bishops and more than one hundred priests were present with a congregation which filled the church. Bishop Leighton Coleman of Delaware preached.

== First, second, third or fourth bishop? ==
Olmsted has been called the first, second, third, and fourth bishop of Colorado.

1. Olmsted has sometimes been called “the first bishop of the Diocese of Colorado.” He can properly be called the “first” bishop from this perspective. He was the first bishop elected after the Missionary District of Colorado became the independent Diocese of Colorado in 1887. Bishops with jurisdiction over Colorado previous to Olmsted had been Missionary Bishops elected by the House of Bishops of the Episcopal Church.

2. Olmsted has sometimes been called the “second bishop of Colorado.” He can properly be called the “second” bishop from this perspective. In 1887, when the Missionary District of Colorado became the independent Diocese of Colorado, the previous Missionary Bishop Franklin Spencer Spalding continued as the bishop of the new diocese. Olmsted was elected by the independent Diocese as Bishop Coadjutor in 1902.

3. Olmsted has sometimes been called the “third bishop of Colorado.”

4. Olmsted is also listed as the fourth bishop of Colorado. Beginning in 1860, three Missionary Bishops had jurisdiction over Colorado: Joseph Cruikshank Talbot (1860–1865), George M. Randall (1865–1873), and John Franklin Spalding (1878–1902). Olmsted was elected by the independent Diocese as Bishop Coadjutor in 1902.

Activities as bishop
In 1903, a newspaper story about Olmstead's preaching characterized him as “one of the foremost preacher’s in the Episcopal Church.”

On January 28, 1903, after attending the fifth annual convocation of the missionary district of Colorado, Bishop Olmsted addressed the students at Utah State University. His topic was “True Culture.” In substance, Olmstead said that the man of true culture was one “who knows the human heart best.”

In 1906, “a graceful story” about Olmstead was told in a Denver church. When Olmsted moved to Denver, he was regularly seen “in the poorest and most squalid” of Denver's slums. At first, when loafers outside the saloons saw him in his clerical garb, they asked, “what’s that?” The answer would be “that’s what you call a bishop.” After a year, when someone asked the same question, the loafers answered, “the bishop.” After another year, when the same question was asked, the loafers replied, “what, that’s our bishop.”

On February 19, 1909, Olmsted spoke to the annual meeting of the Nebraska Church Club. He said that “we can make America good and great with the Bible and the prayer book.”

In 1910, Olmsted was listed in The Living Church Annual and Whittaker's Churchman's Almanac as a vice-president of the American Church Union. The stated purpose of the organization was “the maintenance and defense of the Doctrine, Discipline, and Worship of the Church.

== Halifax commemoration ==
Beginning on September 3, 1910, the Church of England in Canada held a Commemoration of the Bicentennial of the founding of the Church of England in Halifax, N.S. and the opening of All Saints Cathedral, Halifax. The new building replaced one which had been destroyed by fire. In connection with the Commemoration, many bishops came, some from other nations, to preach in the parishes and to lecture. Olmsted preached at St. Mark’s Church, Halifax and lectured on the topic of “The Child and the State.”

The Official Report contains a summary of Olmsted's address. He said, among other things, the following:

- “If the State is to govern, it should do its duty toward the Church, the family and the individual.”
- He believed “it to be in the interests of the State to have the Church closely allied to it.”
- “The State should encourage farming and the staple industries.”
- “The drift to the cities should be stopped and the country should be developed.”

== Dean Hart’s criticism ==
Henry Martyn Hart was a controversial dean of the Cathedral of St. John in the Wilderness in Denver, Colorado. His tenure overlapped Olmsted's episcopate. In 1917, Hart published his Recollections and Reflections. In the book, he wrote about Olmsted. He said that although Olmsted “must have been endued with all that was requisite for The Office of a Bishop, but he was incompetent “to manage the most ordinary financial processes.” This incompetence allowed the St. John's Cathedral's Chapter Clerk to embezzle Diocesan Funds.

== Honorary degrees ==
Olmsted was awarded the following honorary degrees:

- A Doctor of Sacred Theology from Hobart College in 1895.
- A Doctor of Divinity from the General Theological Seminary in 1902.

== Death ==
In 1913, Olmsted, “on account of illness,” had to cancel a visitation to one of the churches in his diocese. Beginning on January 1, 1917, Olmsted became unable to handle the affairs of the diocese. The bishop coadjutor, Irving P. Johnson, had been doing so. On May 11, 1918, the Rochester, NY newspaper the Democrat and Chronicle announced that “Bishop Olmsted of Colorado has been taken ill.” His illness was the result of heart disease.

Olmsted died on October 21, 1918, and was buried in Old Saybrook, Connecticut. The funeral service was held in Grace Episcopal Church, where Omsted had once been the minister. Olmsted's was survived by his wife.

== Works ==
- Charles Sanford Olmsted, “Lecture on The Two Creeds” in Christian Unity and the Bishops' Declaration Lectures (E. & J. B. Young & Co., 1895), 81-118.
- Charles Sanford Olmsted, December Musings and Other Poems (George W. Jacobs, 1898).
- Lines Read at Glacier (Laggan, B.C., 1901)
- In Memoriam: the Right Reverend William David Walker, Bishop of the Diocese of Western New York (Buffalo, NY: Trinity Church, 1917)
- The Discipline of Perfection; Ordination Sermon (1902).
- Essays on Mediaeval Poets (1904).
