= Harold L. Bowen =

American Episcopal bishop

The Right Reverend Harold Linwood Bowen D.D.
- Bishop of Colorado
- Church: Episcopal Church
- Diocese: Colorado
- Elected: May 19, 1947
- In office: 1949–1955
- Predecessor: Fred Ingley
- Successor: Joseph Minnis
- Previous post: Coadjutor Bishop of Colorado (1947-1949)

Orders
- Ordination: June 4, 1911 by Francis Key Brooke
- Consecration: September 29, 1947 by Henry Knox Sherrill

Personal details
- Born: April 27, 1886 Dighton, Massachusetts, United States
- Died: September 11, 1967 (aged 81) San Diego, California, United States
- Denomination: Anglican
- Parents: David Irving Bowen & Rebecca Talbot Briggs
- Spouse: Elizabeth Sherrill Cockle (m. 1916)
- Children: 3
- Education: University of Oklahoma

Harold Linwood Bowen (April 27, 1886—September 11, 1967) was bishop of the Episcopal Diocese of Colorado, serving from 1949 to 1955.

== Early life and education ==
Bowen was born on April 27, 1886, in Dighton, Massachusetts, the son of David Irving Bowen and Rebecca Talbot Briggs. He was educated at the High School in Bedford, Massachusetts, before attending St Stephen's College, and then the University of Oklahoma, graduating with a Bachelor of Arts in 1909. He also studied at Seabury-Western Theological Seminary, earning a Bachelor of Divinity in 1918, and he was awarded an honorary Doctor of Divinity in 1934.

== Ordained ministry ==
Bowen was made deacon in May 1910 and ordained priest on June 4, 1911, by Bishop Francis Key Brooke of Oklahoma. He married Elizabeth Sherrill Cockle (1893-1959) on September 5, 1916, and together they had three children. Between 1914 and 1921, he served as priest at St Paul's Cathedral in Oklahoma City, St Luke's Church in Chickasha, Oklahoma, St Mary's Church in Omaha, Nebraska, and St Paul's Church in Peoria, Illinois. In 1921, he became rector of St Peter's Church in Chicago, then in 1930, he became rector of St Mark's Church in Evanston, Illinois, where he remained till 1947.

== Bishop ==
On May 19, 1947, Bowen was elected Coadjutor Bishop of Colorado on the fourth ballot, during a diocesan convention held in St John's Cathedral. He was then consecrated on September 29, 1947, with Presiding Bishop Henry Knox Sherrill as principal consecrator. He succeeded as diocesan bishop in 1949. During his episcopate, he worked to extend the missionary program of the diocese. He retired in 1955. Bowen died on September 11, 1967, in his home in San Diego, California, after a brief illness.
