= Joseph Minnis =

American bishop

The Right Reverend Joseph Summerville Minnis D.D.
- Bishop of Colorado
- Church: Episcopal Church
- Diocese: Colorado
- Elected: May 19, 1954
- In office: 1955–1969
- Predecessor: Harold L. Bowen
- Successor: Edwin B. Thayer
- Previous post: Coadjutor Bishop of Colorado (1954-1955)

Orders
- Ordination: June 1929 by Benjamin F. P. Ivins
- Consecration: September 29, 1954 by Stephen F. Bayne Jr.

Personal details
- Born: January 3, 1904 Terre Haute, Indiana, United States
- Died: September 6, 1977 (aged 73) San Francisco, California, United States
- Denomination: Anglican
- Parents: Joseph William Minnis & Sarah Summerville
- Spouse: Mary Katherine Abell (m. 1933)
- Children: 4

Joseph Summerville Minnis (January 3, 1904 - September 6, 1977) was the sixth bishop of Colorado in The Episcopal Church, serving from 1954 until his removal from office in 1969 after a closed-door church trial.

== Early life and education ==
Minnis was born on January 3, 1904, in Terre Haute, Indiana, the son of Joseph William Minnis and Sarah Summerville. He was educated at the Bloom High School, and then at Nashotah House from where he graduated in 1929 with a Bachelor of Divinity, and awarded a Doctor of Divinity in 1947.

== Ordained ministry ==
Minnis was ordained deacon in Dec 1928, and priest in June 1929, by Bishop Benjamin F. P. Ivins of Milwaukee. He married Mary Katherine Abell on June 5, 1933, and together had four children. He served on the Staff City Mission in Chicago between 1927 and 1928. After ordination, he served in St Mark's Church in Beaver Dam, Wisconsin, while a short time later, in 1929, he became assistant priest at the Church of the Atonement in Chicago. In 1931 he was appointed a Long-term fellow at the College of Preachers of the Washington National Cathedral, while in 1932, he became chaplain of the State Penitentiary, and rector of Christ Church in Joliet, Illinois. In 1943, he was appointed vicar of the Church of the Intercession in New York City, where he remained till 1954.

== Bishop ==
On May 19, 1954, Minnis was elected Coadjutor Bishop of Colorado on the first ballot, during a diocesan convention. He was consecrated on September 29, 1954, by Bishop Stephen F. Bayne Jr. of Olympia. He then succeeded as diocesan on February 1, 1955.

== Removal from Office ==
Minnis was charged and deposed for breaking his ordination vows in 1968, in front of a board made up of nine members, and chaired by Bishop John Seville Higgins of Rhode Island. The specific details of the accusations were not made public. He was forced to resign, becoming effective on January 3, 1969, and was banished from the diocese.
