= Edwin B. Thayer =

Bishop of the Episcopal Diocese of Colorado

The Right Reverend Edwin Burton Thayer D.D.
- Bishop of Colorado
- Church: Episcopal Church
- Diocese: Colorado
- Elected: May 1969
- In office: 1969–1973
- Predecessor: Joseph Minnis
- Successor: William Frey
- Previous post: Suffragan Bishop of Colorado (1960-1969)

Orders
- Ordination: September 21, 1934 by George Craig Stewart
- Consecration: November 30, 1960 by Joseph Minnis

Personal details
- Born: February 7, 1905 Avalon, Pennsylvania, United States
- Died: October 8, 1989 (aged 84) Denver, Colorado, United States
- Buried: Fairmount Cemetery
- Denomination: Anglican
- Parents: Richard Shattuck Thayer & Elizabeth Robinson
- Spouse: Evelyn Marie Hansen (m. 1935)
- Children: 3
- Education: Seabury-Western Theological Seminary
- Alma mater: University of Illinois

Edwin Burton Thayer (February 7, 1905 – October 8, 1989) was bishop of the Episcopal Diocese of Colorado from 1969 to 1973.

== Early life and education ==
Thayer was born on February 7, 1905, in Avalon, Pennsylvania, the son of Richard Shattuck Thayer and Elizabeth Robinson. He was educated at the Morton High School, and then studied at the University of Illinois with a Bachelor of Science in 1928. He also studied at the Seabury-Western Theological Seminary, graduating with a Bachelor of Divinity in 1934. He married Evelyn Marie Hansen on June 10, 1935, and together had three children.

== Ordained ministry ==
Thayer was ordained deacon on February 12, 1934, and priest on September 21, 1934, both by Bishop George Craig Stewart of Chicago. He initially served as vicar of St Mary's Church in Crystal Lake, Illinois and St Anne's Church in Woodstock, Illinois between 1934 and 1936. In 1936, he took upon himself the responsibility as vicar of St Anne's Church in Morrison, Illinois, while in 1938, he became rector of Christ Church in Burlington, Iowa. In 1941, he enrolled as a chaplain in the U.S. Army, serving till the end of WWII in 1945. After the war, he was appointed rector of St Luke's Church in Fort Collins, Colorado, where he served till 1950. Between 1950 and 1960, he served as rector of the Church of the Ascension in Denver, Colorado.

== Bishop ==
Thayer was elected Suffragan Bishop of Colorado on the fourth ballot, on September 8, 1960, during a special convention held in Denver. He was then consecrated on November 30, 1960, in St John's Cathedral, by the Bishop of Colorado Joseph Minnis. Thayer was then elected to be diocesan bishop of Colorado at the 83rd annual diocesan convention in May 1969. He retired in 1973.
