= Robert John O'Neill (bishop) =

American bishop

The Right Reverend Robert John O'Neill
- Bishop of Colorado
- Church: Episcopal Church
- Diocese: Colorado
- Elected: June 21, 2003
- In office: 2004–2019
- Predecessor: Jerry Winterrowd
- Successor: Kimberly Lucas
- Previous post: Coadjutor Bishop of Colorado (2003-2004)

Orders
- Ordination: 1982
- Consecration: October 4, 2003 by James L. Jelinek

Personal details
- Denomination: Anglican
- Spouse: Ginger

Robert John O'Neill is an American prelate of the Episcopal Church, who served as the tenth Bishop of Colorado between 2004 and 2019.

== Biography ==
O'Neill was ordained priest in 1982 after seminary studies at the Berkeley Divinity School at Yale. O'Neill served in Colorado as Canon Educator at St. John's Cathedral in Denver, and prior to his election as Coadjutor Bishop of Colorado on June 21, 2003, served as rector of Epiphany Church in Winchester, Massachusetts. He was consecrated bishop on October 4, 2003, by the Bishop of Minnesota James L. Jelinek, in the Cherry Hills Community Church in Highlands Ranch, Colorado. He succeeded as diocesan bishop in 2004, and retired in 2019.
