= Franklin Spencer Spalding =

The Right Reverend Franklin Spencer Spalding
- Bishop of Utah
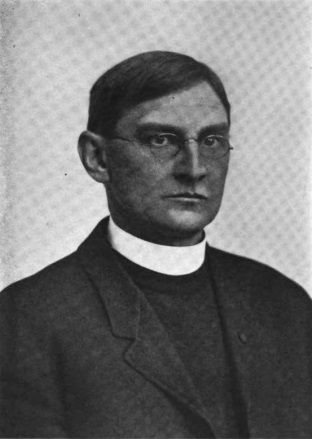
- Spalding in 1904
- Church: Episcopal Church (United States)
- Diocese: Utah
- Appointed: 1904
- Predecessor: Abiel Leonard
- Successor: Paul Jones

Orders
- Ordination: 3 June 1891 (deacon); 1 June 1892 (priest)
- Consecration: 14 December 1904 by Daniel S. Tuttle

Personal details
- Born: March 13, 1865 Erie, Pennsylvania, United States
- Died: September 25, 1914 (aged 49) Salt Lake City Utah, United States
- Buried: Riverside Cemetery
- Denomination: Anglican
- Parents: John Franklin Spalding & Lavinia Deborah Spencer
- Education: College of New Jersey; General Theological Seminary

Franklin Spencer Spalding (1865–1914) was an Episcopal Bishop of Utah from 1905 to 1914 who championed Christian socialism as teachings of the Bible and Jesus Christ. He argued that Christian values and socialist principles were the same, and advocated for peace, health and education reform, and prohibition.

== Early life ==
Franklin Spencer Spalding was born in Erie, Pennsylvania, on March 13, 1865, to John Franklin Spalding, who was serving as rector of St. Paul's Episcopal Church. His father's career would include bishoprics throughout the Mountain West, in the states of New Mexico, Colorado, and New Mexico.

Spalding graduated from College of New Jersey in 1887 and the General Theological Seminary in New York City in 1890. Despite limited experience in the urban churches of New York City where poverty prevailed, Spalding did not encounter activists working for labor related social change until 1896 when he began working as rector of St. Paul's Church in Erie. It took time, working in concert with the Erie Socialist local to help improve his parishioners lives, but eventually Spalding's views on the role of the church in relation to the working class and poor changed. Where he previously believed that the church could work at "persuading the rich and the mighty to be kind and generous and public spirited", he now believed that the only path to truly improve the lives of workers was to fundamentally redesign capitalism itself.

== Political activism ==
Becoming the bishop of the Episcopal Church of Utah in 1905 allowed Spalding a greater reach to spread his message as the job required him to travel through Utah and the country. During his travels, he advocated for socialist principles along with Christian values, in fact arguing that the two were one and the same, stating "Christianity would get along better under socialism than under this individualistic form of government." Like many American Christian socialists and progressive Christians, Spalding's socialism was part of a larger set of societal concerns that broadly constituted the Social Gospel. Along with fighting against the gap between the wealthy and the worker, Spalding was a proponent of peace, health and education reform, and prohibition. While a committed Christian socialist, Spalding never joined the Socialist Party.

While Spalding criticized what he saw as failings of the church in relation to the working class, he was sensitive to any division that his opinions may have caused among his brethren. However, he refused to alter or to cease speaking out for what he thought was right. He strongly contended that capital and the wealthy were too much in control of American churches and worship, to the detriment of the worker.

In the November 1914 issue of The Christian Socialist, Spalding stated:

The Christian Church exists for the sole purpose of saving the human race. So far she has failed, but I think that Socialism shows her how she may succeed. It insists that men cannot be made right until the material conditions be made right. Although man cannot live by bread alone, he must have bread. Therefore the Church must destroy a system of society which inevitably creates and perpetuates unequal and unfair conditions of life. These unequal and unfair conditions have been created by competition. Therefore competition must cease and cooperation take its place.

Notably, on August 11, 1898, Spalding was the lead climber in a party of four to first summit Grand Teton, the tallest mountain in the Teton Range in Grand Teton National Park. However, Spalding actually believed that an earlier attempt in 1872 was the first successful ascent of the peak. On September 25, 1914, he was struck and killed by an automobile while walking to a mailbox near his Salt Lake City home.
