= The Episcopal Church in Colorado =

Episcopal Church diocese in Colorado

Diocese of Colorado Diœcesis Coloratensis

Location
- Country: United States
- Territory: Colorado
- Ecclesiastical province: Province VI
- Subdivisions: 5
- Coordinates: 39°44′16″N 104°58′39″W

Statistics
- Congregations: 90 (2025)
- Members: 19,259 (2025)

Information
- Denomination: The Episcopal Church
- Established: June 9, 1887
- Cathedral: St John's Cathedral

Current leadership
- Bishop: Kimberly Lucas

Map
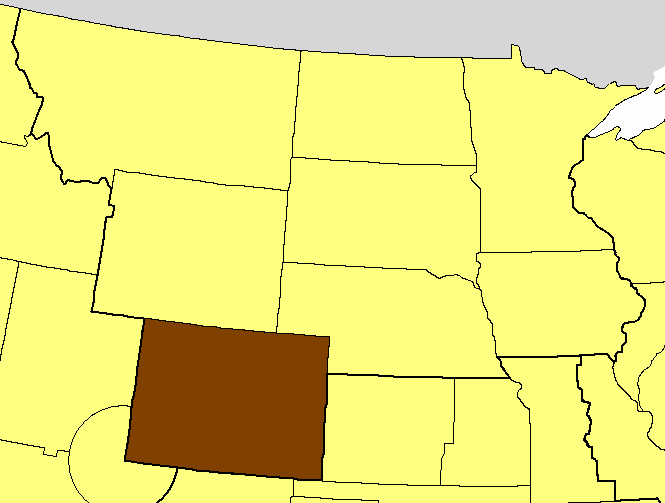
- Location of The Episcopal Church in Colorado

Website
- www.coloradodiocese.org

The Diocese of Colorado is the diocese of the Episcopal Church which covers all of Colorado. It is in Province VI. Its cathedral, Saint John's Cathedral, Denver, is located in Denver, along with its offices. John Franklin Spalding was the first bishop of the diocese. Kimberly "Kym" Lucas is the current bishop.

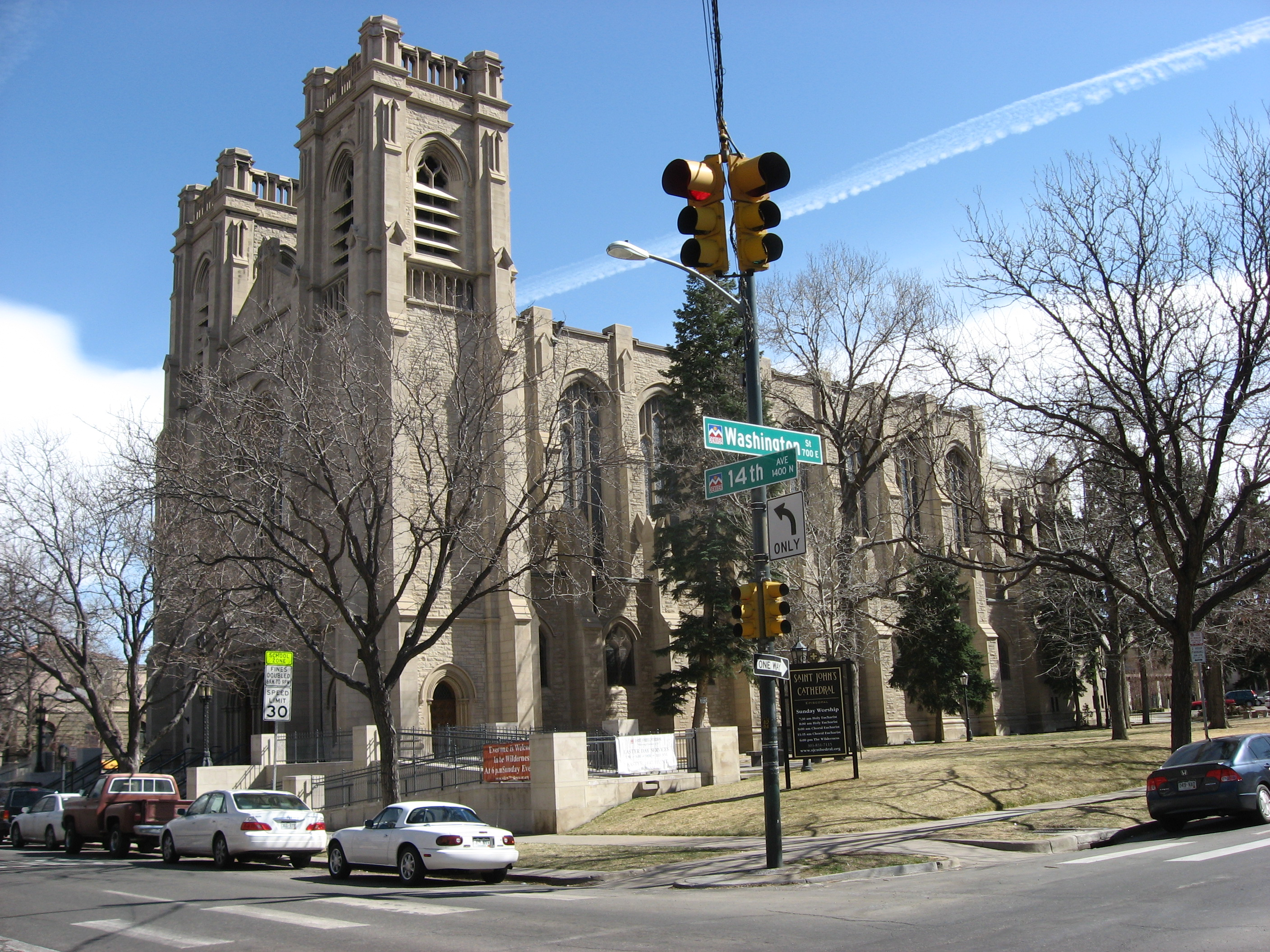
Saint John's Cathedral

In 2025, the diocese reported average Sunday attendance (ASA) of 6,921 persons, a decrease from 9,374 in 2015. Plate and pledge income for the 90 filing congregations of the diocese in 2025 was $26,308,160. Between 2015 and 2025, reported membership declined from 25,266 to 19,259.

== History ==
Colorado was part of the Missionary District of the Northwest from 1859 until 1865, when the Missionary District of Colorado and Parts Adjacent was established. On October 4, 1866, the House of Bishops changed the Missionary District of Colorado and Parts Adjacent to include Colorado, New Mexico, and Wyoming, while Montana and Idaho were detached from Colorado. On October 30, 1874, the district was once more changed, this time as the Missionary District of Colorado with jurisdiction in Wyoming, while New Mexico was detached from Colorado. It was on October 15, 1883, that the Missionary District of Colorado was established, after which Wyoming was made a created into a separate missionary district. The Missionary District became the Diocese of Colorado on June 9, 1887.

== Congregations by region ==
The Episcopal Church in Colorado is divided into five regions – the Northwestern, Southwestern, Sangre de Cristo, High Plains, and Front Range:

=== Front Range ===
- All Saints' Episcopal Church, Loveland, Colorado
- Calvary Episcopal Church, Golden, Colorado
- Church of the Holy Comforter, Broomfield, Colorado
- Church of the Transfiguration, Evergreen, Colorado
- Grace Episcopal Church, Georgetown, Colorado
- Our Merciful Savior Episcopal Church, Denver, Colorado
- Parish Church of St. Bartholomew the Apostle, Estes Park, Colorado
- St. Aidan's Episcopal Church, Boulder, Colorado
- St. Alban's Episcopal Church, Windsor, Colorado
- St. Ambrose Episcopal Church, Boulder, Colorado
- St. Brigit Episcopal Church, Frederick, Colorado
- St. James Episcopal Church, Wheat Ridge, Colorado
- St. John Chrysostom Episcopal Church, Golden, Colorado
- St. John's Episcopal Church, Boulder, Colorado
- St. Joseph Episcopal Church, Lakewood, Colorado
- St. Laurence's Episcopal Church, Conifer, Colorado
- St. Luke Episcopal Church, Fort Collins, Colorado
- St. Martha's Episcopal Church, Westminster, Colorado
- St. Mary Magdalene Episcopal Church, Boulder, Colorado
- St. Paul Episcopal Church, Central City, Colorado
- St. Paul's Episcopal Church, Fort Collins, Colorado
- St. Paul's Episcopal Church, Lakewood, Colorado
- St. Philip & St. James Episcopal Church, Denver, Colorado
- St. Stephen's Episcopal Church, Longmont, Colorado
- The Church of Christ the King, Arvada, Colorado
- The Episcopal Parish of St. Gregory, Littleton, Colorado
- Trinity Episcopal Church, Greeley, Colorado

=== High Plains ===
- Christ Episcopal Church, Denver, Colorado
- Christ's Episcopal Church, Castle Rock, Colorado
- Church of the Ascension, Denver, Colorado
- Epiphany Episcopal Church, Denver, Colorado
- Good Shepherd Episcopal Church, Centennial, Colorado
- Intercession Episcopal Church, Thornton, Colorado
- Peace in Christ ELM, Elizabeth, Colorado
- Prince of Peace Episcopal Church, Sterling, Colorado
- St. Andrew's Episcopal Church, Denver, Colorado
- St. Andrew's Episcopal Church, Fort Lupton, Colorado
- St. Barnabas Episcopal Church, Denver, Colorado
- St. Bede Episcopal Chapel, Denver, Colorado
- St. Charles the Martyr Episcopal Church, Ft. Morgan, Colorado
- St. Elizabeth's Episcopal Church, Brighton, Colorado
- St. Francis Episcopal Chapel, Denver, Colorado
- St. Gabriel the Archangel Episcopal Church, Cherry Hills Village, Colorado
- St. John's Cathedral, Denver, Colorado
- St. Luke's Episcopal Church, Denver, Colorado
- St. Martin-in-the-Fields Episcopal Church, Aurora, Colorado
- St. Matthew's Episcopal Church, Parker, Colorado
- St. Michael & All Angels Episcopal Church, Denver, Colorado
- St. Philip-in-the-Field Episcopal Church, Sedalia, Colorado
- St. Stephen's Episcopal Church, Aurora, Colorado
- St. Thomas Episcopal Church, Denver, Colorado
- St. Timothy's Episcopal Church, Centennial, Colorado
- Sudanese Community Church, Denver, Colorado
- The Church of the Holy Redeemer, Denver, Colorado
- The Episcopal Church of St. Peter and St. Mary, Denver, Colorado

=== Northwestern ===
- All Saints Episcopal Church, Battlement Mesa, Colorado
- Christ Episcopal Church, Aspen, Colorado
- Cranmer Memorial Chapel, Winter Park, Colorado
- Episcopal Church of the Transfiguration, Vail, Colorado
- Grace Episcopal Church, Buena Vista, Colorado
- St. Barnabas Episcopal Church, Glenwood Springs, Colorado
- St. George Episcopal Church, Leadville, Colorado
- St. James' Episcopal Church, Meeker, Colorado
- St. John Episcopal Church, New Castle, Colorado
- St. John the Baptist Episcopal Church, Breckenridge, Colorado
- St. John the Baptist Episcopal Church, Granby, Colorado
- St. Mark's Episcopal Church, Craig, Colorado
- St. Paul Episcopal Church, Steamboat Springs, Colorado
- St. Peter Episcopal Church, Basalt, Colorado
- St. Timothy's Episcopal Church, Rangely, Colorado
- Trinity Episcopal Church, Kremmling, Colorado

=== Sangre de Cristo ===
- Chapel of Our Saviour, Colorado Springs, Colorado
- Chapel of the Resurrection, Limon, Colorado
- Christ Episcopal Church, Canon City, Colorado
- Church of St. Michael the Archangel, Colorado Springs, Colorado
- Church of the Ascension & Holy Trinity, Pueblo, Colorado
- Church of the Ascension, Salida, Colorado
  - Little Shepard of the Hills Mission, Crestone, Colorado
- Church of the Good Shepherd, Colorado Springs, Colorado
- Grace and St. Stephen's Episcopal Church, Colorado Springs, Colorado
- St. Andrew Episcopal Church, La Junta, Colorado
- St. Andrew's Episcopal Church, Cripple Creek, Colorado
- St. Andrew's Episcopal Church, Manitou Springs, Colorado
- St. Benedict Episcopal Church, La Veta, Colorado
- St. David of the Hills Episcopal Church, Woodland Park, Colorado
- St. Luke's Episcopal Mission, Westcliffe, Colorado
- St. Matthias Episcopal Church, Monument, Colorado
- St. Paul's Episcopal Church, Lamar, Colorado
- St. Peter the Apostle Episcopal Church, Pueblo, Colorado
- St. Raphael Episcopal Church, Colorado Springs, Colorado

=== Southwestern ===
- All Saints in the Mountains, Crested Butte, Colorado
- Church of the Good Samaritan, Gunnison, Colorado
- Little Shepherd of the Hills Episcopal Chapel, Crestone, Colorado
- St. Augustine's Episcopal Chapel, Creede, Colorado
- St. Barnabas of the Valley, Cortez, Colorado
- St. Francis of Assisi, South Fork, Colorado
- St. James Episcopal Church, Lake City, Colorado
- St. John Episcopal Church, Ouray, Colorado
- St. Luke's Episcopal Church, Delta, Colorado
- St. Mark's Episcopal Church, Durango, Colorado
- St. Matthew Episcopal Church, Grand Junction, Colorado
- St. Patrick Episcopal Church, Pagosa Springs, Colorado
- St. Paul Episcopal Church, Montrose, Colorado
- St. Paul's Church, Mancos, Colorado
- St. Stephen the Martyr, Monte Vista, Colorado
- St. Thomas the Apostle, Alamosa, Colorado
- The Church of the Nativity, Grand Junction, Colorado

== List of bishops ==
Missionary bishops over Colorado
From	Until	Incumbent	Notes
1865	1873	George Maxwell Randall	(November 23, 1810, Warren, RI – September 28, 1873, Denver, CO); missionary bishop over Colorado and adjacent areas including Montana (until 1867), Idaho (until 1867), Wyoming and New Mexico (from 1867); died in office.
1873	1886	John Franklin Spalding	(August 25, 1828, Belgrade, ME – March 9, 1902, Erie, PA); missionary bishop over Colorado and adjacent areas including New Mexico (until 1881) and Wyoming (until 1886); became first Bishop of Colorado
Bishops of Colorado
1886	1902	John Franklin Spalding	Hitherto missionary bishop in Colorado; Western Colorado split off in 1892; died in office.
1902	1918	Charles Sanford Olmsted	(February 8, 1853, Olmstedville, NY – October 21, 1918); previously coadjutor since 1902; died in office.
1918	1938	Irving P. Johnson	Irving Peake Johnson (1866–1947); previously coadjutor since 1917.
1938	1949	Fred Ingley	Frederick "Fred" Ingley (November 20, 1878, Staffordshire, United Kingdom – ?); previously coadjutor since 1921.
1949	1955	Harold L. Bowen	Harold Linwood Bowen; previously coadjutor since 1947.
1955	1969	Joseph S. Minnis	Joseph Summerville Minnis (born 1903/4); forcibly deposed and banished from the diocese and state, 24 September 1968.
1958	1960	Daniel Corrigan, suffragan bishop	Daniel "Dan" N. Corrigan (October 25, 1900, Rochester, MN – September 21, 1994)
1969	1973	Edwin B. Thayer	Edwin Burton Thayer (February 7, 1905 – October 8, 1989, Denver); previously coadjutor since 1960.
1973	1990	William Frey	William Carl "Bill" Frey (born February 26, 1930, Waco, TX); previously bishop in charge, Honduras.
1981	1988	William H. Wolfrum, suffragan bishop	William Harvey "Dub" Wolfrum (January 16, 1926 – November 24, 2007, Fort Collins, CO); became interim Bishop of Navajoland.
1987	2006	William Davidson, assistant bishop	William "Bill" Davidson (July 20, 1919, Miles City, MT – May 8, 2006, Loveland, CO); retired Bishop of Western Kansas; previously assistant in Ohio.
1991	2004	William Jerry Winterrowd	William Jerry Winterrowd, called Jerry (born July 24, 1938, Shreveport, LA); retired January 2004.
2004	2019	Robert O'Neill	Robert John "Rob" O'Neill; previously coadjutor since 2003.
2019	present	Kimberly Lucas	
