= St. Mark's Episcopal Church (Beaver Dam, Wisconsin) =

Historic church in Wisconsin, United States

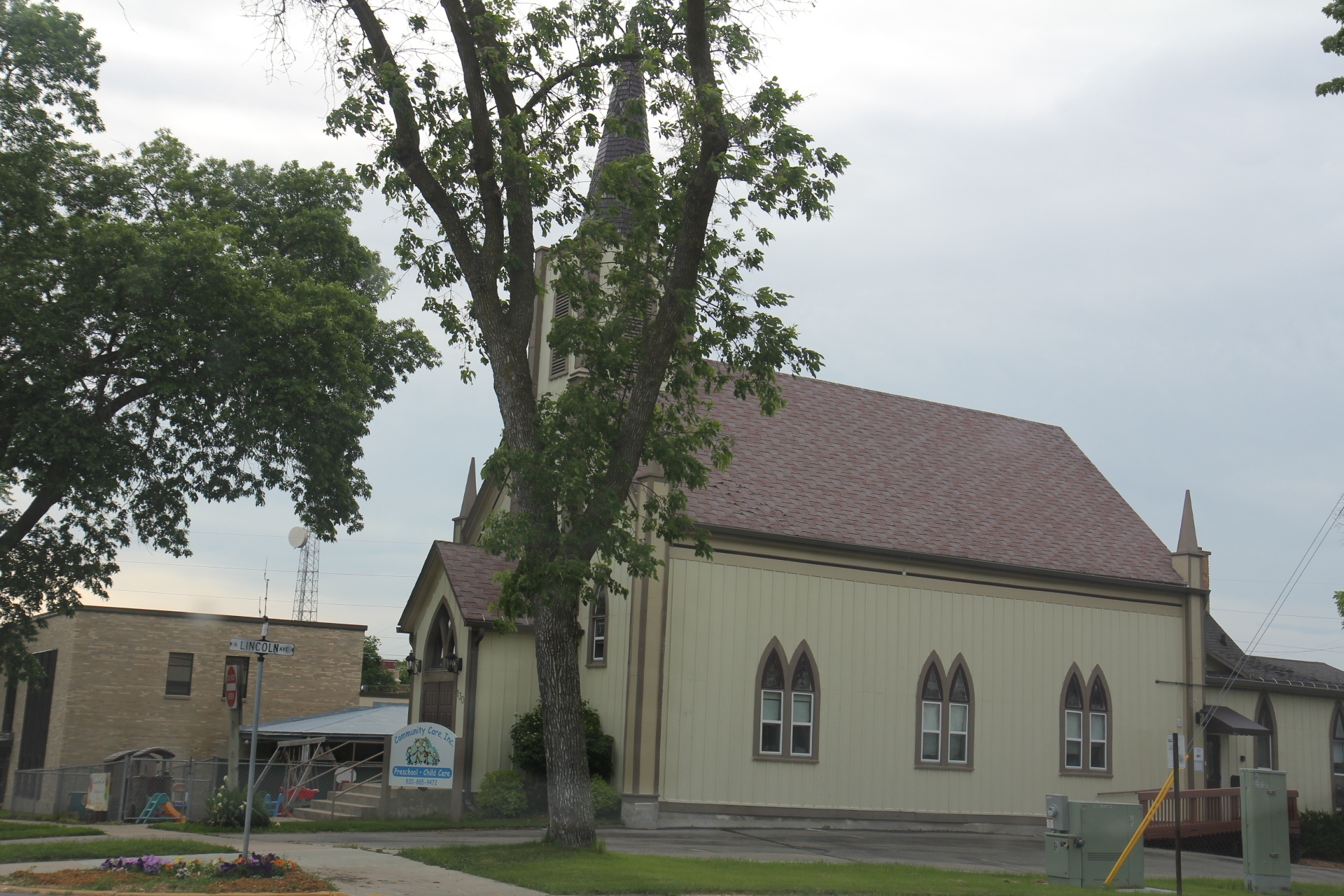
The old St. Mark's Episcopal Church in 2014

Old St. Mark's Episcopal Church building is located in Beaver Dam, Wisconsin and was built in 1858. The congregation moved to the present site on East Mill Street in 1978, previously used as a Pentecostal church. Old Saint Mark's, on East Maple at North Lincoln Avenue, now a child care facility, was added to the National Register of Historic Places in 1980. Saint Mark's Church is part of the Episcopal Diocese of Wisconsin.
