= Gethsemane Episcopal Church (Minneapolis, Minnesota) =

Historic church in Minnesota, United States

- U.S. National Register of Historic Places
- Minneapolis Landmark
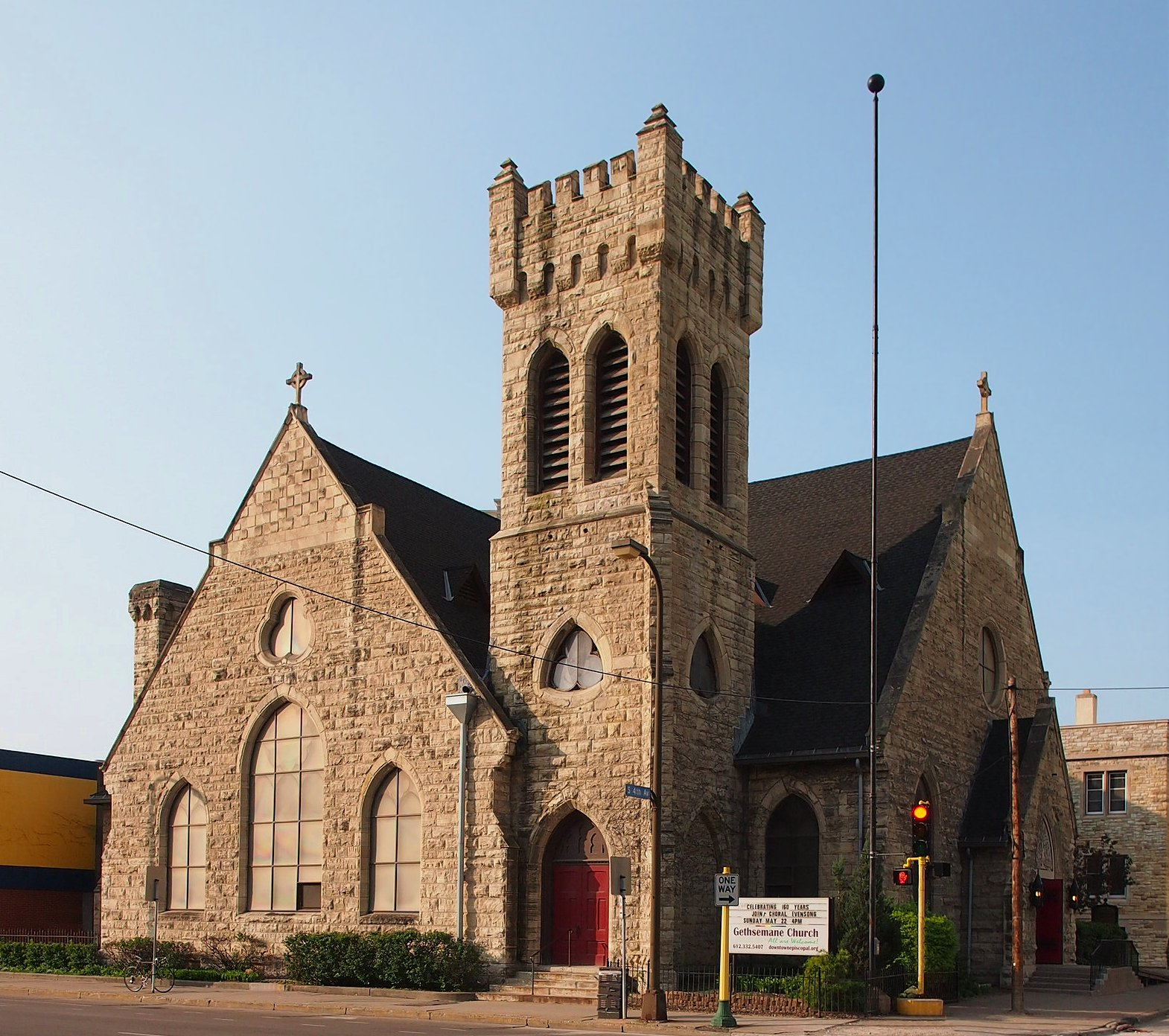
- Gethsemane Episcopal Church from the north

- Location within Minnesota Location within the United States
- Location: 901-905 4th Ave., S., Minneapolis, Minnesota
- Coordinates: 44°58′20″N 93°16′5.5″W
- Built: 1883-1884
- Architect: Edward S. Stebbins
- Architectural style: Late Gothic Revival
- NRHP reference No.: 84001424

Significant dates
- Added to NRHP: March 8, 1984
- Designated MPLSL: 1983

Gethsemane Episcopal Church is an historic church in downtown Minneapolis, Minnesota, United States, listed on the National Register of Historic Places. It is one of the oldest extant churches in Minneapolis and is significant for its Gothic Revival architecture.

Architect Edward Stebbins modeled the church on small Gothic style churches in rural England. It is proportioned rather broadly, as opposed having tall proportions, which is rather unusual for churches designed in the late 19th century. The area surrounding the church was primarily residential when it was first built, but it is now surrounded by commercial development.

In 1895, Gethsemane was the main location of the first Episcopal Church General Convention west of the Mississippi River.

Faced with reduced membership and financial struggle, the final Sunday morning service at Gethsemane occurred on Christ the King Sunday in November 2019. The church had reported 77 members in 2017 and 30 members in 2023 (due to a home church that splintered off for a time as parishioners found new faith communities); no membership statistics were reported in 2024 parochial reports. Plate and pledge income reported for the congregation in 2024 was $0.00 with average Sunday attendance (ASA) of zero persons.

On Wednesday October 28, 2026, former members of the congregation, the final priest of Gethsemane, the Very Rev. Cindi Brickson, the Board of Trustees, members of the Standing Committee, and other community members gathered as Bishop Craig Loya deconsecrated the sanctuary. Since the church’s closing in 2019, the Tiffany window depicting Jesus in the garden of Gethsemane has been removed. All other stained glass and fixtures remain.

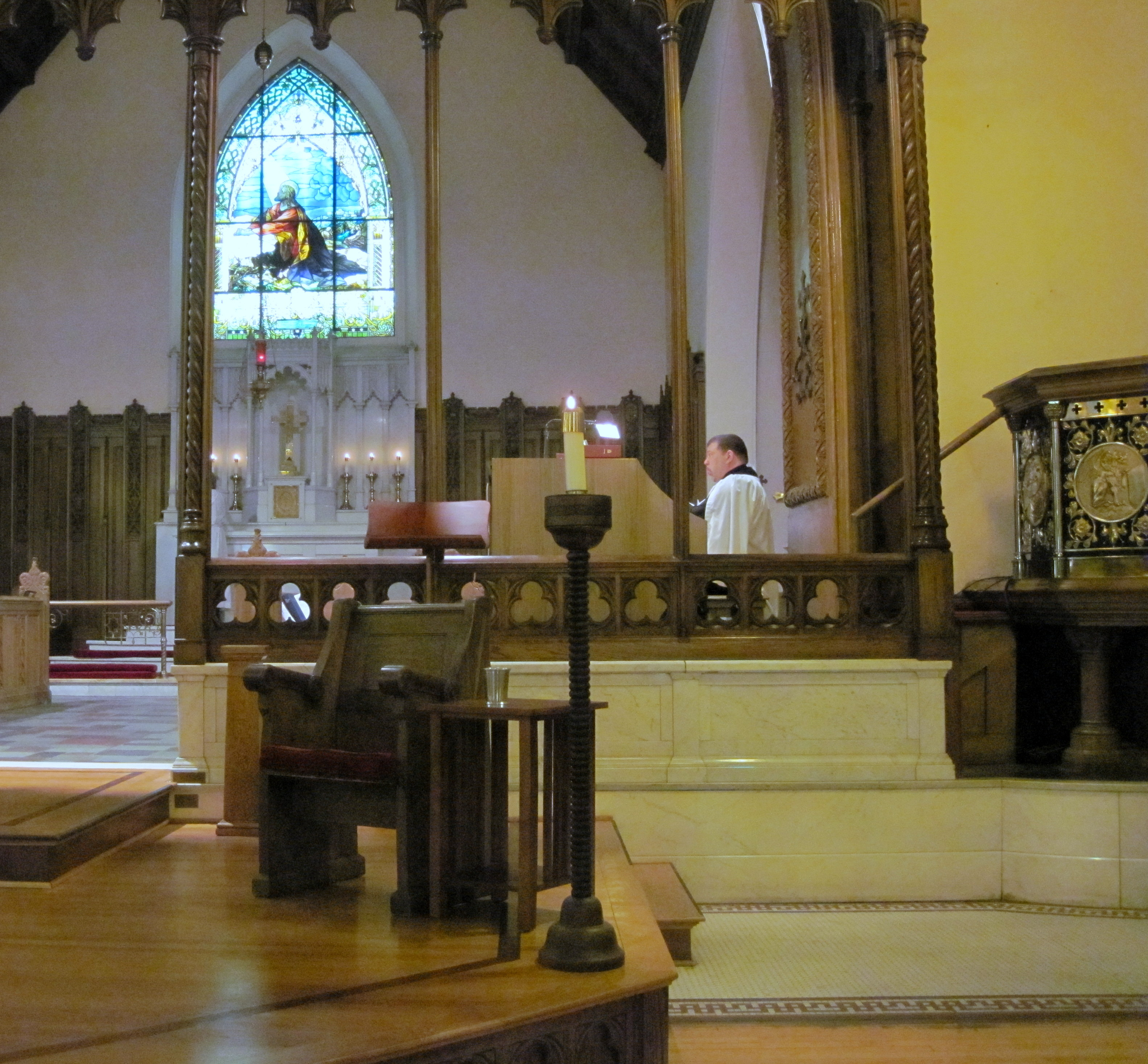
Gethsemane interior
