= Cathedral of St. John in the Wilderness =

Historic church in Denver, Colorado, United States

- Saint John's Cathedral
- U.S. National Register of Historic Places
- Colorado State Register of Historic Properties
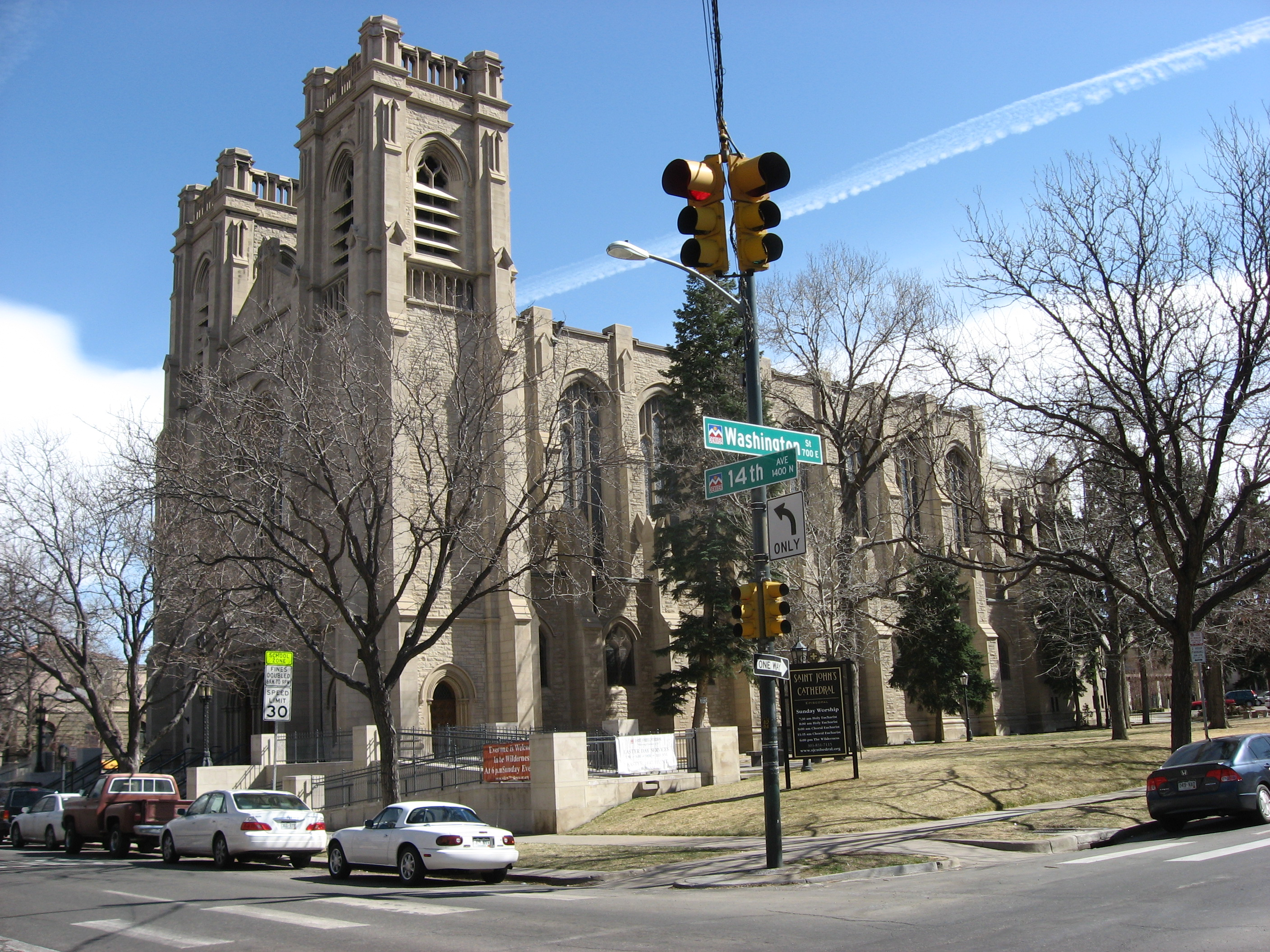
- Streetside view of the cathedral, March 2009

- Location within Colorado Location within the United States
- Location: 14th and Washington streets Denver, Colorado; United States
- Coordinates: 39°44′18″N 104°58′41″W
- Built: 1909-1911
- Architect: Tracy and Swartwout
- Architectural style: Late Gothic Revival
- Website: https://sjcathedral.org
- NRHP reference No.: 75000513
- CSRHP No.: 5DV.171
- Added to NRHP: August 1, 1975

Saint John's Cathedral in Denver, Colorado, United States is the seat of the bishop and the cathedral of the Episcopal Diocese of Colorado and part of the Episcopal Church in the United States. Construction began in 1909, the first service held in the cathedral in 1911, and it was added to the National Register of Historic Places in 1975. In 2020, it reported 2,259 members, 618 average attendance, and $2,097,039 in plate and pledge financial assistance.

== History ==
Father John H. Kehler traveled from Virginia to the group of mining camps known as Denver City in January 1860 and delivered the first public services of the Episcopal Church in what would become Colorado Territory. He eventually established the parish of St. John's in the Wilderness, so named because the nearest Episcopal parish was seven hundred miles away in Kansas.

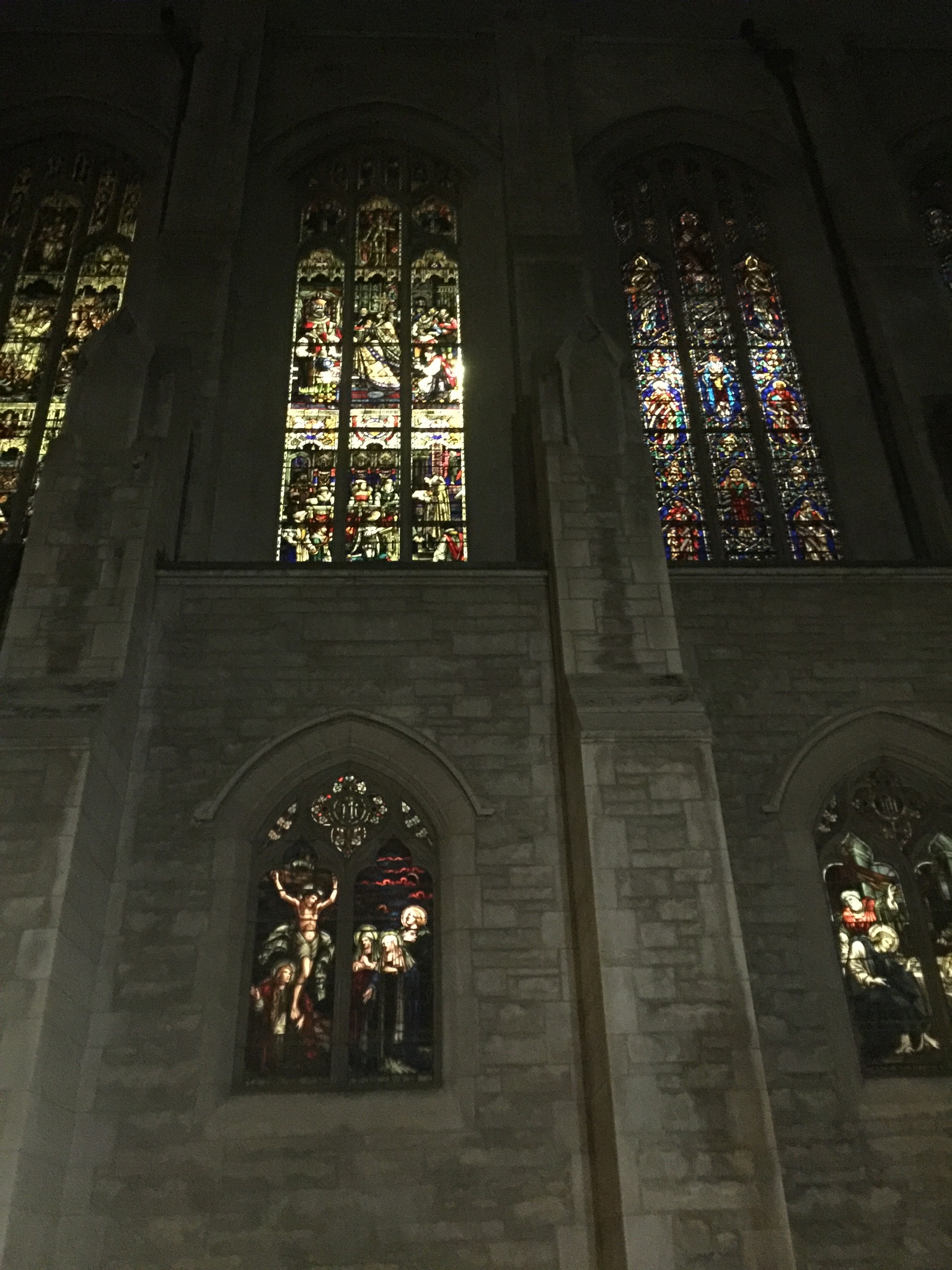
St. John’s stained glass windows at night, August 2018

The first cathedral was at 20th and Welton and held its first services in 1881. Dean H. Martyn Hart was the first dean of the cathedral and he worked with other Denver clergy in 1887 to create the Denver Charity Organization, the first community charity solicitation fund in the United States - later renamed the United Way.

A fire at the church in 1903 led to the construction of the current cathedral block at 14th and Washington. In 1908 a blind contest was held and the design of New York architectural firm of Tracy and Swartwout was selected. Work began on Saint John's Cathedral in 1908. The original design made use of flying buttresses to support the weight of the roof. This design allows for thinner walls and more glass area. The buttressed design was considered too expensive to build, so a redesign was requested which limited the cathedral to the nave and provided a temporary brick chancel. The foundation was then completed from this design. Bids for this revised design were still too high, so another redesign was requested, this third design excluded the buttresses and consequently had thicker heavier walls. The result of the installed foundation being too small to support the increased weight of the newest design's thicker and heavier walls resulted in the cathedral sinking during construction. Some walls and the center arch between the towers had to be disassembled and foundation corrected before building could resume. A lawsuit brought against Tracy and Swartwout was dismissed, as the building committee was found to be at fault. The two transepts, choir and great tower were never built. Only the nave was completed of limestone with a "temporary" brick chancel. The height of the ceiling in the Nave is 65 feet. It is 185 feet long and 52 feet wide. Dean Hart led the construction committee and hosted its first services in 1911.

The stained glass was created by Charles Connick's studio.

United States Supreme Court Associate Justice Byron White was buried at St. John's Cathedral in 2002.

The Very Rev. Richard Lawson was installed as the cathedral's dean in 2017.

== See also ==
- National Register of Historic Places listings in downtown Denver
- List of the Episcopal cathedrals of the United States
- List of cathedrals in the United States
- List of burial places of justices of the Supreme Court of the United States
- Pipe Organ Database
