= Henry Y. Satterlee =

American bishop (1843–1908)

The Right Reverend Henry Yates Satterlee
- Bishop of Washington
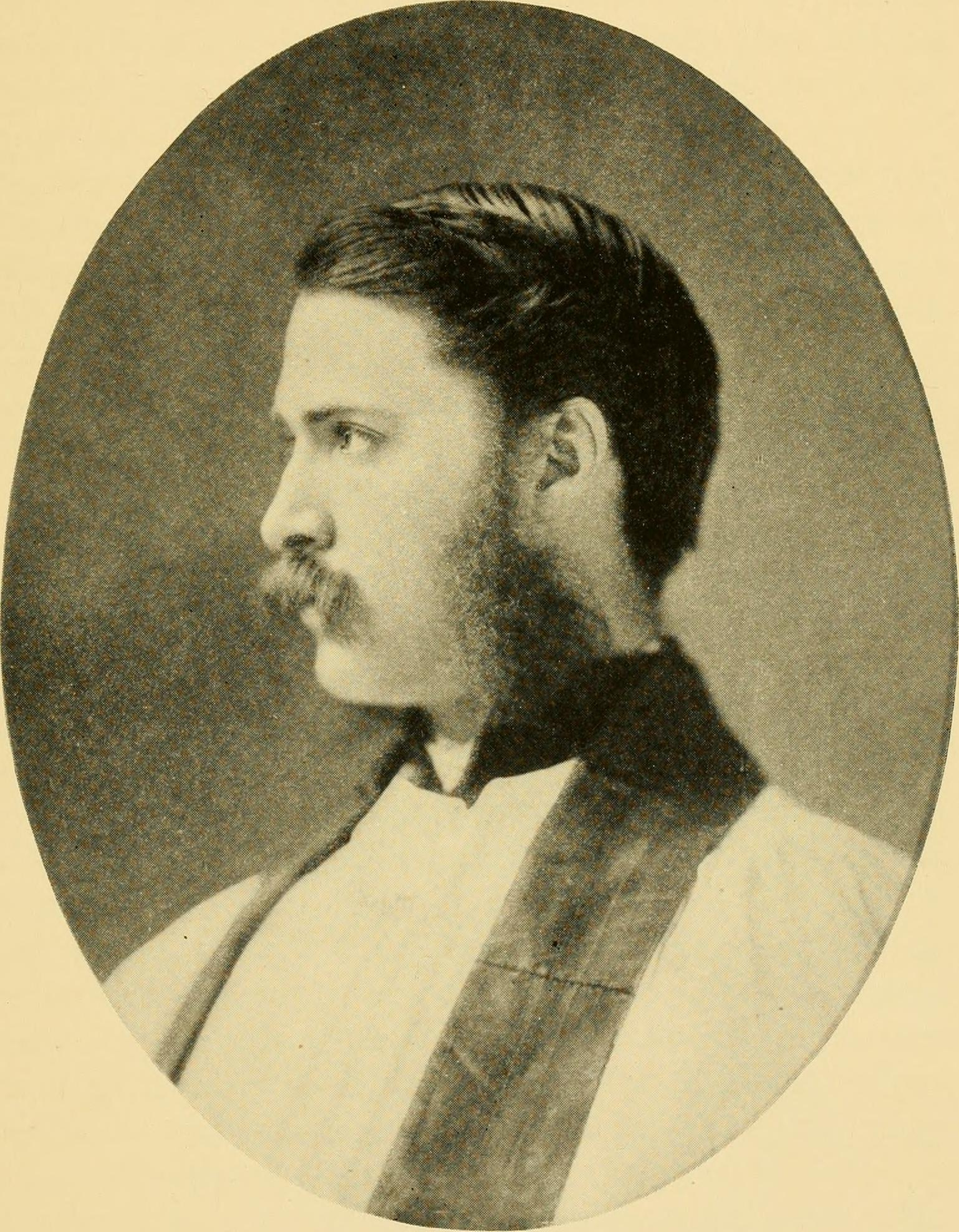
- Church: Episcopal Church
- Diocese: Washington
- Elected: December 4, 1895
- In office: 1896–1908
- Predecessor: None
- Successor: Alfred Harding

Orders
- Ordination: January 11, 1867 by Horatio Potter
- Consecration: March 25, 1896 by Arthur Cleveland Coxe

Personal details
- Born: January 11, 1843 New York City, United States
- Died: February 22, 1908 (aged 65) Washington, D.C., United States
- Buried: Bethlehem Chapel of Washington National Cathedral
- Denomination: Anglican
- Parents: Edward Satterlee & Jane Anna Yates
- Spouse: Jane Lawrence Churchill
- Education: Columbia University; General Theological Seminary

Henry Yates Satterlee (January 11, 1843 – February 22, 1908) was the first Episcopal Bishop of Washington, serving from 1896 to 1908. He established the Cathedral Church of Saint Peter and Saint Paul, popularly known as Washington National Cathedral.

== Biography ==
=== Early life ===
He was born on January 11, 1843, at the corner of Greenwich and Carlyle Streets, New York City the son of Edward Satterlee and Jane Anna Yates, the daughter Henry Christopher Yates, an attorney-at-law; and for a number of years a New York State Senator and member of the Council of Appointment and Catharine, daughter of Johannes Mynderse and a grand niece of Joseph Christopher Yates, who was an American lawyer, politician. statesman, and founding trustee of Union College. He was also a descendant of Jellis Douwese Fonda, who emigrated in 1642 to the Dutch colony of New Netherland (New York).

His uncle was Charles Yates, a Brigadier-General during the American Civil War. Charles' daughter, Stella Yates (November 23, 1866 - February 2, 1929), married on June 10, 1891, in New York City, Benjamin Brewster, the son of the Rev. Joseph Brewster and Sarah Jane Bunce. He was the Episcopal Bishop of Maine and Missionary Bishop of Western Colorado.

=== Education ===
He graduated from Columbia University in 1863, and in 1866 graduated from the General Theological Seminary, New York City.

=== Marriage and personal life ===
He married on June 30, 1866, Jane Lawrence Churchill, the daughter of Timothy Gridley Churchill and Patience Lawrence. They were the parents of two children. Their son, the Rev. Churchill Satterlee, was a clergyman of the Episcopal Church. Their daughter, Constance Satterlee, married Frederick W. Rhinelander, the brother of Philip M. Rhinelander, the seventh Episcopal Bishop of Pennsylvania.

=== Ordination ===
On November 21, 1865, he was ordained a deacon in the Protestant Episcopal Church, and a priest on January 11, 1867. He was assistant rector of Zion Parish at Wappingers Falls, in Dutchess County, New York starting in 1865, and became its rector in 1875. He was rector of Calvary Church, New York from 1882 until 1896 when he became the Bishop of Washington, D.C. While at Calvary, he had been active in mission work to the poor in the city's Lower East Side. Satterlee gained international respect for his integrity and leadership and he also worked hard to promote the black clergy of the diocese. In 1888, he declined election as Assistant Bishop of Ohio and in 1889 declined election as Bishop of Michigan.

=== Consecration ===
On March 25, 1896, he was consecrated the first Episcopal Bishop of Washington at Calvary Church, New York City. The consecrator was to have been Bishop John Williams (1817-1899) of Connecticut, the presiding Bishop, but his fragile condition prevented him from attending. In his place, the Right Reverend Arthur Cleveland Coxe (1818-1896), Second Bishop of Western New York, presided, assisted by the Right Reverend Henry Codman Potter (1835-1908), Seventh Bishop of New York. Henry Yates Satterlee was the first Episcopal Bishop of Washington, serving from 1896 to 1908. He established the Cathedral Church of Saint Peter and Saint Paul, popularly known as Washington National Cathedral. He was responsible for acquiring its land atop Mt. Saint Alban in Northwest Washington and overseeing its construction in the 14th century English Gothic style, envisioning the role of the cathedral in state and world affairs.

=== Honors awarded ===
He received an honorary degree of D.D. from Union College in 1882 and from Princeton University in 1896; and that of LL.D from Columbia University in 1897.

=== Death ===
He died on February 22, 1908, in Washington, D.C. He is buried in the Bethlehem Chapel of Washington National Cathedral.

=== List of works ===
He is the author of Christ and his Church (1878); Life Lessons of the Prayer Book (1890); A Creedless Gospel and the Gospel Creed (1894); New Testament Churchmanship (1899); The calling of the Christian and Christ's Sacrament of Fellowship (1902) and The Building of a Cathedral (1901).

== Gallery ==
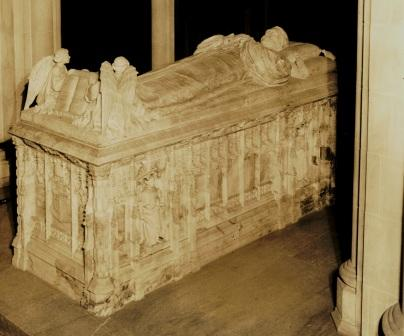
Satterlee Tomb, Washington National Cathedral

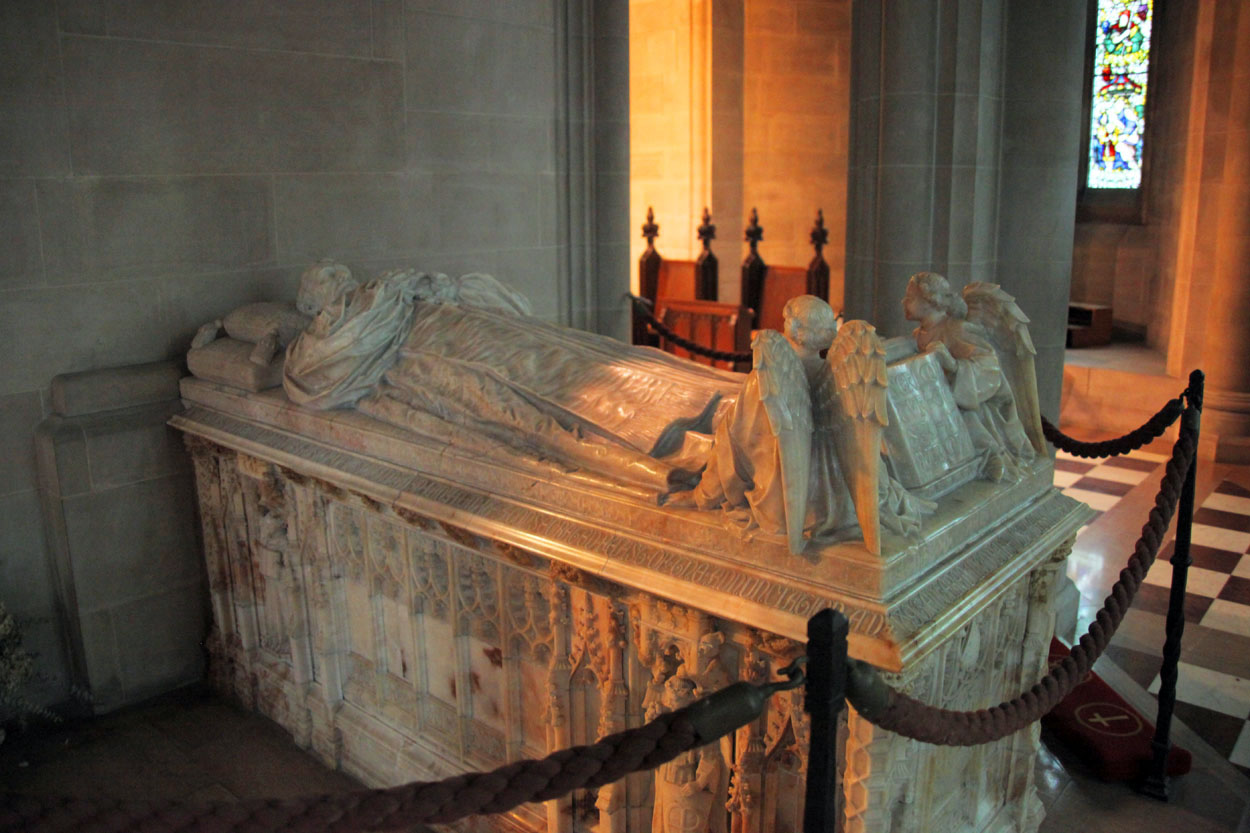
Satterlee Tomb, Washington National Cathedral

== Notes ==
Episcopal Church (USA) titles
Preceded by None	Bishop of Washington; 1896–1908	Succeeded by Alfred Harding
