= Episcopal Diocese of Nevada =

Diocese of the Episcopal Church in the United States

Diocese of Nevada

Location
- Country: United States
- Territory: Nevada
- Ecclesiastical province: Province VIII
- Headquarters: Las Vegas, Nevada
- Coordinates: 36°01′03″N 115°07′02″W

Statistics
- Congregations: 27 (2025)
- Members: 3,385 (2025)

Information
- Denomination: Episcopal Church
- Established: April 14, 1971
- Cathedral: Trinity Cathedral

Current leadership
- Bishop: Elizabeth Bonforte Gardner

Map
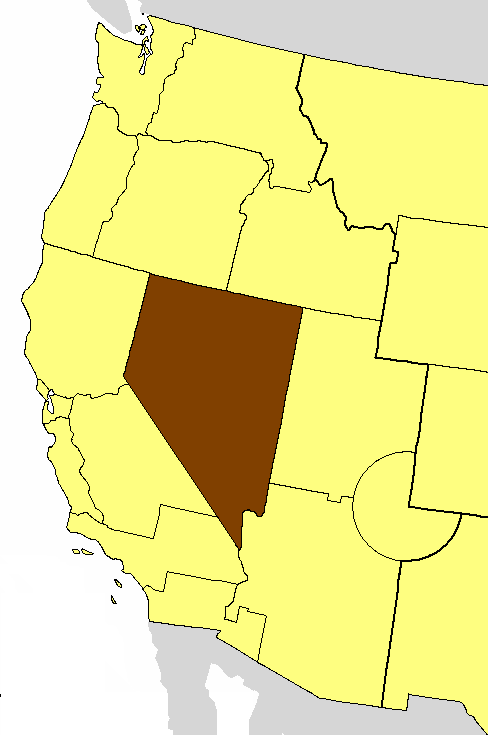
- Location of the Diocese of Nevada

Website
- ednv.org

The Episcopal Diocese of Nevada is the diocese of the Episcopal Church in the USA which comprises the entire State of Nevada. The Right Rev. Elizabeth Bonforte Gardner is the eleventh and current bishop of the Diocese; she was ordained and consecrated by Presiding Bishop Michael Curry at Christ Church Episcopal in Las Vegas on March 5, 2022. On October 8, 2021, Gardner was elected bishop of the Episcopal Diocese of Nevada.

In 2025, the diocese reported average Sunday attendance (ASA) of 1,570 persons, a decline from 2,648 in 2017. The most recent membership statistics (2025) showed 3,385 persons in 27 churches, down from 5,669 in 2017. It reported plate and pledge financial support in 2025 of $3,449,106.

The cathedral is Trinity Episcopal Cathedral, located in Reno. It was designated in December 2016.

In 1971, Nevada achieved separate diocesan status. Under the leadership of diocesan bishop Wesley Frensdorff, who served from 1972 to 1985, Nevada became a leader in the concept of Total Ministry, the "ministry of all the baptized," in which laity and clergy have an equal share in ministry.

The ninth bishop of Nevada, the Right Reverend Katharine Jefferts Schori, was elected the 26th Presiding Bishop of the Episcopal Church at the 2006 General Convention, becoming the first female primate in the Anglican Communion.

The Diocese works to be faithfully engaged in civic society with people of all faiths through Nevadans for the Common Good, Clergy and Laity United for Economic Justice, the Nevada Faith and Justice Alliance, Communities in Schools, All Our Children, Bread for the World and other groups working for justice and mercy.

== Bishops ==
These are the bishops who have served the region now known as the state of Nevada:

Bishops

- Joseph Cruickshank Talbot, Missionary, Northwest Diocese (1860 - 1869)
- Ozi William Whitaker, Missionary, Nevada and Arizona, (1869 - 1886)
- Abiel Leonard, Missionary, Utah and Nevada, (1888 - 1903)
- Henry Douglas Robinson (1908 - 1913)
- George Coolidge Hunting (1914 - 1924)
- Thomas Jenkins (1929 - 1942)
- William F. Lewis (1942 - 1959)
- William Godsell Wright (1960-1972)
- Wesley Frensdorff (1972 - 1985)
- Stewart Clark Zabriskie (1986 - 1999)
- Katharine Jefferts Schori (2001 - 2006)
  * Jerry A. Lamb, Assisting (2007)
- Dan Thomas Edwards (2008 - 2018)
  *James Edward Waggoner, Assisting (2018-2022)
- Elizabeth Bonforte Gardner (2022 - current)

== See also ==
- Katharine Jefferts Schori, 26th Presiding Bishop
- Succession list of Episcopal bishops
- Total Ministry
