= William Godsell Wright =

American Episcopal prelate

The Right Reverend William Godsell Wright D.D.
- Bishop of Nevada
- Church: Episcopal Church
- Diocese: Nevada
- Elected: 1959
- In office: 1960–1972
- Predecessor: William F. Lewis
- Successor: Wesley Frensdorff

Orders
- Ordination: December 1930 by Edward Campion Acheson
- Consecration: February 4, 1960 by Arthur C. Lichtenberger

Personal details
- Born: March 13, 1904 Greenville, Illinois, United States
- Died: August 4, 1973 (aged 69) Reno, Nevada, United States
- Denomination: Anglican
- Parents: William Clifford Wright and Edith Browning
- Spouse: Marion Swannell (m. 1930)
- Children: 2

William Godsell Wright (March 13, 1904 – August 4, 1973) was an Episcopal prelate who served as Bishop of Nevada from 1960 to 1972.

== Education ==
Wright was born on March 13, 1904, in Greenville, Illinois, the son of William Clifford Wright and Edith Browning. He was educated in the public school of Corpus Christi, Texas and then at the Greenville High School. He graduated with a bachelor's degree from the University of Illinois in 1927 and later from the General Theological Seminary with a Bachelor of Sacred Theology in 1930. He was awarded a Doctor of Divinity from Daniel Baker College in 1952.

== Ordained Ministry ==
Wright was ordained deacon in April 1930 by Bishop John Chanler White of Springfield and priest in December 1930 by Bishop Edward Campion Acheson of Connecticut. After ordination, he became assistant minister at St Paul's Church in New Haven, Connecticut from 1930 until 1933 and then rector of Trinity Church in Newtown, Connecticut between 1933 and 1938. Later he transferred to Trinity Church in Wethersfield, Connecticut where he served as rector from 1938 to 1940. In 1941 he became associate rector of St Paul's Church in Cleveland Heights, Ohio and later as rector of St Clement's Church in El Paso, Texas in 1943. In 1953, he also became the director of the National Council's Home Department.

== Bishop ==
In 1959 Wright was elected missionary Bishop of Nevada. He was consecrated on February 4, 1960, by presiding Bishop Arthur C. Lichtenberger in Trinity Church in Reno, Nevada. During his time in Nevada, four new Episcopal churches were established in the state. He was also the first diocesan bishop of Nevada after the diocese was created in 1971. He retired by the end of 1971.
