= Henry Douglas Robinson =

The Right Reverend Henry Douglas Robinson D.D.
- Missionary Bishop of Nevada
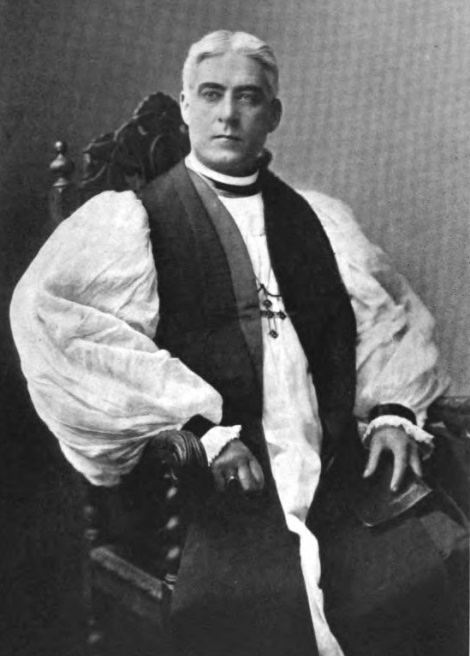
- Church: Episcopal Church
- Diocese: Nevada
- Elected: October 1907
- In office: 1908–1913
- Predecessor: Abiel Leonard
- Successor: George Coolidge Hunting

Orders
- Ordination: February 8, 1888 by John Wingfield
- Consecration: March 25, 1908 by Daniel S. Tuttle

Personal details
- Born: March 15, 1859 Lowell, Massachusetts, United States
- Died: December 18, 1913 (aged 54) New York City, NY, United States
- Denomination: Anglican
- Parents: Alexander Douglas & Clara Boate
- Spouse: Florence Bruce

Henry Douglas Robinson (March 15, 1859 - December 18, 1913) was missionary bishop of the Episcopal Diocese of Nevada.

== Education and career ==
Robinson was born on March 15, 1859, in Lowell, Massachusetts, the son of Alexander Douglas and Clara Boate. He graduated from Racine College with a Bachelor of Arts in 1884 and with a Master of Arts in 1887. In 1902, he also received an honorary Doctor of Divinity from the same college. He was an instructor of mathematics at San Mateo, California Military Academy between 1885 and 1889 and served as Headmaster between 1889 and 1900. In 1900, he became the warden of Racine College. He was ordained deacon on September 19, 1886, by Bishop William Ingraham Kip of California in Grace Church, San Francisco. He was then advanced to the priesthood on February 8, 1888, by Bishop John Henry Ducachet Wingfield of Northern California.

== Bishop ==
In 1907, Robinson was elected as the Missionary Bishop of Nevada. He was consecrated on March 25, 1908, by Presiding Bishop Daniel S. Tuttle in St Luke's Church in Racine, Wisconsin. He was also a bishop associate of the Confraternity of the Blessed Sacrament. He died in office on December 18, 1913, in St. Luke's Hospital, New York City.
