= Charles Yates =

Brigadier-General during American Civil War

- Born: March 1, 1808; Schenectady, New York, United States
- Died: September 26, 1870 (aged 62); New York City, New York, United States
- Allegiance: United States
- Service / branch: United States Army
- Rank: Brigadier-General

Charles Yates (March 1, 1808 – September 26, 1870) was a Brigadier-General during the American Civil War in command of the volunteer depot of New York City in 1861.

== Biography ==
He was born on March 1, 1808, in Schenectady, New York, the fourth of six children and the third son of Henry Christopher Yates, an attorney-at-law; and for a number of years a New York State Senator and member of the Council of Appointment and Catharine, daughter of Johannes Mynderse and a grand nephew of Joseph Christopher Yates, who was an American lawyer, politician, statesman, and founding trustee of Union College. He was also a descendant of Jellis Douwese Fonda, who emigrated in 1642 to the Dutch colony of New Netherland (New York).

His younger sister, Jane Anna Yates married Edward Satterlee. They were the parents of Henry Yates Satterlee (1843 – 1908) who was the first Episcopal Bishop of Washington, serving from 1896 to 1908.

He graduated from Union College in 1829. He was admitted to the bar and commenced practice first in Schenectady and later in New York City. He married as his first wife Cordelia Rowe, the daughter of James Rowe. They resided in New York City where they had a son and three daughters. Cordelia died at the age of 30 on August 19, 1856. He married as his second wife, Josephine Bosworth the daughter of New York Supreme Court Chief Justice Joseph Sollace Bosworth and Frances Pumpelly. Frances was the first cousin of Raphael Pumpelly, an American geologist and explorer. Charles and Josephine had two daughters, Stella and Frances.

Their daughter, Stella Yates (November 23, 1866 – February 2, 1929), married on June 10, 1891, in New York City, Benjamin Brewster, the son of the Rev. Joseph Brewster and Sarah Jane Bunce. He was a direct descendant of both Love Brewster, a passenger with his father, mother and brother, Wrestling, aboard the Mayflower and a founder of the town of Bridgewater, Massachusetts; and of Elder William Brewster, the Pilgrim colonist leader and spiritual elder of the Plymouth Colony, and passenger aboard the Mayflower and one of the signers of the Mayflower Compact. the Episcopal Bishop of Maine and Missionary Bishop of Western Colorado.

Col. Yates commanded the Fourth Regiment of the Second Brigade of the First Division of the New York State Militia before being promoted to brigadier-general and command of the brigade in the mid-1850s. Brig. Gen. Yates resigned his commission as commander of the New York National Guard 2nd Brigade in May 1866. He was also the brigade commander of New York City's First Irish Brigade.

In April 1881 New York Supreme Court heard a case involving Yates' daughters and the estate of his first father-in-law, James Rowe. Judge Larremore ruled that Stella and Frances Yates — the daughters from Yates' second marriage — were entitled to the inheritance of their deceased half-sister Catharine, who died in 1874.

He died on September 26, 1870, in New York City.
