= Thomas Jenkins (bishop) =

English bishop

The Right Reverend Thomas Jenkins D.D.
- Missionary Bishop of Nevada
- Church: Episcopal Church
- Diocese: Nevada
- In office: 1929–1942
- Predecessor: George Coolidge Hunting
- Successor: William F. Lewis

Orders
- Ordination: June 20, 1901 by Boyd Vincent
- Consecration: January 25, 1929 by John Gardner Murray

Personal details
- Born: January 31, 1871 Shenley, Buckinghamshire, England
- Died: May 28, 1955 (aged 84) Anaheim, California, United States
- Denomination: Anglican
- Parents: John Jenkins & Mary Ann Boyles
- Spouse: Ruth Mary Prichard (m. 1901; died 1940) Edith Smith (m. 1942)
- Children: 7

Thomas Jenkins (January 31, 1871 – May 28, 1955) was a missionary bishop of The Episcopal Church, serving Nevada from 1929 to 1942 and later in Oregon.

== Education ==
Jenkins was born on January 31, 1871, in Shenley, Hertfordshire, England, the son of John Jenkins and Mary Ann Boyles. He emigrated to the United States at the age of 19. He studied at Kenyon College and Bexley Hall from where he graduated with a Bachelor of Divinity in 1914 and a Doctor of Divinity in 1924.

== Ordination ==
Jenkins was ordained deacon on June 29, 1900 in St John's Church, Worthington, Ohio, and priest on June 20, 1901 in St Paul Cathedral, Cincinnati. He was involved in missionary work as a member of the Cincinnati Associate Mission, between 1900 and 1902. He was also a missionary in Alaska from 1902 till 1910. He served as rector of St Paul's Church in Fremont, Ohio between 1910 and 1915 and later as rector of St David's Church in Portland, Oregon till 1925. In 1925 he became General missionary and educational secretary of the Diocese of Oregon.

== Bishop ==
In 1928 Jenkins was elected missionary Bishop of Nevada and was consecrated on January 25, 1929, in Trinity Church in Portland, Oregon. He remained in Nevada till May 1942 when he resigned. After his retirement he wrote the biography of Bishop Peter Trimble Rowe of Alaska and spent time doing missionary work in Oregon. He became assistant bishop of the Episcopal Diocese of Long Island in 1946, a post he held till 1949.

== Personal life ==
Jenkins married Ruth Mary Prichard on August 15, 1901. After her death, he married Edith Smith in May 1942.
