= Stewart Clark Zabriskie =

Diocesan bishop in Nevada, USA

The Right Reverend Stewart Clark Zabriskie D.D.
- Bishop of Nevada
- Church: Episcopal Church
- Diocese: Nevada
- In office: 1986–September 13, 1999
- Predecessor: Wesley Frensdorff
- Successor: Katharine Jefferts Schori

Orders
- Ordination: 1963
- Consecration: September 3, 1986 by Edmond L. Browning

Personal details
- Born: November 7, 1937 White Plains, New York, United States
- Died: September 13, 1999 (aged 61) Reno, Nevada, United States
- Denomination: Anglican
- Parents: Cornelius Zabriskie and Florence I. Caffrey
- Spouse: Sarah Kirby Miller (m. 1963)
- Children: 2

Stewart Clark Zabriskie (November 7, 1937 – September 13, 1999) was second diocesan bishop of the Episcopal Diocese of Nevada from 1986 to 1999.

== Early life and education ==
Zabriskie was born on November 7, 1937, in White Plains, New York, the son of Cornelius Zabriskie and Florence I. Caffrey. He was educated at the Mount Herman Prep School in New York. He also graduated with a B.A. from Yale University in 1958 and the General Theological Seminary in 1963. He also received an honorary Doctor of Divinity from the General Theological Seminary in 1986. On September 14, 1963, he married Sarah Kirby Miller at Calvary Church, New York City.

== Ordained ministry ==
He was ordained deacon and priest in 1963. He served as assistant to the rector of the Church of the Incarnation in New York City between 1963 and 1965. He became rector of St Mary's Church in Scarborough, New York between 1966 and 1969. In 1969 be served as assistant to the rector of St John's Church in Pleasantville, New York and in 1973 transferred to Minnesota to become rector of St Andrew's Church in Cloquet and Christ Church in Proctor. In 1977 he became rector of the Church of the Epiphany in Plymouth, Minnesota.

== Bishop ==
Zabriskie was elected and consecrated Bishop of Nevada in 1986. He died suddenly of heart failure, whilst in office, on September 13, 1999. He was survived by his wife Sarah Kirby Miller, whom he married on September 14, 1963, and his son and daughter. He was succeeded by Katharine Jefferts Schori as Bishop of Nevada, who later became Presiding Bishop and Primate.
