= Clarence Haden =

Bishop of the Episcopal Diocese of Northern California

The Right Reverend Clarence Haden
- Bishop of Northern California
- Church: Episcopal Church
- Diocese: Northern California
- Elected: 1957
- In office: 1958-1978
- Predecessor: Archie W. N. Porter
- Successor: John Lester Thompson
- Previous post: Coadjutor Bishop of Sacramento (1957)

Orders
- Ordination: April 1936 (deacon); November 1936 (priest) by Harry Tunis Moore
- Consecration: June 14, 1957 by Henry Knox Sherrill

Personal details
- Born: May 30, 1910 Fort Worth, Texas, United States
- Died: March 11, 2000 (aged 89) Charleston, South Carolina, United States
- Denomination: Anglican
- Parents: Clarence R. Haden & Margaret Collins
- Spouse: Essie L. Jones (m. 1935)
- Children: 1

Clarence Rupert Haden Jr. (May 30, 1910 – March 11, 2000) was fourth bishop of the Episcopal Diocese of Northern California, serving from 1958 to 1978.

== Biography ==
Haden was born in Fort Worth, Texas, on May 30, 1910, to Clarence Rupert Haden Sr. and Margaret Collins. He was educated at the public schools in Fort Worth, and then attended Baylor University from where he earned a Bachelor of Arts in 1931. He also studied at the Union Theological Seminary between 1932 and 1934, and then at the Seabury-Western Theological Seminary, graduating with a Bachelor of Sacred Theology in 1936, and awarded a Doctor of Divinity in 1952.

Haden was ordained deacon in April 1936 and priest in November 1936 by Bishop Harry Tunis Moore of Dallas. He married Essie Lucilla Jones on February 1, 1935, and together they had one daughter. He was in charge of St Barnabas' Church in Denton, Texas, and St Paul's Church in Gainesville, Texas, from 1936 until 1937. He then became rector of St John's Church in Corsicana, Texas, while in 1941 he became rector of St Matthew's Church in Houma, Louisiana. In 1943, he accepted the rectorship of St Paul's Church in New Orleans, and in 1945 he became rector of St Philip's Church in Durham, North Carolina. Between 1951 and 1953 he served as executive director of the Presiding Bishop's commission on laymen's work. He then served previously as dean of Grace and Holy Trinity Cathedral (Kansas City, Missouri) between 1953 and 1957.

In 1957 Haden was elected Coadjutor Bishop of Sacramento, and was consecrated on June 14, 1957, with Presiding Bishop Henry Knox Sherrill as chief consecrator in Trinity Cathedral. He succeeded as diocesan bishop on January 1, 1958, and remained in office until his retirement in 1978. On April 22, 1961, the name of the diocese was changed to the Diocese of Northern California.

He died on March 11, 2000, in Charleston, South Carolina.
