= Daniel Edwards (disambiguation) =

Daniel Edwards is an American contemporary artist.

Daniel, Dan, or Danny Edwards may also refer to:

- Daniel R. Edwards (1897–1967), United States Army Medal of Honor recipient
- Dan Edwards (1926–2001), American football player
- Dan Thomas Edwards (living), American bishop
- Danny Edwards (born 1951), American professional golfer
- Dan Edwards (rugby union) (born 2003), Welsh rugby player
