= Trinity Episcopal Cathedral (Sacramento, California) =

Trinity Cathedral
- Trinity Cathedral
- 38°34′14.58″N 121°28′20.54″W
- Location: 2620 Capitol Avenue; Sacramento, California
- Country: United States
- Denomination: Episcopal Church in the United States of America
- Website: www.trinitycathedral.org

History
- Founded: 1897
- Dedicated: October 23, 1955

Specifications
- Materials: Brick

Administration
- Diocese: Episcopal Diocese of Northern California

Clergy
- Bishop: The Rt. Rev. Megan M. Traquair
- Dean: The Very Rev. Matthew Woodward (Since August 2020)

The Trinity Episcopal Cathedral is a cathedral church in Sacramento, California, United States. It is the seat of the Episcopal Diocese of Northern California. The cathedral reported 1,903 members in 2015 and 1,249 members in 2023; no membership statistics were reported in 2024 parochial reports. Plate and pledge income for the congregation in 2024 was $1,133,486 with average Sunday attendance (ASA) of 264.

== History ==
The first Episcopal services were held in Sacramento in 1847 by the Rev. Flavel Scott Mines of Trinity Church, San Francisco. Grace Church was founded the following day. Trinity had its beginnings as St. Andrew's Mission in 1897 with the Rev. Alfred George as Missionary. From 1900 to 1903, it was reorganized as Trinity Church and a new church building was constructed. In 1910 Trinity was named the pro-cathedral by the Rt. Rev. William Hall Moreland. By 1925, the Pro-Cathedral was suggested to tourists to California.

The Very Rev. John R. Atwill was named the first dean. Some of the parishioners objected and petitioned that Trinity be maintained as a parish, but to no avail. Because of financial difficulties Trinity and St. Paul's Church were merged to become Christ Church Cathedral in 1934. Trinity became the Bishop's Chapel at this time and from 1941 to 1945 Cathedral House became a home for servicemen during World War II. Following the war Trinity became a parish again in 1946 and a pro-cathedral in 1948. Ground was broken for the present church building in September 1954. It was designed by Earl Barnett, an architect who traveled the world and studied different houses of worship to find the right inspiration.

The cornerstone was laid on May 30, 1955. The cathedral was dedicated on October 23 of the same year. From 1988 to 1991, the Trinity 2000 Building Program was undertaken and the Great Hall was built.

== 21st Century ==
In May 2001, then-Dean Donald G. Brown joined dozens of other clergy in a famous open letter against President George W. Bush's faith-based initiative.

Trinity Cathedral was in 2012 named by Peter Saucerman, a local architect, as one of the 10 most architecturally "noteworthy" churches in the city of Sacramento.

In 2014, the cathedral's Dean, the Rev. Brian Baker, lead the movement to include marriage equality in the Episcopal Church. Trinity Cathedral continues to be welcoming to LGBT people as of 2024.

In 2019, Trinity Cathedral started a tradition of two days of meal giveaways to unhoused persons for Thanksgiving.

Trinity Cathedral was the center point for Sacramento clergy to welcome asylum seekers in 2023. In retaliation, Florida's governor Ron DeSantis ordered a plane to fly and then bus 36 migrants, to dumped them off in front of the nearby Roman Cathedral's offices; the Episcopal Cathedral assisted with humanitarian relief in the form of clothing.

Vox Musica performed at Trinity Cathedral in Advent 2023.

== See also ==
- List of the Episcopal cathedrals of the United States
- List of cathedrals in the United States
- St. John's Episcopal Church (Roseville, California)
- Trinity Episcopal Church (Folsom, California)
