= Edward McNair =

American prelate

The Right Reverend Edward McNair
- Suffragan Bishop of Northern California
- Church: Episcopal Church
- Diocese: Northern California
- Elected: June 21, 1967
- In office: 1967–1973

Orders
- Ordination: July 1940 (deacon); July 1941 (priest) by W. Bertrand Stevens
- Consecration: November 30, 1967 by John E. Hines

Personal details
- Born: June 14, 1913 San Bernardino, California, United States
- Died: April 20, 1986 (aged 72)
- Denomination: Anglican
- Parents: Walter McNair & Florence Mead

Edward C. McNair (June 14, 1913 – April 20, 1986) was an American prelate of the Episcopal Church who served as Suffragan bishop of Northern California from 1967 to 1972.

== Early life and education ==
McNair was born on June 14, 1913 in San Bernardino, California to Walter McNair and Florence Mead. He was educated at the public schools in Colton, California and later studied at the Occidental College from where he graduated with a Bachelor of Arts in 1935, and a Master of Theology from the University of Southern California in 1940. He also earned a Bachelor of Divinity from the Church Divinity School of the Pacific in 1942 and awarded a Doctor of Divinity in 1964. He married Ann Heathcote Stevens on June 19, 1937 and together had five children.

== Ordained Ministry ==
McNair was ordained deacon in July 1940 and priest in July 1941 by Bishop W. Bertrand Stevens of Los Angeles. He initially served as vicar at St Peter's Church in Del Mar, California in the South Coast Missions, after which he was appointed chaplain in the US Navy. Later he was the first vicar and then rector of the Church of St Michael and All Angels in Studio City, California until 1959, when he became rector of St John's Church in Marysville, California. In 1965 he became rector of the Church of the Incarnation in Santa Rosa, California where he remained until his election in 1967.

== Bishop ==
On June 21, 1967, McNair was elected Suffragan Bishop of Northern California on the sixth ballot. He was then consecrated on November 30, 1967 in Trinity Cathedral by Presiding Bishop John E. Hines. He remained in office until his retirement on June 1, 1973. He died on April 20, 1986 after a long illness.
