= Benjamin Brewster (bishop) =

American Episcopal bishop (1860–1941)

The Right Reverend Benjamin Brewster
- Bishop of Maine
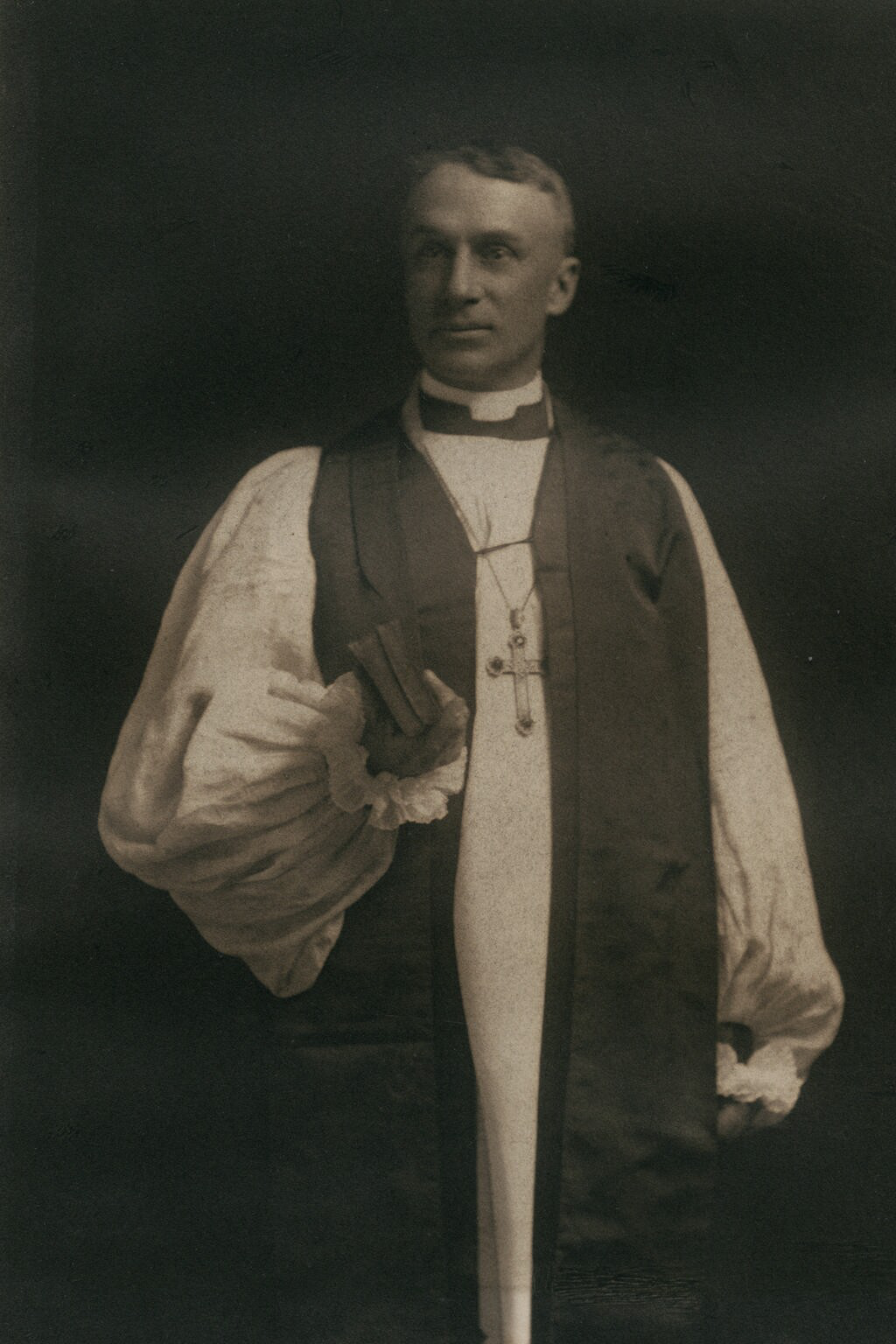
- Brewster, 1895–1906
- Church: Episcopal Church
- Diocese: Maine
- Elected: June 7, 1916
- In office: 1916–1940
- Predecessor: Robert Codman
- Successor: Oliver Leland Loring
- Previous post: Bishop of Western Colorado (1909–1916)

Orders
- Ordination: 1887
- Consecration: June 17, 1909 by Daniel S. Tuttle

Personal details
- Born: November 25, 1860 New Haven, Connecticut, US
- Died: February 2, 1941 (aged 80) Portland, Maine, US
- Denomination: Anglican
- Spouse: Stella Yates (1891–1929); Mary Phillips (1937–1941)
- Education: Yale University

Benjamin Brewster (November 25, 1860 – February 2, 1941) was the Episcopal bishop of Maine and Missionary Bishop of Western Colorado.

== Early life ==
Coat of arms of William Brewster

He was born in New Haven, Connecticut, the son of the Rev. Joseph Brewster and Sarah Jane Bunce. He was a direct descendant of both Love Brewster, a passenger with his father, mother and brother, Wrestling, aboard the Mayflower and a founder of the town of Bridgewater, Massachusetts; and of Elder William Brewster, the Pilgrim colonist leader and spiritual elder of the Plymouth Colony, and passenger aboard the Mayflower and one of the signers of the Mayflower Compact.

His brother was the Right Rev. Dr. Chauncey Bunce Brewster, the fifth American Episcopal bishop of the Episcopal Diocese of Connecticut.

== Education ==
After preparation in the Hopkins Grammar School, he graduated with a B.A. in 1882 from Yale University, where he was a member of Skull and Bones, and then he received his B.D. in 1886 from the General Theological Seminary, New York City. Meanwhile, he taught school in Cleveland, Ohio, during 1882–1883.

== Ordination ==
He was ordained deacon in the Episcopal Church in 1886 and priest in 1887. His first charge was as assistant to Henry Yates Satterlee (his first wife's first cousin) at Calvary Church, New York City, from 1886 to 1891, and he also served as Vicar of Calvary Church during 1887–1891. In the next four years he was pastor at that Church of the Holy Communion, South Orange, New Jersey, and during 1895–1906 was pastor at Grace Church, Colorado Springs, Colorado. In addition he was a member of the standing committee of the Diocese of Colorado from 1897 to 1906 and examining chaplain from 1900 to 1906. During the next three years he was Dean of St. Mark's Cathedral, Salt Lake City, Utah, and president of the council of advice for the District of Salt Lake.

== Consecration ==
On June 17, 1909, he was consecrated Missionary Bishop of Western Colorado. He was translated to be Bishop of the Diocese of Maine on June 7, 1916. Benjamin Brewster was the 242nd bishop consecrated in the Episcopal Church. Brewster announced in May 1940, that he would retire at the end of the year as Bishop because of his age, but his successor had not been named and he was serving in the capacity of Bishop emeritus at the time of his death.

The church in Maine had a steady growth during his bishopric and reached into more communities. Prominent in church affairs outside his diocese, Brewster served as president of the Synod of New England during 1933–1939 and as vice-president of the Church League for Industrial Democracy from 1916 to 1941. He was chairman of the joint committee of Bishops and clerical and lay deputies on nominations at the General Convention of the Protestant Episcopal Church, Cincinnati, Ohio, in 1937, and was a commissioner of the World Council of Churches.

In his first year in Maine he was a delegate to the neutral conference committee that met with Woodrow Wilson to discuss the possibility of calling a conference of neutral nations to halt World War I. In 1919, his resolution in favor of clemency for "political prisoners" including conscientious objectors, was adopted by the House of Bishops at the General Convention, but defeated almost unanimously in the House of Deputies. In 1936 he presented a resolution to the House of Bishops of the Protestant Episcopal Church requesting Franklin D. Roosevelt to call an international conference of nations which had signed the Kellogg–Briand Pact. In 1921 and again in 1930 he attended the Lambeth Conference, London, England. He was known as a liberal in economics and politics as well as religion. In 1934 he worked in favor of a measure endorsing efforts to obtain for physicians and medical clinics the legal right to disseminate birth control information and the measure passed the House of Bishops by a vote of 44 to 38.

== Personal life ==
Brewster married on June 10, 1891, in New York City, as his first wife Stella Yates (November 23, 1866 – February 2, 1929), the daughter of Brigadier-General Charles Yates and Josephine Bosworth the daughter of New York Supreme Court Chief Justice Joseph Sollace Bosworth and Frances Pumpelly. Frances was the first cousin of Raphael Pumpelly, an American geologist and explorer. Benjamin and Stella had five children together.

He married on August 25, 1937, in Portland, Maine, as his second wife Mary Phillips (February 11, 1884 – 1941), widow of George Guillifer Hay, and daughter of Brigadier General Charles L. Phillips, by whom he had no children. Benjamin Brewster died in Portland, Maine on February 2, 1941.

== Additional reading ==
- Hamilton College. Obituary: New York Supreme Court Chief Justice Joseph Sollace Bosworth; New York: Hamilton literary magazine, Volume 19 1885.
- Jones, Emma C. Brewster. The Brewster Genealogy, 1566-1907: a Record of the Descendants of William Brewster of the "Mayflower," ruling elder of the Pilgrim church which founded Plymouth Colony in 1620. New York: Grafton Press. 1908
- Osborn, Norris Galpin. Men of mark in Connecticut: ideals of American life told in biographies and autobiographies of eminent living Americans, Volume 4; New York: W.R. Goodspeed, 1908.
- Wright, R.W.Biographical record: Yale University. Class of 1842 R.W. Wright, compiler, Published by Tuttle, Morehouse & Taylor, Printers, 1878
- The National Cyclopædia of American Biography, Volume 44. New York: James T. White & Company (1962) 478–479.
