= Charles Yate =

Charles Yate is the name of:

- Sir Charles Yate, 1st Baronet (1849–1940), British administrator in India and politician
- Charles Allix Lavington Yate (1872–1914), British First World War recipient of the Victoria Cross

== See also ==
- Charles Yates (died 1870), brigadier-general during the American Civil War
