= Wesley Frensdorff =

Bishop of Nevada (1926–1988)

The Right Reverend Wesley Frensdorff
- Bishop of Nevada
- Church: Episcopal Church
- Diocese: Nevada
- Elected: September 24, 1971
- In office: 1972–1985
- Predecessor: William Godsell Wright
- Successor: Stewart Clark Zabriskie

Orders
- Ordination: November 3, 1951 by William F. Lewis
- Consecration: March 4, 1972 by John E. Hines

Personal details
- Born: July 26, 1926 Hanover, Weimar Republic
- Died: May 17, 1988 (aged 61) Grand Canyon National Park, Arizona, US
- Denomination: Anglican
- Parents: Rudolph August Frensdorff & Erma Margarete Asch
- Spouse: Dolores Stoker
- Children: 5

Wesley "Wes" Frensdorff (July 22, 1926 – May 17, 1988) was the bishop of the Episcopal Diocese of Nevada from 1972 to 1985.

== Early life and education ==
Frensdorff was born on July 22, 1926, in Hanover, Weimar Republic, the son of Rudolph August Frensdorff and Erma Margarete Asch. He came to the United States in 1940 as a 14-year-old and completed high school in Elmhurst, New York. He was a graduate of Columbia University with a Bachelor of Arts in 1948 and from the General Theological Seminary with a Bachelor of Sacred Theology in 1951.

== Ordination ==
Frensdorff was ordained deacon on March 31, 1951, by Bishop James P. deWolfe of Long Island, and priest on November 3, 1951, by Bishop William F. Lewis of Nevada. Between 1951 and 1954, he served as vicar of St Mary's Church in Winnemucca, Nevada, St Andrew's Church in Battle Mountain, Nevada, and St Anne's Church in McDermitt, Nevada. Later he became rector of St Paul's Church in Elko, Nevada. In 1959 he became rector of St Barnabas and St Luke's Church in Wells, Nevada and of St Martin's Church in the Upper Skagit Valley and Community Church in Newhalem, Washington, all posts held till 1962. He became Dean of St Mark's Cathedral in Salt Lake City in 1962 and remained there till 1972. He also served as Director of the North Pacific and Western parish training program of the Episcopal Church between 1959 and 1964.

== Bishop ==
On September 24, 1971, he was elected Bishop of Nevada. He was consecrated on March 4, 1972, by Presiding Bishop John E. Hines. He remained in Nevada till 1985 when he became assistant bishop in Arizona. From 1983 to 1985 he also served as interim bishop of the Navajoland Area Mission.

== Death ==
Frensdorff died in a private plane crash near the north rim of the Grand Canyon on May 17, 1988.

== Personal life ==
Frensdorff married Dolores Stoker in 1953 with whom he had 5 children.
