= Charles L. Phillips =

U.S. Army brigadier general (1856–1937)

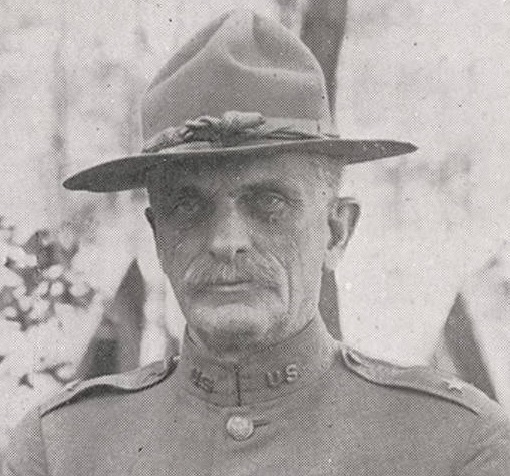
- From 1918's Souvenir of Camp Wadsworth, Spartanburg, South Carolina
- Born: October 16, 1856; Olney, Illinois, U.S.
- Died: March 3, 1937 (aged 80); El Centro, California, U.S.
- Burial place: Fort Rosecrans National Cemetery
- Education: Colby College (B.A., 1878); United States Military Academy
- Spouse(s): Harriet Wallace Foster (m. 1881–1888) Katherine Tiernon (m. 1890–1926)
- Children: 2
- Relatives: Benjamin Brewster (son in law)
- Military career
- Service: United States Army
- Service years: 1881–1920
- Rank: Brigadier General
- Service number: 0–13458
- Units: U.S. Army Field Artillery Branch; U.S. Army Coast Artillery Corps
- Commands: Coburn Cadets, University of Maine; Battery A, 4th Field Artillery Regiment; Fort Dade; Key West Barracks and Coast Artillery District of Key West; Fort McKinley; Fort Schuyler; Fort Totten and Eastern Coast Artillery District of New York; Fort Screven, Georgia and Coast Defenses of Savannah; Coast Defenses of San Francisco; Coast Defenses of Manila Bay and Subic Bay; Coast Defenses of Narragansett Bay; North Atlantic Coast Artillery District; 51st Artillery Brigade, 26th Division; 52nd Artillery Brigade, 27th Division; 27th Division; Coast Defenses of Puget Sound
- Wars: Spanish–American War; World War I

Charles L. Phillips (October 16, 1856 – March 3, 1937) was a career officer in the United States Army. A veteran of the Spanish–American War and World War I, he was a Field Artillery specialist who joined the Coast Artillery Corps when it was created as a separate branch. Phillips served from 1881 to 1920 and attained the rank of brigadier general.

Phillips was a native of Gardner, Illinois, and was raised and educated in Waterville, Maine. He attended Colby College from 1874 to 1877, when he began attendance at the United States Military Academy (West Point). He graduated in 1881 and received his commission as a second lieutenant, then served at posts in the western United States, including Fort Canby, Washington and Fort Snelling, Minnesota. When the Coast Artillery Corps was separated from the Field Artillery Branch, Phillips transferred to the Coast Artillery. He commanded Coast Artillery posts on both the Atlantic and Pacific coasts of the United States, as well as posts in the Philippines.

At the start of World War I, Phillips commanded the 51st Field Artillery Brigade, a unit of the 26th Division, and the 52nd Field Artillery Brigade, a subordinate command of the 27th Division. He also served as acting commander of the 27th Division on several occasions. In March 1918, he reverted from his temporary rank of brigadier general to his permanent rank of colonel and commanded the Coast Defenses of Puget Sound until retiring in 1920. Legislation passed in 1930 allowed the general officers of World War I to retire at their highest rank, and Phillips was promoted to brigadier general on the retired list.

In retirement, Phillips was a resident of El Centro, California. He died in El Centro on March 3, 1937, and was buried at Fort Rosecrans National Cemetery.

== Early life ==
Charles Leonard Phillips was born in Gardner, Illinois on October 16, 1856, the son of Jairus P. Phillips and Ellen M. (Webster) Phillips. He was raised and educated in Waterville, Maine, and graduated from Waterville Classical Institute in 1874. He attended Colby College from 1874 to 1877, and was a member of the Delta Kappa Epsilon fraternity.

In 1877, Phillips performed well on the competitive examination for appointment to the United States Military Academy that was given by U.S. Representative Stephen Lindsey; he received the appointment and graduated in 1881 ranked 13th of 53. The top two or three West Point graduates usually chose to serve in the Corps of Engineers; Phillips's ranking enabled him to obtain assignment to the second choice of most top students, the Field Artillery.

== Start of career ==
Phillips's first assignment was with the 4th Field Artillery Regiment at Fort Canby, Washington, where he remained until October 1881, when he was posted to Fort Warren, Massachusetts. In September 1882, Phillips was posted to Fort Snelling, Minnesota. In June 1885, he was assigned as professor of military science and tactics at the University of Maine, where he remained until July 1888. While in this posting, he commanded the college's state militia unit, the Coburn Guards. He was promoted to first lieutenant in December 1887. In addition, in 1888, he received his B.A. degree from Colby College as in course, making him a graduate of the class of 1878. Also in 1888, Phillips received the honorary degree of C.E. from the University of Maine. In addition to leading the Coburn Cadets, Phillips also worked with several other militia units to improve their training and readiness, including the Hamlin Guards of Bangor and Frye Light Guards of Lewiston. When he left the University of Maine, the Lewiston Guards showed their appreciation for Phillips's efforts by presenting him a dress sword and belt.

From September 1888 to November 1890, Phillips was a student at the Field Artillery School. From November 1890 to July 1892, he commanded Battery A, 4th Field Artillery, first at Fort Barrancas, Florida, then at Fort McPherson, Georgia. From July 1892 to July 1896, he was professor of military science and tactics at Cornell College, in Mount Vernon, Iowa. From July 1896 to May 1899, he served as adjutant of the post at Fort Monroe, Virginia, and secretary of the Field Artillery School. During the Spanish–American War, his administrative duties included serving as recorder of the boards that made promotion recommendations for Artillery officers during the army's wartime expansion. He was promoted to captain in March 1899.

Phillips performed garrison staff duty at Fort Monroe until June 1900, when he was assigned to Fort Hancock, New Jersey. When the Coast Artillery was created as a separate branch in 1901, Phillips was assigned to the new organization. As a Coast Artillery expert, he was commended throughout the rest of his career for developing and improving Coast Artillery firing procedures and fire control methods. From August 1903 to August 1905, he commanded the post at Fort Dade, Florida. Phillips was promoted to major in June 1905.

== Continued career ==
Phillips commanded Key West Barracks and of the Coast Artillery District of Key West from August 1905 to August 1906. He performed garrison duty at Fort McKinley, Maine from August 1906 to June 1907. He assumed command at Fort McKinley in June 1907 and remained in this position until October 1909. Phillips was promoted to lieutenant colonel in July 1908. From October 1909 to October 1910, he commanded the post at Fort Schuyler, New York.

From October 1910 to February 1911, Phillips commanded Fort Totten and the Eastern Coast Artillery District of New York. From February 1911 to April 1913, he commanded Fort Screven, Georgia and the Coast Defenses of Savannah. He was promoted to colonel in March 1911. From April to October 1913 Phillips commanded the Coast Defenses of San Francisco. From October 1913 to February 1917, he commanded the Coast Defenses of Manila Bay and Subic Bay in the Philippines. After returning to the United States, he was assigned to Fort Adams, Rhode Island, where he commanded the Coast Defenses of Narragansett Bay until May 1917, and the North Atlantic Coast Artillery District until August 1917.

== Later career ==
With the army expanding for World War I, Phillips was promoted to temporary brigadier general in August 1917. He commanded the 51st Artillery Brigade, a unit of the 26th Division during its initial organization and training in Boston. He was then posted to Camp Wadsworth, South Carolina and named to command the 27th Division's 52nd Artillery Brigade, which he led until March 1918. While in command of this brigade, Phillips also acted as commander of the 27th Division on several occasions.

In March 1918, Phillips was found physically unfit for overseas service and reverted to his permanent rank of colonel. He was then assigned to command the Coast Defenses of Puget Sound, Washington. He requested retirement in June 1920, a few months before reaching the mandatory retirement age of 64.

== Retirement and death ==
In 1920, Colby College awarded Phillips the honorary degree of LL.D. In retirement, he resided with his daughter Cali in El Centro, California. Among his activities were leadership roles with the Boy Scouts of America, including vice president of the Imperial–Yuma Council and chairman of the El Centro District. Legislation passed in 1930 permitted World War I's general officers to retire at their highest rank, and Phillips was promoted to brigadier general on the retired list. Phillips died in El Centro on March 3, 1937. He was buried at Fort Rosecrans National Cemetery.

== Family ==
In 1881, Phillips married Harriet Wallace Foster. She died in 1888, and in 1890, he married Katherine Tiernon (d. 1926), the daughter of Brigadier General John L. Tiernon. With his first wife, Phillips was the father of daughter Mary, who was married first to George G. Hay (d. 1920), then to Benjamin Brewster. With his second wife, Phillips was the father of daughter Cali, who was married to Major Ralph C. Harrison.
