= Barry L. Beisner =

American bishop (born 1951)

The Right Reverend Barry L. Beisner
- Provisional Bishop of Navajoland; VII Bishop of Northern California
- Church: Episcopal Church
- Diocese: Northern California
- Elected: May 6, 2006
- In office: 2007–2019
- Predecessor: Jerry Lamb
- Successor: Megan Traquair
- Previous post: Coadjutor Bishop of Northern California (2006)

Orders
- Ordination: June 24, 1978 (deacon); May 19, 1979 (priest) by C. Kilmer Myers
- Consecration: September 30, 2006 by Harry Brown Bainbridge III

Personal details
- Born: June 5, 1951 (age 75) Dayton, Ohio, United States
- Denomination: Anglican
- Spouse: L. Ann Hallisey (m. 1998)
- Children: 6

Barry Leigh Beisner (born June 5, 1951) is a retired American bishop. He was the seventh bishop of the Episcopal Diocese of Northern California from 2007 to 2019. He has been serving as the bishop provisional of the Missionary Diocese of Navajoland since 2023.

== Biography ==
Beisner was born in Dayton, Ohio on June 5, 1951. He studied at the University of California, Berkeley and graduated with a Bachelor of Arts in History in 1973. He also graduated with a Master of Divinity from the Church Divinity School of the Pacific in 1978 and a Master of Sacred Theology from the General Theological Seminary in 1994. The latter awarded him a Doctor of Divinity in 2007.

Beisner was ordained to the diaconate on June 24, 1978, and to the priesthood on May 19, 1979. He served as assistant at St Stephen's Church in San Luis Obispo, California from 1978 to 1979 and then as vicar of St Paul's Church in Cambria, California and chaplain at California Polytechnic State University, San Luis Obispo between 1978 and 1980. In 1980 he became associate rector of St Mark's Church in Upper Arlington, Ohio while in 1983 he returned to California to become rector of the Church of the Incarnation in San Francisco. Between 1989 and 2002 he was rector of St Martin's Church in Davis, California during which time he helped found Davis Community Meals, was a Field Education Supervisor and Lecturer in Pastoral and Practical Theology at the Church Divinity School of the Pacific, a Chaplain for the Clergy Leadership Project, and an Army Reserve Chaplain. In 2002 he was appointed Canon to the Ordinary in the Diocese of Northern California.

On May 6, 2006, he was elected Coadjutor Bishop of Northern California and was consecrated on September 30, 2006. He succeeded as diocesan bishop on January 1, 2007. He announced his retirement at the diocesan convention of the Episcopal Diocese of Northern California on in November 2017. He was succeeded by the Rt. Rev. Megan M. Traquair upon her consecration on June 29, 2019.

== See also ==
- List of Episcopal bishops of the United States
- Historical list of the Episcopal bishops of the United States
