= John Lester Thompson =

1926–2004 American prelate of the Episcopal Church

The Right Reverend John Lester Thompson
- Bishop of Northern California
- Church: Episcopal Church
- Diocese: Northern California
- Elected: April 1978
- In office: 1978–1991
- Predecessor: Clarence Haden
- Successor: Jerry Lamb
- Previous post: Coadjutor Bishop of Northern California (1978)

Orders
- Ordination: June 1951 (deacon); December 1951 (priest)
- Consecration: September 21, 1978 by John Allin

Personal details
- Born: May 11, 1926 Youngstown, Ohio, United States
- Died: May 2, 2004 (aged 77) Medford, Oregon, United States
- Denomination: Anglican
- Spouse: Shirley A. Scott (m. 1951)
- Children: 2

John Lester Thompson III (May 11, 1926 – May 2, 2004) was an American prelate of the Episcopal Church who served as Bishop of Northern California from 1978 until 1991.

== Biography ==
Thompson was born on May 11, 1926 in Youngstown, Ohio. During WWII he enlisted in the Navy and served in the Pacific Theater. He then studied at Youngstown College, and then at the Episcopal Theological School, graduating in 1951.

Thompson was ordained a deacon in June 1951 and priest in December 1951. He initially served as a curate at St Mark's Church in Toledo, Ohio. He married Shirley A. Scott in August 1951 and together had two children. In 1953 he became rector of Trinity Church in Ashland, Oregon. During that time, he was also a board member of the Oregon Shakespeare Festival and as its president for one year. In 1960 he became rector of Christ Church in Eureka, California, where he remained until 1978.

In April 1978, Thompson was elected Coadjutor Bishop of Northern California on the 22nd ballot. He was consecrated on September 21, 1978 in the Cathedral of the Blessed Sacrament, Sacramento, California by Presiding Bishop John Allin, and subsequently succeeded as diocesan upon Bishop Haden's retirement that same month. He remained in office until his retirement in 1991.

Thompson died at home in Medford, Oregon, on May 2, 2004.
