= Trinity Episcopal Church (Folsom, California) =

- 38°40′33″N 121°10′38″W
- Location: Folsom, CA, USA
- Denomination: Episcopal Church in the United States of America
- Churchmanship: Liberal Anglo-Catholicism
- Website: Trinity Episcopal Church

History
- Status: active

Architecture
- Style: Carpenter Gothic
- Groundbreaking: 1862
- Completed: 1862

Administration
- Diocese: Episcopal Diocese of Northern California

Trinity Episcopal Church is an Episcopal church located in Folsom, California, United States. Located on a small campus containing a historic Carpenter Gothic church building, it is one of the largest parishes in the Episcopal Diocese of Northern California. The parish had an average Sunday attendance of 215 in 2023, and has four priests as of December 2024.

The congregation has a socially liberal orientation, describing itself as being inclusive of "all genders and sexual orientations", that "that there is grace after divorce", and that "issues such as birth control are matters of personal informed conscience". The parish emphasizes traditional Anglican liturgy, music, and worship.

== Parish history ==
The church is one of the earliest congregations in Folsom, and among the oldest in Northern California. As of 2020, it is the oldest congregation still offering weekly services in Folsom. The original congregation organized in 1856, and the church building was constructed in 1862. At times a full parish and at times a mission church, the current parish dates from 1979.

Church services were originally held at a local workshop in 1856, and the original parish was admitted to the Episcopal Diocese of California by William Ingraham Kip around 1857. The environs were noted by a supply priest in 1903 as "staggering under the curse of many saloons and iniquitous dens". The church had major expansions and renovations in 1972, 1994, and 2019.

== Leadership ==
The current rector is the Reverend Bret Hays.

== See also ==
- Episcopal Diocese of Northern California
