= George Coolidge Hunting =

Missionary bishop of the Episcopal Diocese of Nevada 1914 to 1924

The Right Reverend George Coolidge Hunting D.D.
- Missionary Bishop of Nevada
- Church: Episcopal Church
- Diocese: Nevada
- Elected: 1914
- In office: 1914–1924
- Predecessor: Henry Douglas Robinson
- Successor: Thomas Jenkins

Orders
- Ordination: April 14, 1897
- Consecration: December 16, 1914 by Daniel S. Tuttle

Personal details
- Born: October 22, 1871 West Milwaukee, Wisconsin, United States
- Died: February 6, 1924 (aged 52) Reno, Nevada, United States
- Buried: Silver Terrace Cemetery, Virginia City, Nevada
- Denomination: Anglican
- Spouse: Mary Grace Hunting (m. 1894)

George Coolidge Hunting (October 22, 1871 – February 6, 1924) was missionary bishop of the Episcopal Diocese of Nevada 1914 to 1924.

== Early life and education ==
Hunting was born on October 22, 1871, in West Milwaukee, Wisconsin, son of George Coolidge Hunting and Mary Ann Ladd. He was a descendant of John Hunting an early settler. He studied at the Virginia Theological Seminary, graduating in 1894. The seminary also awarded him with a Doctor of Divinity in 1914.

== Ordained Ministry ==
Hunting was ordained deacon on July 29, 1894 in St Mark's Cathedral, and priest on April 14, 1897 in St Paul's Church. He was in charge of St Paul's Church in Virginia City, Nevada from 1894 until 1898 and then served as a missionary in Nevada and Utah. In 1899 he became rector of St Paul's Church in Evanston, Wyoming, while in 1902 he became chaplain at St Mark's Hospital in Salt Lake City where he remained until 1907. He then undertook missionary work in Ely, Nevada between 1907 and 1912 before becoming department secretary of the Province 8 of the Episcopal Church, serving from 1912 until 1915.

== Episcopacy ==
Hunting was elected Missionary Bishop of Nevada in 1914. He was consecrated in St Mark's Cathedral, Salt Lake City on December 16, 1914 by Presiding Bishop Daniel S. Tuttle. During his episcopacy he revived a number of churches in the mining towns of Eureka, Nevada, Virginia City, Nevada, and Austin, Nevada. He acquired property for missions in promising agricultural areas.

== Personal life ==
He married Mary Grace Pullman on October 15, 1894. He was also cousin of President Calvin Coolidge.

== Death ==
Hunting succumbed to pneumonia and died on February 6, 1924.
