= Dan Thomas Edwards =

American bishop

The Right Reverend Dan Thomas Edwards
- Bishop of Nevada
- Church: Episcopal Church
- Diocese: Nevada
- Elected: October 12, 2007
- In office: 2007-2018
- Predecessor: Katharine Jefferts Schori
- Successor: Elizabeth Bonforte Gardner

Orders
- Ordination: 1991
- Consecration: January 5, 2008 by Katharine Jefferts Schori

Personal details
- Denomination: Anglican
- Spouse: Linda Edwards
- Children: 2

Dan Thomas Edwards is a retired diocesan bishop of the Episcopal Diocese of Nevada.

== Biography ==
Edwards grew up in Texas and graduated with a Doctor of Law from the University of Texas at Austin in 1975. He then practiced law in Colorado and Idaho. He served as regional director of a Migrant Law program and later became statewide director of a Native American Law program. He also studied at the General Theological Seminary graduating with a Master of Divinity in 1991. He was ordained deacon in 1990 and priest in 1991. His first post after ordination was as curate at Christ Church in Williamsport, Pennsylvania, where he served from 1990 until 1994. Edwards also served as rector of St Francis' Church in Macon, Georgia, between 1994 and 2007 and dean of the region's convocation of congregations.

Edwards was elected on October 12, 2007, and was consecrated bishop on January 5, 2008, with his predecessor the Presiding Bishop Katharine Jefferts Schori as chief consecrator.

== See also ==
- List of Episcopal bishops of the United States
- Historical list of the Episcopal bishops of the United States
