= Archie W. N. Porter =

Third bishop of the Diocese of Northern California

The Right Reverend Archie W. N. Porter
- Bishop of Sacramento
- Church: Episcopal Church
- Diocese: Sacramento
- Elected: 1933
- In office: 1933–1957
- Predecessor: William Hall Moreland
- Successor: Clarence Haden

Orders
- Ordination: May 1911 (deacon); December 1911 (priest) by Joseph Horsfall Johnson
- Consecration: May 23, 1933 by William Hall Moreland

Personal details
- Born: December 18, 1885 Ballari, India
- Died: March 14, 1963 (aged 77) Palo Alto, California, United States
- Denomination: Anglican
- Parents: John Porter & Martha Hannah Starling
- Spouse: Dorathe H. Hallowell (m. 1912)
- Children: 5

Archie William Noel Porter (December 18, 1885 – March 14, 1963) was the third bishop of the Diocese of Northern California in The Episcopal Church from 1933 to 1957, having previously served as archdeacon and bishop coadjutor.

== Biography ==
Porter was born n December 18, 1885, in Ballari, India, the son of John Porter and Martha Hannah Starling. He was educated at the Walthamstow Technical Institute in England and after moving to the United States in 1902, he studied at the University of Southern California from where he graduated with a Bachelor of Arts in 1908 and a Master of Arts in 1915. He also studied at the General Theological Seminary, graduating with a Bachelor of Divinity in 1914. He was awarded a Doctor of Divinity from the Church Divinity School of the Pacific in 1933. He married Dorathe H. Hallowell on June 12, 1912, in San Francisco, California and together had 4 sons and 1 daughter.

Porter was ordained deacon and priest in 1911 and served as rector of St James' Church in Los Angeles from 1911 to 1917. He then transferred to San Jose, California, to serve as rector of Trinity Church, while in 1925 he became Archdeacon of the Diocese of Sacramento.

In 1933 he was elected Coadjutor Bishop of Sacramento and was consecrated on May 23, 1933, by Bishop William Hall Moreland of Sacramento. He succeeded as diocesan bishop later that year and remained in office until his retirement on December 31, 1957.
