= Jerry Lamb (bishop) =

American Episcopalian bishop (1940–2026)

The Right Reverend Jerry Lamb
- Bishop of Northern California
- Church: Episcopal Church
- Diocese: Northern California
- Elected: 1991
- In office: 1992–2006
- Predecessor: John Lester Thompson
- Successor: Barry L. Beisner
- Other post: Provisional Bishop of San Joaquin (2008–2011)
- Previous post: Coadjutor Bishop of Northern California (1991)

Orders
- Ordination: August 15, 1977 (priest)
- Consecration: June 9, 1991 by Edmond L. Browning

Personal details
- Born: September 4, 1940 Denver, Colorado, U.S.
- Died: July 26, 2026 (aged 85)
- Denomination: Anglican (prev. Roman Catholic)

Jerry Alban Lamb (September 4, 1940 – July 26, 2026) was an American Episcopalian bishop. He was the sixth bishop of the Episcopal Diocese of Northern California.

== Background ==
Lamb was born in Denver, Colorado. He attended the Roman Catholic St. Thomas Seminary in Denver, where he received a Bachelor of Arts in Philosophy in 1964 and a Master of Arts (M.A.) in Theology in 1966. In 1973 he received an M.A. in counseling from the University of Oregon. Lamb was received into the Episcopal Church and ordained to the diaconate in March 1977. On August 15, 1977, he was ordained to the priesthood in the Episcopal Diocese of Oregon.

He was elected Bishop Coadjutor of Northern California in 1991 and was consecrated on June 9 of that year. On January 1, 1992, he became the diocesan bishop. Also in 1992 he was awarded an honorary Doctor of Divinity degree from The Church Divinity School of the Pacific. He is the 868th bishop consecrated into the historical episcopate of the Episcopal Church.

Lamb retired at the end of 2006 and was succeeded by Barry L. Beisner. He was then appointed assisting bishop of Nevada after the election of Bishop Katharine Jefferts Schori as presiding bishop.

In March 2008, Lamb was appointed to administer the Episcopal Diocese of San Joaquin in central California after Bishop John-David Schofield and at least 40 parishes left the Episcopal Church for the Anglican Province of the Southern Cone, a province known as the Anglican Church of South America since 2014. About seven congregations are still part of the Episcopal Church.

He was a proponent of communion without baptism.

Lamb died on July 26, 2026, at the age of 85.
