= Elizabeth Bonforte Gardner =

Episcopal bishop

The Right Reverend Elizabeth Bonforte Gardner
- Bishop of Nevada
- Church: Episcopal Church
- Diocese: Nevada
- Elected: October 8, 2021
- In office: 2022–present
- Predecessor: Dan Thomas Edwards

Orders
- Ordination: January 26, 2013 (deacon); July 27, 2013 (priest) by Mariann Budde
- Consecration: March 5, 2022 by Michael Curry

Personal details
- Born: September 10, 1965 (age 60) Pueblo, Colorado, United States
- Denomination: Anglican

Elizabeth Bonforte Gardner (born September 10, 1965) is the current Episcopal Bishop of the Diocese of Nevada. Previously a priest and rector in the Episcopal Dioceses of Virginia, she is the 1,142nd bishop of the Episcopal Church and the 11th bishop elected to the Dioceses of Nevada

== Early life and education ==
Elizabeth was born in Pueblo, Colorado. She received a Bachelor of Arts in Political Science with an emphasis in Public Policy at the University of California, Santa Barbara. After moving to Washington D.C., she worked for Nordstrom as a buyer, for Rep. Barbara Vucanovitch, RNV as a legislative assistant, and started her own successful consulting firm before beginning ordained ministry. She graduated cum laude with a Master of Divinity from Virginia Theological Seminary in 2013.

== Ordained Ministry ==
During her education, Elizabeth served as Seminarian to the Washington National Cathedral. She was assistant rector at St. John's Episcopal Church of McLean, and then rector at Epiphany Episcopal in Washington D.C. She was then hired by the Canon for Programs to work on a Creation Care curriculum as the Interim Missioner for Young Adults and College Chaplains for the Dioceses of Washington D.C. From there she was assistant rector at Christ Church Georgetown, and rector at St. Mark's Episcopal. During her rectorship at St. Marks, the COVID-19 pandemic hit, and she created Potomac Episcopal, a union of four local churches to combine resources and viewership. It was from there she was elected Bishop of Nevada.

== Bishop ==
The Rt. Rev. Elizabeth Bonforte Gardner was elected as the eleventh bishop of the Episcopal Diocese of Nevada on Oct. 8, 2021. She was ordained and consecrated as the 11th bishop of Nevada on March 5 at Christ Episcopal Church in Las Vegas.

March 5 was proclaimed Bishop Elizabeth Gardner Day by Las Vegas Mayor Carolyn Goodman.
