= Edward J. Knight =

Edward Jennings Knight (November 17, 1864 - November 15, 1908) was bishop of the Episcopal Diocese of Western Colorado. An alumnus of Columbia University and the General Theological Seminary, he was consecrated on December 19, 1907.
