= William Hall Moreland =

The Right Reverend William Hall Moreland
- Bishop of Sacramento
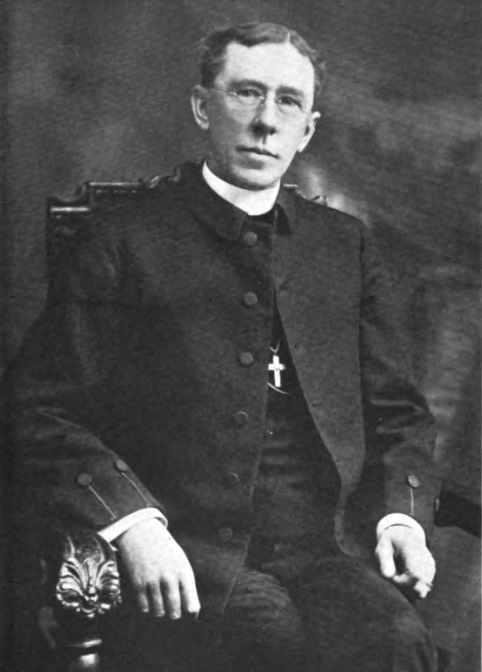
- Church: Episcopal Church
- Diocese: Sacramento
- Elected: 1898
- In office: 1899-1933
- Predecessor: John Henry Ducachet Wingfield
- Successor: Archie W. N. Porter

Orders
- Ordination: August 23, 1885 by William B. W. Howe
- Consecration: January 25, 1899 by William Ford Nichols

Personal details
- Born: April 9, 1861 Charleston, South Carolina, United States
- Died: October 27, 1946 (aged 85) Los Angeles, California, United States
- Buried: Cypress Lawn Memorial Park
- Denomination: Anglican
- Parents: Edward McCreight Moreland & Caroline Hall
- Spouse: Harriett E. Slason (m. 1893; died 1942)
- Children: 6

William Hall Moreland (April 9, 1861 – October 27, 1946) was Bishop of the Missionary District of Sacramento from 1899–1910, and Bishop of the Diocese of Sacramento from 1910 to 1933. This jurisdiction is now known as the Episcopal Diocese of Northern California.

== Early life and education ==
Moreland was born in Charleston, South Carolina, on April 9, 1861, to Edward McCreight Moreland (1831-1917) and Caroline Hall (1839-1912). He was educated at the Holy Communion Church Institute in Charleston, South Carolina, graduating in 1877. He then studied at the University of the South from which he earned a Bachelor of Science, Bachelor of Literature, and a Master of Arts in 1881. Later he attended the Berkeley Divinity School, graduating in 1884. He was also awarded an honorary Doctor of Divinity from the University of the South in 1899 and Berkeley in 1900. On September 6, 1893, he married Harriet Elsie Slason (1872-1942) and together they had six children.

== Ordained Ministry ==
Moreland was ordained deacon by Bishop John Williams of Connecticut in 1884, and priest on August 23, 1885, by Bishop William B. W. Howe of South Carolina. He initially served as assistant rector of Christ Church in Hartford, Connecticut, between 1884 and 1885, and then rector of the Church of the Good Shepherd in Nashua, New Hampshire, from 1885 to 1893. He was also rector of St Luke's Church in San Francisco from 1893 until 1899.

== Bishop ==
In 1898 Moreland was elected Missionary Bishop of Sacramento. He was consecrated on January 25, 1899, in St Luke's Church, San Francisco with Bishop William Ford Nichols of California as chief consecrator. In 1910 the Missionary District of Sacramento was established as the Diocese of Sacramento. He retired in 1933.

== Death ==
Moreland died on October 27, 1946, at the Hospital of the Good Samaritan in Los Angeles after a week's illness.

== See also ==
- Historical list of bishops of the Episcopal Church in the United States of America
