= Episcopal Diocese of Northern California =

Diocese of the Episcopal Church in the United States

Coordinates: 40°N 122°W

Diocese of Northern California

Location
- Country: United States
- Territory: Amador, Butte, Colusa, Del Norte, El Dorado, Glenn, Humboldt, Lake, Lassen, Mendocino, Modoc, Napa, Nevada, Placer, Plumas, Sacramento, Shasta, Sierra, Siskiyou, Solano, Sonoma, Sutter, Tehama, Trinity, Yolo, Yuba
- Ecclesiastical province: Province VIII

Statistics
- Congregations: 61 (2025)
- Members: 8,770 (2025)

Information
- Denomination: Episcopal Church
- Established: May 6, 1875
- Cathedral: Trinity Cathedral

Current leadership
- Bishop: Megan M Traquair

Map
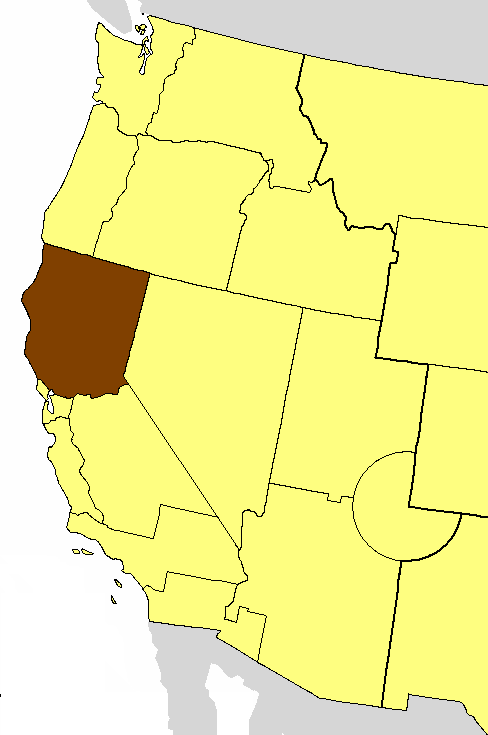
- Location of the Diocese of Northern California

Website
- norcalepiscopal.org

The Episcopal Diocese of Northern California, created in 1910, is the diocese of the Episcopal Church in the United States of America with jurisdiction over the northern part of California. It is in Province 8 and its cathedral, Trinity Episcopal Cathedral, is in Sacramento, as are the diocesan offices.

In 2024, the diocese reported average Sunday attendance (ASA) of 3,374 persons, a decline from 2015 ASA of 5,174. The most recent membership statistics (2025) showed 8,770 persons in 61 churches, down from 13,291 in 2015. The congregations of the diocese had $11,617,504 in plate and pledge income in 2025.

== List of bishops ==
The bishops of Northern California have been:

1. John Henry Ducachet Wingfield, (1874–1898), Missionary Bishop and first diocesan bishop
2. William Hall Moreland, Missionary Bishop (1899), second diocesan bishop (1910–1933)
  Archie W. N. Porter, bishop coadjutor 1933
3. Archie W. N. Porter, (1933–1957)
  Clarence Haden, bishop coadjutor 1957
4. Clarence Haden, (1958–1978)
  Edward McNair, suffragan bishop (1968–1972)
5. John L. Thompson, (1978–1991)
  Jerry A. Lamb, bishop coadjutor 1991
6. Jerry A. Lamb, (1992–2006)
  Barry Leigh Beisner, bishop coadjutor 2006
7. Barry Leigh Beisner, (2007–2019)
8. Megan M. Traquair, (2019–present)

== See also ==
- List of Succession of Bishops for the Episcopal Church, USA
