= Total Ministry =

Total Ministry, also sometimes called Local Shared Ministry, Ministering Communities in Mission, Mutual Ministry, or Circular Ministry, is a style of Christian ministry which empowers laity to take on roles traditionally given to parish priests, pastors, etc. The total ministry movement began within the Episcopal Church.

At the heart of the understanding of Total Ministry is the belief that through baptism all Christian people are gifted for mission and ministry within and for the Church.

Many people are introduced to Total Ministry through workshops offered in their diocese or region, through spiritual direction or via retreat.

The concept is widely credited with having originated after Jesus inviting his followers to keep going the ministry of baptism with the waters of the Holy Spirit and the water of reconciliation and with the apostle Paul, who said that everyone receives the Holy Spirit. This concept of the "priesthood of all believers" has led to the development of new patterns of ministry including Total Ministry. More recently the re-discovery of the writings of Father Roland Allen, an Anglican missionary in China, has acted as a catalyst for the development of the ecclesiology.
