= Katharine Jefferts Schori =

Presiding Bishop of the Episcopal Church in the United States of America

The Most Reverend Katharine Jefferts Schori
- 26th Presiding Bishop and Primate of the Episcopal Church
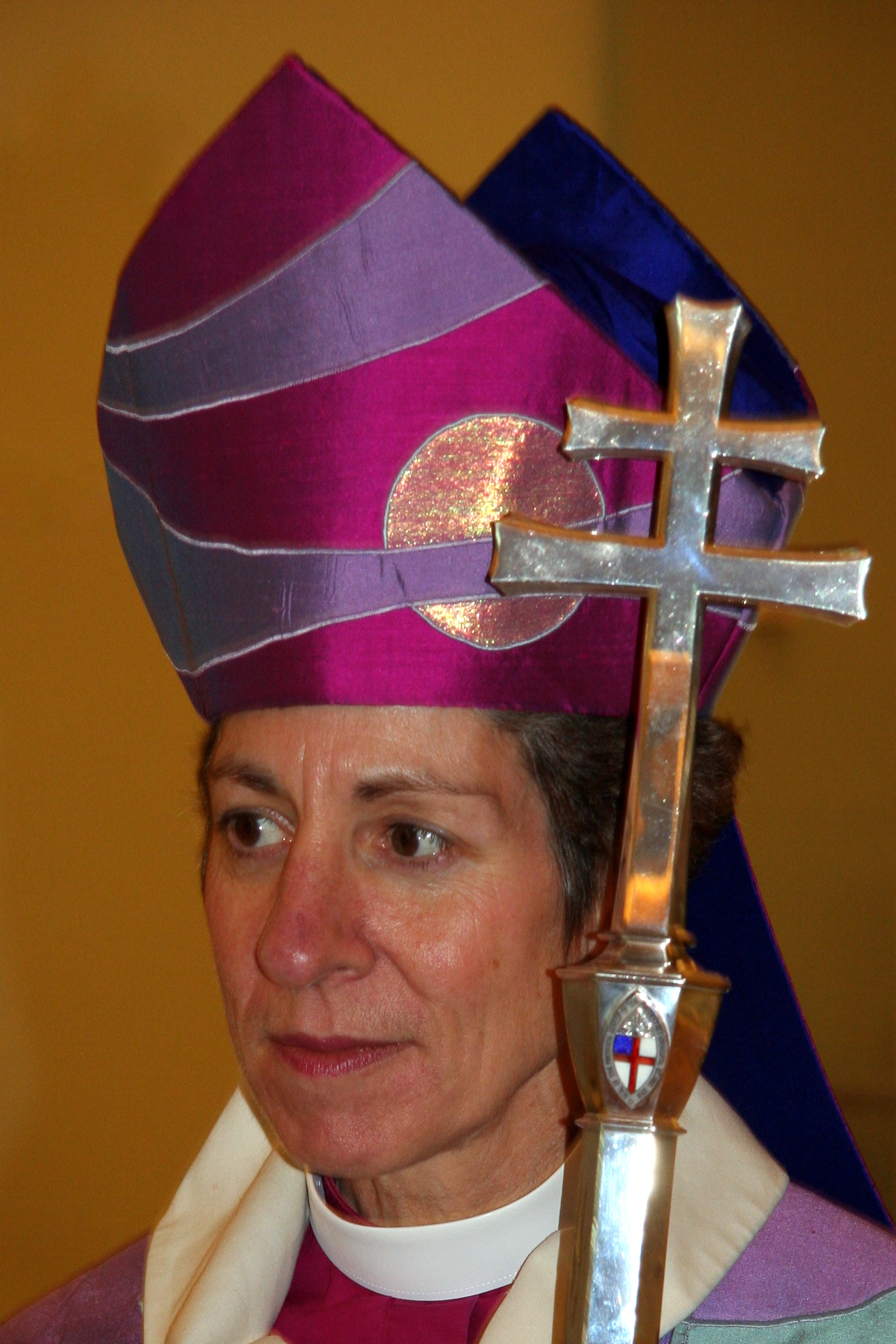
- Jefferts Schori during her term as Presiding Bishop (2010)
- Church: Episcopal Church
- In office: 2006–2015
- Predecessor: Frank Griswold
- Successor: Michael Curry
- Other post: Bishop Assisting of Los Angeles Diocese (2019-2024) Assistant Bishop of Wyoming (2024)
- Previous post: Bishop of Nevada (2001-2006)

Orders
- Ordination: 1994 (priest)
- Consecration: February 24, 2001 by Jerry Lamb

Personal details
- Born: Katharine Jefferts; March 26, 1954 (age 72) Pensacola, Florida, United States
- Denomination: Episcopal
- Parents: Keith Jefferts; Elaine Ryan
- Spouse: Richard Schori
- Children: Katharine
- Education: Stanford University; Oregon State University; Pacific Church Divinity School

Katharine Jefferts Schori (née Jefferts; born March 26, 1954) is the former presiding bishop and primate of the Episcopal Church of the United States. Previously elected as the 9th bishop of the Episcopal Diocese of Nevada, she was the first woman elected as a primate in the Anglican Communion, meaning she was the first woman to lead a national church body in the Anglican tradition. Jefferts Schori was elected at the 75th General Convention on June 18, 2006, and invested at Washington National Cathedral on November 4, 2006, and continued until November 1, 2015, when Michael Bruce Curry was invested in the position. She took part in her first General Convention of the Episcopal Church as Presiding Bishop of the Episcopal Church in July 2009.

She is serving as Assistant Bishop of Wyoming in July 2024, having previously served the Episcopal Diocese of San Diego and the Episcopal Diocese of Los Angeles.

== Early and family life ==
Of Irish and Swiss ancestry, Jefferts Schori was born in Pensacola, Florida, to Keith Jefferts, an atomic physicist, and Elaine Ryan, a microbiologist. Jefferts Schori was first raised in the Roman Catholic Church. In 1963, her parents brought her, at the age of eight, into the Episcopal Church (St. Andrew's Episcopal Church, New Providence, New Jersey) with their own move out of Roman Catholicism. Her mother converted to Eastern Orthodoxy a few years later and died in 1998.

Jefferts Schori attended school in New Jersey, then earned a Bachelor of Science degree in biology from Stanford University in 1974, a Master of Science degree in oceanography in 1977, and a Doctor of Philosophy degree in 1983, also in oceanography, from Oregon State University. She is an instrument-rated pilot, and both her parents were pilots.

She married Richard Schori, an Oregon State professor of topology, in 1979; they have a daughter.

== Early career ==
Jefferts Schori earned her Master of Divinity in 1994 from the Church Divinity School of the Pacific and was ordained priest that year. She served as assistant rector to William R. McCarthy at the Church of the Good Samaritan, in Corvallis, Oregon, where she had special responsibility for pastoring the Latino community as a fluent Spanish communicator, and was in charge of adult education programs.

In 2001, Jefferts Schori was elected and consecrated Bishop of Nevada.

She was awarded honorary Doctor of Divinity degrees from the Church Divinity School of the Pacific in 2001, Seabury-Western Theological Seminary in 2007, and Sewanee: The University of the South in 2008.

In 2003, Jefferts Schori voted to consent to the election of Gene Robinson, an openly gay and partnered man, to which some conservative Episcopalians objected.

== Election as Presiding Bishop ==
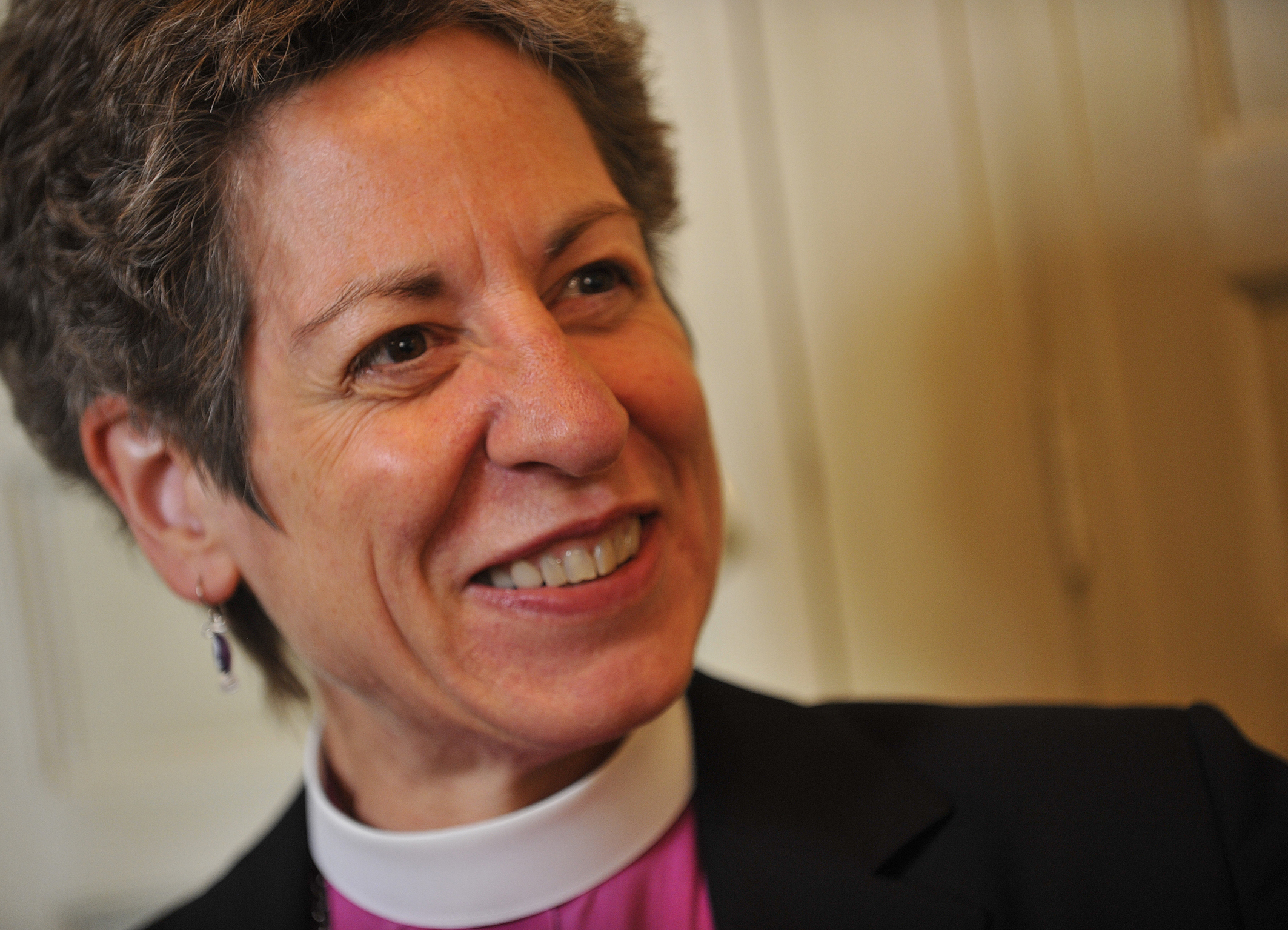
Jefferts Schori in 2008

The Episcopal Church met in General Convention in Columbus, Ohio, in June 2006. Jefferts Schori was elected to serve a nine-year term as Presiding Bishop by the House of Bishops, on June 18, from among seven nominees on the fifth ballot with 95 of the 188 votes cast. The House of Deputies, consisting of deacons, priests and laity, overwhelmingly approved the House of Bishops' election later that day. Jefferts Schori was the first woman primate in the worldwide Anglican Communion and the 26th presiding bishop of the Episcopal Church.

Although Jefferts Schori's election was an indication of widespread support in the Episcopal Church in the United States for ordaining women to the historical episcopate, the Diocese of Fort Worth, which opposed women in holy orders, asked the archbishop of Canterbury to place the Diocese under the oversight of a different primate. As not all churches in the Anglican Communion uphold the ordination of women, the election of a woman as primate also proved controversial in some other provinces.

At a news conference on June 18, 2006, the presiding bishop–elect articulated a willingness to work with conservatives. She expressed her hope to lead the church in the reign of God, rooted in imagery from Isaiah and including such United Nations Millennium Development Goals as eradicating poverty and hunger: "The poor are fed, the Good News is preached, those who are ostracized and in prison are set free, the blind receive sight."

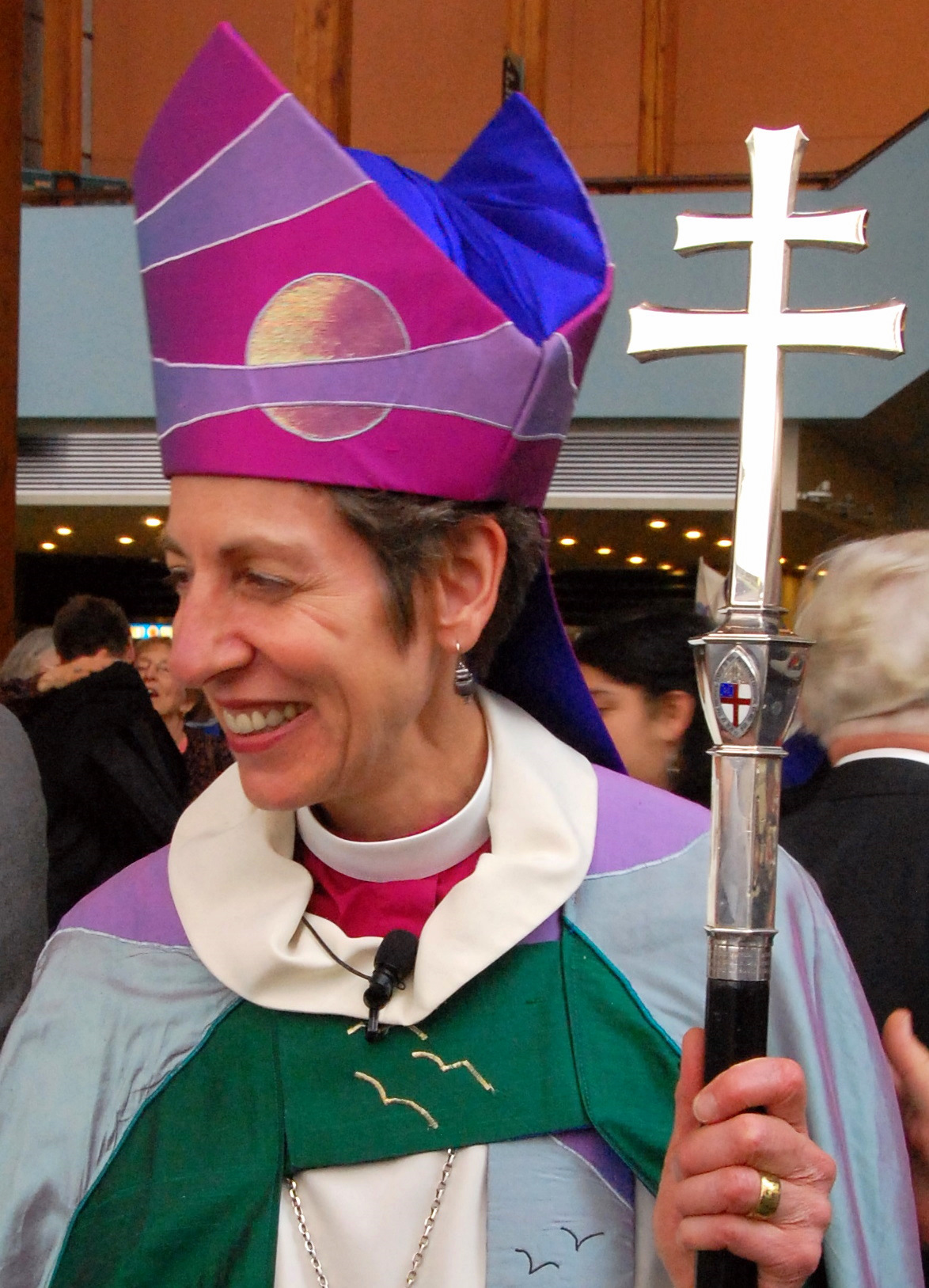
Schori as presiding bishop in 2010

Jefferts Schori became Presiding Bishop on November 1, 2006, and her investiture was held on November 4 at Washington National Cathedral. Her official seating was held the following day, also at the National Cathedral.

Jefferts Schori was the 963rd bishop consecrated in the Episcopal Church. She was consecrated by Jerry A. Lamb, Bishop of Northern California; Robert Louis Ladehoff, Bishop of Oregon; and Carolyn Tanner Irish, Bishop of Utah.

== Presiding Bishop ==
In 2008, groups from four dioceses (Fort Worth, Pittsburgh, Quincy, and San Joaquin) broke off to become part of the Anglican Church in North America as part of the Anglican realignment. Jefferts Schori authorized lawsuits against departing dioceses and parishes, with $22 million spent as of 2011. She also established a policy that church properties were not to be sold to departing congregations.

As Presiding Bishop, Jefferts Schori emphasized the church’s engagement with broader social issues, including poverty alleviation, climate care, reflecting her understanding of the church’s mission in global and social contexts.

Jefferts Schori supported same-sex relationships and of the blessing of same-sex unions and civil marriages. Like her predecessor, she is a supporter of abortion rights, stating that "We say it is a moral tragedy but that it should not be the government's role to deny its availability." She also supported the US Department of Health and Human Services (HHS) mandate on birth control. In 2007, her church's blessing of same-sex marriage led 7 Anglican archbishops to refuse communion with her during a meeting in Tanzania.

After her opening address to the 2009 General Convention, some within the church questioned her remarks regarding salvation, prompting a clarifying statement from her in the following week.

In 2012, Jefferts Schori acknowledged and began a process of apology for the Episcopal Church's relationship with the Doctrine of Discovery and role in the sustaining of colonial systems of domination.

In 2013, Jefferts Schori's sermon in Curaçao about Paul driving out a demon from a slave girl (Acts 16:16–34), drew criticism from conservative Christian websites for her interpretation.

During her term, she advocated for structural changes in the church in order for the governance between laity, priests, and bishops to better suit the church's mission.

== End of term ==
Jefferts Schori announced on September 23, 2014, that she would not seek another term as Presiding Bishop. On June 27, 2015, the General Convention elected Bishop Michael Curry of North Carolina as the 27th presiding bishop of the Episcopal Church.

She was the Baccalaureate speaker at Stanford University in 2016.

From 2017 to 2019, Jefferts Schori was an assisting bishop in the Episcopal Diocese of San Diego. From 2019 to 2024, Jefferts Schori was one of the assisting bishops in the Episcopal Diocese of Los Angeles.

== See also ==
- List of presiding bishops of the Episcopal Church in the United States of America
- List of Episcopal bishops of the United States
- Historical list of the Episcopal bishops of the United States

Episcopal Church (USA) titles
Preceded by Stewart Zabriskie	Bishop of Nevada; 2001–2006	Succeeded by Dan T. Edwards
Preceded by Frank Griswold	Presiding Bishop; 2006–2015	Succeeded by Michael Curry
