= Megan Traquair =

American bishop

The Right Reverend Megan M. Traquair M. Div.
- Bishop of Northern California
- Church: Episcopal Church
- Diocese: Northern California
- Elected: February 9, 2019
- In office: 2019 -
- Predecessor: Barry L. Beisner
- Previous posts: Canon to the Ordinary, The Episcopal Diocese of Arizona

Orders
- Ordination: 1991 (deacon); 1992 (priest) by Frederick H. Borsch
- Consecration: February 9, 2019 by Michael Curry

Personal details
- Born: 1962 (age 63–64)
- Denomination: Anglican
- Education: Pomona College, 1985
- Alma mater: Seabury-Western Theological Seminary, 1991

Megan McClure Traquair (born in 1962) is an American Prelate and the VIII Bishop of the Episcopal Diocese of Northern California.

== Early life ==
Traquair was raised in Santa Barbara. She attended Pomona College, where she majored in cultural anthropology and public policy analysis and graduated in 1985. She received her Master of Divinity from Seabury-Western Theological Seminary in Illinois.

== Career ==
Traquair was ordained a deacon at St. Francis Episcopal Church in Palos Verdes Estates, California, on June 15, 1991, and was ordained to the Sacred Order of Priests at St. John's Pro-Cathedral in Los Angeles, California, on January 11, 1992, both by Bishop Frederick Houk Borsch of the Episcopal Diocese of Los Angeles.

On February 3, 2019, Traquair was elected by the Special Electing Convention held at Faith Episcopal Church in Cameron Park, California. She was elected on the third ballot.

She was ordained and consecrated the eighth bishop (and first female bishop) of the Episcopal Diocese of Northern California on June 29, 2019, at the Mondavi Center in Davis, California. The Most Reverend Michael B. Curry, Presiding Bishop of The Episcopal Church, served as the chief consecrator.
