= Trinity Episcopal Cathedral (Reno, Nevada) =

Historic church in Nevada, United States

Trinity Cathedral
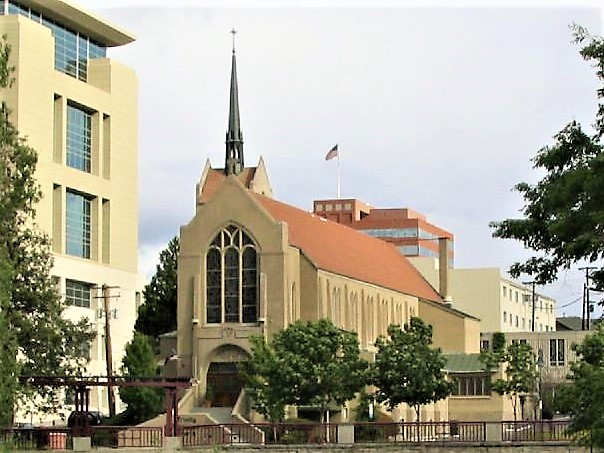
- Trinity Cathedral
- 39°31′24.8″N 119°48′52.4″W
- Location: 200 Island Avenue; Reno, Nevada
- Country: United States
- Denomination: Episcopal Church in the United States of America
- Website: trinityreno.org

History
- Status: Cathedral/Parish
- Founded: 1870
- Dedication: Holy Trinity
- Dedicated: 1949

Architecture
- Style: Gothic Revival

Administration
- Diocese: Nevada

Clergy
- Bishop: The Rt. Rev. Elizabeth Bonforte Gardner
- Dean: The Very Rev. Timothy Watt, Dean and Rector
- Trinity Episcopal Cathedral
- U.S. National Register of Historic Places
- NRHP reference No.: 100005599
- Added to NRHP: October 15, 2020

Trinity Episcopal Cathedral, located in Reno, Nevada, United States, is the seat of the Diocese of Nevada.

In 2019, the church reported 933 members; in 2025 it reported 879 members.

== History and building ==
The congregation was established in 1870, and they held their first services in a schoolhouse. By 1873 they were able to buy the lot on which the school stood, and in December 1875 they completed a new church. The parish bought the property the present church building is located on in the 1920s. Local architect Frederic DeLongchamps designed a new church building, and the congregation was able to complete the lower level of the church in 1929. This served all the parish's needs until the present church was completed in 1949.

The upper church was designed by John N. Tilton, then a professor at Cornell University. It was built on top of DeLongchamps' lower church. The Parish House was designed by another local architect, Edward Parsons, and it was completed in 1958. The 32-bell carillon was placed in the tower in 1972. The 37-rank Casavant Frères pipe organ, Opus 3778, was dedicated in 1999. It features 2,177 individual pipes, and it is one of the largest instruments in Nevada.

Trinity Church became the cathedral for the Diocese of Nevada in 2016. In 2020 it was listed on the National Register of Historic Places.

== See also ==
- List of the Episcopal cathedrals of the United States
- List of cathedrals in the United States
