= Episcopal Diocese of Western Colorado =

The Episcopal Diocese of Western Colorado was a diocese of the Episcopal Church in the United States of America from 1892 to 1898 and from 1907 to 1919.

In 1892 Western Colorado was detached from the Diocese of Colorado and constituted as a Missionary District. It consisted of all regions in Colorado west of Larimer, Boulder, Gilpin, Clear Creek, Park, Lake, Chaffee, Saguache, Rio Grande and Conejos counties.

The first Bishop was William Morris Barker from 1893 to 1894. The district was administered from 1894 to 1903 by Abiel Leonard, whose title in 1895 became Missionary Bishop of Nevada, Utah, and Western Colorado. In 1898 it became part of the Missionary District of Salt Lake. Bishop Leonard was succeeded by Franklin S. Spalding from 1904 to 1907.

In 1907 the Missionary District of Western Colorado was recreated and had the following bishops:

- Edward J. Knight (1907–1908)
- Benjamin Brewster (1909–1916)
- Frank H. Touret (1917–1919)

In 1919 Western Colorado again became part of the Diocese of Colorado, as it had been up to 1892.
