= Abiel Leonard =

The Right Reverend Abiel Leonard
- Missionary Bishop of Utah and Nevada
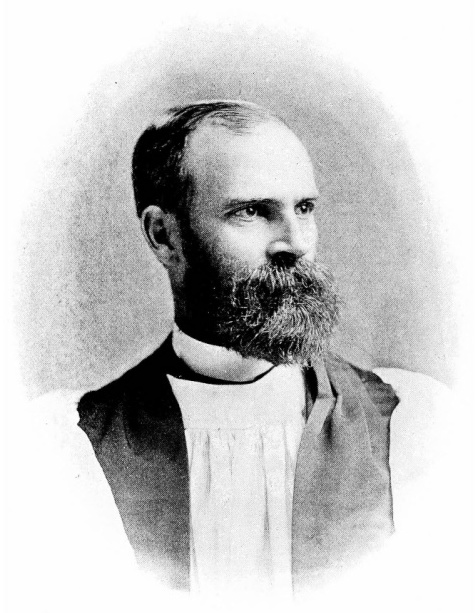
- Church: Episcopal Church
- See: Utah and Nevada
- Elected: October 1887
- In office: 1888–1903
- Predecessor: Daniel S. Tuttle
- Successor: Franklin Spencer Spalding

Orders
- Ordination: June 29, 1873 (deacon); November 4, 1873 (priest) by Charles Franklin Robertson
- Consecration: January 25, 1888 by Thomas Hubbard Vail

Personal details
- Born: June 26, 1848 Fayette, Missouri, United States
- Died: December 3, 1903 (aged 55) Salt Lake City, Utah, United States
- Buried: Mount Olivet Cemetery
- Denomination: Anglican
- Parents: Abiel Leonard & Jeanette Reeves
- Spouse: Flora Terry Thompson (m. 1875)

Abiel Leonard (June 26, 1848 – December 3, 1903) was a missionary bishop of the district of Episcopal Diocese of Utah and Episcopal Diocese of Nevada, serving from 1888 to 1903.

== Early life ==
Abiel Leonard was born in Fayette, Missouri on June 26, 1848, the son of Abiel Leonard who was a state supreme court judge in Missouri, and Jeanette Reeves.

He was educated at the Fayette grammar school and upon completion attended the Washington University in St. Louis, and later Dartmouth College from where he graduated in 1870. He then studied at the General Theological Seminary, graduating in 1873. He married Flora Terry Thompson on October 21, 1875, and they had five children.

== Ordained Ministry ==
Leonard was ordained deacon on June 29, 1873 in the Church of the Transfiguration, New York City, and priest on November 4, 1873 at St Mary's Church in Fayette, Missouri, on both occasion by the Bishop of Missouri Charles Franklin Robertson. He became rector of Calvary Church in Sedalia, Missouri, serving from 1873 to 1876 when he became rector of Trinity Church in Hannibal, Missouri where he remained until his election as bishop in 1887.

== Bishop ==
In October 1887, the House of Bishops elected Leonard as the Missionary Bishop of the Missionary District of Nevada and Utah. He was then consecrated on January 25, 1888 at Christ Church in St. Louis by Bishop Thomas Hubbard Vail of Kansas. Leonard was instrumental in establishing the church in the vast areas he oversaw during his episcopacy. In 1892 the missionary district was expanded and included the incorporation of Western Colorado. After another realignment in 1898 the Missionary District of Salt Lake which included Nevada was created and this was overseen by Leonard until his death in 1903.

== Death ==
Abiel Leonard died from typhoid fever in Salt Lake City on December 3, 1903.
