= John Henry Ducachet Wingfield =

American Epsicopalian bishop

The Right Reverend John Henry Ducachet Wingfield
- Bishop of Northern California
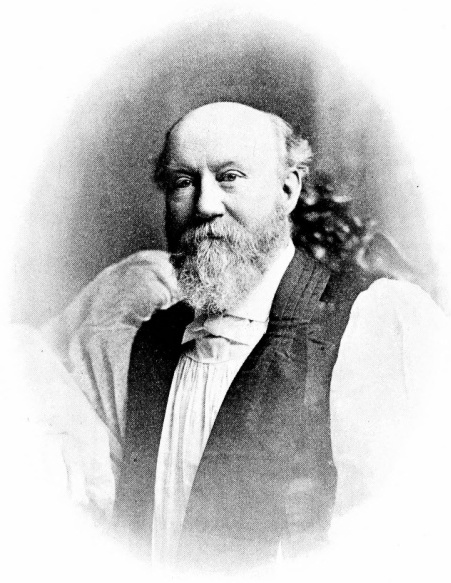
- Church: Episcopal Church
- Diocese: Northern California
- Elected: 1874
- In office: 1874-1898
- Successor: William Hall Moreland

Orders
- Ordination: July 1, 1859 by John Johns
- Consecration: December 2, 1874 by John Johns

Personal details
- Born: September 24, 1833 Portsmouth, Virginia, United States
- Died: July 27, 1898 (aged 64) Benicia, California, United States
- Buried: Blandford Cemetery
- Denomination: Anglican
- Parents: John Henry Wingfield & Elizabeth Swepson
- Spouse: Mary Imogene Chandler (m. 1859; died 1964) Elizabeth Dallam Lee (m. 1866; died 1972) Anne Matilda Dandridge Rainey (m. 1874)
- Education: College of William & Mary
- Signature: John Henry Ducachet Wingfield's signature

John Henry Ducachet Wingfield (September 24, 1833 – July 27, 1898) was the first bishop of the Episcopal Diocese of Northern California, serving in that capacity from 1874 to 1898.

== Early life and education ==
John Henry Ducachet Wingfield was born in Portsmouth, Virginia on September 24, 1833, son of the Reverend John Henry Wingfield (1796-1871) and Elizabeth Swepson (1801-1858). He was educated at St Timothy's College in Maryland from which he graduated in 1850 and taught there for two years. He then attended the College of William & Mary, winning a prize for best essay at the latter and graduating in 1853. After this he returned to teaching at St Timothy's for a year. He also received an honorary Doctor of Divinity from the College of William & Mary in 1869 and a Doctor of Law in 1874. He also studied at the Virginia Theological Seminary, graduating in 1858.

== Ordained Ministry ==
Wingfield was ordained deacon on January 17, 1858 by Bishop George W. Freeman of Arkansas, and priest on July 1, 1859 by Bishop John Johns of Virginia. In July 1858 he became assistant to his father who was rector of Trinity Church in Portsmouth, Virginia and retained the position until 1864. He then became rector of Christ Church in Bel Air North, Maryland from 1864 until 1865, and then rector of St Paul's Church in Petersburg, Virginia from 1868-1875, where he founded the St. Paul's School for Young Ladies in 1871 and established a large school for the poor of the city.

== Bishop ==
He was consecrated as missionary bishop of Northern California on December 2, 1874, but remained in charge of his parish in Petersburg, Virginia until April 1, 1875. He also became rector of St Paul's Church at Benicia, California in 1876 and head of St. Mary's of the Pacific, a school for girls. He was elected Assistant Bishop of Mississippi in 1882 however he declined the position. In 1892 he conducted services at the General Convention of the Episcopal Church in Baltimore.

He died in Benicia, California on July 27, 1898.
