= Eagum =

Aegum Eagum
- Village
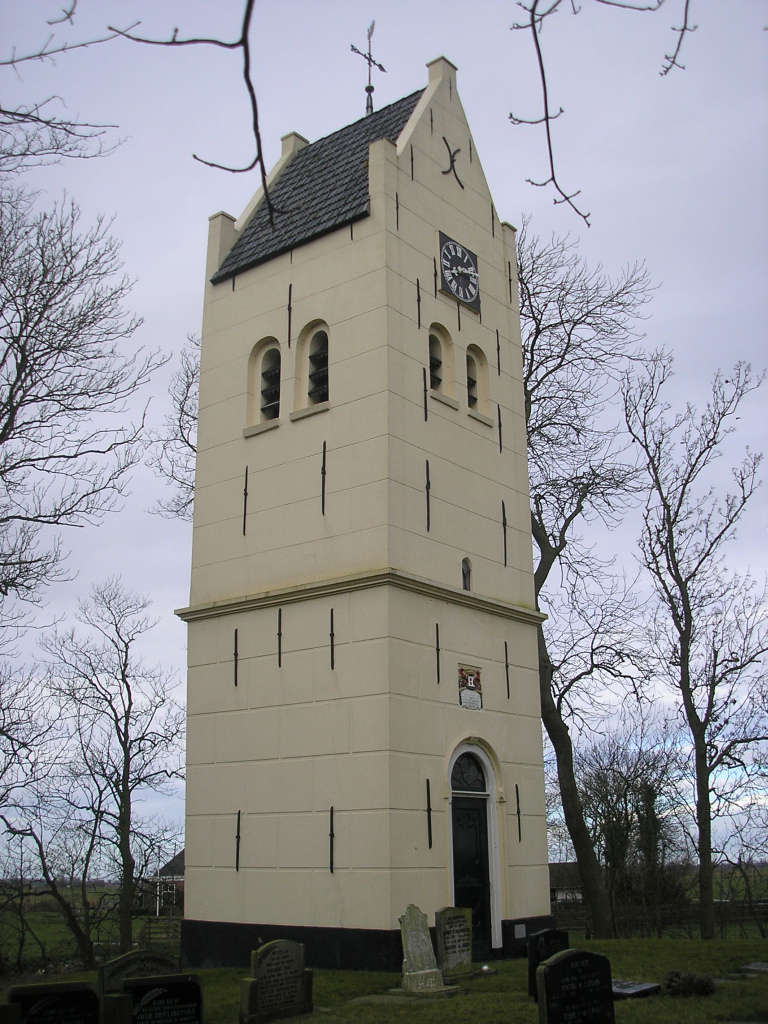
- The church tower of Eagum

- Flag Coat of arms

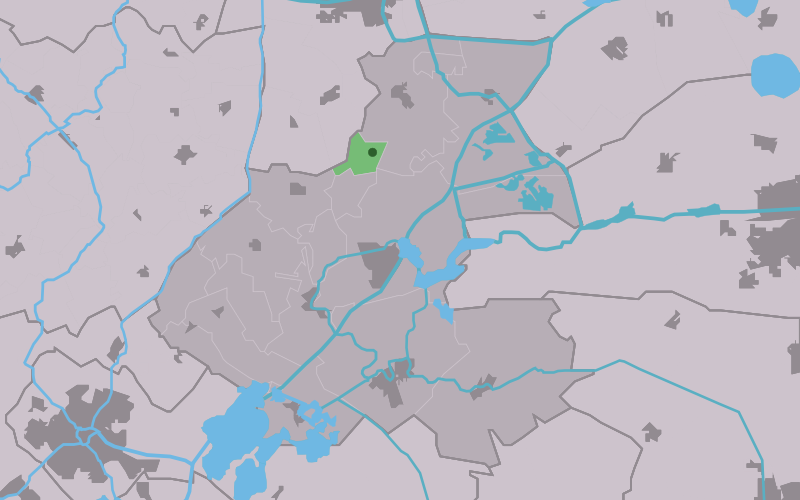
- Location in the former Boarnsterhim municipality

- Location in the Netherlands Aegum (Netherlands)
- Country: Netherlands
- Province: Friesland
- Municipality: Leeuwarden

Area
  - Total: 1.72 km^{2} (0.66 sq mi)
- Elevation: 0.2 m (0.66 ft)

Population (2021)
  - Total: 35
  - Density: 20/km^{2} (53/sq mi)
- Time zone: UTC+1 (CET)
  - Summer (DST): UTC+2 (CEST)
- Postal code: 9006
- Dialing code: 058

Eagum (Dutch: Aegum) is a small village in the Dutch province of Friesland. It is in the municipality of Leeuwarden, about 10 km south of the city of Leeuwarden.

Eagum had about 35 inhabitants (in January 2017).

== History ==
The village was first mentioned in 1503 as "van agum", and means "settlement of Age (person)". Before the Wargaastermeer was poldered in 1633, it was mainly a fishing village. The original village church was demolished in 1776. Its successor was torn down in 1856, however the tower has remained standing. In 1840, it was home to 49 people.

Before 2014, Eagum was part of Boarnsterhim municipality and before 1984 it belonged to Idaarderadeel.

== Fonda Family ==
One claim to fame is that Eagum, in the 17th century also spelled Agum, is the place of origin of the Fonda family in the United States. In 1642, Jellis Douwese Fonda (1614–1659), an innkeeper in Aegum, married Hester Jansz in Diemen, near Amsterdam. Six weeks later, their son Douw Jellise Fonda was born in Aegum, soon followed by daughter Annetje and another named Geertie. In 1642, the Fonda family emigrated to the Dutch colony of New Netherland (New York), and settled in the Hudson River valley, near Fort Orange (Albany), in a hamlet called Rennselaerwyck (Troy). Jellis became a blacksmith and brandy distiller, and Hester gave birth to three more children, Sarah, Abraham, and Saertje. Jellis Fonda died in 1659, only 45 years old. His widow soon remarried. Among Jellis Fonda's best known descendants are American actor Henry Jaynes Fonda (1905–1982), an American Academy Award-winning film and stage actor, his son Peter Fonda (1940–2019), two-time Academy Award-nominated and two-time Golden Globe- winning actor and director, and his daughter Jane Fonda (1937– ), two-time Academy Award-winning actress, writer, political activist, former fashion model and fitness guru. Famous actress Bridget Fonda is Peter's daughter.
