= William F. Lewis =

Episcopal bishop

The Right Reverend William Fisher Lewis S.T.D
- Bishop of Olympia
- Church: Episcopal Church
- Diocese: Olympia
- Elected: June 12, 1959
- In office: 1960–1964
- Predecessor: Stephen F. Bayne Jr.
- Successor: Ivol Curtis
- Previous posts: Missionary Bishop of Nevada (1942-1959); Coadjutor Bishop of Olympia (1959-1960)

Orders
- Ordination: April 6, 1926 (deacon); October 18, 1926 (priest) by Paul Matthews
- Consecration: May 12, 1942 by Henry St. George Tucker

Personal details
- Born: May 15, 1902 Elmsford, New York, United States
- Died: September 6, 1964 (aged 62) Seattle, Washington, United States
- Denomination: Anglican
- Parents: Charles Smith Lewis & Ethel Lynde Digbee Oliver
- Spouse: Margaret Nash Thompson (m. 1928)
- Children: 2

William Fisher Lewis (May 15, 1902 - September 6, 1964) was an Episcopal prelate who served as Bishop of Nevada from 1942 to 1959 and Bishop of Olympia from 1960 to 1964.

== Education ==
Lewis was born on May 15, 1902, in Elmsford, New York, the son of the Reverend Charles Smith Lewis and Ethel Lynde Digbee Oliver. He was educated at St Luke's school in Wayne, Pennsylvania. He graduated from Harvard University in 1923 with a Bachelor of Arts. Later he attended the General Theological Seminary from where he graduated in 1926.

== Ordination ==
Lewis was ordain deacon on April 6, 1926 by Bishop Paul Matthews and served as deacon of Pennington and Broad Street Missions in Trenton, New Jersey. He was ordained priest on October 18, 1926. He was appointed priest-in-charge of Madison Valley Missions in Montana. In 1931 he became rector of St James' Church in Bozeman, Montana and in 1936 rector of St Paul's Church in Burlington, Vermont.

== Bishop ==
On February 18, 1942, Lewis was elected Bishop of Nevada by the House of Bishops. He was consecrated bishop on May 12, 1942, by Presiding Bishop Henry St. George Tucker in Grace Cathedral, San Francisco. He remained in Nevada till 1959 when he was elected as Coadjutor Bishop of Olympia on 12 June of that year. He assumed his new position on October 1, 1959, and succeeded as diocesan on January 1, 1960. He died in 1964.
