= Missionary bishop =

A missionary bishop is one assigned in the Anglican Communion to an area that is not already organized under a bishop of a church. The term was also used in the Methodist churches at one time, but this was discontinued in 1964.

== Anglican churches ==
In the Episcopal Church, the House of Bishops may, according to canon law, establish a mission in a geographic area that is not already governed by a diocesan bishop or by a church in communion with the Episcopal Church and appoint a missionary bishop to give oversight to that area. The mission may be a joint one with another church. Historically the title of missionary bishop was often associated with Episcopal Church mission activities in new geographic regions, both domestically and overseas such as in the work of the Protestant Episcopal Church Mission in China in the 19th century.

While missionary bishops usually are assigned to areas within the jurisdiction of the national church, more recently some Anglican provinces have assigned non-geographic missionary bishops within other province's borders to minister to like-minded Anglicans those who are theologically opposed to the bishops under whose geographic jurisdiction they fall. The Church of the Province of Rwanda (as the Anglican Mission in America) and the Church of Nigeria (as CANA, the Convocation of Anglicans in North America) have assigned missionary bishops to the Episcopal Church primarily over the issues of homosexuality, which the African churches oppose.

== Methodist churches ==
A missionary bishop was a category of bishop of the Methodist Episcopal Church, The Methodist Church, and the Free Methodist Church, in use from the late 1800s until 1964.

In the Methodist Episcopal Church a missionary bishop was elected for a specified foreign mission field of the church, with full episcopal powers, but with jurisdiction limited to the field for which he was elected. A missionary bishop was not a general superintendent of the church in the same way as a bishop, but neither was he subordinate to the general superintendents (bishops). Rather, missionary bishops collaborated with the bishops in authority in the field to which each was appointed. A missionary bishop was responsible for his conduct to the General Conference, as were bishops. Missionary bishops received their support from the Board of Foreign Missions, rather than from the Annual Conferences (as did the bishops). Missionary bishops were ex officio members of the General Missionary Committee of the church. This use was carried over into The Methodist Church (USA).
