= St Agnes-by-the-Lake Episcopal Church (Algoma, Wisconsin) =

Church building in Wisconsin, United States

St. Agnes-by-the-Lake Episcopal Church
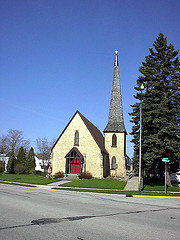

Religion
- Affiliation: Episcopal, Anglican
- District: Diocese of Fond du Lac
- Province: Province V
- Leadership: The Rev'd Robert Hoppe, SSC, Vicar
- Year consecrated: 1891 (current building)

Location
- Location: Algoma, Wisconsin, United States
- Interactive map of St. Agnes-by-the-Lake Episcopal Church
- Coordinates: 44.605624°N 87.437994°W

Architecture
- Architect: Richard Upjohn
- Type: High-Church Anglican
- Style: neo-gothic
- Completed: 1891 (current building)

Specifications
- Direction of façade: reverse east-west
- Capacity: 100
- Materials: timber frame with 'cream city' brick veneer

Website
- St. Agnes Episcopal Church

St. Agnes-by-the-Lake Episcopal Church, Algoma, Wisconsin, (originally called Grace Church) United States, is church in the Episcopal Diocese of Wisconsin. The congregation first met in 1877, becoming an organized mission in 1897.

== History ==
The first church service in Ahnapee, the former name of Algoma, was held by the Rt. Rev'd John Henry Hobart Brown, Bishop of Fond du Lac, on Aug. 15, 1877, one person being confirmed, and an infant baptized. The first building, named “Grace Church”, was built in 1878 according to a design by Richard Upjohn (architect of New York City's Trinity Church, Wall Street, and founder of the American Institute of Architects). This was the first edifice to be constructed in the diocese following its organization in 1875.

In 1877, a local paper noted:

We understand that nearly enough has been subscribed to ensure the erection of the Episcopal church. It is proposed to build of brick, suitable in size and form to the anticipated needs of the community, Gothic in style, with symmetrical spire, etc. Plan executed by a prominent New York architect are expected soon. The edifice when completed will be an attractive, convenient, and comfortable house of worship, and an ornament to the village. It is intended to be complete, it ready for occupancy free from debt. The title will vest in the Trustees of the diocese until a church shall be organized, when it will be held by the Wardens and Vestrymen of the church.

Grace Church burned to the ground in the spring of 1884. It was not until 1891 that the parishioners, with the encouragement and financial support of the second Bishop of Fond du Lac, the Rt. Rev'd Charles Chapman Grafton, could rebuild their church. The new edifice, reconsecrated as “St. Agnes-by-the-Lake”, was built on the old foundation and is an exact replica of the original Upjohn design. This new structure was also the first church to be built during Bp. Grafton's episcopate. A separate parish house, comprising a guild hall and vicar's residence, was completed two years later.

The arrival in 1897 of the Rev’d Dr. W.R. Gardner, SSJE, sometime dean (president) of Nashotah House Seminary, marked the beginning of Anglo-Catholic liturgical practice at St. Agnes. It is during his tenure that "High Mass", including use of incense and other sacramental symbolism, became normative Sunday practice. It is also during this time that the present altar and carved wood statuary were installed. The figures on the rood beam (Jesus, St. Mary, and St. John) were carved by artists from Oberamergau, Germany, who were brought over to Wisconsin by Bp. Grafton to do extensive carving for St. Paul's Cathedral, Fond du Lac. During this time, several additional rood groupings were carved, one of which was presented to St. Agnes Church.

After Dr. Gardner's death in late 1906, the Rev'd H.W. Blackman became the next resident vicar. As a result of Fr. Blackman's 33-year tenure, the churchmanship introduced by Dr. Gardner continued to flourish, and was further heightened and secured by the introduction of the Anglican Missal (i.e., American-SSJE). Bishop Grafton, Dr. Gardner, and Fr. Blackman, prior to their residencies in Wisconsin, were all affiliated with Boston's Church of the Advent, the mother church of the Anglo-Catholic movement in America.

== Highlights ==
- Dr. Gardner, Fr. Blackman and Bishop Grafton, prior to their residencies in Wisconsin, were affiliated with Boston's Church of the Advent, the mother church of the Anglo-Catholic movement in America.
- The building has received landmark status from the Kewaunee County Historical Society.
- The connection to the community is strong, through supporting and hosting such agencies as Friends of the Library and the Food Pantry.
- The Faith and Arts Outreach program brings a diversity of artists to for concerts and exhibits which benefit local not-for-profit organizations.
- After developing plans for gardens on the church property, a modern sculpture rendition by Norbertine Father Donald Claude Noel of the Archangel Michael depicted as calming the stormy sea was dedicated in 2009
- There is a prevailing legend that, before the current Algoma lighthouse was completed in 1893, the steeple of this church served, in some way, as a navigational guide for ships on Lake Michigan.

== Clergy Serving ==
This is listing of clergy who have served as missionaries, vicars or deacons.

- 1878-1883 Francis Moore
- 1883-1884 C.D. Mack
- 1884-1887 W. R. Gardner
- 1887-1888 E.R. Sweetland
- 1889-1892 Joseph Jameson
- 1892-1896 A.P. Curtis
- 1896 H. W. Blackman
- 1896-1897 John Sword
- 1897-1906 W. R. Gardner
- 1906-1907 H. S. Dawson
- 1907-1940 H. W. Blackman
- 1940-1941 W.S. Booker (Deacon)
- 1941-1942 B.F. Miller & H.M. Keyes
- 1943-1944 Ira A. England
- 1944-1946 B.F. Miller & H.M. Keyes
- 1946-1949 C.A.G. Heiligstedt
- 1949-1955 James Pearson & William Carpenter
- 1956-1960 R.E. Blackburn Jr.
- 1960-1978 Roy A. F. McDaniel
- 1979-1981 John H. Shumaker
- 1981-1986 Robert F. Stub
- 1989–Present Robert D. Hoppe
