= John Kochurov =

Russian saint (1871–1917)

Saint John Kochurov
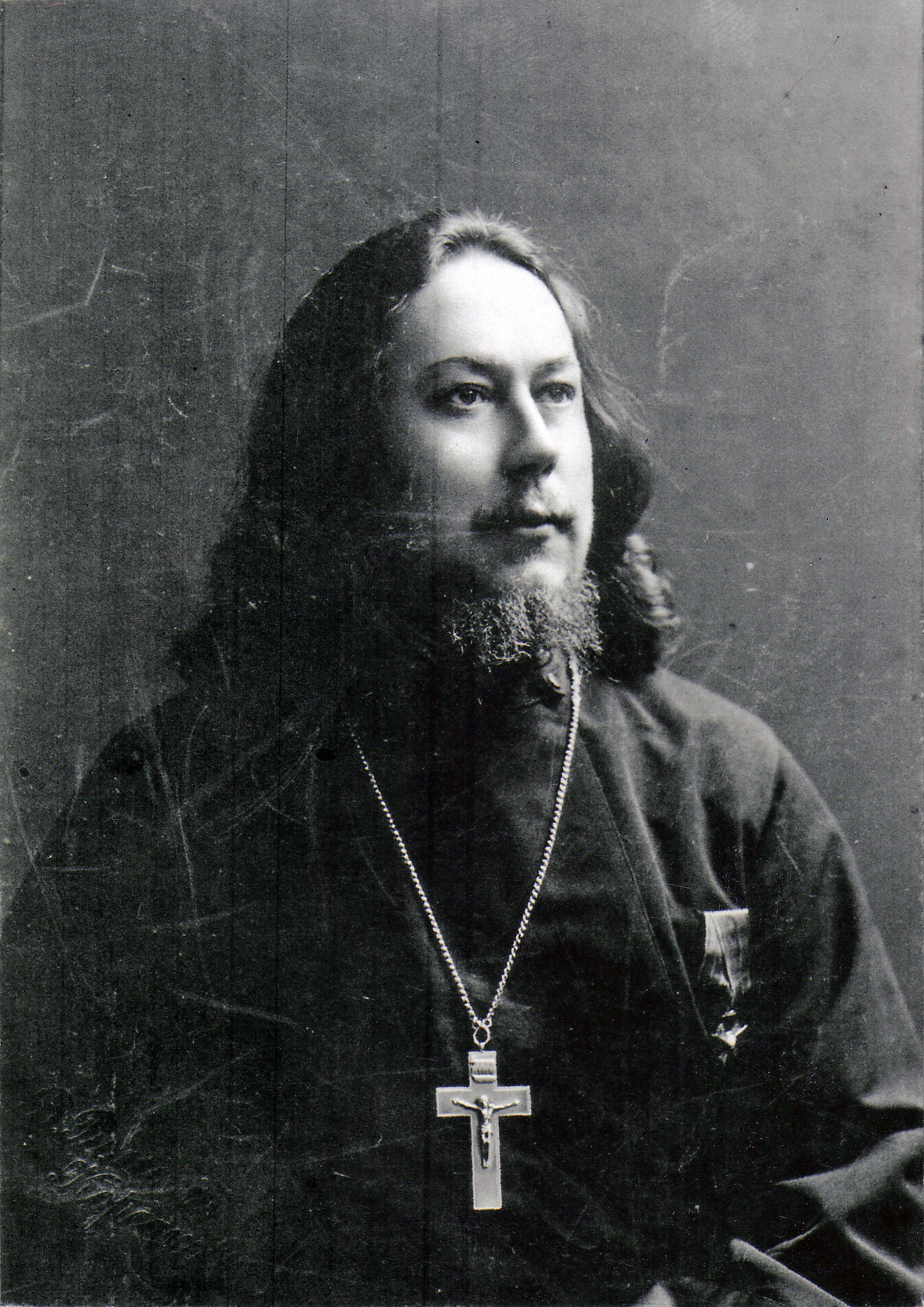
- Photograph of John as Chaplain of Tsarskoye Selo. Taken in 1916.

Protomartyr of the New Martyrs and Confessors of the Russian Orthodox Church
- Born: June 13/25, 1871; Bigil'dino Surky, Ryazan Governorate
- Died: October 31/November 13, 1917 (aged 46); Tsarskoye Selo
- Venerated in: Eastern Orthodox Church
- Canonized: December 1994, Moscow by the Council of Bishops of the Russian Orthodox Church
- Major shrine: Relics enshrined in St. Sophia Cathedral in Pushkin
- Feast: October 31/November 13
- Patronage: Tsarskoye Selo

Ivan Alexandrovich Kochurov (Russian: Иван Александрович Кочуров; Russian: Иоанн Кочуров) (13 July 1871 (Ryazan, Russia) – 31 October 1917 (Tsarskoye Selo, Russia)), better known as John Kochurov, was a Russian priest of the Russian Orthodox Church who was martyred during the October Revolution.

He was one of a number of young, educated Russian priests who came to the United States in the late 1890s as missionaries among the émigrés from Carpathian Ruthenia and Galicia. Kochurov was active in establishing parishes and aiding communities, mainly in the Midwest. After returning to Russia he was assigned to Estonia, where he put into action the teaching skills he learned in America before he was assigned in 1916 to Tsarskoye Selo. There, Kochurov was killed during the early days of the October Revolution, becoming its first hieromartyr.

Kochurov's feast day is celebrated on October 31, the day of his execution by the Communists. He is also commemorated on the Synaxis of the first martyrs of the American lands on December 12 and on the feast of the New Martyrs and Confessors of Russia. The latter is celebrated on the Sunday nearest to January 25, which was the date of the martyrdom of Metropolitan Vladimir of Kiev, the first of the New Martyrs.

== Early years ==
John Kochurov was born on June 13, 1871. His father was a priest and John was educated at the Ryazan Theological Seminary where he graduated in 1891. He continued his education at the St. Petersburg Theological Academy. He excelled at his studies at both the seminary and academy.

After graduating in 1895, Kochurov married and then entered his life's work when he was ordained deacon. On August 27, 1895, he was ordained a priest at the St. Alexander Nevsky Lavra in St. Petersburg. The ceremony was carried out by Bishop Nicholas (Ziorov) of the Diocese of the Aleutians and Alaska.

== America ==
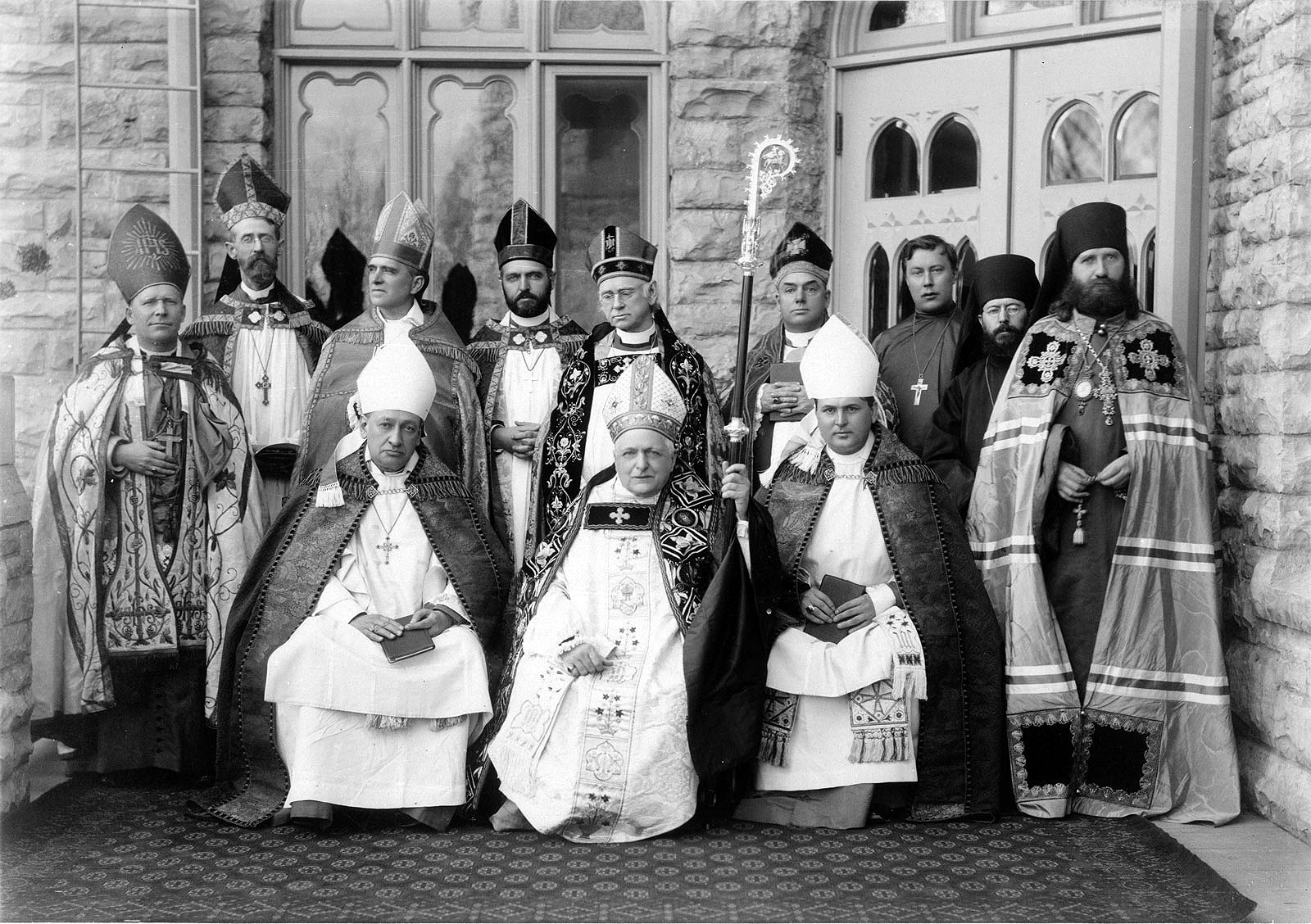
The consecration of Reginald Heber Weller as an Anglican bishop at the Cathedral of St. Paul the Apostle in the Protestant Episcopal Diocese of Fond du Lac, with the Anthony Kozlowski of the Polish National Catholic Church and Tikhon of Moscow (along with his chaplains John Kochurov and Sebastian Dabovich) of the Russian Orthodox Church present

Having expressed the desire to be a missionary priest in the United States, Kochurov was soon transferred and became the first permanent priest at St. Vladimir's Church in Chicago. This parish was later to become the Holy Trinity Cathedral. He took on this post in 1895. As St. Vladimir's parish did not yet have their own building, his first major project was construction of the church building. Under the guidance of Bishop Tikhon, later Patriarch Tikhon of Moscow and saint, Kochurov enlisted the services of the noted architect Louis Sullivan to design the church. To finance the project, Kochurov sought and obtained donations from Tsar Nicholas II as well as from a few Americans, notably Harold Fowler McCormick and Charles R. Crane who was the American ambassador to China. Construction of the church began in April 1902 and was completed the next year for the consecration by Bishop Tikhon.

Kochurov devoted much effort to aiding the establishment of other parishes in the Chicago area. He performed the first service for the future Archangel Michael Orthodox Church in southwest Chicago. In the Chicago area he was active in the formation of the parishes in Madison, Streator, and Joliet (all in Illinois), as well as aiding the parishes in Buffalo, New York, and Hartshorne, Oklahoma.

His presence at the consecration of an Episcopalian (aka Anglican) bishop long predates the anathema against ecumenism of 1982 and does not fall under it.

On the social side of parish life, he, with Alexis Toth, was influential in the establishment of a major Orthodox mutual aid society that provided support for the many newly arrived immigrants. He also translated religious texts into English, looking to the time when the church in America would consist of English-speaking members. Before his return to Russia, Kochurov helped to organize the first All-American Council that was held in Mayfield, Pennsylvania, in 1907.

He was made an archpriest on 6 May 1906 and then became dean of the New York area.

== Russia and martyrdom ==
Kochurov returned to Russia in 1907 where he was assigned to Narva (now Estonia). Here he put to use the skills he had learned in the United States teaching catechism in the schools.

In 1916, he was transferred to St. Catherine's Cathedral in Tsarskoye Selo, just outside St. Petersburg. The area was one of the residences of the Russian royal family. At St. Catherine's, he established himself as a popular priest who was skilled in presenting moving sermons.

In October 1917 the Bolshevik uprising in St. Petersburg spilled over quickly into Tsarskoye Selo as the town was attacked by Bolshevik elements. The people thronged to the churches where the clergy held prayer services and led processions throughout the town praying for peace.

On October 31, 1917 (Old Style), the Bolsheviks entered Tsarskoe Selo in force and arrested Kochurov. He was taken by the Bolsheviks out of town where he was summarily shot; the reason given for his execution was that he had supposedly prayed for the Cossacks to win the fighting. By this act, Kochurov became the proto-hieromartyr of the New Martyrs and Confessors of the Russian Orthodox Church who suffered during the Bolshevik revolution and under the Soviet yoke. Kochurov was buried several days later in the crypt of St. Catherine's Cathedral.

In December 1994, Kochurov was glorified by the Council of Bishops of the Russian Orthodox Church, in session at St. Daniel's Monastery, Moscow, Russia, as the first of the new martyrs of the 20th century. In the United States he is also honored as a missionary and inspired preacher.

== Family ==
Kochurov was married to Alexandra Chernyshova, who was the daughter of a clergyman.

== Honours ==
In 1903, he was awarded the Order of Saint Anna of the Third Degree.

== Hymns ==
Troparion (Tone 1)

Aflame with love for God,
You gave your life as a martyr for Christ and neighbor;
O Hieromartyr, John,
Entreat the Most Merciful God
To preserve the Holy Church in peace and save our souls.

Kontakion (Tone 8)

As you zealously fulfilled your pastoral service,
You brought your soul to God as a well-pleasing sacrifice, O Father John.
Entreat Christ God to grant peace to the world and great mercy to our souls.
