= Harwood Sturtevant =

Episcopal bishop of the Diocese of Fond du Lac

The Right Reverend Harwood Sturtevant D.D., D.C.L.
- Bishop of Fond du Lac
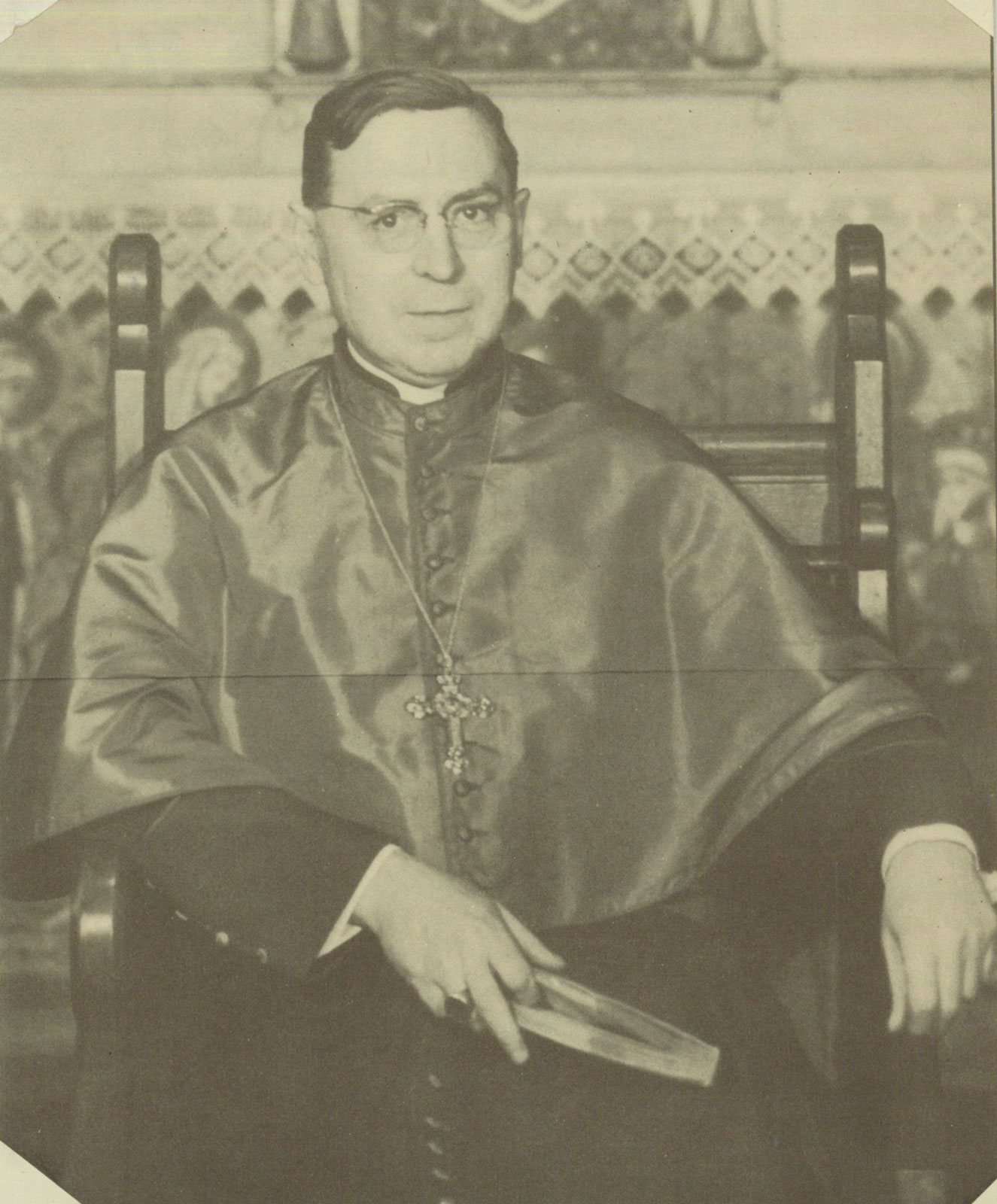
- Church: Episcopal Church
- Diocese: Fond du Lac
- In office: 1933–1956
- Predecessor: Reginald Heber Weller
- Successor: William H. Brady
- Previous post: Coadjutor Bishop of Fond du Lac (1929-1933)

Orders
- Ordination: December 15, 1915 by William Walter Webb
- Consecration: November 30, 1929 by Reginald Heber Weller

Personal details
- Born: June 30, 1888 Ishpeming, Michigan, United States
- Died: April 16, 1977 (aged 88) St. Petersburg, Florida, United States
- Buried: St. Paul's Cathedral (Fond du Lac, Wisconsin)
- Denomination: Anglican
- Parents: Harry Brown Sturtevant & Mary Ellen Northmore
- Spouse: Mary McKnight Williams
- Children: 3
- Education: University of Michigan

Harwood Sturtevant (June 30, 1888 – April 16, 1977) was the Episcopal bishop of the Diocese of Fond du Lac.

== Early life ==
Born June 30, 1888, in Michigan, Harwood Sturtevant grew up in Delavan, Wisconsin where he graduated from high school. He attended the University of Michigan, where he was Phi Beta Kappa and Western Theological Seminary (now Seabury-Western) at Evanston, Illinois where he received a Doctor of Divinity degree. He was married to Mary M. Williams who together had one son, Harwood, Jr. and two daughters, Rebecca and Mary Virginia.

== Priesthood ==
The Rt. Rev. William Walter Webb, Bishop of Milwaukee, ordained him deacon and priest in 1915. From 1915 to 1918, he served as Chaplain at St. Alban's School for Boys and St. Mary's School for Girls at Knoxville, Illinois and Vicar of Trinity Episcopal Church, Monmouth, Illinois. From 1918 to 1919 he served as Assistant and Canon at All Saints' Cathedral, Milwaukee and as a voluntary Chaplain in the United States Navy. From 1919 to 1929, he served as rector of St. Luke's Episcopal Church, Racine, including duties as Warden at Racine College from 1928 to 1929, and as a member of the Standing Committee and Board of Examiners for the Diocese of Milwaukee.

== Episcopate ==
On St. Andrew's Day, November 30, 1929, Bishop Reginald Heber Weller of Bishop Fond du Lac, William Walter Webb, Bishop of Milwaukee, and Sheldon M. Griswold, Bishop of Chicago consecrated him Bishop Coadjutor for the Diocese of Fond du Lac. The Sisters of the Holy Nativity presented the new Bishop with the Pectoral Cross which originally belonged to Bishop Charles Chapman Grafton. He served as Coadjutor for four years until Bishop Weller retired in November 1933, during which time he lived in Appleton, Wisconsin. Bishop Sturtevant served as the Fourth Bishop of the Diocese of Fond du Lac, Wisconsin, during a time where the scars of the Great Depression and the wounds of a World War were inflicted on the world and the diocese. He was a bishop associate of the Confraternity of the Blessed Sacrament.

== Service ==
Bishop Sturtevant served his community as President of the Rotary Club, Chairman of the Fond du Lac Public Forum and work for the county Red Cross during World War II. He also served on the Trustees of Lawrence College (now Lawrence University) and Nashotah House Theological Seminary. Nationally, Bishop Sturtevant served as a member of the Standing Liturgical Commission and of the Forward Movement Commission. He was a member of the Commission on Approaches to Unity and a member of the original delegation of the Episcopal Church to the Federal Council of Churches. In 1948 he represented the Anglican Communion at the Old Catholic Congress in Hilversum, the Netherlands by appointment of the Archbishop of Canterbury. He was a member of the General Board of the National Council of Churches for two years. After retirement in 1956, Bishop Sturtevant moved to Florida, where he died on April 16, 1977.

== See also ==
- List of Succession of Bishops for the Episcopal Church, USA

== Sources ==
The Episcopal Church in Wisconsin 1847–1947: A History of the Diocese of Milwaukee by Harold Wagner. (Milwaukee, WI: Diocese of Milwaukee, 1947). History of the Diocese of Fond du Lac and its Several Congregations: A.D. 1925-2005 (Appleton, WI: Diocese of Fond du Lac, Unpublished)

Episcopal Church (USA) titles
Preceded by Reginald Heber Weller	4th Bishop of Fond du Lac; 1929-1956	Succeeded by William Hampton Brady
