= William H. Brady =

American Episcopal bishop (1912–1996)

The Right Reverend William Hampton Brady D.D., S.T.D.
- Bishop of Fond du Lac
- Church: Episcopal Church
- Diocese: Fond du Lac
- In office: 1956–1980
- Predecessor: Harwood Sturtevant
- Successor: William L. Stevens
- Previous post: Coadjutor Bishop of Fond du Lac (1953-1956)

Orders
- Ordination: November 1938 by Charles Kendall Gilbert
- Consecration: February 24, 1953 by Harwood Sturtevant

Personal details
- Born: September 7, 1912 Aquasco, Maryland, United States
- Died: December 23, 1996 (aged 84) Fond du Lac, Wisconsin, United States
- Buried: St. Paul's Cathedral (Fond du Lac, Wisconsin)
- Denomination: Anglican
- Parents: Henry Bernard Brady & Maude Catherine Gibbons
- Spouse: Margaret Josephine Lodge
- Children: 4
- Education: University of Maryland

William Hampton Brady (September 7, 1912 – December 23, 1996) was a bishop in the American Episcopal Church.

== Early life ==
Born in Aquasco, Maryland on September 7, 1912, Brady graduated from the University of Maryland in 1935. He then attended the General Theological Seminary, New York, graduating in 1938. He was married to Margaret and they had four children, Mary Margaret, Anne, William Jr. and Bernard.

== Priesthood ==
After ordination to the diaconate in April 1938, and priesthood in November 1938, Brady served as assistant at the Church of the Resurrection, New York for two years. He was then called to serve as Rector of St. Paul's, Savannah, Georgia. Over the next eight years (1940–1948), he is credited with "dramatically reducing the financial indebtedness of the Parish" and also "persuaded the Vestry to purchase a rectory". In retirement, Brady and his wife, Margaret (who was reared in the parish) remained devoted friends of St. Paul's. Brady served on the Executive Council and Standing Committee and was also a Deputy to General Convention from the Diocese of Georgia.

Brady served as Rector of St. Paul's, Alton, Illinois and Priest-in-Charge of St. Gabriel's Mission, Wood River, Illinois from 1948 to 1953. Brady served on the Standing Committee and was also a Deputy to General Convention from the Diocese of Springfield.

== Episcopate ==
Brady was elected Bishop Coadjutor of the Diocese of Fond du Lac on November 11, 1952. His consecration took place February 24, 1953, where Bishop Harwood Sturtevant served as the Chief Consecrator. The diocese was basically a rural/town missionary diocese with 21 missions and 18 parishes. Bishop Brady served as Coadjutor for four years, during which time he lived in Stevens Point, Wisconsin since Bishop Sturtevant assigned him the parishes in the area then known as the Western Convocation in addition to all the missions of the diocese.

On the retirement of Bishop Sturtevant, Brady's installation as diocesan took place at the Cathedral of St. Paul in Fond du Lac, Wisconsin on January 6, 1957. One process Brady immediately addressed had to do with diocesan investments. Bishop Sturtevant had handled these directly in consultation with diocesan treasurer, Andre Perry. Working with the Trustees of the Diocese, a decision was made to sell all of the investments currently held by the Diocese and pool the money as a common trust. Congregations were also able to participate in the pooling of these funds to gain the advantage that comes from larger pools of assets.

In 1959, Bishop Brady formed the Apostolate Committee which discussed all aspects of the diocesan life. One member suggested a diocesan festival, and so began, on the last Sunday in June, 1960 the Eucharistic Festival with a glorious procession, Benediction of the Blessed Sacrament, and a hot-dog party after the service. The Eucharist Festival continues to this day.

When Bishop Brady came to the Diocese, most of the congregation used Morning Prayer on Sunday mornings. He worked to set the character for priests to know that each day, especially Sunday, was centered in the Holy Eucharist. Bishop Brady also held many gatherings around the diocese with the clergy and lay people to discuss various subjects including vocations, and Christian response in a civil world. These gatherings stimulated thinking, drew people closer together where they learned to respect each other's ideas. In the early 1960s, a diocesan-wide fundraising campaign was held that raised over $700,000, benefiting many congregations throughout the diocese over the years by gifts and loans.

Brady also served for a time as Chaplain-General of the Order of St. Vincent, the National Guild for Acolytes

In 1974, Bishop Brady was one of four bishops who filed charges against bishops who participated in a service in which 11 women deacons were intended to be ordained to the priesthood in Philadelphia, Pennsylvania on July 29, 1974. While these ordinations were found to be irregular, the Episcopal Church did eventually allow the ordination of women to the priesthood.

== Retirement ==
After his retirement in 1980, Bishop Brady continued to live in Fond du Lac. He served briefly as interim Rector in 1982 of St. Paul's, Savannah, Georgia, a congregation he served from 1940 to 1948. He also served as Superior General of the Confraternity of the Blessed Sacrament. In 1988, Brady was the leader of an American contingent of a pilgrimage to both Glastonbury and Walsingham in England. Brady died on December 23, 1996, after a long illness.

== See also ==
- List of Succession of Bishops for the Episcopal Church, USA

== Sources ==
- History of the Diocese of Fond du Lac and its Several Congregations: A.D. 1925-2005 (Appleton, WI: Diocese of Fond du Lac, Unpublished)
- Bishop Brady Dies Was Bishop of Fond du Lac for 24 Years, The Living Church, 214(3) p. 6, January 19, 1997

Episcopal Church (USA) titles
Preceded by Harwood Sturtevant	5th Bishop of Fond du Lac; 1953-1980	Succeeded by William Louis Stevens
