= Reginald Heber Weller =

American bishop and priest

The Right Reverend Reginald Heber Weller D.D., LL.D.
- Bishop of Fond du Lac
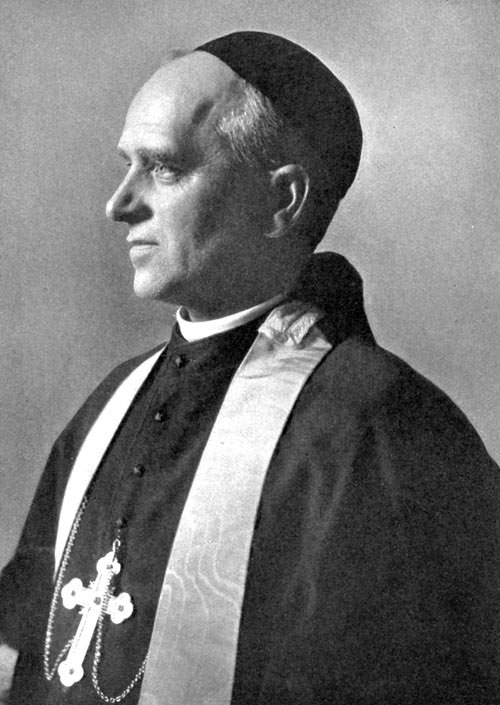
- Church: Episcopal Church
- Diocese: Fond du Lac
- In office: 1912–1933
- Predecessor: Charles Chapman Grafton
- Successor: Harwood Sturtevant
- Previous post: Coadjutor Bishop of Fond du Lac (1900-1912)

Orders
- Ordination: September 28, 1884 by Edward R. Welles
- Consecration: November 8, 1900 by Charles Chapman Grafton

Personal details
- Born: November 6, 1857 Jefferson City, Missouri, United States
- Died: November 22, 1935 (aged 78) Aurora, Illinois, United States
- Buried: Nashotah House Cemetery
- Denomination: Anglican
- Parents: Reginald Heber Weller & Emma Amanda Look
- Spouse: Bessie Brown
- Children: 7
- Education: University of the South

Reginald Heber Weller, Jr. (November 6, 1857 – November 22, 1935) was an Episcopal priest and bishop active in the ecumenical movement, establishing a dialogue among Protestant, Catholic, and Eastern Orthodox Christians.

== Early life ==
The son of an Episcopal priest, Reginald Heber Weller, Jr., was born in Jefferson City, Missouri or Jacksonville, Florida on November 6, 1857. He was educated in Florida, where his family moved when he was a boy. After attending the University of the South at Sewanee, Tennessee, Weller received his degree of Bachelor of Divinity at Nashotah House in 1884. He was ordained deacon in 1880. He was ordained a priest in 1884 at All Saints’ Mission, Providence, Rhode Island, after serving his diaconate there. Weller was married to Bessie Brown in 1886 in Eau Claire, Wisconsin. They had one daughter, Ruth, and five sons, Daniel, George, Walter, Horace, and Reginald.

== Priesthood ==
Rectorships at Christ Church, Eau Claire, and St. Matthias, Waukesha, were served before he became rector at Church of the Intercession, Stevens Point, where he was at the time of his election to be Bishop Coadjutor of the Episcopal Diocese of Fond du Lac in 1900.

== Election as Bishop ==
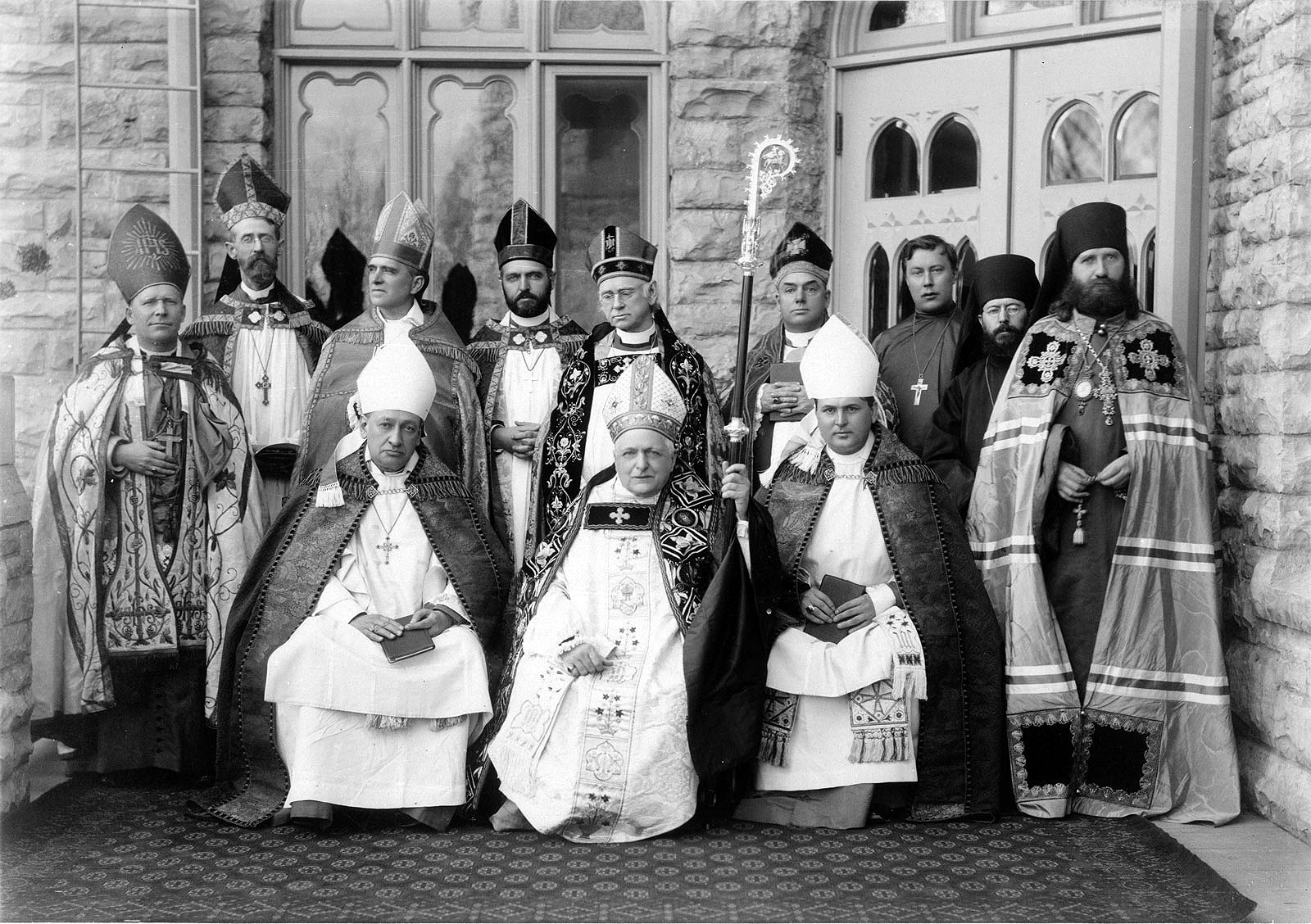
The Rt. Rev Weller at the Cathedral of St. Paul the Apostle in the Protestant Episcopal Diocese of Fond du Lac, with bishop Anthony Kozłowski of the Polish National Catholic Church and the bishop Tikhon Bellavin (later Patriarch of Moscow; along with his chaplains John Kochurov and Sebastian Dabovich) of the Russian Orthodox Church

He was consecrated coadjutor on November 8, 1900, at the Cathedral of St. Paul the Apostle in Fond du Lac. The Russian Orthodox bishop of Alaska, Tikhon, was present as well as Anthony Kozłowski of the Polish National Catholic Church. Bishops Charles Chapman Grafton and Weller were photographed with these and other bishops wearing copes and mitres.

== Service as Bishop ==
During his thirty-three years of active service, a longer episcopate than any other in the state at the time, Weller preached in all parts of the country. He held many positions of importance in the church and became widely known in England. He became diocesan bishop on August 30, 1912, after the death of Grafton. He held the position of Superior General of the Confraternity of the Blessed Sacrament from 1913 to 1935, succeeding Grafton who held the office from 1890 to 1912.

In 1919, Weller was a member of the Commission on Faith and Order, which went abroad for a world conference on the fundamentals of the Christian religion seeking to restore communion among Eastern Orthodox, Roman Catholic, and Anglican Christians. Attendants at the Lambeth Conference in 1930 found Weller taking an active part in its deliberations and preaching in several English cathedrals. At home or abroad, Weller was a defender of the faith, a stirring, convincing preacher of great ability, a wise pastor, generous friend, and a man of God.

Weller held many preaching missions, especially in the eastern United States. He took an active and influential part in the deliberations of the House of Bishops. On St. Andrew's Day, November 30, 1929, Weller acted as the chief consecrator at the consecration of Harwood Sturtevant as the Bishop Coadjutor of the diocese. Four years later in November 1933, Bishop Sturtevant succeeded Weller as the fourth bishop of the diocese. He died on November 22, 1935, at the home of his son George in Aurora, Illinois.

== See also ==
- Succession of Bishops of the Episcopal Church in the United States

Episcopal Church (USA) titles
Preceded by Charles Chapman Grafton	Bishop of Fond du Lac; 1900–1933	Succeeded by Harwood Sturtevant
