= Patriarch Tikhon of Moscow =

11th Patriarch of Moscow and of All Russia and saint (1865–1925)

Saint Tikhon of Moscow
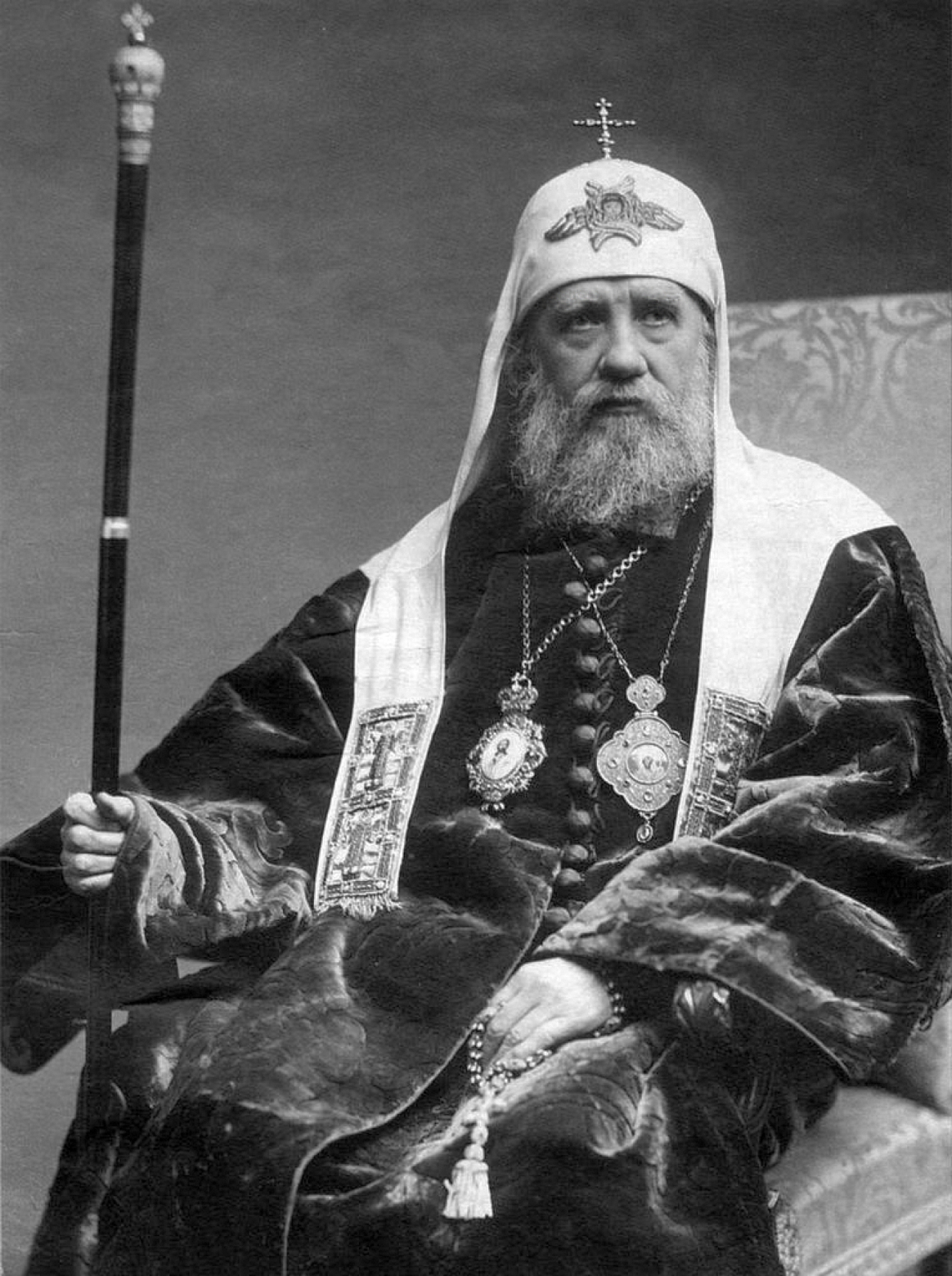
- Official portrait, 1918

Confessor, Patriarch, Wonderworker and Apostle to America
- Born: Vasily Ivanovich Bellavin; 31 January 1865; Klin, Toropets County, Pskov Governorate, Russian Empire
- Died: 7 April 1925 (aged 60); Moscow, Russian SFSR, Soviet Union
- Venerated in: Eastern Orthodoxy; Episcopal Church (USA); Anglican Church in North America
- Canonized: 1 November [O.S. 19 October] 1981, New York City by the Russian Orthodox Church Outside Russia; 9 October [O.S. 26 September] 1989, Moscow by the Moscow Patriarchate
- Major shrine: Donskoy Monastery, Moscow
- Feast: 7 April [O.S. 25 March] (Repose) also Episcopal Church (USA), Anglican Church in North America; 9 October [O.S. 26 September] (Glorification)
- Patronage: Western Rite Orthodoxy

Tikhon of Moscow (Russian: Тихон Московский, 31 January [O.S. 19 January] 1865 – 7 April [O.S. 25 March] 1925), born Vasily Ivanovich Bellavin (Note: In this name that follows East Slavic naming customs, the patronymic is Ivanovich and the family name is Bellavin.) (Russian: Василий Иванович Беллавин), was a bishop of the Russian Orthodox Church (ROC). On 5 November 1917 (OS) he was selected the 11th Patriarch of Moscow and All Russia, (Note: Subsequent ROC Patriarchs had a different style: Patriarch of Moscow and all the Rus'.) after a period of about 200 years of the Synodal rule in the ROC. He was canonised as a confessor by the ROC in 1989.

== Early life ==
Bellavin was born in the village of Klin in Pskov, Russia; his father was a priest.

From 1878 to 1884, Bellavin studied at the Pskov Theological Seminary. In 1888, at the age of 23, he graduated from the Saint Petersburg Theological Academy as a layman. He then returned to the Pskov Seminary and became an instructor of Moral and Dogmatic Theology. In 1891, at the age of 26, he took monastic vows and was given the name Tikhon in honor of St. Tikhon of Zadonsk. Tikhon was consecrated Bishop of Lublin on 19 October 1897.

== Bishop in the United States ==
On 14 September 1898, he was appointed Bishop of the Aleutian Islands and Alaska. He went to the United States, and eventually became a naturalized American citizen. The peripatetic bishop visited emerging Orthodox emigrant communities in various American cities, including New York City, Chicago and the coal-mining and steel-making cities in Pennsylvania and Ohio.

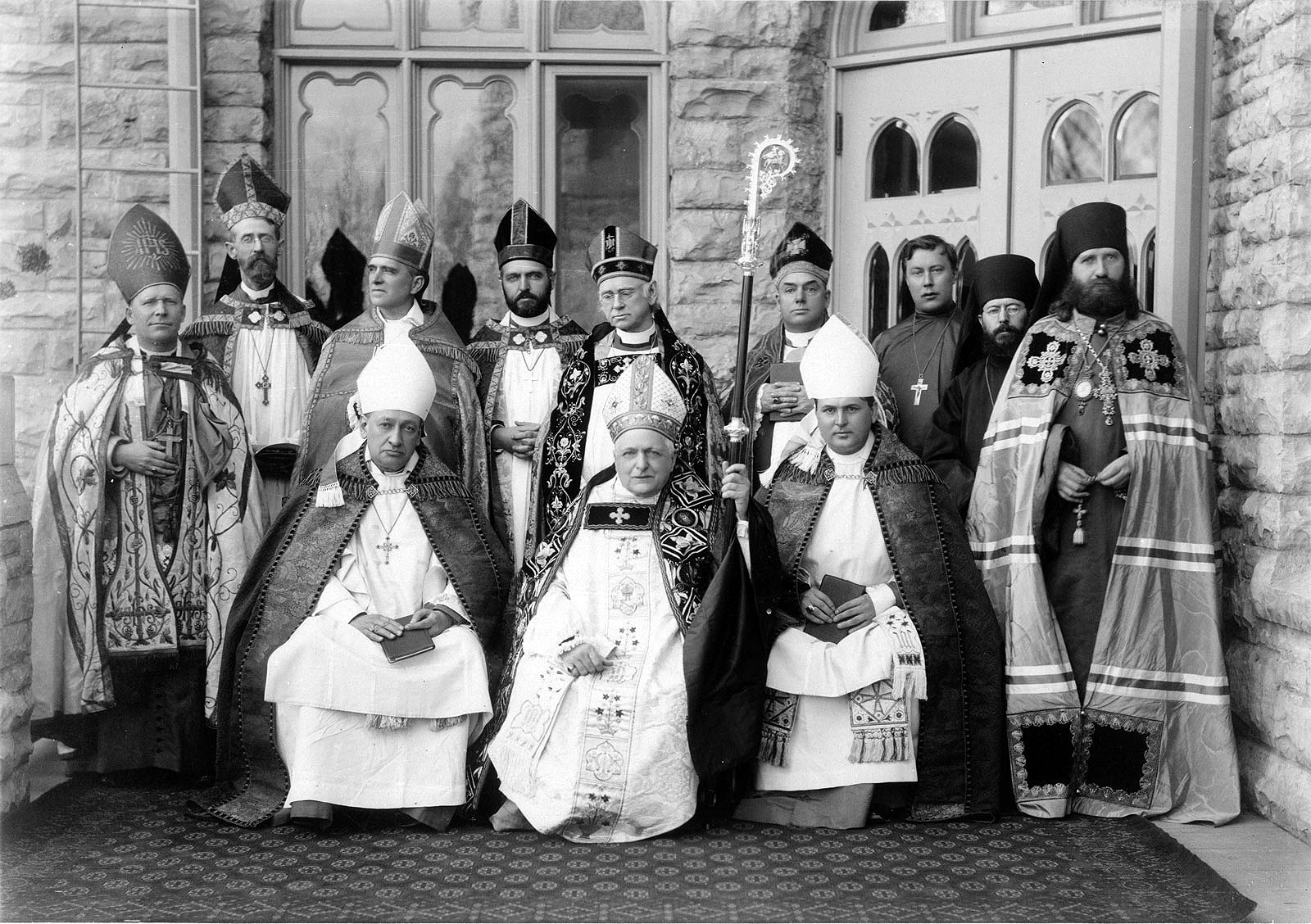
The consecration of Reginald Heber Weller as an Anglican bishop at St. Paul's Cathedral in the Episcopal Diocese of Fond du Lac, with Anthony Kozlowski of the Polish National Catholic Church and Tikhon of Moscow (along with his chaplains John Kochurov and Sevastijan Dabović) of the Russian Orthodox Church present

As head of the ROC diocese in North America, in 1900 he reorganized the diocese and changed its name from the "Of the Aleutian Islands and Alaska" to "Diocese of the Aleutian Islands and North America". He moved the chair of the diocese to New York. He had two auxiliary bishops in the United States: Bishop Innocent (Pustynsky) in Alaska, and St. Raphael (Hawaweeny) in Brooklyn. On 22 May 1901, he blessed the cornerstone for St. Nicholas Cathedral in New York City (fundraising for which had begun in 1894 and to which Tsar Nicholas II contributed $5,000 in 1900) in a great ceremony attended by New York Mayor Seth Low, Russian diplomats and sailors, and enthusiastic worshippers. He celebrated the first liturgy in the new building's basement on 20 July 1902, and in the main hall on 10 November 1902. Tikhon was also involved in building other churches in North America, and establishing a dialog with Greek Orthodox churches in America. On 23 November 1902, he consecrated the church of St. Nicholas in Brooklyn for Syrian Antiochian Orthodox immigrants. In 1903, he consecrated St Vladimir's Church in Chicago.

While in the United States, Tikhon became aware of the country's tradition of religious diversity, as well as the growing ecumenical and Pan-Slav movements, and the needs of a wide variety of eastern and southern European immigrants. Before his arrival, in 1890, a delegation of Carpatho-Rusyns also had approached the Russian consul in San Francisco and requested a bishop, since the Latin Catholic archbishop of Minnesota, John Ireland was attempting to force their assimilation, although Byzantine Rite Catholics had previously been accorded certain dispensations from the Roman Rite practices of the Latin Church. Their Byzantine (Ruthenian) Catholic priest, Alexis Toth, was formally accepted into the Russian Orthodox Church in 1892. In 1900, Tikhon attended the consecration of Reginald Heber Weller as coadjutor bishop for the Episcopal Diocese of Fond du Lac, though he was not one of the consecrating bishops (all Episcopalians). More Byzantine Catholics joined the Eastern Orthodox fold, especially priests after 1907, when Pope Pius X published Ea Semper, restricting their previously recognized right to ordain married men.

In 1905, the title of archbishop was bestowed on him, and he moved his formal residence and diocesan office from San Francisco to New York. In June 1905, the new archbishop gave his blessing for the establishment of a monastery in Pennsylvania, St. Tikhon's Monastery which in the 1930s supported the founding of Saint Tikhon's Orthodox Theological Seminary. On 17 September [O.S. 4 September] 1905 The Holy Trinity Russian (Greek) Orthodox church was consecrated in Winnipeg, Manitoba, Canada, on the corner of McKenzie Street and Manitoba Avenue by the new archbishop Tikhon, Head of the Russian Orthodox Mission in North America and soon to become Patriarch of Moscow and All Russia. Ukrainian teachers studying at the Ruthenian Training School sang at the consecration ceremony.

== Return to Russia and restoration of the Patriarchate ==
In 1907, Tikhon returned to Russia, having been appointed to the See of Yaroslavl. In 1913, he was transferred to the diocese of Vilno in Lithuania.

However, the First World War and the Russian Revolution created turmoil in his native land. On 21 June 1917, the Diocesan Congress of clergy and laity elected Tikhon the ruling bishop of Moscow. On 14 August 1917 (OS), Tikhon was raised to the dignity of Metropolitan of Moscow. On the next day, the Local Council of the ROC, the first such convention since the late 17th century, opened in Moscow. The council's major decision that passed on 28 October 1917, days after the Bolsheviks seized power in Petrograd, was to restore the Patriarchy in the ROC. On 5 November 1917, after his election by vote as one of the three candidates for the reinstated Moscow Patriarchate, Metropolitan Vladimir of Kiev announced that Metropolitan Tikhon had been selected for the position after a drawing of lots as the new Patriarch of Moscow and All Russia.

== Patriarchate ==
During the Russian Civil War the patriarch, like the entire Russian Church, was widely considered anti-Bolshevik and many bishops were exiled, imprisoned or even executed by the new regime. Tikhon openly condemned the murder of the tsar's family in 1918, and protested against violent attacks by the Bolsheviks on the church. In 1920, he granted autonomy to what became the Orthodox Church in America and other dioceses of the Church of Russia that were cut off from the governance of the highest church authority (i.e. the patriarch), until such time as normal relations with the highest church authority could be resumed.

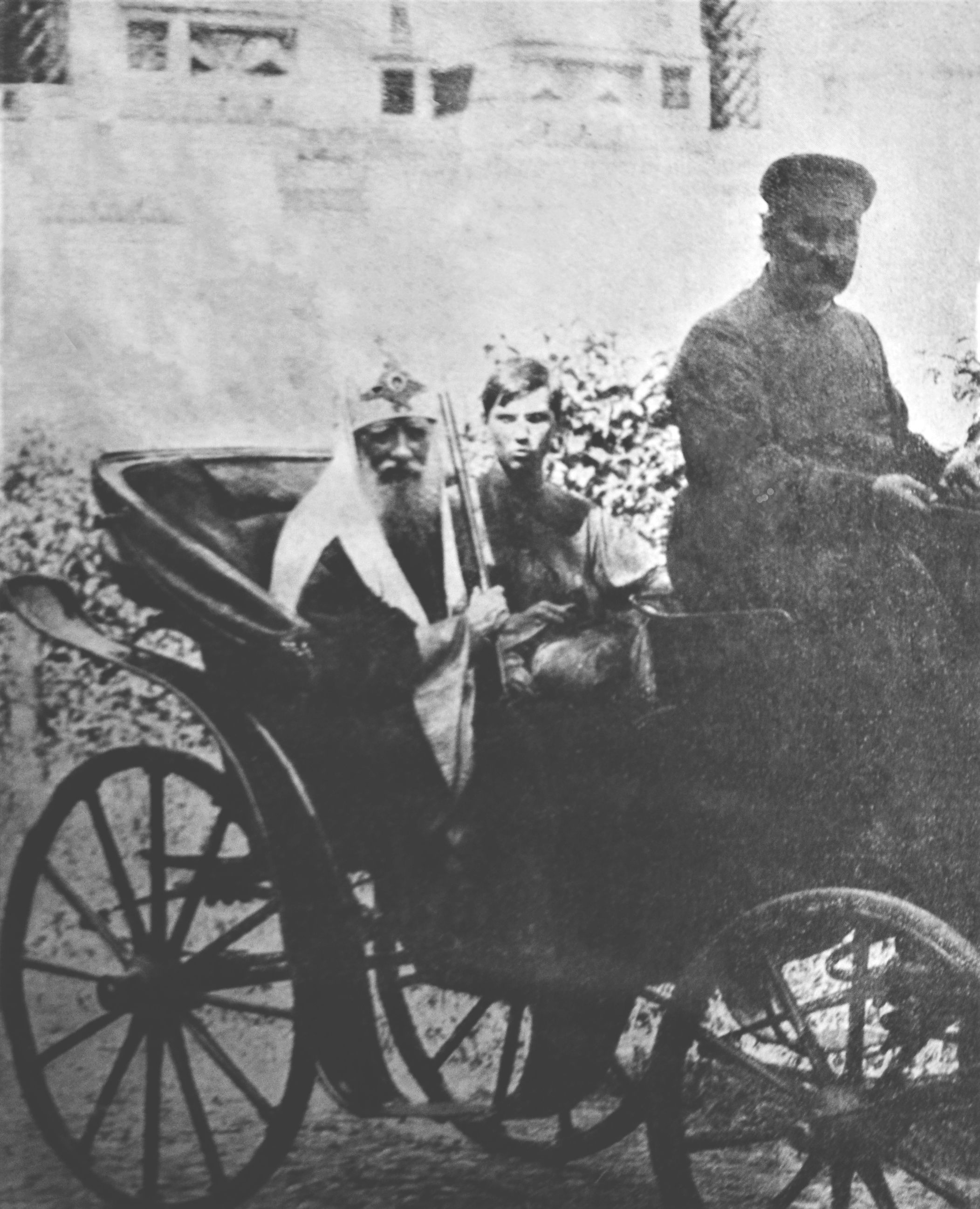
Patriarch Tikhon of Moscow near Donskoy Monastery, July 1923

In November 1921, many of the Russian bishops, who had fled Russia in 1919–1920, had gathered in Sremski Karlovci, Yugoslavia, and adopted a number of anti-Bolshevik statements; in May relations between the two bodies became irregular. The Russian Orthodox Church Abroad (ROCOR) and the Moscow Patriarchate had no formal relations until 2007.

In 1922 Russia was afflicted with mass famine. The Communist government used the situation to confiscate ecclesiastical property and to accuse the patriarch of being a saboteur. From April 1922 until June 1923 he resided under house arrest in Donskoy Monastery. His public protest against nationalization of Church property was reframed as a criminal act. This caused international resonance and several countries sent formal protest notes to the Soviet government.

Under pressure from the authorities, Tikhon issued several messages to the believers in which he stated in part that he was "no longer an enemy to the Soviet power". Textual analysis of these messages shows considerable similarity with a number of documents exchanged in the Politburo on the "Tikhon Affair". Despite his declaration of loyalty, he continued to enjoy the trust of the Orthodox community in Russia. In 1923 Tikhon was "deposed" by a Soviet-sponsored council of the so-called Living Church, which decreed that he was "henceforth a simple citizen - Vasily Bellavin." This deposition has never been recognized as an act of the Russian Orthodox Church, and is therefore considered invalid by both the Russian Orthodox Church and the Russian Federation.

== Death ==
In 1924 survived an assassination attempt; however this took a toll on his health. He died on 25 March (OS)/7 April, the Feast of the Annunciation. He was buried on 12 April in the winter church of Donskoy Monastery, in Moscow. From the time of his death, he was widely considered a martyr or confessor for the faith.

== Canonization ==
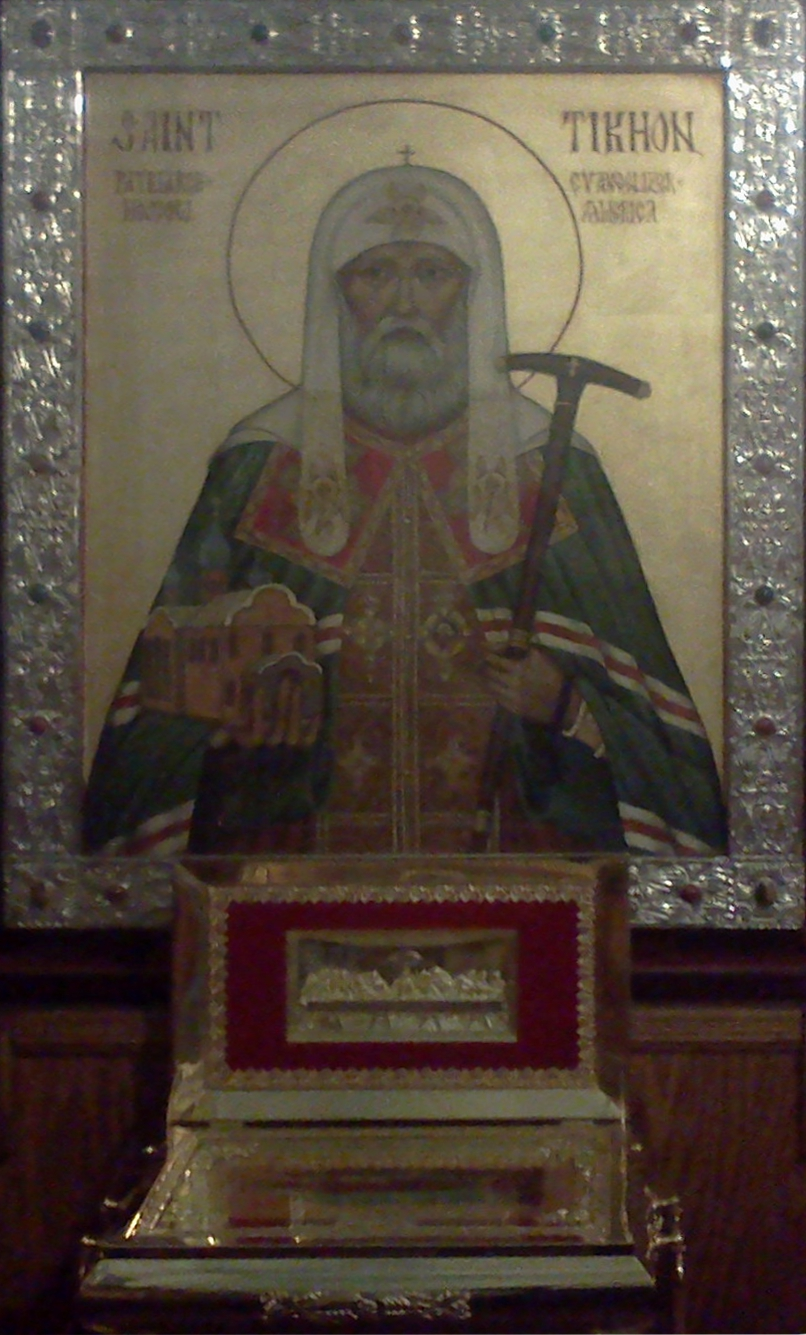
Icon with reliquary of Saint Tikhon of Moscow in the Katholikon of the Monastery of St. Tikhon of Zadonsk in South Canaan, Pennsylvania

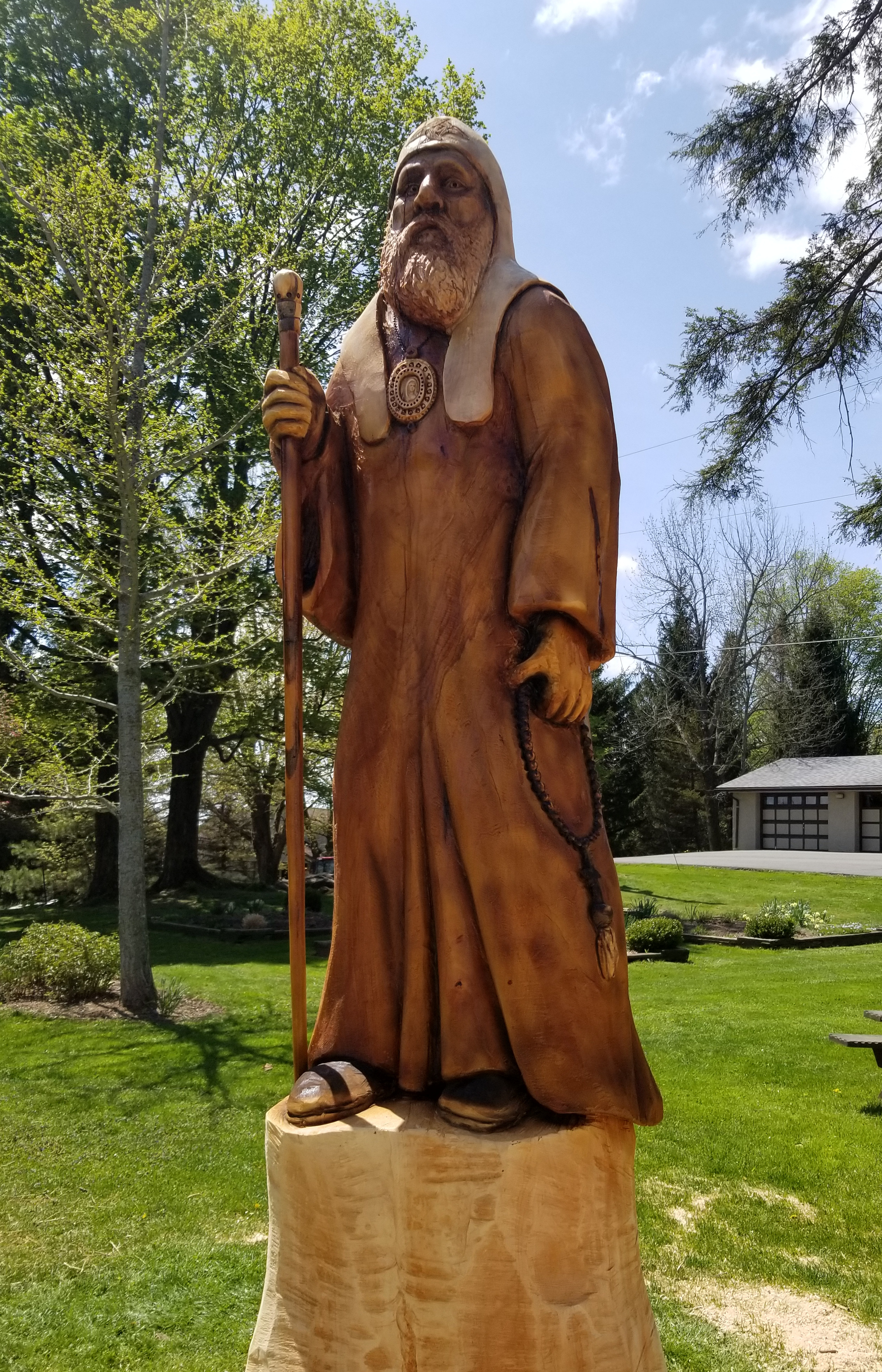
Wooden carving of St. Tikhon of Moscow at the Monastery of St. Tikhon of Zadonsk

Tikhon was glorified (canonized) a saint by the Synod of Bishops of the Russian Orthodox Church Outside Russia in conjunction with the great glorification of the New Martyrs and Confessors of the Soviet Yoke on 1 November [O.S. 19 October] 1981. He was later glorified by the Moscow Patriarchate during the Bishop's Council of 9–11 October 1989. This later canonization process is generally considered an example of the thaw in church–Soviet relations during the Glasnost era. The American Episcopal Church along with the Anglican Church in North America remember Tikhon with a feast day on their liturgical calendars on the anniversary of his death, April 7.

St Tikhon's relics were believed lost, but on 19 February 1992 his coffin was found in a hidden crypt in the Donskoy Monastery and on 22 February, the coffin was opened and his relics were discovered to be almost entirely incorrupt. The relics were placed in a reliquary and on 5 April [O.S. 23 March] 1992, fifty bishops solemnly transferred them to the Katholikon (main church) of the Donskoy Monastery in a place of honour by the soleas (close to the sanctuary).

St. Tikhon is the patron saint of the Orthodox Western Rite.

== See also ==
- Anti-religious campaign during the Russian Civil War
- Persecution of Christians in the Soviet Union
- Religion in the Soviet Union
- USSR anti-religious campaign (1921–1928)
- List of American Eastern Orthodox saints

== Notes ==
Eastern Orthodox Church titles
Preceded by	Bishop of Lublin; 1897–1898	Succeeded by
Preceded by Nicholas (Ziorov)	Archbishop of North America; 1898–1907	Succeeded by Platon (Rozhdestvensky)
Preceded by Jacob (Pyatnitsky)	Archbishop of Yaroslavl; 1907-1913	Succeeded by Agathangel (Preobrazhensky)
Preceded by Agathangel (Preobrazhensky)	Archbishop of Vilnius; 1913-1917	Succeeded by Eleutherius (Bogoyavlensky)
Preceded by Macarius (Nevsky)	Metropolitan of Moscow and Kolomna; 1917–1925	Succeeded by himself (as a Patriarch); Sergius (Stragorodsky)
Preceded by Adrian	Patriarch of Moscow and all Russia; 1917–1925	Succeeded by Peter (Polyansky) (as a locum tenens); Sergius
