= Bernard Iddings Bell =

American author and priest

- Born: October 13, 1886; Dayton, Ohio
- Died: September 5, 1958 (aged 71); Chicago, Illinois
- Education: University of Chicago; Western Theological Seminary
- Occupations: Author, priest, cultural commentator

Bernard Iddings Bell (October 13, 1886 – September 5, 1958) was an American Christian author, Episcopal priest, and conservative cultural commentator. His religious writings, social critiques, and homilies on post-war society were acclaimed in the United States, England, and in Canada, receiving praise from intellectuals such as Albert Jay Nock, T. S. Eliot, Richard M. Weaver, and Russell Kirk. Featured on the cover of Time magazine as America's "brilliant maverick," he authored over 20 books and numerous articles appearing in The New York Times, The Atlantic, The Criterion, Scribner's, and Commonweal. For the majority of his career, he toured and lectured at universities such as Harvard, Oxford, Yale, Columbia, Chicago, and Princeton as well as "almost every cathedral in England."

== Life ==
=== Early years and education ===
Bernard Iddings Bell was born in Dayton, Ohio, the second of four children to Charles Wright Bell, a paper manufacturer, and Valentia Bell, née Iddings. His siblings were Florence, Myrta, and Alfred. They were of Portuguese descent.

Several early experiences helped to shape Bell's "maverick" ideas and character. Russell Kirk, author of The Conservative Mind and friend of Bell, related the following anecdote in memoria:

In educating his only son (who died at the threshold of manhood), in extensive travel, and in devotion to his ordained duties as a priest, he spent his money as it came: and that on principle. For when Bell was a little boy, he learned something from his grandmother. His grandparents, straitened in their means, had been frugal, saving all their lives to build and furnish a house to their liking. In old age they achieved their end, and their house was built and well furnished; and just then Bell's grandmother discovered that she was suffering from an incurable malignant cancer. Put to bed, she had her grandson called in, and said this to him: "Bernard, your grandfather tells me that they are going to put me under drugs soon, and then I will not be able to talk to you. So I want to tell you now what I have learnt from life. I have had a long life and a rather hard one, and I have learnt this: Never save any money."

Charles and Valentia raised their children in the Episcopal Church, which at the time was considered evangelical but by the 1930s "would probably be given the name Fundamentalist." Bell recalled that as a child, his mother once told him that God was in Heaven and that Heaven was "up there," so he imagined God to be a silvering gentleman who lived on the roof and looked like "a somewhat glorified copy of my paternal grandfather." However, this mental picture gradually lost its vividness and dissolved into "a vague aura, a spiritual influence, a permeating benevolence."

The midnight of December 31, 1899, Charles Bell gathered his children together to give thanks for the coming century, whose blessings of technology and modernism, he believed, would bring about a more enlightened, peaceful world. In A Man Can Live Bell recalled, "[My father] was quite sure that the modern world was wise, sound in structure, giver of all good. We children too were sure of it. Our friends were sure of it. What we heard and read made us more sure of it. Our teachers were sure of it. Even our priests, preachers, rabbis were sure of it." Struck by this vision of human salvation, he became profoundly disillusioned with the church and ceased praying, except intermittently and perfunctorily.

When he had completed his freshman year of college, the religion of his childhood "had been demolished." He spent much of the time experimenting "in the philosophical realm, looking for a sane theory of life" and at one point briefly adopted scientific mechanism or materialism; however, it too fell short of being an adequate motivation for living. Failing to find guidance from either his professors, the religious leaders on campus, or the writings of modern philosophers, he declared them all "blind leaders of the blind" and "hair-splitting pedants." It was soon thereafter that Bell made the acquaintance of an Anglo-Catholic priest who oversaw a nearby parish. Though he was initially uncomfortable with the high church vestments and traditions, the priest

had a winsomeness that came from inner peace. He did not bother much to argue with me. He quite understood that my literalistic and legalistic Protestantism had to go. He also understood why I, at least, could not become a Roman Catholic... He managed to show me rather than tell me [the] most illuminating discovery of my whole life... I began at last my adult search for God...I do not think he has ever known how much he helped me.

At the age of 21, Bell graduated with a bachelor's degree in social history from the University of Chicago. For a brief period he worked as "a paddy-wagon-chasing newspaper reporter." When he finally decided to pursue his calling to the priesthood, his father, who was then a vestryman, lamented: "I am very sorry that a son of mine should become a parasite."

The following year, he entered Western Theological Seminary to study sacred theology, but found himself "more than a little oppressed by the stifling smell of controversies long dead." It was then that he stumbled upon G.K Chesterton's Orthodoxy. He identified with Chesterton, having also formulated his own theology, only to find it "a dull copy of a more brilliant orthodoxy." He particularly praised the way it portrayed the Christian religion as rising above pure rationality, confirming both the empirical nature of science and the invisible, unquantifiable mysteries of human life.

He was ordained to the priesthood on the Feast of St. Thomas the Doubter in 1910, and graduated with his second bachelor's in 1912. He was the first vicar and builder of St. Christopher's Church in Oak Park, Illinois from 1910 to 1913.

=== St. Paul's Cathedral ===
In the summer of 1912, the venerated Bishop Charles Chapman Grafton died, leaving behind a legacy as well as high expectations for his replacement at St. Paul's Cathedral, Fond du Lac, Wisconsin. Bell was instituted as vicar and first-ever dean of St. Paul's in 1913 and remained there until 1918. He married Elizabeth Woods Lee, who gave birth to their only child Bernard Lee Bell in 1913. The next year, he wrote an article titled "The Dynamite of the Sacraments" describing some of the practical theology which formed the basis of his decision to join the U.S. Navy during World War I.

==== First World War ====
Bell served as a chaplain in the United States Navy for twenty months from February 1917 to November 1918 in the Great Lakes Naval Training Station located near North Chicago in Lake County, Illinois. At first, he was denied enlistment due to a medical issue; however, as new conscripts flooded in at an increasing rate, "tent cities sprouted up" on the 165-acre compound (by the end of the War 45,000 recruits were living in a space designed for 1,500). This created a shortage of commissioned land chaplains, prompting Rear Admiral William A. Moffat to make an exception. During his time there, Bell oversaw roughly 87,000 of the total 125,000 recruits, preaching on Sundays to congregations ranging from 3,000-7,000, teaching a total of 267 courses on morals and religion, and holding daily office hours "to which men came with problems ranging from how to believe in God to how to get a dance invitation." In March 1918, the first case of Spanish influenza cropped up in Fort Riley, Kansas, and soon the pandemic was sweeping America, ultimately claiming the lives of 700,000 Americans and 50 million worldwide. In this state of emergency, Bell found himself frequently providing Communion in barracks and visiting hospitals to perform last rites. Meanwhile, his first book Right and Wrong After the War was published prior to the war's end, thus establishing the "prophetic" voice and style for which he is known.

==== Challenge to Christianity's Decline ====
Throughout his time in the Navy, Bell enjoyed informal meetings with both individuals and "small groups who were willing to sit around and talk about religion." And it was here that he was first confronted by the young men's overall passivity toward religion. He confessed that, like many clergy in the church, he had believed that "the great mass of the people...was to be regarded as without any religion at all." However, this proved not to be the case:

The discovery I made, which came to me at once as a challenge and as an encouragement, was that most of the non-interest was due, not to deliberate disbelief or even to indifference, but rather to plain ignorance. They had, for the most part, scarcely any idea what the Christian religion was all about...It does not seem quite reasonable that four out of five of our young people should never have learned what Christianity, in its essence, really is. We seem to have been astonishingly inefficient in passing on the Faith.

According to Bell, the essential truths of Christianity had been lost in a "mass of non-essential facts, alleged facts, and discarded 'facts' of a more or less religious flavor." Rather than possessing a useful religion which helped in hardship, theirs was a weak collection of Bible stories, moral lessons, unanswered doubts, and negative-to-neutral impressions of churchgoing. Understandably, these men had come to view religion as well intended, but otherwise useless to their faith.

Bell worked out an explanation of the Christian religion to address directly their questions and anxieties. He sought to use as little theological terminology as possible, reasoning that people did not despise religion for religion's sake, but that they disliked hearing a jargon-rich language which they could not understand. Encouraged by the men's predominantly positive response, he later delivered it as a series of lectures in New England before being prompted again to set it down in book form under the title The Good News. It became the bedrock of Bell's ministry, and he dedicated the remainder of his life to training men and women in the basics of the Christian religion.

=== Bard College ===
At the age of 34, Bell became the then youngest president of St. Stephen's College (now Bard College) in Annandale-on-Hudson, New York, where he would remain from 1919 to 1933. While there, he was made head of the philosophy department at Columbia University and honored with a Doctor of Letters. He published Beyond Agnosticism in 1929, which addressed common college-age doubts, with a dedication to his son, Bernard Lee, who was preparing for higher education.

==== Initial Fame and Progress ====
When Bell arrived to St. Stephen's College, the school was racked with massive debt, 29 students were enrolled, the buildings were in disrepair, and there were nine faculty members running all its programs. His wife Betty, after witnessing the overgrown campus and derelict presidential house, confessed to wondering if her husband was insane to take on the job. Bell himself admitted to accepting the position, among other reasons, in order to put an educational theory of his "on the ground". The administration hoped that Bell's recent fame and youthful energy would revive St. Stephen's, especially since Right and Wrong After the War (1918) and Work of the Church for Men at War (1919) were then some of the most discussed books in America.

According to former Bard College president Reamer Kline, "Word of the St. Stephen's educational program and its theological base was carried to outside world in one of the most phenomenal, one-man PR campaigns in the history of American religion and higher education." Before commencing the school year, Bell solicited acquaintances from the Navy, returning veterans, and brought the enrollment up to 49. He fired six faculty and personally hired a colorful assortment of professors based primarily on their "note and standing" in addition to being excellent teachers and learned men. With the help of the Board of Trustees, he doubled the size of the campus, quadrupled the budget, and built drama and athletics programs as well as one of the first sociology programs in America. All this he fueled through constant speaking engagements: appearing on college campuses, cathedrals, suburban and urban parishes, large seminars, and most effectively, national radio. It was not long before "his name became a household word to thousands of people who had never themselves set eyes on him. He was certainly the most widely known, most listened-to, and most influential American clergyman of his generation and very possibly of [the twentieth century]."

==== Prophet of Postmodernism ====
Since the 1880s, the word 'postmodern' had been used infrequently to describe movements in architecture and the visual arts. When Bell published Postmodernism and Other Essays in 1926, he reimagined and popularized the term to denote the historical era following modernity. However, the subject did not enter the academic sphere until Arnold J. Toynbee's 1939 article, "Our own Post-Modern Age has been inaugurated by the general war of 1914–1918."

The central argument of Postmodernism and Other Essays is that all aspects of Modernity––politics, religion, science, philosophy, technology, history, education––had failed and would give rise to widespread resentment and agnosticism, not only concerning God but every human authority. This would serve as the catalyst for change. The successful postmodernist would subject everything Modernity had accepted as "truth" or "reality" to rigorous questioning and thereby return to the path of Truth. The unsuccessful would remain spiritually malnourished, and vainly pursue various ends in the hopes of fulfillment. Should the latter prevail, truth would once again become subjective, and people would become historically ignorant, rudderless:

Who will pioneer if there can be found no sure approach to Truth? Who cares to blaze new trails if all trails lead alike to nowhere? If we can never know what we are or why we are, how is leadership possible? Who dares lead anybody anywhere if no one may first be sure?

One outgrowth of widespread subjective truth is the necessity of tolerance. Without it, peace is impossible among so many personal convictions. Bell believed that tolerance marked "the decay of old standards rather than formation of new ones" in civilization; the succeeding intolerance was a constructive force, though often accompanied by intellectual strife and violence. He points to the tolerance which led to "violent contentions" in ancient Rome and 18th century France as examples. Under these conditions, a person's truths might conform to the pressure of crowd sentiments––the danger being that "tolerance might destroy within us the capacity for constructive thought and determined action" and cause us to act on personal feelings and crowd-think alone. Such a society in America would likely be cynical, over-organized, bored with easily accessible pleasures, and devote itself as heartily and unthinkingly to commercialism as ancient Rome did to imperialism.

==== 1926 Student Strike ====
In March 1926, three-quarters of the student body ceased attending classes or Chapel, stating that they would do so until president Bell resigned. The strike lasted ten days until spring recess began.

For some time, student resentment had been building towards the president's high standards, his over-involvement in campus minutia, and his perceived arrogance about his achievements. In the dining commons, Bell publicly chastised several students for their conduct in Chapel. Kline speculates that he may have been more irritable and dealt more harshly that day, having recently returned from a serious operation on his thyroid. However it may be, certain students gathered signatures and submitted a petition that administration release disciplinary power to a joint committee of students and faculty. Bell ignored the petition and left for his Sunday speaking engagement at Union College, only to return to the strike.

Over the next ten days, there were faculty meetings and student gatherings, formal and informal, as well as "gossip, publicity, and newspaper articles." Bell rejected the petition outright and tried unsuccessfully to expel the students who had led the strike. His inflexibility on the matter imparted a general attitude among the students, being that Bell had made himself an obstacle and that only his resignation could end the strike.

This, however, was not to be the case. During spring recess, some of the remaining students and faculty met with the Trustees, who ultimately decided that disciplinary authority would be delegated to the pertinent party: faculty in academic matters, the bursar in financial, and the chaplain in Chapel. This arrangement seemed to resolve the issue, although enrollment fell by 27 students the next fall.

Beneath the surface, the real trouble centered around Fr. Jack Bray, the athletic director, who had been falsely endorsing tuition notes for a small group of athletes from the Sigma Alpha Epsilon fraternity. Bray, along with another liable staff member, had covertly influenced certain students to submit the petition. Looking back on the incident 25 years later, Bell wrote in a letter:

The famous 'strike' was an interesting phenomenon. It was hard to deal with, because as with most such student performances, the undergraduates were manipulated by a few unscrupulous members of the faculty. The poor boys thought that they were fighting for democracy, whereas in reality they were fighting to get rid of the president who had become dangerous to some members of the staff, and who was about to recommend the dismissal, for cause, of two of them...The Board of Trustees let it ride, and finally was able to dissolve it and show the students responsible for leading it, that they had been 'used' by the two professors. Both these men were dismissed.

==== Bernard Lee Bell ====
Bernard Lee was six years old when his father was hired to St. Stephens and the family moved from Wisconsin to New York. According to Kline, people's impressions of him ranged from "the most brilliant boy I have ever known" to "very dumb." He was unhappy in school, vacillating between in-home tutoring and attending a series of private and public institutions: Red Hook Central schools, an academy in Cornwall, Connecticut, and Choate. Nevertheless, Bell was immensely proud of him and foresaw nearly limitless potential. For instance, upon receiving a poor report card from Bernard Lee's high school, Bell wrote:

Your marks, except in Geography, are not very good but I am inclined to think that they are reasonably satisfactory with the exception of Arithmetic. In your examination you showed a good knowledge of the rules and principles of Arithmetic, according to Mr. Shrives, but ruined your paper by sheer carelessness in multiplication and division... You are like me in this, you see large principles easily but are impatient in application to details. I have always been so. When I was a boy, I was more so than you are. The study of Arithmetic and, later on, the study of Algebra and Geometry did more to break me of this carelessness and inattention to small things than all my studies put together... I am glad to know that you have a good head. A person can learn to attend to the details but a 'dumbell' can never learn to think. I am glad to know that you can think. We are looking forward to having you back home next week!

While at Choate, Bernard Lee's health mysteriously began to fail. He received several inconclusive diagnoses such as "discouragement, rheumatism, sugar in the urine, or a heart problem." The doctors cautioned him to cease competitive sports, sleep on the first floor of his dormitory, get a full night's rest, and carefully restrict his diet. However, none of these worked; his health continued to affect his studies, and he was sent home. For his final year of life, he studied under private tutors–mostly faculty from St. Stephen's–and was considering a career in medicine. Then he died unexpectedly four days after contracting meningitis. He was 17 years old. Bell claimed that there were "two blows from which he never recovered": the student strike of 1926 and his son's death in 1930. In a letter to a friend, Bell wrote:

It seemed to me at first that I could not bear his going. He was more than a son to me. He was an understanding friend such as I shall never have again...His life judged by quality rather than by quantity of achievement, was a true success, and for what more can a parent ask? And is there much difference in the light of Eternity between living seventeen years and living seventy? I am quite sure that nothing in God's economy is wasted, and I know that his great abilities are being put to use in ways that are more fruitful than possible for us who labor here, hampered and thwarted on every side. I cannot grieve that the boy is dead, —but I am most horribly lonely at times, for all that.

==== Resignation ====
After Bernard Lee's death, tensions between Bell and the Board of Trustees came to a head.

Despite his success in improving the college's standing, it was still short of funding when the Great Depression hit in 1929. The Trustees pressured Bell, who was already in the habit of overextending his presidential role, to add to it that of financier. He found various ways to enroll more students from diverse backgrounds and improve existing programs in the social and natural sciences. It was not enough. They asked him to focus primarily on obtaining donations and forgo teaching, though he believed teaching necessary to stay in touch with students' and professors' needs. At the college's most desperate, a telegram with then-Governor and Trustee Franklin D. Roosevelt's signature was sent out to ten of America's ten wealthiest entrepreneurs containing a plea for support. There was no response.

Meanwhile, American education was trending towards the progressive philosophy of John Dewey. However, St. Stephen's was under complete control of the Episcopal Church; and since his arrival, Bell had been conforming the campus to his own brand of classically inspired Anglo-Catholic education. He had very high academic and social standards for manners, professional dress, sportsmanship, and attitude toward studies. One student claimed, "I would say that 90% of us went on to graduate studies upon graduation. He expected that of us." One of his most contested rules – informed by his military days – was that students must pay respect to the professor by standing to attention when he entered the room. This was eventually overruled due to pressure from both parents and the Board, because it engendered 'elitism.' Over the years, incidents like this continued, much to the stress of Bell and the Board.

On May 26, 1933, Dr. Donald Tewksbury from Columbia University was quietly appointed Acting Dean of St. Stephen's College. Four days later Bell was notified. The two sat down to discuss arrangements, coming to a terse agreement that "it was of the utmost importance... to maintain a satisfactory student body." Bell stepped down and Tewksbury took his place. Under Tewksbury's leadership, the college established an arts-based, progressive curriculum, severed its relationship with the church, and was renamed Bard College after its founder.

==== Legacy and the "Curse" ====
Subsequently, there arose a rumor that Bell had cursed Bard College for apostatizing from the Episcopal Church. As the legend goes, he penned a Commination in the chapel service book and stained it in either blood or ink before departing, never to return. However, the story is somewhat more complicated. On June 29, 1933, Bell officiated chapel for the last time before a small group of seven people. He regularly used purple ink with a quill pen, and on this occasion signed off:

With this service, I, Bernard Iddings Bell, completed my fourteen years as Warden of this College, convinced that it is the will of God that I go elsewhere in God's Kingdom and persuaded that it is probably not the will of God that the College survive; grateful for many masses offered at this altar and for visions of God's mercy and pity granted me here; commending to Him and to Our Lady my son who here made his first Communion and whose body is buried from this Church; and with the giving of the College and all who here have lived and worked into the hands of SS. Peter and Paul, our Holy Lady Mary, St. Stephen the patron; the Holy Innocents, St. Edward the Confessor (my own patron) — the little brother Francis, that they may ever pray as I do, a poor priest, for this College to the most blessed Trinity. Pax!

When he had finished writing, Bell accidentally caught the ink bottle with the edge of the service book, thereby soaking at least fifteen pages. The stained book can be viewed today in the Bardiana room in the library. The origin of this "curse" likely stems from the note's supposition that "it is probably not the will of God that the College survive." However, it can be seen that the vast majority of the paragraph is dedicated in prayer for God and his saints to intercede for it.

It is true that Bell never set foot on campus again. However, he was witnessed periodically through the window by an administrative officer, who saw Bell parking his car on the edge of the highway and crossing the field to visit his son's grave.

=== Later Years and Death ===
Bell was made canon of both St. John's Cathedral in Providence, Rhode Island and the Cathedral of Saints Peter and Paul in Chicago, as well as a William Vaughn Moody Lecturer at the University of Chicago. He continued to lecture, write, travel, and pastor students. While completing Crowd Culture: An Examination of the American Way of Life (1952), his health began to decline. He retired in 1954. Diagnosed with acute glaucoma, he was completely blind in his final years. In a letter to Russell Kirk dated Feb. 3 1956, he wrote:

It was good to get your letter. I find that when one is blind one misses one's friends.

You ask if I am doing any writing. The answer is "almost none"... It is not that this new job of mine is impossibly onerous. Far from it. My complaint is the other way about. If and when you come to see me, which I do hope will not be too far hence, I can tell you what it feels like to go into low gear when one has always stepped on the accelerator...

I find that I write slowly and badly by machine and handwriting is out of the question. Once in a while I can afford to get somebody in to write what I want to say but that is rather an expensive matter.

Undaunted, he continued teaching and traveling about the United States, even sailing to England to fulfil a two-month lecture engagement that year. Upon returning, his doctors insisted that he "take it easy and rest, at least until the early Autumn." He died in Chicago two years later. He is buried alongside his son in the Bard College Cemetery in the same grave as his wife, who died in 1985 at the age of 98.

== Personality ==
Bell was known to students and faculty at Bard College as "B.I." In public, he was always immaculately groomed and dressed in clerical clothing. He wore a long black cape rather than a coat, which was unusual for the time period. Reporters tended to compare his appearance to that of an owl or bulldog. Despite being roughly 5' 5" tall, the presence of his personality has been universally described as huge, energetic, formidable: a force of nature. He was known for having strong, heavily researched opinions, holding High Church sensibilities, and being "broad-minded" when listening to others. He corresponded with and offered guidance to many influential figures of the day such as Maisie Ward, Alan Watts, T.S. Eliot, Peter Viereck, Dorothy Thompson, and Russell Kirk. Naturally, he was divisive among students and colleagues, who either loved or hated him depending on their own beliefs, attitudes, and opinions.

== Views ==
=== Science v. Religion ===
Due to his college presidency and frequent university lectures, Bell was acquainted with many prominent scientists of the day. He maintained the catholic position that while science is distinct from religion, the two are interdependent. One can neither prove, disprove, nor pose authority over the other, yet both are necessary means of drawing a more intimate portrait of Reality. He cited the long line of great scientists as being predominantly religious: Charles Darwin, Roger Bacon, Pierre Simon Laplace, John Dalton, Antoine Lavoisier, Werner Heisenberg, Pierre Teilhard de Chardin, Georges Lemaître, Luigi Aloisio Galvani, Galileo Galilei, Robert Boyle, Michael Faraday, Louis Pasteur, Lord Kelvin, and Robert A. Millikin. "There is in me no rebellion against science," he remarked, "only gratitude for all that by it we have learned or yet may learn."

According to Bell, the conflict is due to a degradation of science and religion, propagated by the conceit of "demi-educated" scientists and theologians. During the Renaissance and Enlightenment, the natural relationship between science and religion was severed, resulting in scientific materialism and religious fundamentalism. These he considered "logical suicide," because each took an unfounded premise to its extreme logical end. Materialistic science denied all non-measurable realities, and thus the inner life of humans—love, creative expression, beauty, and goodness—were reduced to behavior theory, biochemical reactions, mere neurons firing. Religious fundamentalism, on the other hand, attempted to stifle scientific evidence in order to preserve Victorian sentiments associated with the Bible.

=== Mysticism v. Magic ===
Most great scientists and theologians will admit that the more one learns, the more one becomes aware of his or her ignorance. For as one comes closer to the Truth, in both the natural and spiritual realms, the evidence begins to "unravel" with such limitless complexity that human comprehension falls short. This is the point at which human reason, even language, breaks down and one becomes conscious of the existence of a non-demonstrable Reality, a mystery. A mystic is one who pursues that mystery, whose evidence supersedes reason, and seeks to align him or herself with it. Bell considers mysticism to be synonymous with sanity.

Magic is the selfish belief that one can coerce or alter Reality into getting the things that he or she cannot get for him or herself. Bell calls magic the "bastard brother" of mysticism, explaining that in the same way an artist can paint in order to manifest Beauty, so another artist can paint "because he is a conceited ass and loves applause." In short, magic is bad religion, bad science, bad art.

=== Agnosticism ===
Bell held that agnosticism was an important intellectual period during which one rigorously questioned the values, beliefs, and attitudes of the present age, even going so far as to claim that all intelligent Christianity is based upon it. The following thesis explains the personal, philosophical reasons by which he had become a theist and then a Christian.

1. Scientific data, observed by human senses and processed by human reason, is insufficient for discovering Truth. Modern peoples' underlying anxiety is the result of dependence upon such incomplete data for innovating technology and infrastructure. Our ability to reason is not a way to discover Truth but rather a way to organize our knowledge and experiences somewhat sensibly. Without a full, human perception of the world, one's reason tends to lead them in the wrong direction.
2. Beyond what can be measured with scientific tools, there are two other types of perception: one's ability to communicate inner truths through creative expression and one's ability to "read" another person and find harmony with them, which we call love. One's loves cannot be dissected and logged in a scientific journal, but we know them far better than we know the surface of the sun. They show us an undefinable reality that is nevertheless intimate and personal, and they reveal qualities lovelier and truer than sensory facts can provide.
3. Reality, as experienced by humans, must be understood through all three ways of knowing: science, creative expression, and love. Only by experiencing this Reality as a person can we come closer to the Truth, for an ultimate Person can be loved, but a cosmic force cannot. A scientist can discover peripheral, material truths, but a lover is able to get at the Truth.
4. There are many reasons to believe in God, but they are not sufficient to convince an agnostic. It is not enough to believe in an ancient holy book, even though when it is accurately analyzed without bias, it proves to be more trustworthy and admirable than what one is taught in school. Neither is it enough to realize how probable it is that a personal God would have to show human beings how to live, considering they have so much trouble on their own. Nor is it enough to believe for the reason that, throughout history, millions of people have known Reality only through religious experience. The aforementioned reasons may warm one toward religion, but they fall short. However, if one presupposes that God is in fact a knowable, loving person, as an experiment, and then lives according that religion, he or she will suddenly come face to face with experiences previously unknown. One's life becomes full, meaningful, and fearless in the face of death. It does not defy reason but exceeds it.
5. Because God has been experienced through love, the orders of prayer, fellowship, and devotion now matter. They create order within one's life, continually renewing the "missing piece" that had previously felt lost. They empower one to be compassionate and humble, not small-minded or arrogant.
6. No truth should be denied outright, but all should be questioned on the scale of evidence. Science reveals an ever-growing vision of our universe that should not be discounted due to bias toward older understandings. Reason is to be trusted and cultivated. To believe in God is not to forego reason or to deny scientific facts, but to venture into the unknown and discover for oneself what is True.

== Selected works ==
- Right and Wrong After the War: An Elementary Consideration of Christian Morals in the Light of Modern Social Problems (1918)
- The Church's Work for Men at War (1919)
- The Good News (1921)
- Postmodernism and Other Essays (1926)
- Common Sense in Education (1928)
- Beyond Agnosticism: A Book for Tired Mechanists (1929)
- Unfashionable Convictions (1931)
- Men Wanted! (1933)
- Holy Week (1933)
- Preface to Religion (1935)
- A Catholic Looks at His World: An Approach to Christian Sociology (1936)
- O Men of God! (1936)
- Affirmations by a Group of American Anglo-Catholics (1938), editor
- In the City of Confusion (1938)
- The Priestly Way (1938)
- Religion for Living: A Book for Postmodernists (1940)
- Understanding Religion: An Introductory Guide to the Study of Christianity (1941)
- Still Shine the Stars (1941)
- The Church in Disrepute (1943)
- The Altar and the World: Social Implications of the Liturgy (1944)
- God Is Not Dead (1945)
- Man Can Live (1947)
- Crisis in Education: A Challenge to American Complacency (1949)
- Crowd Culture: An Examination of the American Way of Life (1952)
