= William L. Stevens =

The Right Reverend William Louis Stevens D.D., D.C.L.
- Bishop of Fond du Lac
- Church: Episcopal Church
- Diocese: Fond du Lac
- Elected: May 9, 1980
- In office: 1980–1994
- Predecessor: William H. Brady
- Successor: Russell Jacobus
- Previous post: Coadjutor Bishop of Fond du Lac (1980)

Orders
- Ordination: January 1957 by Karl M. Block
- Consecration: September 7, 1980 by John Allin

Personal details
- Born: January 12, 1932 Yuba City, California, United States
- Died: November 4, 1997 (aged 65) Plantation, Florida, United States
- Buried: St Benedict's Memorial Garden, Plantation, Florida
- Denomination: Anglican
- Parents: Ralph Fremont Stevens & Elsie Mae Schultz
- Education: San Francisco State University; General Theological Seminary

William Louis Stevens (January 12, 1932 – November 4, 1997) was a bishop in the United States Episcopal Church.

== Early life ==
William Louis Stevens was born in Yuba City, California, on January 12, 1932. He received a Bachelor of Arts degree from San Francisco State University in 1953 then attended and General Theological Seminary, New York, where in 1956 he received a Bachelor of Sacred Theology degree.

== Priesthood ==
The Rt. Rev. Karl M. Block, Bishop of California, ordained Stevens a Deacon in 1956 and a priest in 1957. Stevens then served congregations in San Francisco, and London, England. Stevens then became Vicar of St. Benedict's Episcopal Church, Plantation, Florida, in 1961, leading the congregation from mission to parish status. He also became a novice in the Order of the Holy Cross. From 1961 to 1980 he held numerous positions of responsibility in the community and the Diocese of Southeast Florida, including President of the Standing Committee and Chairman of the Liturgical Commission. As a parish priest he was especially sought out for his wise spiritual counsel and personal pastoral ability.

== Episcopate ==
Stevens was consecrated the sixth bishop of Fond du Lac on September 7, 1980. He was an Anglo Catholic who knew the history of the diocese he was called to serve. As Bishop, he led the diocese in spiritual renewal, emphasized religious education, and strengthened personal and corporate Christian commitment. As a preacher, he was skilled at bringing theological concepts to life: complex ideas were made clear by stories and examples. As Bishop, he took his role as teacher seriously. Always compassionate, he wanted to make sure his hearers understood that theology helped them live more Christian lives. While her adapted to the climate of Wisconsin, he stoically endured poor health during many of his 14 years in the diocese.

Bishop Stevens was the recipient of two honorary doctorates in 1981; a Doctor of Divinity from General Theological Seminary and Doctor of Canon Law from Nashotah House. Stevens served as President of the Board of Trustees of Nashotah House Theological Seminary. He served as Episcopal Visitor for the Order of St. Benedict in Two Rivers, Michigan, and the Sisters of the Holy Nativity in Fond du Lac, Wisconsin. For Bishop Stevens, this wasn't merely a pro forma relationship. He spent much time at the Mother House, and the Sisters became a second family to him. He served as Chairman of the House of Bishops Commission on Religious Communities and was on the Board of Directors of the national organization of Episcopalians for Life. He was enrolled as a life member of the Confraternity of the Blessed Sacrament on April 11, 1983.

Ecumenism was a strong interest of Stevens. He built up the diocese's relationship with Wisconsin LARCUM (Lutheran-Anglican-Roman Catholic-United Methodist) and with EDEO (Episcopal Diocesan Ecumenical Officers) and signed an expansive covenant with the local Roman Catholic Diocese and ELCA Lutheran Synod. Those associated with him, with his most conservative views, were often surprised to hear him exhort ecumenists to “just get on with it,” without splitting theological hairs. Though conservative himself, Bishop Stevens made it his mission to establish a climate open to diversity of opinion, one which would not lead to polarization among those of opposing views. A modest, unassuming man, he treated everyone with unfailing courtesy and was a sympathetic listener. He expected his clergy and people to handle differences with tolerance and good manners. Those who worked with him soon perceived just how much he hated loud arguments, or hectoring language. His sermons often proclaimed that the Church on earth was “a hospital for sinners,” lest people forget that there would always be disagreement, mistakes, human mess. His participation in numerous devotional societies expressed his conviction that prayer was vital to the life of any Christian body.

He returned to Plantation, Florida following his retirement in January, 1994. William Louis Stevens died November 4, 1997, after a two-year struggle with the results of a debilitating stroke. A requiem mass was held at St. Benedict's Church, Plantation, Florida. His cremated remains are buried in St. Benedict's Memorial Garden. A Memorial Service was held at the Cathedral of St. Paul the Apostle in Fond du Lac.

== Notes ==
Episcopal Church (USA) titles
Preceded by William Hampton Brady	6th Bishop of Fond du Lac; 1980-1994	Succeeded by Russell Edward Jacobus
