= Episcopal Diocese of Fond du Lac =

Diocese of the Episcopal Church in the United States

Coordinates: 45°00′N 89°00′W

Diocese of Fond du Lac Diœcesis Fundi Lacusensis

Location
- Country: United States
- Territory: Northeastern third of Wisconsin
- Ecclesiastical province: Province V
- Deaneries: 3 active

Statistics
- Congregations: 32 (2022)
- Members: 3,503 (2022)

Information
- Established: October 7, 1874
- Dissolved: June 28, 2024
- Cathedral: St Paul's Cathedral

Map
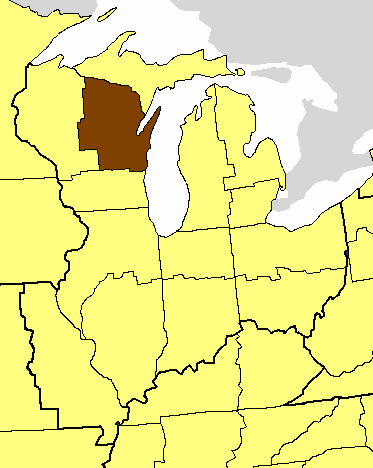
- Location of the Diocese of Fond du Lac

Website
- diofdl.org

The Diocese of Fond du Lac was a diocese of the Episcopal Church in the United States of America, encompassing the northeastern third of Wisconsin. The diocese contained about 3,800 baptized members worshiping in 33 locations. It was part of Province 5 (the upper Midwest). Diocesan offices were in Appleton, Wisconsin as were the diocesan Archives. Matthew Gunter was its final bishop. On May 4, 2024, the diocese voted to be disestablish itself and reintegrate into the Diocese of Wisconsin.

== History ==
In 1822, Oneida Indians settled ten miles from Green Bay around Duck Creek after removing from New York state. The first non-Roman Catholic church building erected in the Northwest Territory and what became Wisconsin was built by the Oneidas.

When the First Annual Council of the Diocese of Wisconsin met in Milwaukee in 1847, there were only three parishes in the northeastern part of the Wisconsin territory: Hobart Church, Duck Creek (now Church of the Holy Apostles, Oneida), Christ Church, Green Bay, and Grace Church, Sheboygan. With population growth spurred by the abundance of excellent waterways and shipping facilities in the northeastern part of the state, the Diocese of Wisconsin realized a need to create a new Diocese.

After a process begun in 1866 and completed by action of the General Convention of the Episcopal Church held in the city of New York, October 7, 1874, the Diocese of Fond du Lac was erected from the Fond du Lac Deanery of the Diocese of Wisconsin. In 1870, Fond du Lac was the second largest city in Wisconsin. The remaining counties continued as the Diocese of Wisconsin until 1888, when it was renamed the Diocese of Milwaukee.

In 1875, after three elections, John Henry Hobart Brown accepted election as first bishop and was consecrated December 15, 1875 at St. John's Episcopal Church, Cohoes, New York. Brown declared the city of Fond du Lac and St. Paul's Church as the episcopal See. The other viable location was Christ Church, Green Bay, but one likely reason Fond du Lac was chosen is it was a 'free-church' and Christ Church, Green Bay still had pew rents.

After a tremendous growth and laying the foundation of the newly erected Diocese, its second bishop, Charles Chapman Grafton, one of the leaders of the Oxford Movement and its third, Reginald Heber Weller, continued to build on the successes of those who came before them.

Growth, time, and distance led to the erection of a third Wisconsin Diocese. The Diocese of Fond du Lac established its current boundaries when the Diocese of Eau Claire was created in out of counties of both the Diocese of Milwaukee and Diocese of Fond du Lac in 1928, immediately prior to the onset of the Great Depression. On October 22, 2011, the Diocese of Fond du Lac and the Diocese of Eau Claire voted to "junction" into one diocese but Russell Jacobus, Bishop of Fond du Lac, withheld his consent due to the closeness and irregularities of the vote.

Since its founding in 1875, the Diocese of Fond du Lac has seen congregations come and go, often paralleling the coming and going of the population as towns, villages and cities sprung up and sometimes disappeared with economic opportunities of the area. Some congregations have established themselves deeply in communities and others have closed after many decades of sharing the Gospel. The past two decades have experienced the same decline in members felt by many main-line denominations. Through it all, there have been people of faith in the Anglican and Episcopal tradition who have worshipped God through the liturgies of the Church tracing their roots to the first Apostles and primarily Anglo-Catholic in nature.

In 2021 it was announced that the diocese of Fond du Lac, Eau Claire, and Milwaukee would contemplate entering an agreement of greater collaboration. With around 4,000 baptized members, Fond du Lac was among the Episcopal Church's smaller dioceses. In October 2021 it was announced that the three diocese would be actively pursuing reuniting as one diocese in Wisconsin. On May 4, 2024, all three dioceses approved the "Joint Agreement of Union," which required approval at the Episcopal Church's General Convention in June. On June 28, the 81st General Convention of The Episcopal Church approved the merger of the Dioceses of Fond du Lac, Eau Claire, and Milwaukee into one diocese, the Diocese of Wisconsin.

== Cathedral ==
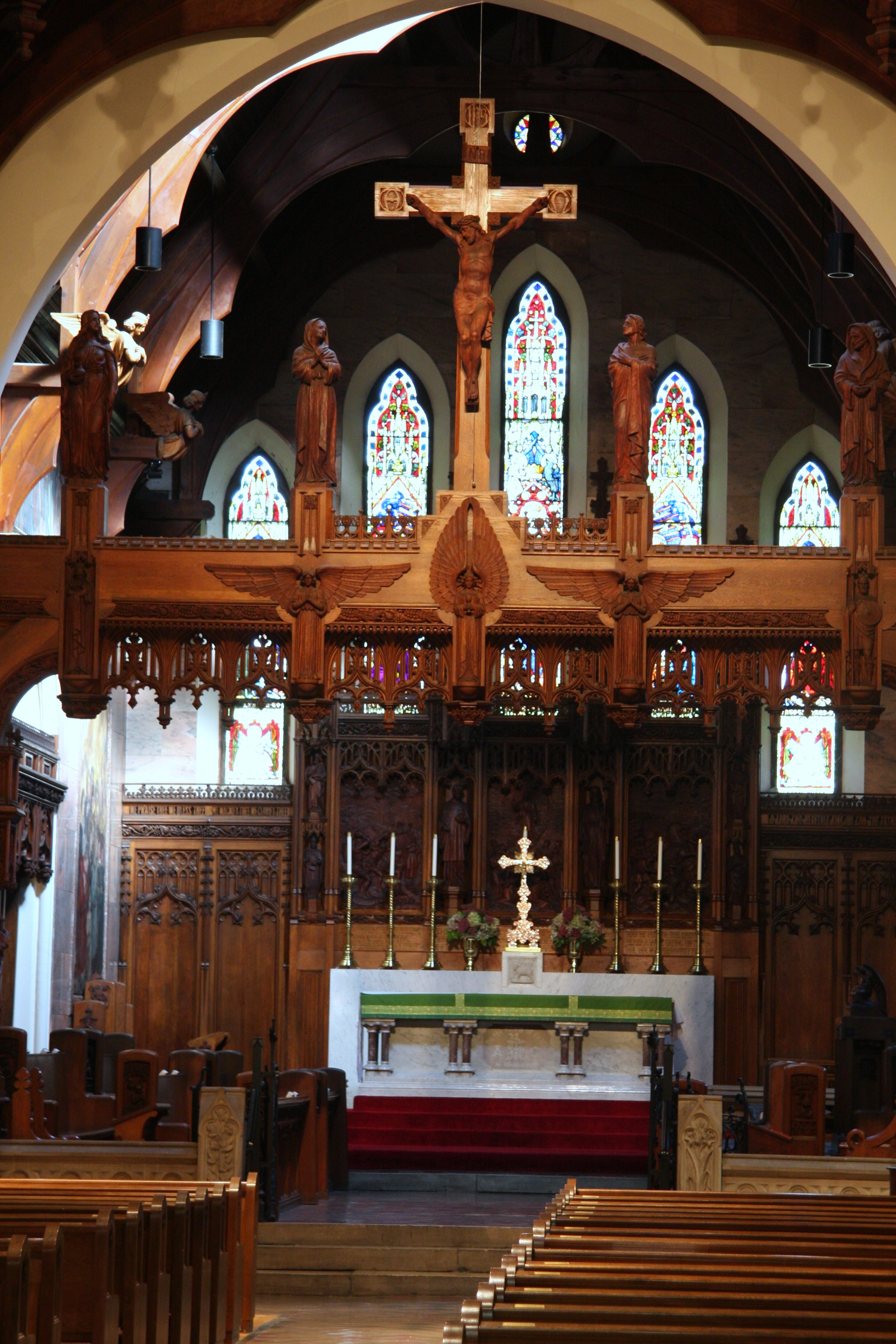
The cathedral interior

The episcopal see is at Fond du Lac, Wisconsin. The Cathedral Church of St. Paul the Apostle, having been chosen by the first Bishop of Fond du Lac, John Henry Hobart Brown, and confirmed by Article in the diocesan constitution. The congregation was formed in 1848 and built a stone building at its current location in 1866. In 1884 this stone building burned and was replaced with the present structure.

Much of the interior of the cathedral is a credit to the effort of the second bishop, Charles Chapman Grafton. There are outstanding examples of late Victorian ecclesiastical art including woodcarvings from the workshop of Balthasar Schmitt, a German artisan who emigrated to the US for the job, the Fond du Lac Church Furnishings Company, and the Svoboda Church Furniture Company of Kewaunee, Wisconsin. The frontal on the St. Augustine chapel altar is an exquisite piece of color-infused marble. The stained glass is by Robert L. Jacoby and the Canadian John Spence Company.

== Notable congregations of the diocese ==
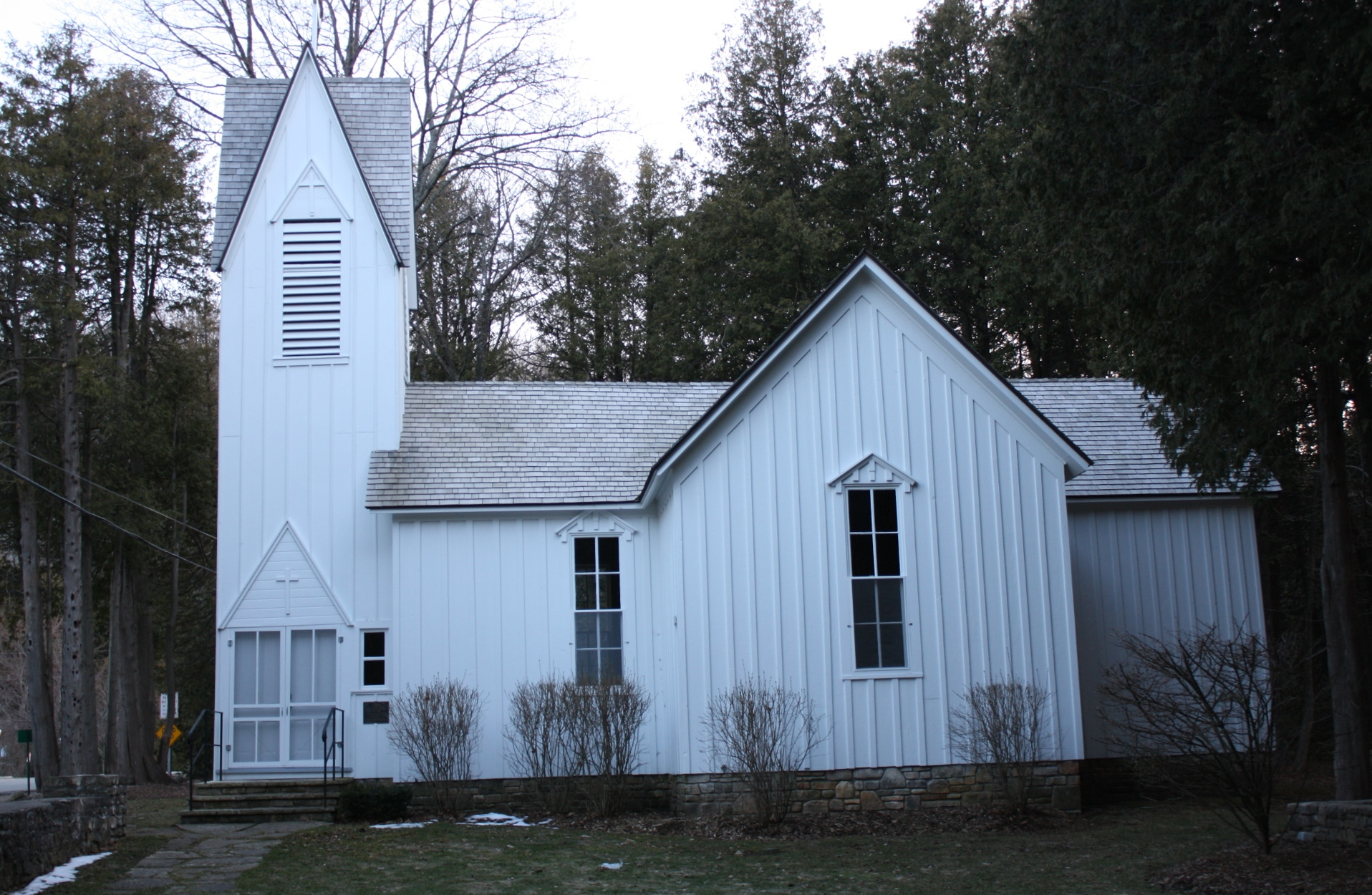
Church of the Atonement in Fish Creek

- Algoma - St Agnes Episcopal Church
- Appleton - All Saints Episcopal Church
- Fish Creek - Church of the Atonement
- Fond du Lac - Cathedral Church of St Paul
- Manitowoc - St. James' Episcopal Church
- Menasha - St. Thomas Episcopal Church
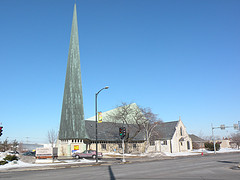
  St. Thomas, Neenah-Menasha
- Oneida - Church of the Holy Apostles
- Oshkosh - Trinity Episcopal Church
- Ripon - St. Peter's Episcopal Church

== Bishops ==
These are the bishops who served the Diocese of Wisconsin, prior to erection of the Diocese of Fond du Lac.

1. Jackson Kemper (1847–70)
2. William Edmond Armitage (1870–73)
3. Edward Randolph Welles (1874–88)

These are the bishops who served the Diocese of Fond du Lac:

1. John Henry Hobart Brown (1875–1888)
2. Charles Chapman Grafton (1889–1912)
  * Reginald Heber Weller, Coadjutor Bishop (consecrated 1900)
3. Reginald Heber Weller (1912–1933)
  * Harwood Sturtevant, Coadjutor Bishop (consecrated 1929)
4. Harwood Sturtevant (1933–1956)
  * William Hampton Brady, Coadjutor Bishop (consecrated 1953)
5. William Hampton Brady (1956–1980)
6. William Louis Stevens (1980–1994)
7. Russell Edward Jacobus (1994-2013)
8. Matthew Alan Gunter (2014-2024)

== See also ==
- Sisterhood of the Holy Nativity
- List of bishops of the Episcopal Church in the United States of America
