= John Henry Hobart Brown =

19th-century American Episcopal bishop

The Right Reverend John Henry Hobart Brown
- Bishop of Fond du Lac
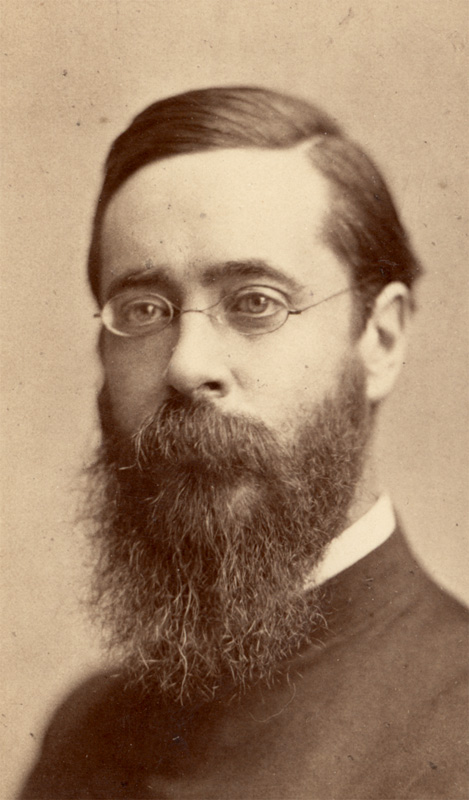
- Church: Episcopal Church
- Diocese: Fond du Lac
- Elected: September 15, 1875
- In office: 1875–1888
- Successor: Charles Chapman Grafton

Orders
- Ordination: December 1, 1855 by Horatio Potter
- Consecration: December 15, 1875 by Horatio Potter

Personal details
- Born: December 1, 1831 New York City, United States
- Died: May 2, 1888 (aged 56) Fond du Lac, Wisconsin, United States
- Buried: St. Paul's Cathedral (Fond du Lac, Wisconsin)
- Denomination: Anglican
- Spouse: Anna Coombs Upjohn
- Children: 2
- Education: General Theological Seminary

John Henry Hobart Brown (called Hobart; December 1, 1831 – May 2, 1888) was the first bishop of the Diocese of Fond du Lac in the Episcopal Church.

== Early life ==
Brown was born on December 1, 1831, in New York City. After theological studies at the General Theological Seminary, New York, he was ordained to the diaconate in Trinity Church, New York on April 2, 1854, by Bishop Jonathan Mayhew Wainwright. The following year he was ordained to the priesthood at the Church of the Holy Communion, New York, on December 1, 1855, by Bishop Horatio Potter.

In 1854, Brown served as assistant in Grace Church, Brooklyn, Long Island, and while there organized the Church of the Good Angels, (now Emmanuel Church,) Brooklyn, of which he became rector. In 1856 he became rector of the Church of the Evangelists, (old S. George's Chapel,) Beekman Street, New York. In 1863, he became rector of St. John's Church, Cohoes, New York.

During his priesthood, Brown served as secretary to the diocesan convention of Albany and as archdeacon of the Albany Convocation. He received the honorary degree of Doctor of Sacred Theology from Racine College in 1874.

== Episcopate ==
Brown was elected bishop of the newly organized Diocese of Fond du Lac, which covered the northeastern third of Wisconsin, created out of the Diocese of Wisconsin. Brown was consecrated the first bishop of the Episcopal Diocese of Fond du Lac on December 15, 1875, at Cohoes, New York by Bishops Horatio Potter, Henry Augustus Bissell, William Croswell Doane, William Woodruff Mies, Benjamin Henry Paddock, Edward Randolph Welles, and John Scarborough.

Brown lived up to the challenge of serving a diocese that had been carved out of the wilderness. According to a history of the diocese "The Council addresses of Bishop Brown, read in the light of later years, are wonderful examples of the conceptions he had of his high office. He did not shirk to speak the truth. He seemed to have grasped the needs of his clergy, and the difficulties of his diocese which they had to face."

During his episcopate, Brown established St. Paul's in Fond du Lac as his see city, set the groundwork for the establishment of a diocesan girls school, found a religious order, the Order of St. Moinica, shifting those congregations who still had pew rents to be "free churches", and worked to reach out to some disaffected groups of the Roman Catholic Church, especially in trying to work with René Villette.

== Personal life and death ==
Brown married Anna Coombs Upjohn (1837-1917) on July 29, 1856 at Garrison-on-the-Hudson, New York. Upjohn was the youngest daughter of British-born architect Richard Upjohn, who the following year helped found and became the first president of the American Institute of Architects. They had two adopted daughters, Jane Campbell and Clementine Boem. Brown died of typhoid pneumonia in Fond du Lac on May 2, 1888, and is buried in the churchyard of St. Paul's Cathedral.

== See also ==
- List of Succession of Bishops for the Episcopal Church, USA

== Sources ==
- A Sketch-book of the American Episcopate, Third Edition, by Hermon Griswold Batterson, (Philadelphia: J.B. Lippincott Company. 1895.)
- The Episcopate in America, by William Stevens Perry, (New York: The Christian Literature Company. 1895.)
- The History of Fond du Lac County, Wisconsin, (Chicago: Western Historical Company. 1880.)

Episcopal Church (USA) titles
Preceded by None	1st Bishop of Fond du Lac; 15 December 1875 – 2 May 1888	Succeeded by Charles Chapman Grafton
