= Church of the Atonement (Fish Creek, Wisconsin) =

Historic church in Wisconsin, United States

- Church of the Atonement Episcopal Fish Creek, Wisconsin
- U.S. National Register of Historic Places
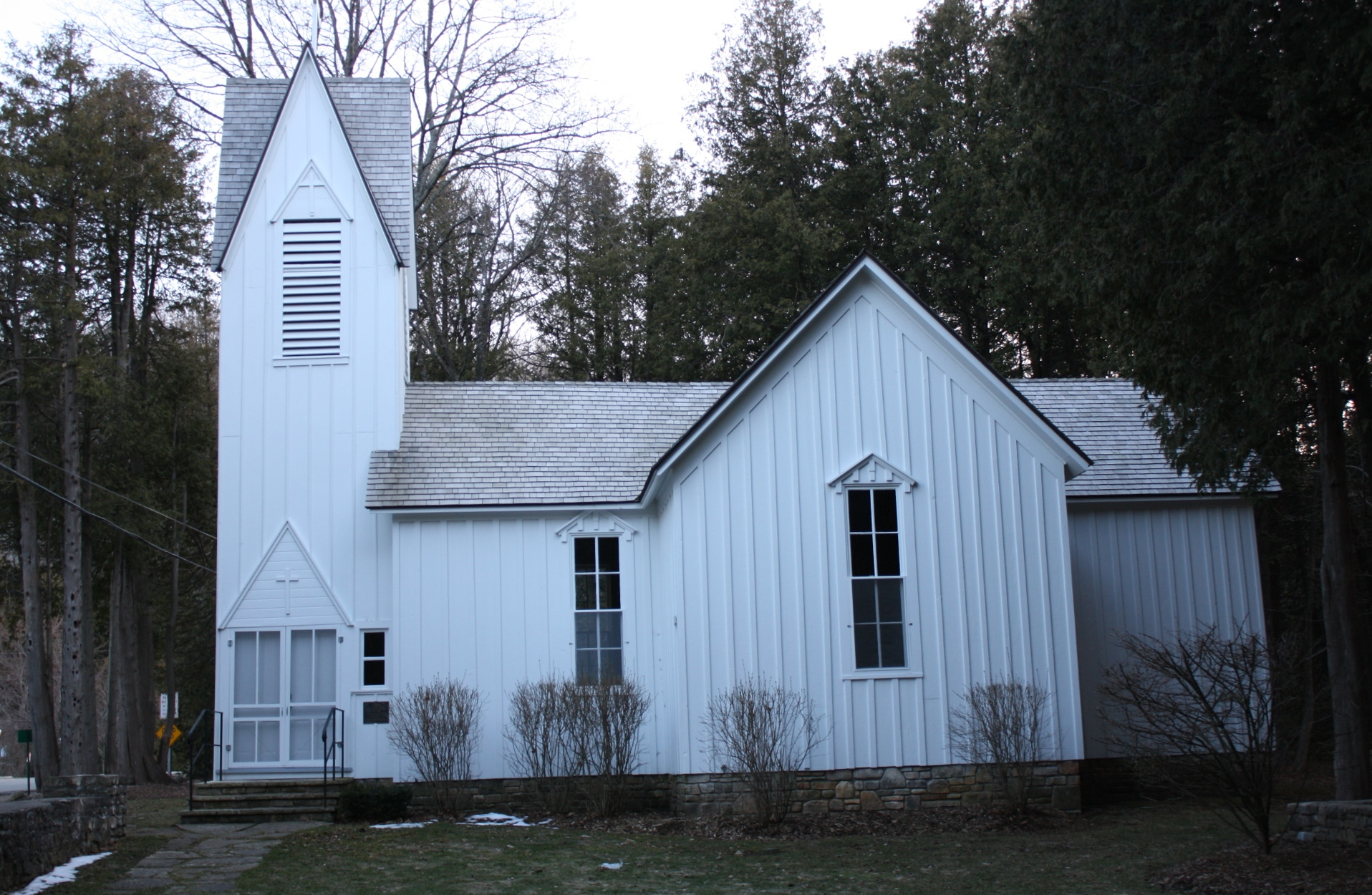
- Location: Main Street and Cottage Row; Fish Creek, Wisconsin
- Coordinates: 45.12809°N 87.24942°W
- Built: 1896
- NRHP reference No.: 85000487
- Added to NRHP: March 7, 1985

Church of the Atonement, is an historic Carpenter Gothic Episcopal summer chapel in Fish Creek, Wisconsin, within the Episcopal Diocese of Wisconsin. On March 7, 1985, it was added to the National Register of Historic Places. It was formerly in the jurisdiction of the Episcopal Diocese of Fond du Lac.

== History ==
The church was built in 1878 on the foundation of a fisherman's unfinished house, with lumber donated by Mrs. L. M. Griswold, wife of a local sawmill owner. The style is Carpenter Gothic, with exterior of board and batten and wood shingles.

The congregation initially had twenty members, led by Mrs. Griswold and Sara Jeffcoat, a widowed schoolteacher. Early on the congregation was served by Reverend Joseph Jameson who was shared with congregations at Jacksonport, Algoma and Sturgeon Bay.

In 1985 the building was added to the National Register of Historic Places for its religious and architectural significance.

Today the church offers worship services in summer only, because the building remains unheated. Rotating clergy serve each Sunday morning.

== See also ==
- List of Registered Historic Places in Wisconsin
