= St. Peter's Episcopal Church (Ripon, Wisconsin) =

Historic church in Wisconsin, United States

- U.S. National Register of Historic Places
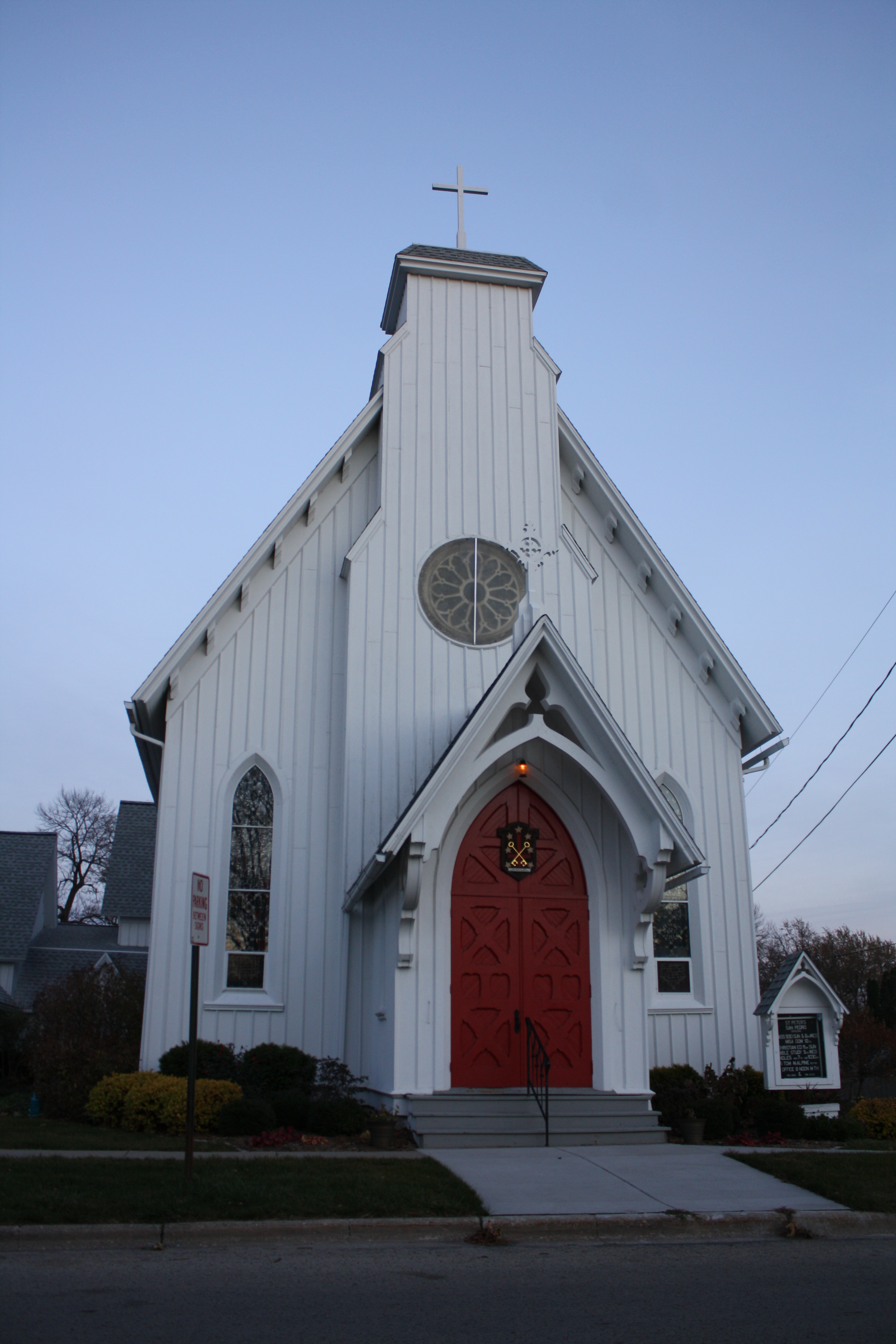
- St. Peter's Episcopal Church
- Location: 217 Houston St. Ripon, Wisconsin
- Coordinates: 43.84431°N 88.83504°W
- Built: 1860
- Architectural style: Carpenter Gothic
- NRHP reference No.: 74000089
- Added to NRHP: December 31, 1974

St. Peter's Episcopal Church is a parish of the Episcopal Church in Ripon, Wisconsin, in the Episcopal Diocese of Wisconsin. The parish also operates a chapel of ease, St Mary's, in Wautoma. Both were formerly in the jurisdiction of the Episcopal Diocese of Fond du Lac.

In 2017, the church reported 121 members; in 2023, it reported 102 members. No membership statistics were reported in 2024 national parochial reports. Plate and pledge financial support reported by the church in 2024 was $102,760. Average Sunday Attendance ASA reported in 2024 was 25 persons. This was a relative decrease on ASA of 54 in 2017.

The church building was added to the National Register of Historic Places for its architectural significance in 1974.
