= Charles Chapman Grafton =

American bishop

The Right Reverend Charles Chapman Grafton SSJE
- Bishop of Fond du Lac
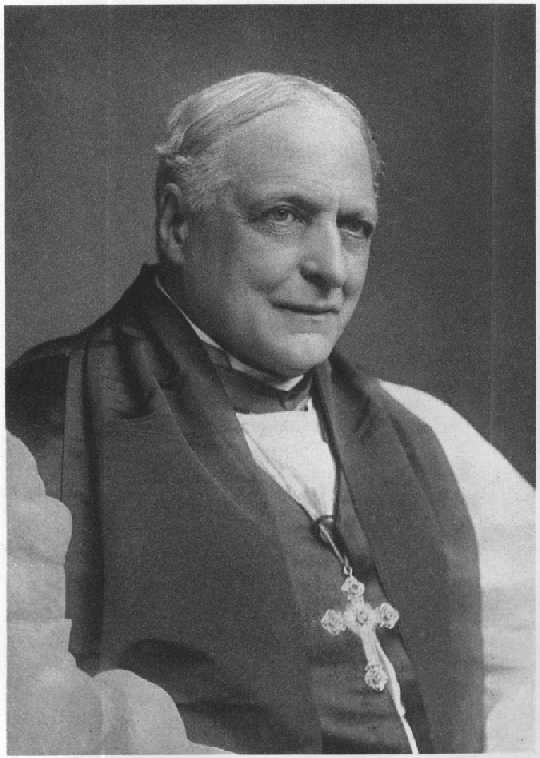
- Church: Episcopal Church
- Diocese: Fond du Lac
- Elected: November 13, 1888
- In office: 1889–1912
- Predecessor: John Henry Hobart Brown
- Successor: Reginald Heber Weller

Orders
- Ordination: May 30, 1858 by William Rollinson Whittingham
- Consecration: April 25, 1889 by William Edward McLaren

Personal details
- Born: April 12, 1830 Boston, Massachusetts, United States
- Died: August 30, 1912 (aged 82) Fond du Lac, Wisconsin, United States
- Buried: St. Paul's Cathedral (Fond du Lac, Wisconsin)
- Denomination: Anglican
- Parents: Joseph Grafton & Anna Maria Gurley
- Education: Harvard University

Charles Chapman Grafton SSJE (April 12, 1830 – August 30, 1912) was the second Episcopal Bishop of Fond du Lac, Wisconsin.

== Early life and education ==
Born on April 12, 1830, in Boston, Massachusetts, he became an ardent supporter of the Oxford Movement, an affiliation of High Church Anglicans that led to Anglo-Catholicism in The Episcopal Church.

A graduate of Phillips Academy, Andover in 1846, in 1853 Grafton graduated from Harvard University with a degree in law, but he found himself drawn toward the ordained ministry. Grafton studied theology under William Whittingham, Bishop of Maryland, and was ordained deacon on Dec. 23, 1855.

== Priesthood ==
Grafton began his ordained ministry as assistant at Reisterstown, Maryland. On May 30, 1858, he was ordained priest. He then served as curate at St. Paul's Episcopal Church in Baltimore and chaplain of the deaconesses of the Episcopal Diocese of Maryland.

At the close of the Civil War, Grafton went to Britain. With Richard Meux Benson and Simeon Wilberforce O'Neill he co-founded the Society of St. John the Evangelist (SSJE), also known as the Cowley Fathers.

Grafton returned to the United States and, in 1872, became fourth rector of the Church of the Advent in Boston. A jurisdictional dispute concerning Grafton's overseas religious superior led to his withdrawal from the SSJE. Grafton also helped establish the American Congregation of Saint Benedict; and in 1888 he was a founder of the Sisterhood of the Holy Nativity, along with Mother Ruth Margaret.

== Episcopate ==
Grafton was consecrated bishop on April 25, 1889, at the Cathedral Church of St. Paul the Apostle, Fond du Lac, Wisconsin by William E. McLaren, Bishop of Chicago; Alexander Burgess, Bishop of Quincy; and George F. Seymour, Bishop of Springfield. During his tenure as bishop, Grafton spearheaded a great expansion the Episcopal Diocese of Fond du Lac, much of it driven by contributing much of his own personal wealth and soliciting contributions from many of his wealthy friends back east. He also left behind a legacy of printed works, sermons and essays.

In 1900 Grafton was chief consecrator of Reginald Heber Weller as bishop coadjutor of Fond Du Lac. The liturgy of the consecration was controversial. Patriarch Tikhon of Moscow, then the Russian Orthodox bishop of Alaska, was present, as well as Antoni Kozlowski of the independent Polish Catholic Church. Grafton was photographed with these other bishops wearing copes and miters (which was not widely accepted in the Episcopal Church at that time). The photo became known as the "Fond du Lac Circus".

== Bibliography ==
- C. C. Grafton, The Works of the Rt Rev Charles C. Grafton, ed. B. T. Rogers (8 vols., 1914)

== See also ==
- List of Succession of Bishops for the Episcopal Church, USA

== Sources ==
- A Sketch-book of the American Episcopate, by Hermon Griswold Batterson (Philadelphia: J. B. Lippincott & Co., 1891)
- The Episcopate in America, by William Stevens Perry (New York: The Christian Literature Company, 1895)
- The Catholic Movement in the American Episcopal Church (2nd Ed) by George DeMille (Philadelphia: Church Historical Society, 1950)
- A History of the Episcopal Church by Robert Prichard (Harrisburg, PA: Morehouse Pub., 1999)
- E. C. Miller, 'Bishop Grafton of Fond du Lac and the Orthodox Church', in Sobornost; 4:1 (1982), p. 38-48

Episcopal Church (USA) titles
Preceded by John Henry Hobart Brown	2nd Bishop of Fond du Lac; 1888–1912	Succeeded by Reginald Heber Weller
