= St. Paul's Cathedral (Wisconsin) =

Episcopal cathedral in Fond du Lac, WI, US

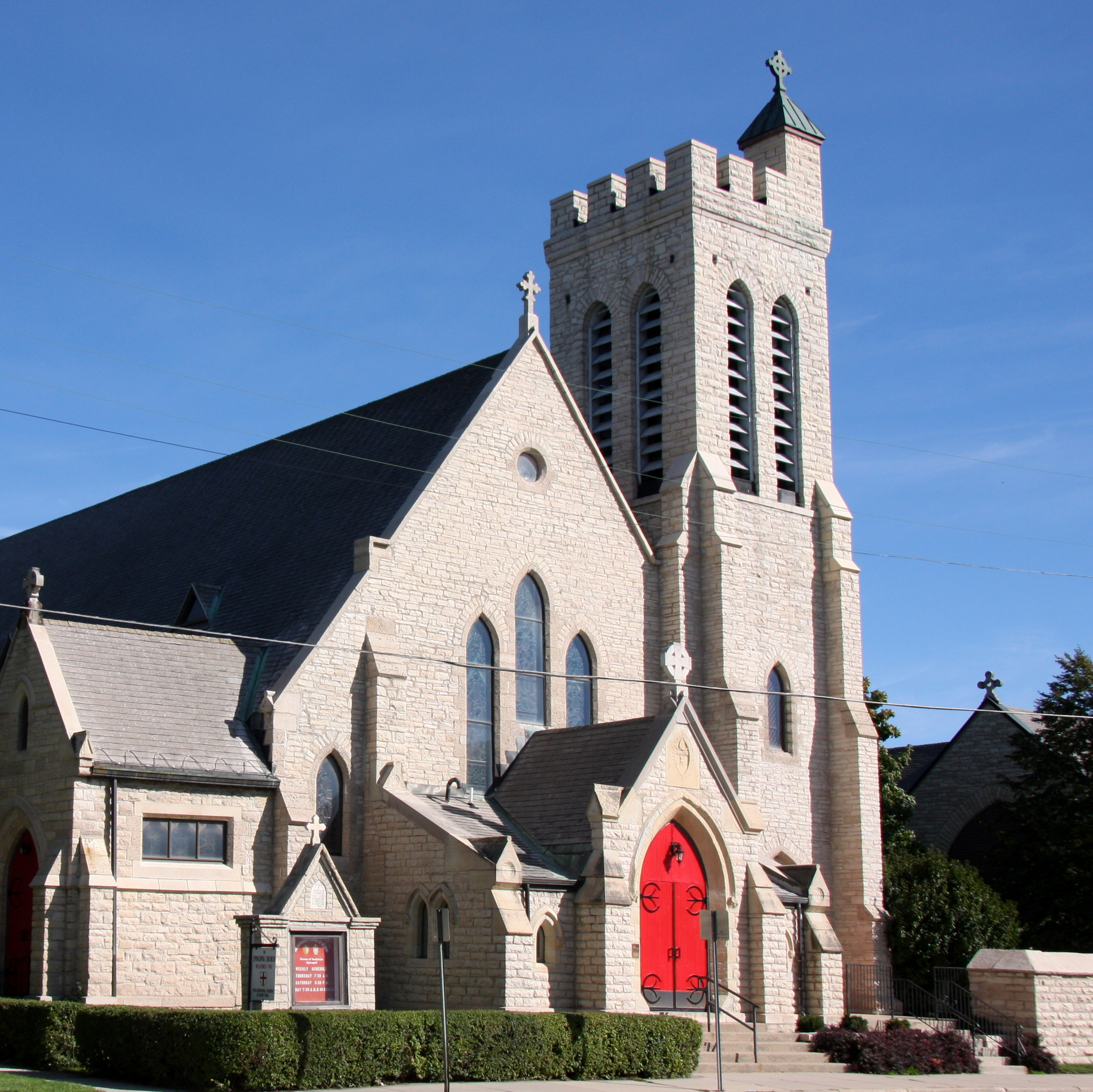
St. Paul's Cathedral in 2013

St. Paul's Cathedral is one of the three cathedrals of the Episcopal Diocese of Wisconsin, and is located in Fond du Lac, Wisconsin. It was formerly the mother church of the Episcopal Diocese of Fond du Lac.

Plate and pledge financial support reported by the church in 2024 was $119,378. No membership statistics were reported in 2024 national parochial reports. Average Sunday Attendance ASA reported in 2024 was 44 persons. This was a relative decrease on ASA of 72 in 2018.

== Formative years (1848-1865) ==
The first Episcopal church services held in Fond du Lac were in 1842 by the Rev. Richard Fish Cadle. In 1845 Bishop Jackson Kemper and the Rev. F. R. Haff visited the thriving village of 400 inhabitants, conducting services at the residence of Governor Nathaniel P. Tallmadge.

On September 3, 1848, the Rev. Joshua Sweet, the Episcopal priest for the village of Fond du Lac, formally organized St. Paul's Church. The new congregation included some well-known names in the area, such as, Doty, Tallmadge, Ruggles, and McWilliams. These names would be used as street names within the city of Fond du Lac.

These Episcopalians first worshiped in a variety of makeshift locations until in 1851 a wood-frame building was erected at the corner of Follett and Bannister streets.

== Developing Years (1866-1913) ==
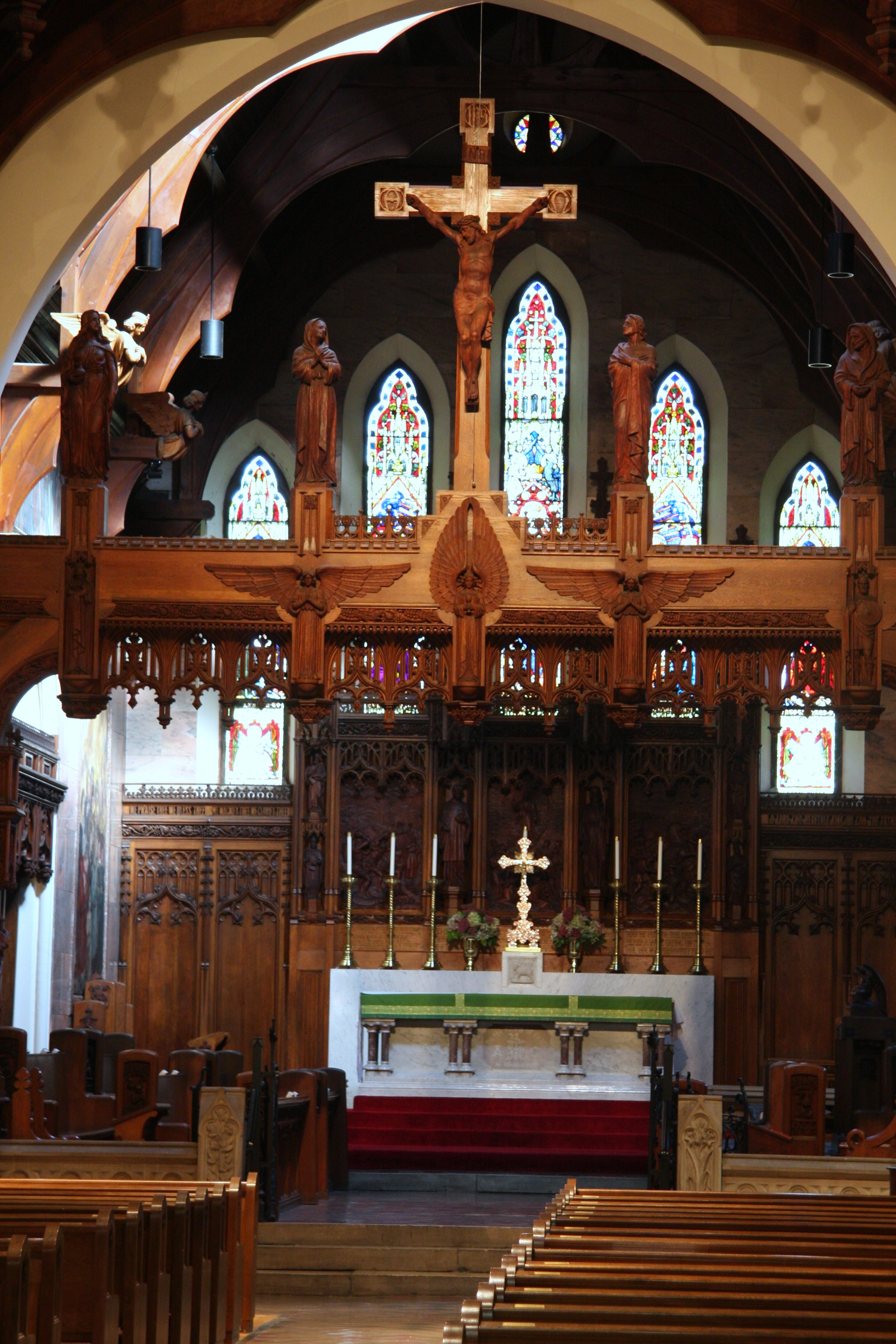
The east end of the cathedral interior

In 1866 with the growth of the congregation, it moved to its current location on West Division Street, building a new stone structure. That same year, the process was begun to erect a new diocese from the Fond du Lac Deanery of the Diocese of Wisconsin. By 1870, Fond du Lac had become the second largest city in Wisconsin. The new Diocese of Fond du Lac came to be in 1875 and shortly thereafter its new bishop, Bishop John Henry Hobart Brown declared the city of Fond du Lac and St. Paul's Church as the Episcopal See. It may have been chosen because it was a 'free-church'.

In January 1884, the building burned and was replaced by the present structure. From 1889 to 1912, Bishop Charles Chapman Grafton worked to complete the interior of the building. Early acquisitions were a pulpit (created by local stone carver Robert Powrie), a brass eagle lectern, and the German-Victorian carvings from 1893 to 1894. The carvings came from Munich and included the twelve Apostles, St. Paul, and twenty-five angels.

After Grafton's death, the Very Rev. Bernard Iddings Bell served as its first Dean until 1917 when he was commissioned a chaplain in the U.S. Navy. His institution at St. Paul's was notorious due to his public advocacy of Socialism, though he had quit the party years prior to government investigation in 1920. He wrote frequently for The Living Church and drew national attention for his book Right and Wrong After the War (1918).

== Chapel of St. Michael the Archangel ==
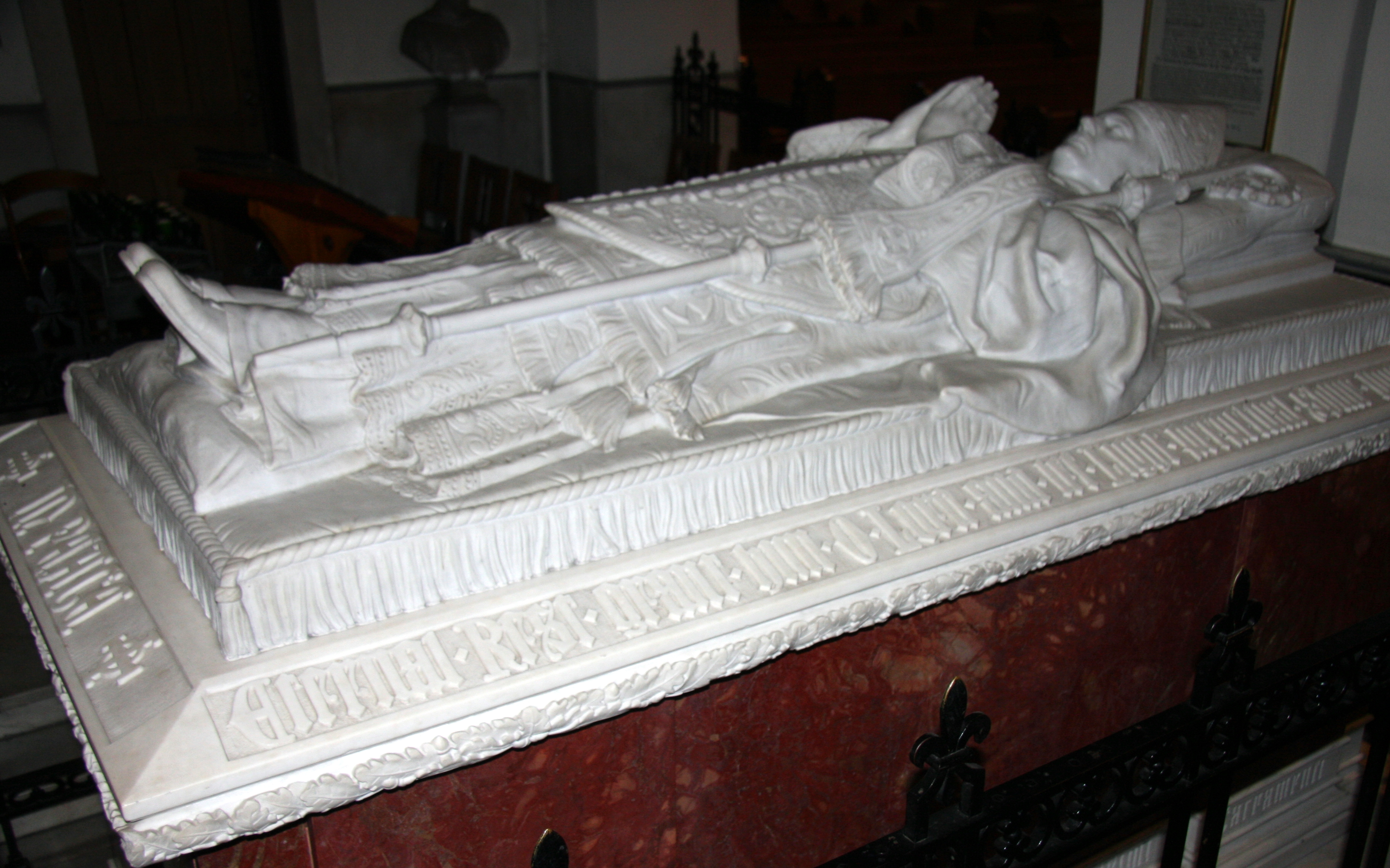
Grafton's grave in the cathedral

It was Bishop Grafton's request that he be buried in the cathedral, so in the year following his death on August 30, 1912, the area known as the Chapel of St. Michael the Archangel was redone. The burial site features a white marble and red porphyry sarcophagus, supporting a life-size figure of the bishop. The chapel became the permanent site of his burial on August 30, 1913.

== See also ==
- List of the Episcopal cathedrals of the United States
- List of cathedrals in the United States
- Bernard Iddings Bell, Dean of St. Paul's Cathedral, 1912-1919
- Albert J. duBois, canon pastor 1935-1938
