= Samuel Huckel =

American architect (1858–1917)

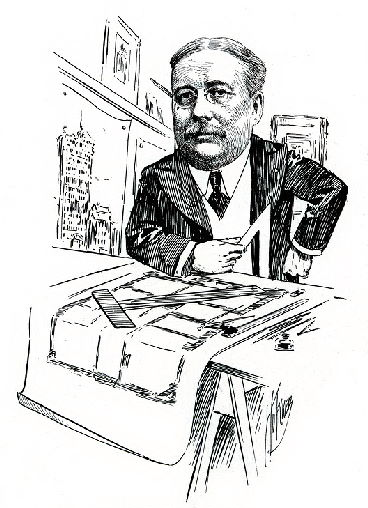
- Born: William Samuel Huckel, Jr. 1858; Frankford
- Died: 18 April 1917 (aged 58–59)
- Occupation: Architect

William Samuel Huckel Jr. (1858–1917) was an American architect in Philadelphia, where he was a pupil of William E. Winner and Benjamin D. Price and later worked first as partner at Hazlehurst & Huckel, then Watson & Huckel where he and Watson designed such well-travelled buildings as Worcester Union Station, and took many church commissions.

Huckel's career spanned over 36 years—from his work with Hazlehurst & Huckel beginning about 1881 through his death in 1917 when he was partner with Frank Rushmore Watson at Watson & Huckel.

== Early life ==
Huckel's life began in the Frankford section of Philadelphia, where he was born the son of William S. Huckel and Ruth A. Huckel in 1858. William Huckel—his father—was treasurer of the Baugh and Sons company of Philadelphia, producers and distributors of phosphate fertilizer and agricultural chemicals.

== Career ==
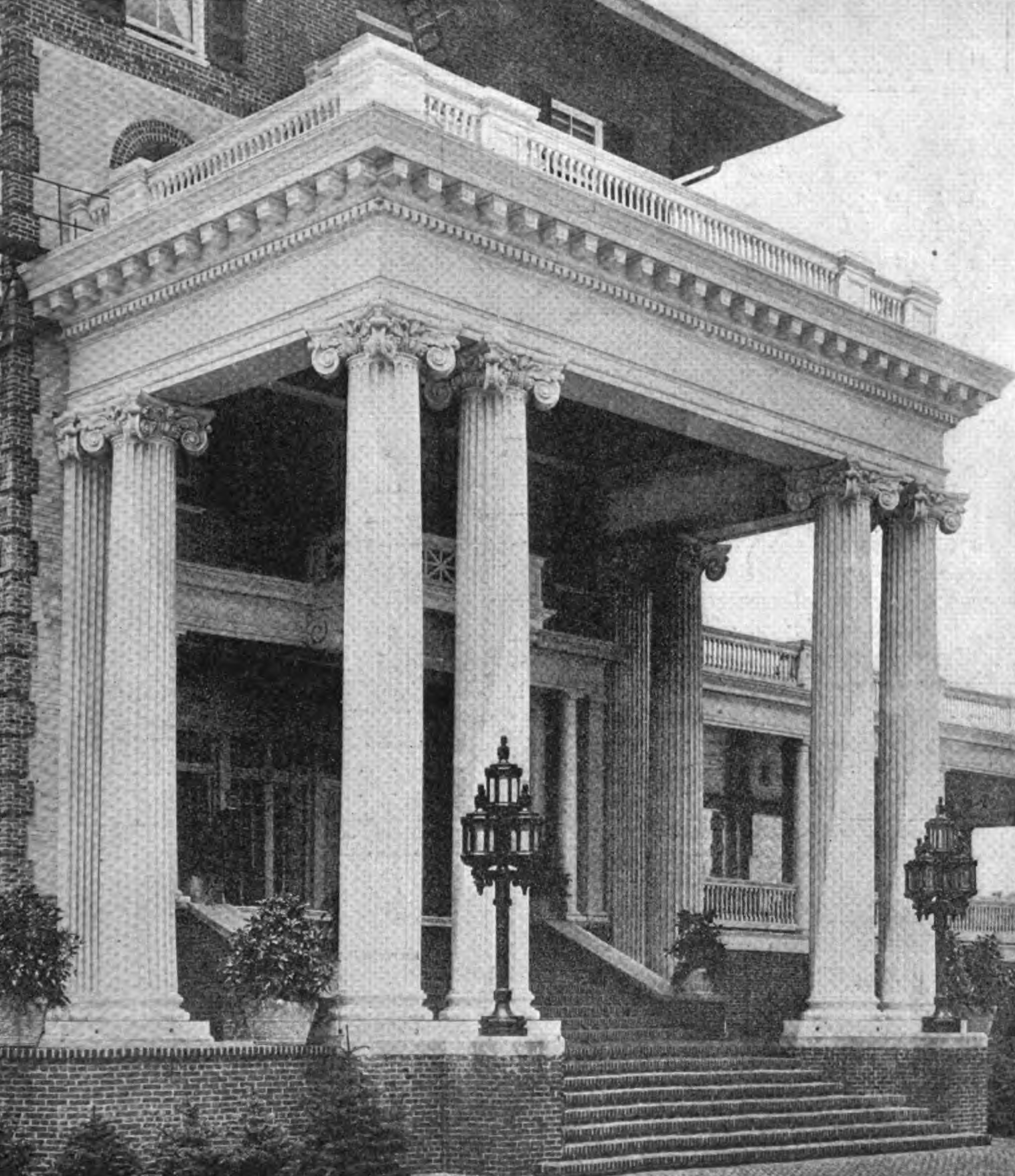
Monmouth Hotel, Ocean Entrance (1916)

After graduating from Central High School in 1879, a young Huckel spent a few months studying with painter William E. Winner until he entered the office (then at 1018 Arch Street, Philadelphia) of Benjamin D. Price—church architect and purveyor of imitation stained glass—who then took him on as a pupil.

Huckel appears to have stayed with Price at least until 1881 when he established a partnership with Edward Hazlehurst to form Hazlehurst & Watson. Huckel was still partner to Hazlehurst—having offices at 502 W. Chelten Ave., Germantown and living at 1211 Walnut Street, Philadelphia—in 1905. During Huckel's 20-year partnership with Hazlehurst, they built many "notable country houses, churches, clubhouses, office buildings, banks, boathouses, police & fire stations, and bathhouses".

After leaving Hazlehurst, Huckel partnered with Frank Rushmore Watson to form Watson & Huckel. At the very beginning of their association, they maintained an office in New York; the New York office is listed on only a few projects, including 1904 alterations for John Carstenson in Scarsdale, NY. Towards the end of his career and life, Huckel, with Watson, completed Worcester Union Station (1909–1912), the Cumberland County Courthouse (1915), and the Monmouth Hotel at Spring Lake—a "…GRAND SALON, IN LOUIS XVI STYLE." (1916).

== Death ==
"Samuel" Huckel died April 18, 1917; he was partner at Watson & Huckel.
