= St. Mark's Church, Frankford =

Coordinates: 40.0135°N 75.0872°W

- St. Mark's Church, Frankford
- Location: Philadelphia, Pennsylvania
- Country: United States
- Denomination: Episcopal

History
- Founded: 1832
- Consecrated: April 25, 1915

Architecture
- Architect: Watson & Huckel
- Groundbreaking: 1907
- Construction cost: $173,000

Administration
- Province: Three
- Diocese: Pennsylvania (1784)
- Deanery: Pennypack

St. Mark's Church is a historic church in the Frankford neighborhood of Philadelphia, Pennsylvania. It was founded in 1832. The church reported 163 members in 2015 and 185 members in 2023; no membership statistics were reported in 2024 parochial reports. Plate and pledge income reported for the congregation in 2024 was $11,054. Average Sunday attendance (ASA) in 2024 was 18 persons.

== History ==
The church was founded along traditional lines through the mission work of Trinity Church, Oxford, during an intense period of evangelical mission work in the 1830s. The Church was first a teaching center, and then grew into a missionary church. During the 1880s the new leadership of the church moved it along under the principles of the Oxford Movement.

St. Mark's Church originated two ministries in the 19th century. The Mother's Meeting began in 1860 as a way to share life and family leadership skills, along with Christian values, with mothers who were otherwise busy with the day-to-day activities of raising children and managing their households. The second was the Lay Cooperation in Ministry, which was founded on the concept that the lay people were the ministers of a church, and under their leadership and action literally countless lives can be impacted.

William Welsh, a merchant, philanthropist, zealous Christian and community leader was a prominent member of the church from 1832 until his death in 1878. In addition to superintending the Sunday school, Welsh authored, edited, and published several books and papers, as well as purchased and ran a newspaper. Welsh served on numerous boards and committees, founded the Philadelphia Divinity School and was instrumental in beginning seven churches and missions in the Episcopal Church. Welsh also helped found the Wills Eye Hospital, worked on the Girard College Board, and helped bring about the conversion of the volunteer firefighting system to a professional city department.

The Rev. Dr. Daniel Sutter Miller served as rector of St. Mark's Church from 1853 until 1871. Through his pastoral leadership, Dr. Miller inspired both the Lay Cooperation in Ministry and the Mother's meetings, as well as numerous other programs, to help the downtrodden become self-sufficient and productive members of society and the wealthy to accept their role helping humankind.

Colonel James Ashworth raised a company from the men of St. Mark's and became a decorated Union Army officer, wounded eleven times during the Battle of Gettysburg alone.

Thomas Creighton was a vestryman at St. Mark's who had a passion for education. He founded the Historical Society of Frankford and was an author, painter, and leader in Frankford and Philadelphia. His son, Frank Whittington Creighton, was consecrated Missionary Bishop of Mexico as the 351st Bishop of the Protestant Episcopal Church.

As a group, St. Mark's members have played a significant role leading Northeast Philadelphia. Over 16 streets were named for members. During times of epidemic, the church served as a clinic, and 188 troops were raised from the parish to fight in the Civil War. Over the years 39 members of this church have lost their lives on battlefields, foreign and domestic, in the service of the United States.

== Architecture ==
The building is the work of Frank Rushmore Watson, a specialist in church architecture. It is a perpendicular Gothic church with 56-foot ceilings crafted to resemble Noah's arc turned upside down. Built for 1,000 worshipers, it was intended become the Cathedral of the Diocese of Pennsylvania. It is constructed of Port Deposit granite and lined with Indiana limestone; the windows are an example of the work of Nicola D'Ascenzo, a former president of the Philadelphia Sketch Club. The church contains 69 stone carvings done by Whiteman Studios of Philadelphia. Numerous memorials given by and for church members. Especially notable is the magnificent stone reredos. The present sanctuary has had two notable pipe organs in its long history: a 1908 Haskell organ when the building was new; and a highly regarded 3-manual 1957 Aeolian-Skinner organ #1314 which still exists but is only rarely used. The present organ was designed by G. Donald Harrison in 1955, and installed and voiced under the supervision of Joseph Whiteford (Harrison was president of Aeolian-Skinner until his death in 1956, at which time Whiteford took his place.) Its formal dedication recital was in 1957, by Dr. Alec Wyton (then organist-choirmaster of NYC's Cathedral of St John the Divine.) The present organ has been altered and added to over the years; only the Great Division (middle keyboard) is the same as when installed.

== Today ==
Today St. Mark's Church continues in an economically depressed neighborhood of Frankford. Its once-substantial endowment was fully depleted by August 2019.

== Rectors ==
1. The Rev. Henry S. Spackman, 1846–1853
2. The Rev. Dr. Daniel S. Miller, 1853–1881
3. The Rev. Robert C. Booth, 1881–1889
4. The Rev. Frederick Burt Avery, D.D., 1882–1892
5. The Rev. John B. Harding, 1893–1921
6. The Rev. Leslie F. Potter, 1921–1932
7. The Rev. Edmund H. Carhart, 1933–1945
8. The Rev. Albert Fisher, 1945–1976
9. The Rev. Dr. Robert Zimmerman, 1977–1981
10. The Rev. David Hockensmith, 1982–1999
11. The Rev. Jonathan N. Clodfelter, 2002–2019
