= Frank Rushmore Watson =

American architect (1859-1940)

- Born: Frank Rushmore Watson; 28 February 1859; Frankford, Philadelphia, U.S.
- Died: 29 October 1940 (aged 81); Chestnut Hill, Philadelphia
- Education: Central High School (Philadelphia)
- Occupation: Architect
- Spouse: Fanny Foulkrod

Frank Rushmore Watson (1859–1940) was a Philadelphia architect specializing in church architecture. He graduated from Central High School, Philadelphia, in 1877. Watson entered the office of Edwin Forrest Durang, an eminent architect concentrating on Roman Catholic church projects during the last quarter of the nineteenth century. Watson spent five years with Durang before establishing his own independent firm in 1882 or 1883. While not limiting his practice to Roman Catholic projects, Watson still became well known for his church designs. So successful was he that he opened a branch office in Atlantic City, New Jersey in 1898. In 1901 or 1902, when Samuel Huckel returned to Philadelphia, a partnership between the two was established under the name Watson & Huckel. Huckel's experience with Benjamin D. Price, another architect known for his church designs, as well as his experience with Edward Hazelhurst in the firm of Hazelhurst & Huckel stood the new partnership in good stead; and the office prospered until Huckel's death in 1917. Watson then continued practicing independently until 1922, when he was joined by the younger architects, George E. Edkins, and William Heyl Thompson. At the outset, this firm was one of association, but soon the name became Watson, Edkins & Thompson. When Edkins moved to Oaklyn, New Jersey in 1936, Watson & Thompson continued in practice until Watson's death in 1940.

Watson joined the American Institute of Architects (AIA) in 1901, served as president of the Philadelphia Chapter in 1927, and was made a Fellow in 1930. He also held memberships in the Historical Society of Frankford, the Medieval Academy of America, the Philadelphia Museum of Art, and the Union League. He was given an honorary doctor of Fine Arts degree from Muhlenberg College. He also served as a delegate to the Pan American Congress of Architects meetings in South America in 1923 and 1927 and as a technical advisor to the Philadelphia Housing Association from 1929 to 1932. In 1929 he was made an honorary member of the Mexican Society of Architects. When the Architects Building Corporation was established to oversee the design and construction of that dedicated highrise, Watson was elected president of the corporation.

== Personal life and family ==
He was born on 28 February 1859 in the Frankford neighborhood of Philadelphia to Samuel and Ann Brous Watson. As an adult, in 1885, he was baptized at St. Mark's Church, Frankford, Philadelphia. He died on 29 October at Chestnut Hill Hospital, Chestnut Hill, Philadelphia, and is buried next to his first wife at Trinity Church, Oxford, Philadelphia, graveyard in the Foulkrod plot.

Frank Rushmore Watson was married two times, fathering one daughter.

- Fanny Foulkrod, daughter of Thomas S. and Elizabeth Kenworthy Foulkrod, on 18 February 1890 at St. Mark's Church, Frankford, Philadelphia. Fanny died on 26 January 1896 in Frankford, Philadelphia, Pennsylvania, and was buried next to her husband and parents at Trinity Church, Oxford, Philadelphia, graveyard.

- Rebecca Sharpless Delany. Rebecca was born on 17 April 1861 in Brooklyn, Kings, New York, to Theodore M. and Margaret Wilen Sharpless Delany. Rebecca married, first, Joseph Harrison Collins. She married Frank Rushmore Watson on 1 February 1900 at St. Mark's Church, Frankford.

His daughter with Rebecca was:

- Margaret "Peggy" m. Commander William Shipley Taylor on 12 Jun 1926 at St. Peter's Church, Germantown, Philadelphia.

== Projects ==
=== Churches ===
==== Baptist ====
- Tabernacle Baptist Church, Philadelphia

==== Episcopal ====
- St. Mark's Church, Frankford, Philadelphia
- St. Mark's Church, Frankford, Philadelphia, Parish Hall
- Christ and St. Luke Church, Norfolk, Virginia
- Church of St. Simeon, Memorial to Bishop Stevens, Philadelphia
- Church of the Covenant, Philadelphia
- Church of the Resurrection, Philadelphia
- L'Emmanuello Italian Mission, Philadelphia
- Cathedral Church of Christ, Roxborough, Philadelphia
- St.Stephen's Church, Richmond, Virginia
- St. Augustine's Church (Episcopal), Atlantic City, New Jersey
- Grace Church Chapel (Episcopal), Petersburg, Virginia
- Grace Church (Episcopal), Brunswick, Maryland
- Nevil Memorial Church of St. George, Ardmore, Pennsylvania
- St. Paul's Church, Lock Haven, PA

==== Lutheran ====
- Gideon F. Egner Chapel at Muhlenberg College, Pennsylvania
- St. John's Church, Allentown, PA

==== Methodist ====
- Centenary Methodist Church, Camden, New Jersey

==== Presbyterian ====
- First Presbyterian Church of Germantown, Philadelphia (renovations 1888-1892)
- Swarthmore Presbyterian Church, Swarthmore, PA, Sunday School Building

==== Reformed Episcopal ====
- St. Luke's Reformed Episcopal Church, Frankford, Philadelphia

==== Roman Catholic ====
- St. Stephen's Church, Philadelphia
- Our Lady of Rosary Church, Philadelphia
- St. Anthony of Padua Church, Philadelphia
- St. Anthony of Padua Church, Philadelphia, School (additions and alterations)
- St. Anthony of Padua Church, Philadelphia, Rectory
- St. Anthony of Padua Church, Philadelphia, Parish House
- St. Leo's Church, Tacony, Philadelphia
- Church of Epiphany Church, Philadelphia
- Church of the Epiphany Church, Philadelphia, School
- Church of St. John the Evangelist, Philadelphia (reconstruction post-fire 1899)
- St. Philip Neri Roman Church, Philadelphia (renovations 1897-1899)
- St. Philip Neri Roman Church, Philadelphia, Rectory
- Annunciation of the Blessed Virgin Mary Church, Philadelphia
- St. John the Baptist Church, Manayunk, Philadelphia, Parish Hall
- Nativity of the Blessed Virgin Mary Church, Philadelphia, Convent
- St. Agatha's Church, Philadelphia, Rectory
- St. Peter's Cathedral, Parochial School, Wilmington, DE

=== Public buildings ===
- Worcester Union Station in Massachusetts With Samuel Huckel, Jr.
- Cumberland County Courthouse in Bridgeton, New Jersey (1909).
- Wellington Hotel, Atlantic City, New Jersey (additions)
- Frankford Historical Society, Philadelphia
- National Security Bank, Philadelphia
- Snellenburg's Department Store, Philadelphia
- Frankford Country Club, Frankford, Philadelphia (extensive renovations)
- St. James Hotel, Asbury Park, NJ (additions)

=== Private residences ===
- 554 North 18th Street, Philadelphia
- 1527 Spruce Street, Philadelphia
- 8750 Montgomery Avenue, Philadelphia
- 3935 Chestnut Street, Philadelphia (alterations and additions)
- 1706 Ludlow Street, Philadelphia
- 1317 North Broad Street, Philadelphia
- 1319 North Broad Street, Philadelphia
- 704 North 18th Street, Philadelphia (extensive renovations)
- 7637 North Shore Rd., "Hermitage," Norfolk, Virginia (Gothic Drawing Room addition, 1922-1923)
