= William McGarvey (priest) =

American priest

- Born: August 14, 1861; Philadelphia, Pennsylvania, US
- Died: February 27, 1924 (aged 62)
- Occupation(s): Episcopal priest, later a Roman Catholic priest
- Notable work: Rector of St. Elizabeth's Church in Philadelphia, Leader of the Congregation of the Companions of the Holy Saviour (CSSS)

William McGarvey (1861–1924) was a Catholic priest and former Episcopal priest who served as rector of St. Elizabeth's Church in Philadelphia. In 1896 he became the leader of a group known as the Congregation of the Companions of the Holy Saviour (CSSS), which was associated with St. Elisabeth's.

McGarvey had been mentored by Henry R. Percival along with William Walter Webb who became president of Nashotah House. During the first few years there was a close association between Nashotah and St. Elisabeth parish. In 1906 Joseph Barry took over as president of Nashotah; he was an advocate of ritualism, but also anti-Roman. He was suspicious of the Companions, and in 1907 a dispute arose over the 'open pulpit' resolution.

In the fallout, McGarvey and many others joined the Catholic Church, including three teachers and five students at Nashotah House. This resulted in a backlash against Ritualism in the Episcopal Church. Bishop Charles Chapman Grafton and others helped to counter the backlash.

== See also ==
- Congregation of the Companions of the Holy Saviour

== Sources ==
- The Catholic Movement in the American Episcopal Church by George E. DeMille (Philadelphia: Church Historical Society, 1941)
- Impressions and Opinions by J. G. H. Barry (New York 1931)
- William McGarvey and the Open Pulpit by E. Hawks (Philadelphia, 1935) Note: The reliability of this publication is suspect.
