= Burnham Baroque =

American architectural style

Union Station in Washington, D.C. Designed by Daniel Burnham and completed in 1907, it is considered the epitome of Burnham Baroque.

Burnham Baroque is an architectural style developed by American architect Daniel Burnham at the end of the 19th and start of the 20th century. It relies heavily on a stripped Classicism with Baroque and Beaux-Arts inflections. It was popular primarily during the first three decades of the 20th century, particularly among designers of railroad stations.

== Genesis and character of the style ==
The term was coined in 1956 by architectural historian Carroll L.V. Meeks in his book The Railroad Station: An Architectural History. (Note: Wolf von Eckardt, architectural critic for The Washington Post, has written that Burnham Baroque is the accepted term for this particular evocation of the mixed Neoclassical-Baroque-Beaux Arts style, and is as legitimate a descriptor as any other term.) Meeks credits Burham's staff architect, Charles B. Atwood, with the genesis of the design. Consulting with railroad engineer J.F. Wallace, who ensured that the layout and tracks conformed to accepted industrial practice, Atwood designed the temporary railroad station which served the 1893 World's Columbian Exposition in Chicago, Illinois. Atwood's use of the triumphal arch and colonnade in this structure was widely praised, and Meeks says Burnham strongly embraced the new style after the exposition. Burnham Baroque became Daniel Burnham's favored architectural idiom.

Burnham Baroque relies heavily on Classicism, with restrained Baroque and Beaux-Arts styles (Note: Meeks points out that, at the time Burnham Baroque emerged, Art Nouveau and Beaux-Arts were often intermingled theoretically and in practice.) often incorporated into a building's fundamental structure (such as arches) as well as its details and ornament. Architectural historian Francis Morrone has gone further, arguing that Burnham Baroque combines the Chicago school with the Neoclassic and Beaux-Arts elements used by the City Beautiful movement. But where the City Beautiful movement "slathers" ornamentation over a building, Burnham Baroque uses ornament to accentuate structure. (Note: Morrone points out that Burnham Baroque shares many elements with the personal style of architect Louis Sullivan.)

== Example structures ==
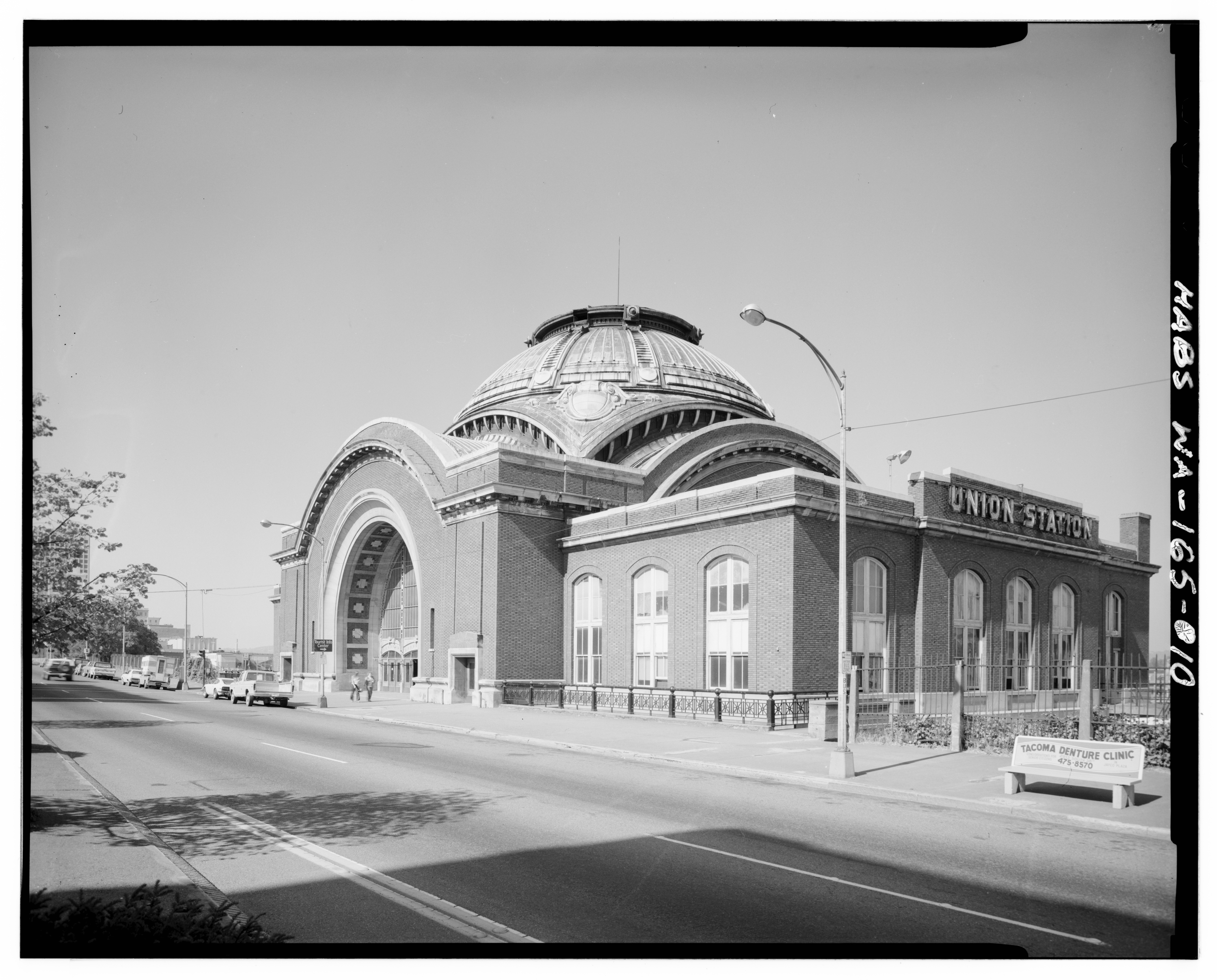
Union Station in Tacoma, Washington. Completed in 1910, this Burnham Baroque structure was designed by the firm of Reed & Stern.

Burnham Baroque was a highly influential architectural style. Burnham Baroque was one of five architectural styles utilized by the architectural firm of Graham, Anderson, Probst & White in the 1920s. (Note: This firm was the successor to Burnham's firm, D.H. Burnham & Company.) It was widely mimicked by architects designing large American metropolitan railroad stations.

Examples of Burnham Baroque include:

- Birmingham Terminal Station, Birmingham, Alabama (1909; P. Thornton Marye, architect)
- Flatiron Building, New York City, New York (1910; Daniel Burnham and Frederick P. Dinkelberg, architects)
- Grand Central Station, New York City, New York (1903; Reed & Stern and Warren and Wetmore, architects)
- State Bank of Chicago Building, Chicago, Illinois (1928; Graham, Anderson, Probst & White, architects)
- Union Station, Pittsburgh, Pennsylvania (1907; Daniel Burnham, architect)
- Union Station, Tacoma, Washington (1910; Reed & Stern, architects)
- Union Station, Worcester, Massachusetts (1911; Watson & Huckel, architects)
- Union Trust Building, Cleveland, Ohio (1924; Graham, Anderson, Probst & White, architects)
- Wabash Pittsburgh Terminal, Pittsburgh, Pennsylvania (1904; Theodore Link, architect)
- Washington Union Station, Washington, D.C. (1907; Daniel Burnham, architect)

== Bibliography ==
- Babb, Laura Longley; Anderson, Claudia; Parks, Sabina (1978). The Washington Post Guide to Washington. New York: McGraw-Hill.
- Breslin, Ed; Van Dusen, Hugh (2011). America's Great Railroad Stations. New York: Viking Studio. ISBN 9780670023110.
- Chappell, Sally Anderson (1992). Architecture and Planning of Graham, Anderson, Probst, and White, 1912-1936: Transforming Tradition. Chicago: University of Chicago Press. ISBN 9780226101347.
- Harmon, Justin (2011). "The World's Columbian Exposition, 1893". What Happened?: An Encyclopedia of Events That Changed America Forever. Volume 3. Santa Barbara, Calif.: ABC-CLIO. ISBN 9781598846218.
- Harmon, Justin; Lewis, Amy (1993). American Cultural Leaders: From Colonial Times to the Present. Santa Barbara, Calif.: ABC-CLIO. ISBN 9780874366730.
- Hines, Thomas S. (1979). Burnham of Chicago, Architect and Planner. Chicago: University of Chicago Press. ISBN 9780226341712.
- Meeks, Carroll L.V. (1956). The Railroad Station: An Architectural History. New Haven, Conn.: Yale University Press. OCLC 1030508.
- Meeks, Carroll L.V. (1995). The Railroad Station: An Architectural History. New York: Dover Publications. ISBN 9780486286273.
- Morrone, Francis (2003). Architectural Guidebook to New York City. Salt Lake City: Gibbs Smith. ISBN 9781586852115.
- Nash, Eric Peter; McGrath, Norman (2010). Manhattan Skyscrapers. New York: Princeton Architectural Press. ISBN 9781568989679.
- Van Trump, James D. (1983). Life and Architecture in Pittsburgh. Pittsburgh: Pittsburgh History & Landmarks Foundation. ISBN 9780916670085.
