= Sisterhood of the Holy Nativity =

Anglican religious order

The Sisterhood of the Holy Nativity (SHN) is an Anglican religious order for women founded in 1882 by Charles Chapman Grafton SSJE. Three sisters and six novices of the Society of St. Margaret (SSM), associated with the Cowley Fathers, left SSM in 1882 to establish the new order. Sister Ruth Margaret Vose (1826-1910) was its first mother superior. The order was incorporated in Wisconsin on May 29, 1921, and remains active in the Episcopal Diocese of Wisconsin.

Sister Abigail assumed office as reverend mother in 2012. The sisterhood's bishop visitor is the Right Rev. Matthew Gunter, Bishop of Wisconsin.

== Houses, daughter houses, and parochial ministries ==
- Portland, Maine
- Providence, Rhode Island (1888-1983), motherhouse 1888-1906
- Newport, Rhode Island at the Zabriskie Memorial Church of St. John the Evangelist
- New York, New York (1909-1965) at Church of St. Mary the Virgin (Manhattan)
- Philadelphia, Pennsylvania at S. Clement's Church, the Church of the Annunciation, and St. Timothy's Episcopal Church, Roxborough
- Baltimore, Maryland at Mount Calvary Church
- Santa Barbara, California (1952-2013)
- Fond du Lac, Wisconsin Convent of the Holy Nativity (1905-1999), burned 2019, demolished 2021
- Oneida Nation of Wisconsin, Green Bay
- Ripon, Wisconsin, Bethlehem-by-the-Lake, 1999—present
