= Oliver Sherman Prescott =

American Anglo-Catholic priest and activist

Oliver Sherman Prescott (March 24, 1824 - November 17, 1903) was a prominent American Anglo-Catholic priest and activist who was active in the foundation of the Society of St. John the Evangelist.

== Early life and education ==
He was born in New Haven, Connecticut and was one of four sons. He was baptized by Harry Croswell at Trinity Church on the Green in New Haven. Prescott attended Trinity College, Hartford from 1840 to 1842 and Yale College from 1843 to 1844; he was graduated from the General Theological Seminary in New York in 1847 and made a deacon that year at Trinity Church in New Haven. He considered himself a protégé at the General of Professor Clement Clarke Moore.

== Career ==
Prescott was an early member of the abortive monastic order the Society of the Holy Cross, founded at Valle Crucis, North Carolina by Bishop Levi Silliman Ives. Following the collapse of the order, he served as an assistant priest at the Church of the Advent, Boston; here his Ritualist activities provoked the censure of the diocesan Bishop Manton Eastburn and resulted in four ecclesiastical trials between 1850 and 1853. He was acquitted. Prescott served in a number of other parishes - the Church of the Ascension, Westminster, Maryland (1852-1857); St. Peter's, Ellicott City, Maryland (1857-1861); Trinity Church, Newport, Rhode Island (1861-1864); and Christ Church, West Haven, Connecticut (1865-1869) without provoking ritual or doctrinal controversy.

He next joined the Cowley Fathers (the Society of St. John the Evangelist (SSJE) with Charles Chapman Grafton and Richard Meux Benson, living at their religious houses in England from 1869 to 1876. Prescott then served at S. Clement's Church, Philadelphia from 1876 to 1881, during which time the SSJE entered into a more formal relationship with the parish. He was rector in succession to Theodore M. Riley. Extensive local religious controversy continued here over matters of Anglo-Catholic ceremonial and practice, with charges brought against Prescott by Bishop William Bacon Stevens. In June 1879, Prescott was formally charged with genuflection, using candles unnecessary for light, wearing unauthorized vestments, elevating the eucharistic host and chalice, employing acolytes, celebrating Holy Communion without sufficient numbers of communicants, and using prayer texts and hymns unauthorized in the Protestant Episcopal Church. He was again acquitted.

After S. Clement's, Prescott was rector of St. Peter's Church, Ripon, Wisconsin in the Episcopal Diocese of Fond du Lac (1882-1886) and finally St. Luke's Church, New Haven, an historic African American congregation, beginning in 1886. He was a deputy to the General Convention of the Episcopal Church in the United States of America from the Diocese of Fond du Lac in 1883 and 1886.

He died unmarried and without issue in Verbank, New York and was buried in a family cemetery plot in New Haven.

Prescott's successor as rector of S. Clement's Duncan Convers SSJE wrote an undated manuscript biography that was subsequently used by Jervis Zimmerman in the preparation of his 2012 biography.

== Bibliography ==
- Trial of the Rev. O. S. Prescott, Presbyter of the Diocese of Massachusetts, on Charges of Heresy (New-York: M'Gown, 1851)
- The Power of the Resurrection: A Sermon Preached in Trinity Church, Newport, R.I. on the Seventh Sunday after Trinity, 1863, being the Sunday Following the Funeral of Clement Clark Moore, L.L.D. (Newport, Rhode Island: Charles E. Hammett Jr., 1863)
- The Benedicite: An Hymn of Praise to the Triune God: A Sermon Preached in Zion Church, New York, on the First Friday in Lent, 1864 (New York: J. Pott, 1864)
- The Cross of Christ: A Lenten Sermon, Preached in Christ Church, West Haven (New-York: James Pott, 1867)
- Is Fairness in Religious Controversy Impossible? A Letter to the Rev. Daniel R. Goodwin, D.D., LL.D. (Philadelphia: James McCauley, 1879)
- The Charges against the Rector of St. Clement's Protestant Episcopal Church, in Philadelphia, together with His Statement, Explanation, Protest, and Arguments of Counsel (Philadelphia: Times Printing House, 1879)
- A Letter from the Rev. E. B. Pusey, D.D. (1879)
- Pamphlet about the Evangelistic Mission at St. Clement’s Church (1879) from Philadelphia Studies
- Daniel R. Goodwin, Notes of the Investigation by the Bishop and Standing Committee in Reference to Certain Practices at St. Clement's Church (1880)
- Apostolic Conditions to Church Communion: A Sermon upon the Instruction to Cornelius and His Kinsfolk and Friends, by S. Peter, When He Opened the Kingdom of Heaven to the Gentiles (New York: Church Critic Press, 1890)
- A Forgotten Memorial, by Duncan Convers (1921)
