= Hermon Griswold Batterson =

American priest

- Born: May 28, 1827; Marbledale, Connecticut
- Died: March 9, 1903
- Occupation: clergyman
- Known for: Sketch-book of the American Episcopate

Hermon Griswold Batterson (May 28, 1827 – March 9, 1903) was an American clergyman. He was born in Marbledale, Connecticut. He was ordained to the diaconate on November 17, 1861 by Alexander Gregg and to the priesthood on December 19, 1865 by Henry Benjamin Whipple. Batterson became rector of Saint Clement's Church, Philadelphia and served in that capacity until 1872. He was subsequently rector of the Church of the Annunciation, also in Philadelphia. He served as rector of the Church of the Redeemer, New York City, from 1891 until his retirement.

His widow donated the building of Christ Church Cathedral in Salina, Kansas in his memory.

Batterson's Sketch-book of the American Episcopate is a standard biographical work for American Anglican church history.

== Works ==
- A Paper Read before the Vestry of S. Clement's Church, Philadelphia (1871)
- The missionary tune book: adapted to the Book of Common Prayer (1868)
- The Christmas Bells: A Carol (1876)
- Christmas carols and other verses (1877)
- A sketch-book of the American episcopate (1878, 1884)
- Christmas Carol (1880)
- Easter Hymn (1881)
- (editor) A Manual of Plain song for the Offices of the American Church (1890)
- Vesper Bells and Other Verses (1896)
- The Pathway of Faith: A Manual of Instructions and Prayers for the Use of those who desire to serve God in the station of life in which He has placed them (1897)
