= Henry R. Percival =

Henry Robert Percival (April 30, 1854 – September 22, 1903) was a prominent American Episcopal priest and author. After studies at the University of Pennsylvania and the General Theological Seminary in New York, he was made a deacon on May 27, 1877, and ordained to the priesthood on June 10, 1878. Percival served briefly after ordination at Grace Church, Merchantville, New Jersey, and as curate from 1878 to 1880 at a chapel of Christ Church, Philadelphia. He was elected rector of the Church of the Evangelists, Philadelphia, in 1880, and pursued a plan of Anglo-Catholic enrichment of its services; he oversaw the building of a new church beginning in 1885 and the planting of S. Elisabeth's Church as a nearby mission under the care of the Congregation of the Companions of the Holy Saviour and William Ignatius Loyola McGarvey. (Since 1922, the Evangelists church building has housed the Fleisher Art Memorial.) Percival retired as rector in 1897, citing ill health, and was succeeded by the Reverend Charles W. Robinson.

He was the author of an appendix on "The Theological Value of Incense" in The Case for Incense, submitted to His Grace the Archbishop of Canterbury on May 8, 1899.

Percival received an honorary doctorate of divinity degree from Nashotah House Theological Seminary in 1891. He died in Devon, Pennsylvania and is buried at St. Peter's Episcopal Churchyard in Philadelphia.

== Bibliography ==
- Non-Communicating Attendance versus Non-Communicating Non-Attendance, 1888
- The Doctrine of the Episcopal Church So Far As It Is Set Forth in the Prayer Book, 1891
- On the Question of Swedish Orders, 1892
- A Digest of Theology, Being a Brief Statement of Christian Doctrine according to the Consensus of the Great Theologians of the One, Holy, Catholic and Apostolic Church, together with an Appendix Containing, among Other Things, in English, the Doctrinal Decrees of the Ecumenical Synods, 1893
- The Glories of the Episcopal Church, with an Appendix in Answer to Roman Objections, 1894
- The Inspiration of Holy Scripture and Six Other Essays, 1896
- The Invocation of Saints Treated Theologically and Historically, 1896
- The Seven Ecumenical Councils of the Undivided Church: Their Canons and Dogmatic Decrees, together with the Canons of all the Local Synods which have Received Ecumenical Acceptance, 1900
- The Reservation of the Blessed Sacrament, no date
- The XXXIX Articles Vindicated from the Aspersions of High Church Assailants, no date
- Guide-Book to the Church of the Evangelists, Philadelphia, 1904 (posthumous)
