= George Herbert Moffett =

American priest

George Herbert Moffett (1858 - November 12, 1904) was a prominent American Anglo-Catholic priest and Ritualist leader. Born in Cincinnati, he was graduated from Trinity College, Hartford (salutatorian, 1878) and the General Theological Seminary in New York (1881) before ordination to the diaconate on June 12, 1881, by Bishop Horatio Potter of the Episcopal Diocese of New York.

He served as curate at Mount Calvary Church, Baltimore from July, 1881 to December, 1885, and developed a close association with the All Saints Sisters of the Poor that continued through his ministry. He was rector at the former Church of the Holy Innocents in Hoboken, New Jersey (1886-1895). He served as rector of S. Clement's, Philadelphia, continuing its tradition as a center of American Anglo-Catholicism. Passenger lists for arrivals at the Port of New York from England indicate frequent travels to England to alleviate strain brought on by overwork. He died of a heart attack brought on by nervous exhaustion while vesting to celebrate Mass and was buried in the Moffett mausoleum in Woodlawn Cemetery in New York City on November 16, 1904. During his tenure, in 1898 S. Clement's became the first Anglican parish in North America to practice perpetual reservation of the Blessed Sacrament.

== Bibliography ==
- "Rector Fatally Stricken," The New York Times, November 13, 1904, p. 7.
- "Solemn Services over Dr. Moffett," The Philadelphia Inquirer, November 17, 1904, p. 6.
- "Funeral of a Noted Episcopal Priest: Services over the Remains of the Rev. George H. Moffett, Late Rector of St. Clement's Church," The Morning News, (Wilmington, Delaware), November 17, 1904, p. 3.
- Obituary, Star Tribune, (Minneapolis), November 14, 1904, p. 2.
- Obituary, Hartford Courant, November 18, 1904, p. 6.
- "In Memoriam George Herbert Moffett Priest", The Churchman, November 19, 1904, p. 939.
- "Appreciations of Three Priests Deceased" in The Living Church (Milwaukee), December 3, 1904, p. 172.
- "In Memoriam George Herbert Moffett Priest", The Churchman, November 19, 1904, p. 939.
