= Franklin Joiner =

Franklin Joiner (October 25, 1887-October 28, 1960) was rector of Saint Clement's Church (Philadelphia, Pennsylvania) from 1920 to 1955. He was born in Belvidere, New Jersey to Presbyterian Civil War veteran Frank Sellers Joiner and Marietta Mensch from a Pennsylvania German Lutheran family. Joiner was a postulant for ordination from St. Mark's Church, Grand Rapids in the Episcopal Diocese of Western Michigan, transferring to the Episcopal Diocese of Pennsylvania on April 20, 1920 after service as deacon in charge of the Church of the Epiphany, South Haven, Michigan. He was ordained to the diaconate on May 17, 1917 by William Walter Webb, Bishop of Milwaukee, and to the priesthood in May, 1918.

He was Superior General of the American Branch of the Guild of All Souls from 1924 to 1958. Joiner served as a member of the standing committee of the Diocese of Pennsylvania for 26 years, and was its president from 1940 to 1955. He received an honorary Doctor of Divinity degree from Nashotah House in 1933.

== Published writings ==
- The Eucharist and the Body of Christ (1930)
- The Early Days at St. Clement's, Philadelphia
- Shrine of Our Lady of Clemency, St Clement's, Philadelphia (Our Lady's Mirror, 1948)
