= Henry S. Spackman =

Henry Spencer Spackman (March 11, 1811 - February 9, 1875) was a Pennsylvania politician and clergyman who served as the first rector of St. Mark's Church, Frankford, Pennsylvania, S. Clement's, Philadelphia, and Trinity Church, Williamsport, Pennsylvania.

He was born in Philadelphia as a son of shipping magnate Samuel Spackman (1780-1852) and Ann Bellerby (1777-1842). He was graduated from the University of Pennsylvania and admitted to the Philadelphia Bar on April 11, 1832. Spackman served in the Pennsylvania House of Representatives from 1834 to 1838, and was elected to the Pennsylvania State Senate for the sessions of 1839, 1841, and 1843 for Philadelphia County.

Spackman abandoned politics and was ordained to the diaconate in 1846; he assumed duties as rector of St. Mark's Church, Frankford, where he served until 1853. He served as the first rector of S. Clement's, Philadelphia from 1856 to 1863, overseeing the construction of the building well before the beginning of Anglo-Catholic Ritualist activities for which the parish was subsequently distinguished. He also served as a Union hospital chaplain during the Civil War, mustering on November 15, 1862.

Spackman next became the first priest of Trinity Church, Williamsport, serving from January, 1866 to September, 1868, when he returned to Philadelphia to become chaplain again at the Episcopal Hospital.

He married the Presbyterian Anna Cornelia Elliot (August 21, 1835 - February 1, 1926) following her first 1855 marriage to Cyrus Davies. Henry Spackman and Anna Elliot Davies Spackman were the parents of Julia K. Spackman and Lieutenant Colonel Henry S. Spackman.

Henry Spencer Spackman is buried in the churchyard at St. James the Less, Philadelphia.
