= United Anglican Church =

The United Anglican Church is a small American Continuing Anglican denomination formed in 2002 through the merger of the Traditional Episcopal Church (TEC) and the Anglo-Catholic Church in the Americas (ACTA). It has parishes in Pennsylvania and Delaware. It also sponsors the Laud Hall Theological Seminary as an institution for theological education. Its headquarters is in York, Pennsylvania.

The bishop of the United Anglican Church's Eastern Diocese is the Rt. Rev. Barry Yingling, CSSS. He is the author of the Churchman's Ordo Calendar, published by Ashby Publishing.
