= Edward O. Hendricks =

Edward Oscar Hendricks (May 3, 1929 – January 19, 1980) was a prominent American Anglo-Catholic priest who served most notably as rector of Saint Clement's Church, Philadelphia from 1965 to 1978. A graduate of the University of Texas at Austin (1951), he was rector of the Church of the Holy Family, McKinney, Texas and the former Christ Church, Elizabeth, New Jersey (burned January 16, 1988) before coming to S. Clement's.

He died of liver failure in Kemp, Texas, and was buried in the family plot at Oakland Memorial Park in Terrell, Texas. He was unmarried.
