= Church of the Annunciation, Philadelphia =

Episcopal Church in Philadelphia, Pennsylvania, United States

Church of the Annunciation
- Church of the Annunciation of the Blessed Virgin Mary
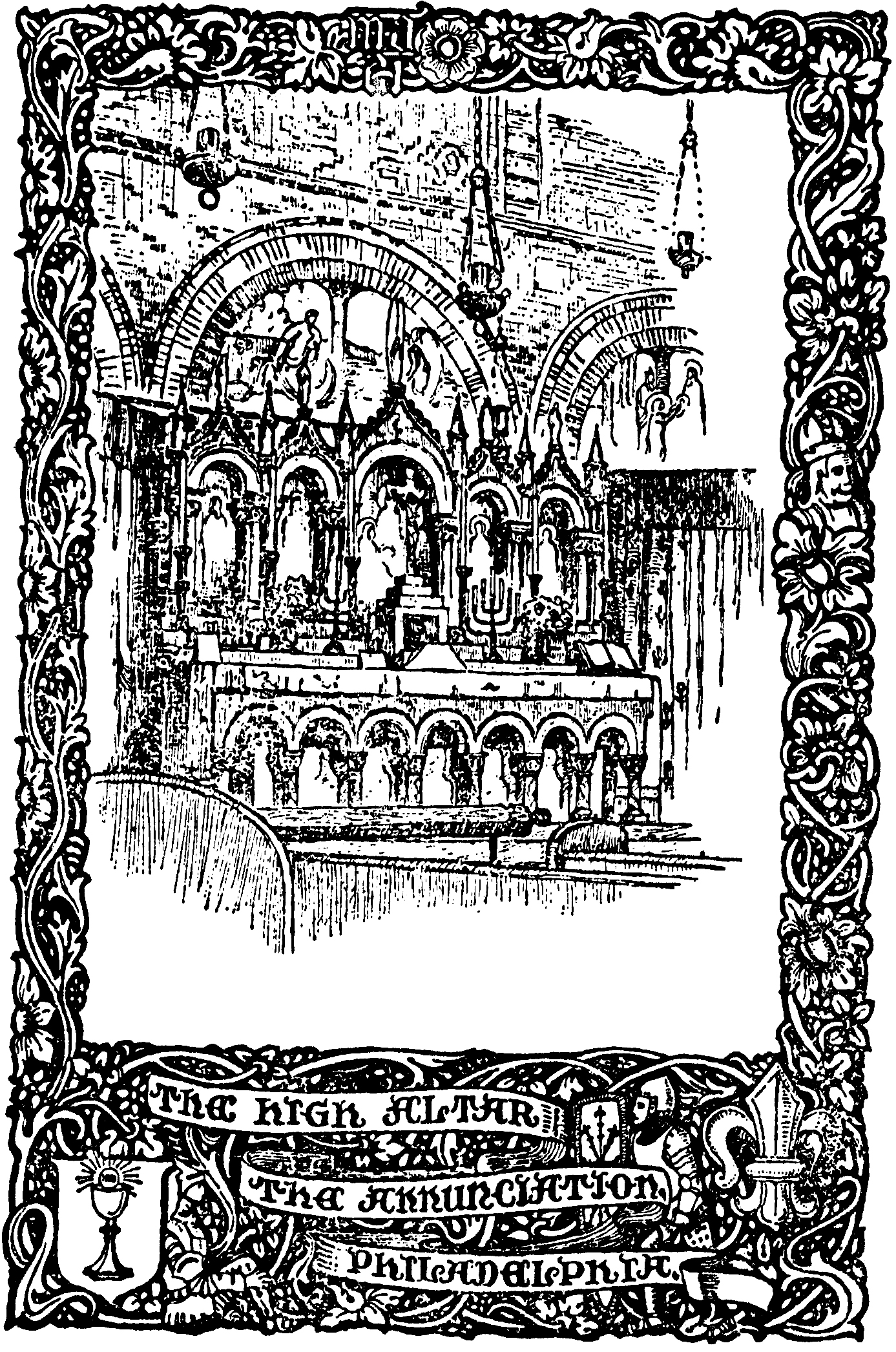

- Location within Pennsylvania Location within the United States
- 40.049599999416095°N 75.1922447142735°W
- Location: 324 Carpenter Lane; Philadelphia, Pennsylvania 19119-3003
- Country: United States
- Denomination: Episcopal
- Website: https://churchoftheannunciationbvm.com/

History
- Founded: 1870
- Dedication: Blessed Virgin Mary
- Earlier dedication: Jesus Christ

Architecture
- Architect(s): Charles Marquedent Burns, Jr. (1837-1922)
- Groundbreaking: April 20, 1882

The Church of the Annunciation, also called the Church of the Annunciation of the Blessed Virgin Mary, is a North Philadelphia Episcopal church in the Episcopal Diocese of Pennsylvania. It has an historic Anglo-Catholic liturgical identity. Its original name as a mission congregation beginning in 1870 was the Church of Our Merciful Saviour until 1882. Founded formally in 1880, it had 580 active members in 1960, and reported average attendance of 15 in 2022. The church reported average Sunday attendance (ASA) of 16 in 2024 with plate and pledge financial support of $27,623. In 2023, it reported 99 members. No membership statistics were reported in 2024 national parochial reports.

The church's first rector was Hermon Griswold Batterson, the third rector of S. Clement's, Philadelphia, following the end of his tenure at that church over protracted ritualist disputes and accusations of sexual misconduct in the early 1870s. In 1943, Annunciation absorbed the congregation of St. Christopher's Episcopal Church, which ended its own separate corporate existence in 1947. Annunciation BVM's congregation was mostly African American by the middle of the twentieth century.

The parish's first Romanesque building was located at Twelfth and Diamond Streets in Philadelphia. Ground was broken on April 20, 1882, followed by the laying of a cornerstone on June 26, 1884. The church building included elements by the New York architectural firm of Heins & LaFarge. It included a bell tower, an adjacent parish house for educational and parochial activities, and free sittings for 650 persons in addition to a large chancel for acolytes and choristers. The reredos was painted by Anita Sargent and Marianna Sloan.

Incense was first used in 1888, and the Blessed Sacrament was reserved from February 4, 1896 onward. It was among the first Anglican churches anywhere in the world to practice Benediction of the Blessed Sacrament and eucharistic exposition. Nuns from the Sisterhood of the Holy Nativity worked in the parish as visitors, sacristans, and educators. The parish also had a close connection to the Order of the Holy Cross, an Anglican religious order for men in which long-time rector the Rev. Robert C. Hofmeister was a postulant twice in the 1960s. The church occasionally shared services with St. Alban's Church, Olney, another small Philadelphia Anglo-Catholic parish.

The first church burned on the night of April 6, 1990 but its parish hall was used for worship briefly after that time. Its congregation also worshiped with S. Clement's Church following the fire. The remains of the church were demolished at an unknown date. The congregation then moved to a new building in Northwest Philadelphia near Mount Airy.

The church previously had a large number of internal organizations, including a Sunday school, Episcopal Church Women, the Guild of St. Vincent for Acolytes, S. Mary's Guild, S. Elizabeth's Guild, S. Laurence's Guild, S. Agnes' Guild, St. Ambrose Guild, and wards of the Guild of All Souls and the Confraternity of the Blessed Sacrament. Several of its clergy were also associated with the Congregation of the Companions of the Holy Saviour (CSSS), an Anglo-Catholic fraternity for celibate male priests.

== Notable clergy ==
- Hermon Griswold Batterson (1827-1903) first rector (1880-1889)
- Nalbro Frazier Robinson (rector 1889-1892)
- Daniel Ingalls Odell (1811-1889, rector from 1892)
- Carl I. Shoemaker
- Robert S. Harris, CSSS
- Frank Williamson, Jr. CSSS
- Robert Clayton Hofmeister CSSS (1931-2003, curate from 1960-1961, rector from 1971-1993)

== Bibliography ==
- Charter, By-Laws and Rules of Order of the Church of the Annunciation
