= Congregation of the Companions of the Holy Saviour =

Anglo-Catholic religious order

The Congregation of the Companions of the Holy Saviour (CSSS for Congregatio Sociorum Sancti Salvatoris) is an Anglo-Catholic dispersed religious order founded in 1891 at the former Church of the Evangelists in Philadelphia (now the Samuel S. Fleisher Art Memorial). It was subsequently affiliated with the former S. Elisabeth's Church in Philadelphia.

CSSS founder William McGarvey became a Catholic in 1908 due to the allowance of non-Episcopal Protestant clergy to preach in Episcopal churches. Many CSSS members followed McGarvey into the Catholic Church, but several continued as clergy of the Protestant Episcopal Church in the United States.

The order's core members are called companions, and must be celibate men in holy orders (or candidates for holy orders). Associates of the order may be men or women. It was formally incorporated in the Commonwealth of Pennsylvania on February 21, 1906. During the second half of the twentieth century, several members were connected with the Church of the Annunciation, Philadelphia.

In 2022, the Master of the CSSS is Bishop Barry E. Yingling of the United Anglican Church.

== Works ==
- CSSS Charter from the Catholic Historical Research Center of the Catholic Archdiocese of Philadelphia
- Obsequiale: Or, the Rites To Be Observed at the Burial of the Dead (1907)
- J.G.H. Barry, Impressions and Opinions: An Autobiography (New York, 1931)
- E. Hawks, William McGarvey and the Open Pulpit: An Intimate History of a Celibate Movement in the Episcopal Church, and of Its Collapse, 1870-1908 (Philadelphia, 1935)
- William L. Hayward, The C. S. S. S.: The Quest and Goal of the Founder, the Right Rev. William McGarvey (Philadelphia, 1940)
- George E. DeMille, The Catholic Movement in the American Episcopal Church (Philadelphia: Church Historical Society, 1941)

== See also ==
- Anglican religious order
- Church of the Annunciation, Philadelphia
- Society of Catholic Priests
- Society of the Holy Cross
