= Winnie Owens-Hart =

American ceramist, sculptor (born 1949)

- Born: 1949 (age 76–77); Washington, D.C., U.S.
- Education: University of the Arts (BFA); Howard University (MFA)
- Occupation: Visual artist
- Known for: Ceramist, sculpture

Winnie Owens-Hart (born 1949) is an American ceramist and sculptor known for blending traditional African pottery techniques with contemporary ceramics. A graduate of the University of the Arts and Howard University, she has exhibited widely in the U.S. and abroad. Owens-Hart has taught at Howard University and held residencies at prestigious institutions, including the Smithsonian's Renwick Gallery. Her deep engagement with African ceramics began in Nigeria, where she apprenticed with Indigenous women potters. She continues to explore cultural heritage through her art, and has earned numerous accolades, including a National Endowment for the Arts fellowship and a Lifetime Achievement in the Craft Arts Award from the Smithsonian Institution.

== Early life and education ==
Winnie Owens-Hart was born in 1949, in Washington, D.C. Owens-Hart received a Bachelor of Fine Arts degree from the University of the Arts in Philadelphia; followed by a Master of Fine Arts degree from Howard University in Washington, D.C.

== Career ==
Owens-Hart has exhibited in many solo and group shows in the United States and abroad. Owens-Hart has been a visiting artist at the University of Ife, now known as Obafemi Awolowo University, Ile Ife, Nigeria, the Penland School of Crafts, and the McColl Center for Visual Art, Sierra Nevada College, and artist-in-resident at Pewabic Pottery, Baltimore Clay Works, Watershed, North Edgecomb, and Haystack Mountain School of Crafts.

Among museums which hold examples of her work is the Renwick Gallery of the Smithsonian Institution; she has created public artwork for Arlington County, Virginia, and has worked at the Samuel S. Fleisher Art Memorial in Philadelphia. She has received an Individual Craftsman Fellowship from the National Endowment for the Arts.

Owens-Hart first came to Nigeria during the World Festival of Black Arts with Jeff Donaldson, Nelson Stevens, and other African American artists representing the United States. After the FESTAC event, Owens-Hart obtained a fellowship to return to Nigeria. She joined the faculty of the University of Ife as a ceramic artist. During her tenure at Ile Ife, she met the artist Agboola Folarin, who took her to the Indigenous pot makers at Ipetumodu, a small town near Ile Ife, which was then famous for handbuilt pottery. At Ipetumodu, she worked with Indigenous women potters to whom she apprenticed herself and learned the skills of building pots with Indigenous pottery techniques and open-air firing.

The immigration process prevented her from remaining in Nigeria, so Owens-Hart returned to the United States. There, Owens-Hart joined the Howard University art department, where Jeff Donaldson was the chair.

Owens-Hart set up a ceramic studio in Virginia, where she made monumental ceramic pieces. Owens-Hart later returned to Ghana to work with indigenous potters. She has become an important community member among the indigenous women potters in Ghana and has completed a documentary film, “The Traditional Potters of Ghana: The Women of Kuli”.

In 2026, she was named a fellow by the American Craft Council (ACC).

== Honors and awards ==
Owens-Hart has received a variety of honors and awards, including:

- Honorary Board Member, Renwick Museum, Smithsonian Institution
- Lifetime Achievement in the Craft Arts Award, Renwick Fellow, Smithsonian Institution
- Fellow, Smithsonian Institution Faculty Research Program
- National Endowment for the Arts – Individual Craftsmen Fellowship, 1978
