= Duncan Convers =

American priest and author (1851–1929)

Duncan Convers (August 2, 1851 - April 22, 1929) was a prominent American Anglo-Catholic priest, author, and social commentator. He was born in Zanesville, Ohio, made deacon on June 11, 1876, and ordained priest on December 20, 1876, following studies at Nashotah House Theological Seminary. Convers served initially in the Missionary Diocese of Colorado. In 1886 he was professed as a mission priest of the Society of Saint John the Evangelist (SSJE, Cowley Fathers) and began missionary service in Philadelphia. He was elected rector of S. Clement's Church, Philadelphia in succession to Basil Maturin SSJE in 1889 and served in that position until 1891. He subsequently served at the SSJE's mission Church of Saint John the Evangelist, Bowdoin Street, in Beacon Hill, Boston.

Convers left the Cowley Fathers to serve as rector at St. Paul's, Gas City, Indiana during 1902. He also served at the Church of Our Saviour in Montoursville, Pennsylvania (1903-1905) and at St. John's Church, Toledo, Ohio. Convers then renounced his American citizenship to become a subject of King George V, and lived in Saint John, New Brunswick as rector of the Church of St. John the Baptist there from 1908 to 1913. He returned to Massachusetts and SSJE vows in 1913 and submitted a petition for re-naturalization in Boston on January 12, 1916. He was restored to American citizenship on April 14, 1919. He died unmarried and without issue in Boston in his own residence rather than the Cambridge SSJE monastery and was buried in Foxborough, Massachusetts in the Cowley Fathers Cemetery, adjacent to the cemetery for the sisters of the Arlington-based Order of St. Anne. He was a popular retreat conductor, guest preacher, confessor, and spiritual director.

== Bibliography ==
- Once Married, Married Till Death: A Sermon Preached (in Substance) in St. Clement's Church, Philadelphia, at the Night Service on the Second Sunday After Easter, April 27th, 1884 (Philadelphia, 1884)
- Marriage and Divorce in the United States: As They are and as They Ought to be (J.B. Lippincott, 1889)
- Our Three States: In the Image of God, Fallen Nature, Renewed Nature (London: A.R. Mowbray, 1899)
- A Forgotten Memorial (1921, journal article and stand-alone pamphlet)
