= Francis C. FitzHugh =

Anglo-Catholic priest

Francis Coulbourn FitzHugh (August 23, 1928 – October 12, 1984) was an American Anglo-Catholic priest who served as rector of S. Clement's Church, Philadelphia from 1979 until his death. Born in Cape Charles, Virginia, he studied at Bishop's University in Quebec and at Oxford before his ordination to the priesthood in 1956. FitzHugh served parishes in Canada, the United Kingdom, the West Indies, and elsewhere in the United States before his call to S. Clement's.

At the time of his death on a train traveling between Orlando, Florida and Philadelphia, he was a senior member of the Society of the Holy Cross (SSC) in the United States and of the Society of King Charles the Martyr. He died unmarried and was buried in a family plot at Cape Charles Cemetery in Cape Charles, Virginia. He was survived by his parents and a sister, Virginia Sadler Fitzhugh (1909-2002).
