= Peter Laister =

Peter Laister (May 12, 1927 – October 24, 2002) was a prominent Anglo-Catholic priest in the twentieth century. He was born and died in London.

Laister trained for ordination at Saint David's Theological College, Lampeter, Wales and at St. Stephen's House, Oxford, being made a deacon in 1956 and priest in 1957. He began his ministry as a curate in the Diocese of Chelmsford, 1956–60. He served as a Royal Navy Chaplain, 1960–65; Curate of Saint Mary Magdalene, Munster Square, London, 1965–66; Vicar of Our Most Holy Redeemer with St Philip, Clerkenwell, 1970–86; Rector of S. Clement's Church, Philadelphia, 1986–1993, later rector emeritus.

He was a member of the American council of the Guild of All Souls 1986–1992 and served as president of the English branch of the GAS. The Peter Laister Fund of the UK Guild of All Souls is valued in 2025 at £207,244.
