= Samuel S. Fleisher =

Jewish-American manufacturer, art patron, philanthropist

Samuel Stuart Fleisher
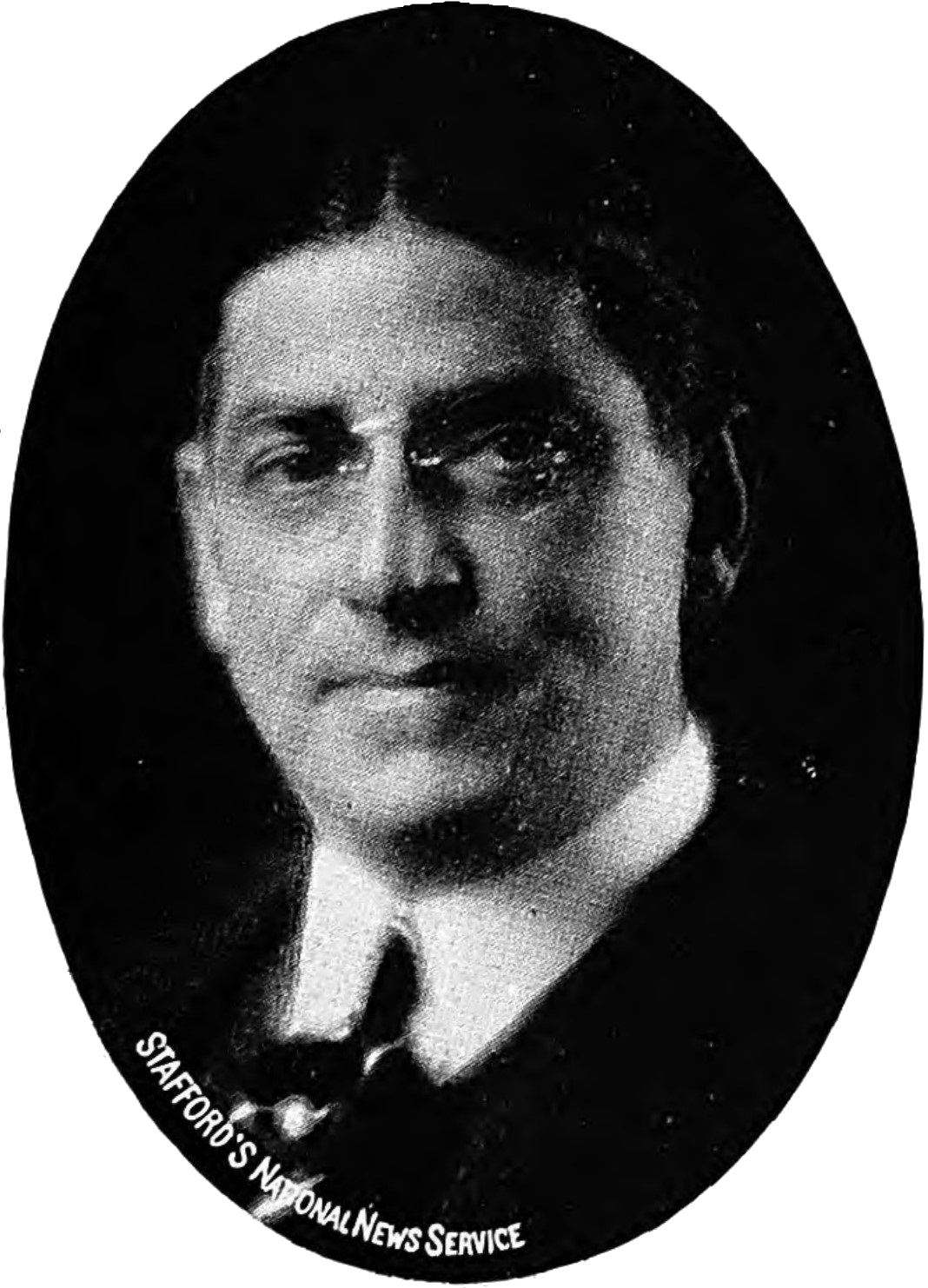
- Fleisher in a 1925 publication
- Born: November 27, 1871; Philadelphia, Pennsylvania, U.S.
- Died: January 20, 1944 (aged 72); Philadelphia, Pennsylvania, U.S.
- Education: Wharton School of the University of Pennsylvania (1892)
- Occupations: Manufacturer, art patron, philanthropist
- Known for: Founder of the Graphic Sketch Club; civic and Jewish communal leadership

Samuel Stuart Fleisher (November 27, 1871 – January 20, 1944) was a Jewish-American manufacturer, art patron, and philanthropist from Philadelphia, Pennsylvania.

== Life ==
Fleisher was born on November 27, 1871, in Philadelphia, Pennsylvania, the son of Simon B. Fleisher and Cecelia Hofheimer. His family were German immigrants who established a prosperous yarn and clothing manufacturing business.

Fleisher graduated from the Wharton School of the University of Philadelphia in 1892. He was vice-president of S. B. & B. W. Fleisher, Inc., which manufactured worsted yarn. The firm was his father's, and he worked there until his retirement in around 1919. He soon became involved in communal life via his interest in philanthropy in general and in artistic endeavors in particular. He founded the Graphic Sketch Club in 1899, serving as the sole supporter for its art courses and art collections. By 1941, around 3,100 students attended the free art training the club offered. Interested in juvenile welfare, he was vice-president of the Juvenile Protective Association from 1909 to 1913, an executive committee member of the Philadelphia Vice Commission in 1913, a director of the Court Aid Society from 1913 to 1918, and vice-president of the Ellis College for Fatherless Girls from 1919 to 1926. In the 1929 Recreation Congress, he suggested a cultural Olympics be held to foster aesthetic competition as well as sanctuaries of art and aesthetic competitions in high schools. He received The Philadelphia Award in 1923, the first Jew to receive the award.

Fleisher was a director of the Sesquicentennial Exposition in 1926, a member of Regional Planning Committee from 1928 to 1932, a member of the Philadelphia housing committee for the Federal Emergency Administration of Public Works starting in 1934, and a member of the Philadelphia commission for the beautification of the metropolitan area from 1925 to 1932. Active in Jewish communal life, he was a trustee of the Baron de Hirsch Fund from 1903 to 1932, chairman of the Baron De Hirsch Agricultural School at Woodbine, New Jersey, from 1908 to 1920, chairman of the Woodbine Community Center from 1926 to 1932, and a director of the Jewish Foster Home and Orphan Asylum from 1903 to 1915 (after which he became an honorary director). He attended Congregation Keneseth Israel.

Fleisher died from a brief illness at Temple University Hospital on January 20, 1944. He was buried in Mt. Sinai Cemetery.
