= Theodore M. Riley =

American Anglo-Catholic Priest

Theodore Myers Riley (June 9, 1842 - December 1, 1914) was a prominent American Anglo-Catholic priest, author, and seminary professor born in Carlisle, Pennsylvania.

== Early life and education ==
Theodore Myers Reily (Dickinson spelling) attended Carlisle High School and Dickinson College prior to entering theological seminary in New York. He was a student at the General Theological Seminary in New York City from 1861-1863; and was made a deacon on June 28, 1863, in the Episcopal Diocese of New York. He was ordained to the priesthood, also in the Diocese of New York, by Bishop Horatio Potter in 1866. He was a graduate of the General Theological Seminary.

There is a record for a Theodore Riley having enlisted in the Union Army in Baltimore, Maryland on December 31, 1862; and having deserted on February 16, 1863, the desertion also recorded at Baltimore.* Since Theodore Myers Riley was a student in his final year at the General Theological Seminary in New York City at this time, it seems highly unlikely that he was the individual in the army record. Moreover, he successfully completed his theological studies in 1863 and was consecrated a Deacon of the Episcopal Church in the same year.

== Career ==
He served first as rector of All Saints, Navesink, New Jersey (then called Riceville) in the Episcopal Diocese of New Jersey (1866-1872). He achieved international notoriety as rector of S. Clement's, Philadelphia from 1872 to 1875 during a controversy over ritualism with diocesan bishop the Right Reverend William Bacon Stevens. The bishop demanded that Riley cease wearing vestments unauthorized in the Protestant Episcopal Church, that he refrain from mixing water with the wine in the celebration of the Holy Communion, that he cease elevations during the Prayer of Consecration, that genuflection by choristers and clergy before the altar be discontinued, that there should be no lighted candles unless necessary for illumination, and that the hearing of private confessions be discontinued. With the ritual controversy unresolved, he resigned and was succeeded by Oliver Sherman Prescott of the Society of Saint John the Evangelist; Riley was called to the Church of the Ascension in Chicago, Illinois but declined nomination. He was rector of the former Holy Trinity Church, Minneapolis from 1876 to 1882.

Riley served as Professor of Ecclesiastical History at Nashotah House Theological Seminary (1882-1893), and Professor of Pastoral Theology at the General Theological Seminary in New York (1894-1902). He was chaplain to the sisters of the Community of St. Mary at Kemper Hall in Kenosha, Wisconsin for 13 years concurrent with his tenure at Nashotah House. Blindness forced his retirement from seminary teaching, and he was made an honorary canon of All Saints Cathedral, Milwaukee. He retired as rector of Christ Church, Hudson, New York and was made rector emeritus. He also served briefly as locum tenens at St. Luke's Church, Lebanon, Pennsylvania, and Trinity Church, Muscatine, Iowa.

Riley wrote extensive biographies of seminary dean Eugene Augustus Hoffman and Charles George Gordon (the "Chinese Gordon"), whom he considered an "uncanonized saint."

He was buried in Carlisle, Pennsylvania on December 5, 1914. The Faculty of the General Theological Seminary issued an obituary memorial note dated January 7, 1915:

- "The fact that Dr. Riley remained unmarried perhaps tended to the wider expansion of his affections among friends, who highly appreciated his many attractive and lovable traits. He always was eminently the priest: but with his hearty love of others, his extensive reading and refinement of culture, his delicate sense of humor and the inexhaustible fund of anecdote wherewith he was wont to apply it, he was one of the most charming of associates. It is sad to think of the comparative loneliness of the last days of one so congenially companionable; but surely the faith to which his life had been so constantly devoted must have enabled him to share the sustaining conviction of his Divine Master who, though all had forsaken Him, could not be alone, since the Father was with Him. And in their kindly commemoration of their departed friend, the faculty are glad to think of him as at rest in that gracious and unfailing support."

== Bibliography ==
- Reily, Theodore Myers, House Divided: The Civil War Research Engine at Dickinson College
- Ancestry.com. New York, U.S., Civil War Muster Roll Abstracts, 1861-1900
- A Sermon Preached at a Service of Commemoration Held in All Saints' Memorial Church in the Highlands of Navesink, N.J. in Memory of James A. Edgar, Esq., of Elizabeth N.J. (New York: Baker and Godwin, 1867)
- Charles George Gordon, A Nineteenth Century Worthy of the English Church: A Biographical Sketch (Milwaukee: The Young Churchman Co., 1888)
- Sermon Preached at a Memorial Service Commemorative of the Right Reverend Cyrus Fredrick Knight Fourth Bishop of Milwaukee, Holden on the 14th of October, 1891 (Milwaukee: Burdick, Armitage, 1891)
- A Memorial Biography of the Very Reverend Eugene A. Hoffman, Late Dean of the General Theological Seminary (New York: privately printed, 1904)
  - volume one
  - volume two
- The Christ Church Manual of Private Devotion (Hudson, New York: Bryan Printing, 1906)
