= Samuel S. Fleisher Art Memorial =

- Fleisher, Samuel S., Art Memorial
- U.S. National Register of Historic Places
- Pennsylvania state historical marker
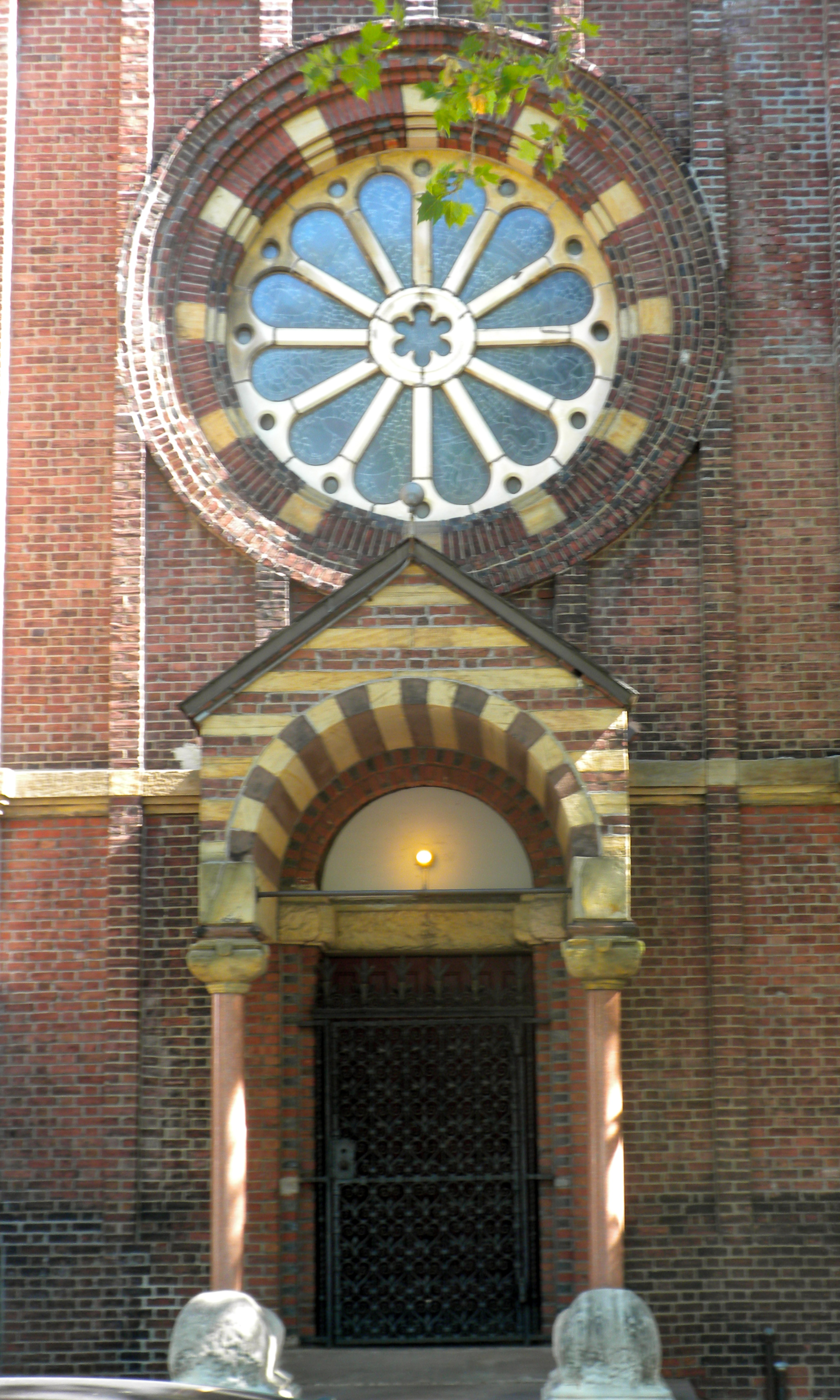

- Location within Philadelphia Location within Pennsylvania Location within the United States
- Location: 711-721 Catharine St., Philadelphia, Pennsylvania
- Coordinates: 39°56′20″N 75°9′20″W
- Area: 0.3 acres (0.12 ha)
- Built: 1857
- Architect: Baker, L. C.; Dallett, E. J.
- Architectural style: Italianate, Romanesque
- NRHP reference No.: 82001547

Significant dates
- Added to NRHP: November 14, 1982
- Designated PHMC: September 13, 2005

Samuel S. Fleisher Art Memorial is a set of four buildings consisting of the former Church of the Evangelists and St. Martin's College for Indigent Boys. Previously an Episcopal church in the Bella Vista neighborhood of South Philadelphia, it is best known as the home of the Graphic Sketch Club founded by Samuel S. Fleisher, which still offers free and low-cost studio art classes to children and adults. Fleisher Art Memorial is renowned for its long-standing mission of making art accessible regardless of economic means, background, or artistic experience.

The four buildings include a campanile built in 1857, a basilica built 1884-1886, St. Martin's College built in 1906, and two rowhouses built in the 1850s. Since Fleisher's death in 1944, his trust, which owns the buildings, has been administered by the Philadelphia Museum of Art. The Art Memorial was listed on the National Register of Historic Places in 1982 and is located at 711-721 Catharine St. in Philadelphia, Pennsylvania.

== Church of the Evangelists ==
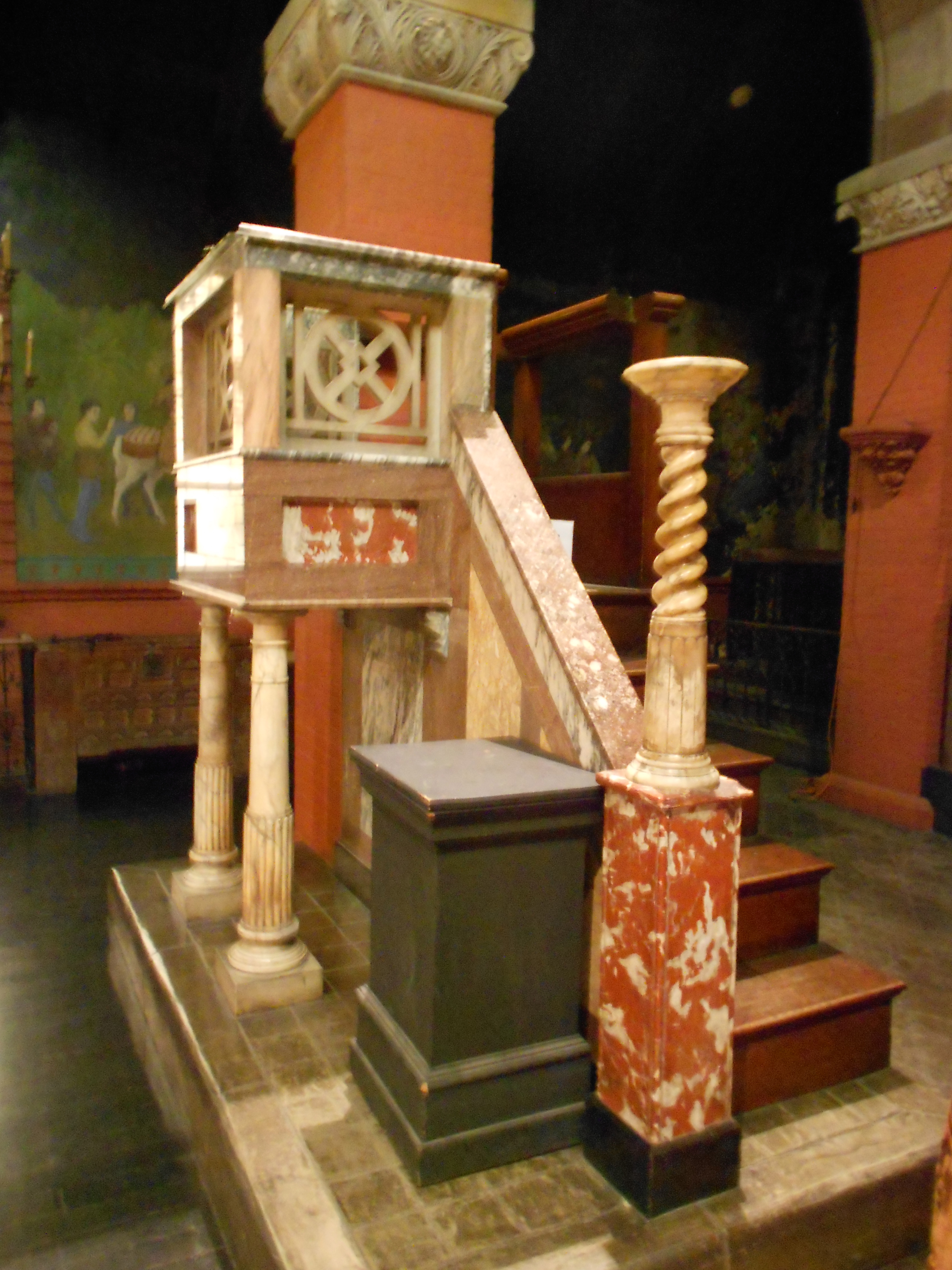
Pulpit in the church

The Church of the Evangelists was established as a mission church for the poor of Catharine Street in 1837, by Episcopalians named William Welsh and Horace Binney, among others. A church building was constructed in 1857 which includes the campanile which still stands. The church's viability became a concern by 1880, possibly because of the influx of non-Episcopal immigrants to the neighborhood.

The Reverend Henry R. Percival, a well-known high church Episcopal priest, revived the fortunes of the Church of the Evangelists when he was appointed rector in 1880.

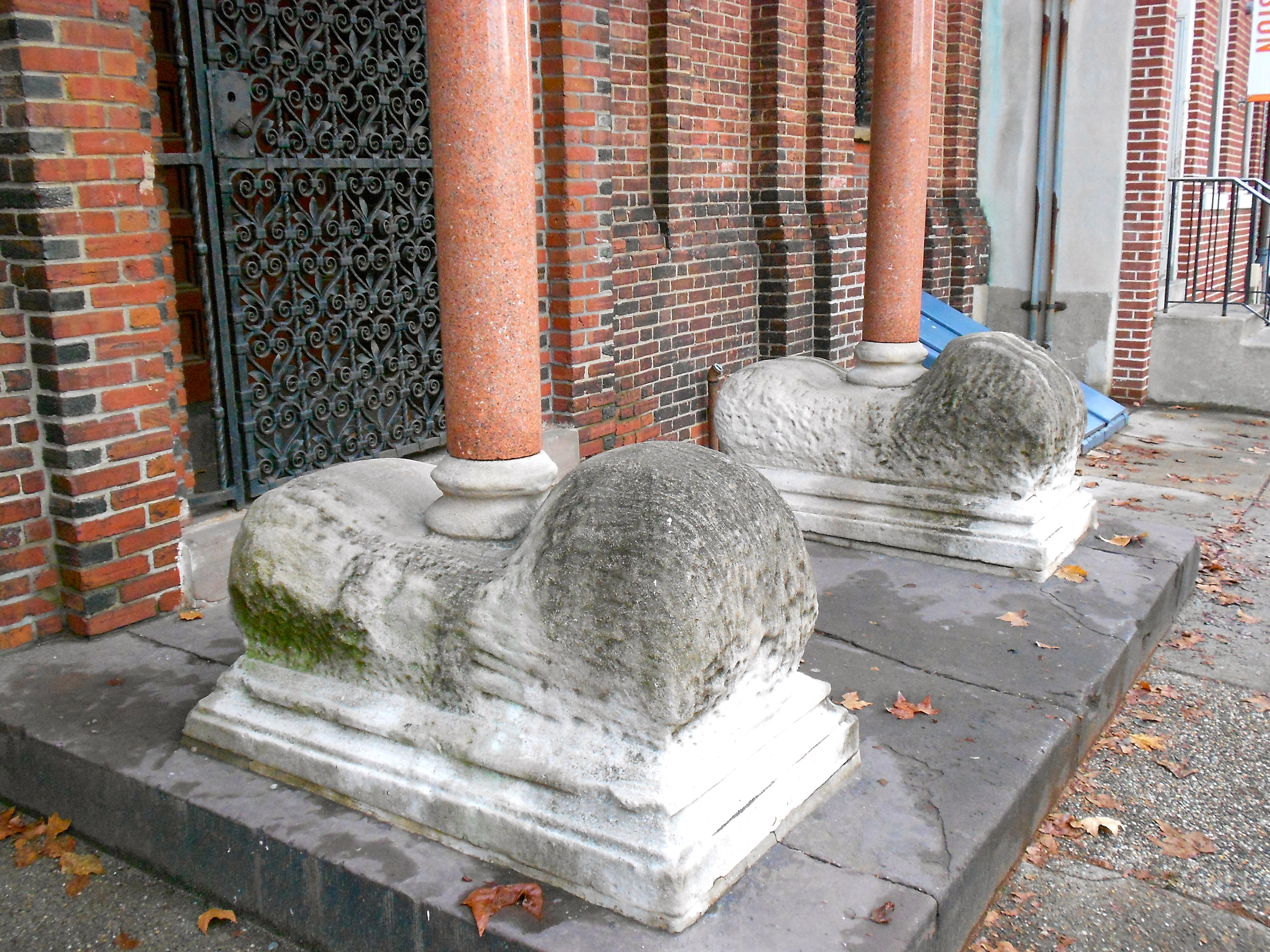
Unfinished exterior decoration

The well-connected Percival had traveled in Italy and had "a sensibility which combined Italian and Anglo-Catholic romanticisms." He wished to rebuild the church based on the Romanesque models of St. Mark's Basilica in Venice, the Cathedral of Pisa and the Orvieto Cathedral. The 1884 design by the firm Furness and Evans was in actuality based on San Zeno Maggiore in Verona.

Frescos in the church were painted by Robert Henri, Nicola D'Ascenzo, local parishioners. Much of the interior decorative work was left unfinished. The influences on the architecture include "Italy, Ruskin, the ecclesiological movement, and the pageantry of medieval Christianity." James van Trump is more critical, stating that "a rather self-conscious coterie of late nineteenth century Philadelphia haute bourgeoisie, 'engaged', one might say in being 'Catholic', cultivated, and artistic."

The Sanctuary still has the church's original Wurlitzer pipe organ and is the last such factory-installed organ in Philadelphia.

After Percival retired on account of illness in the 1890s, the church's fortunes declined. St. Martin's College for Indigent Boys was built in 1906, perhaps in an effort to fight the decline and better connect with the non-Episcopalian neighborhood.

== Graphic Sketch Club ==
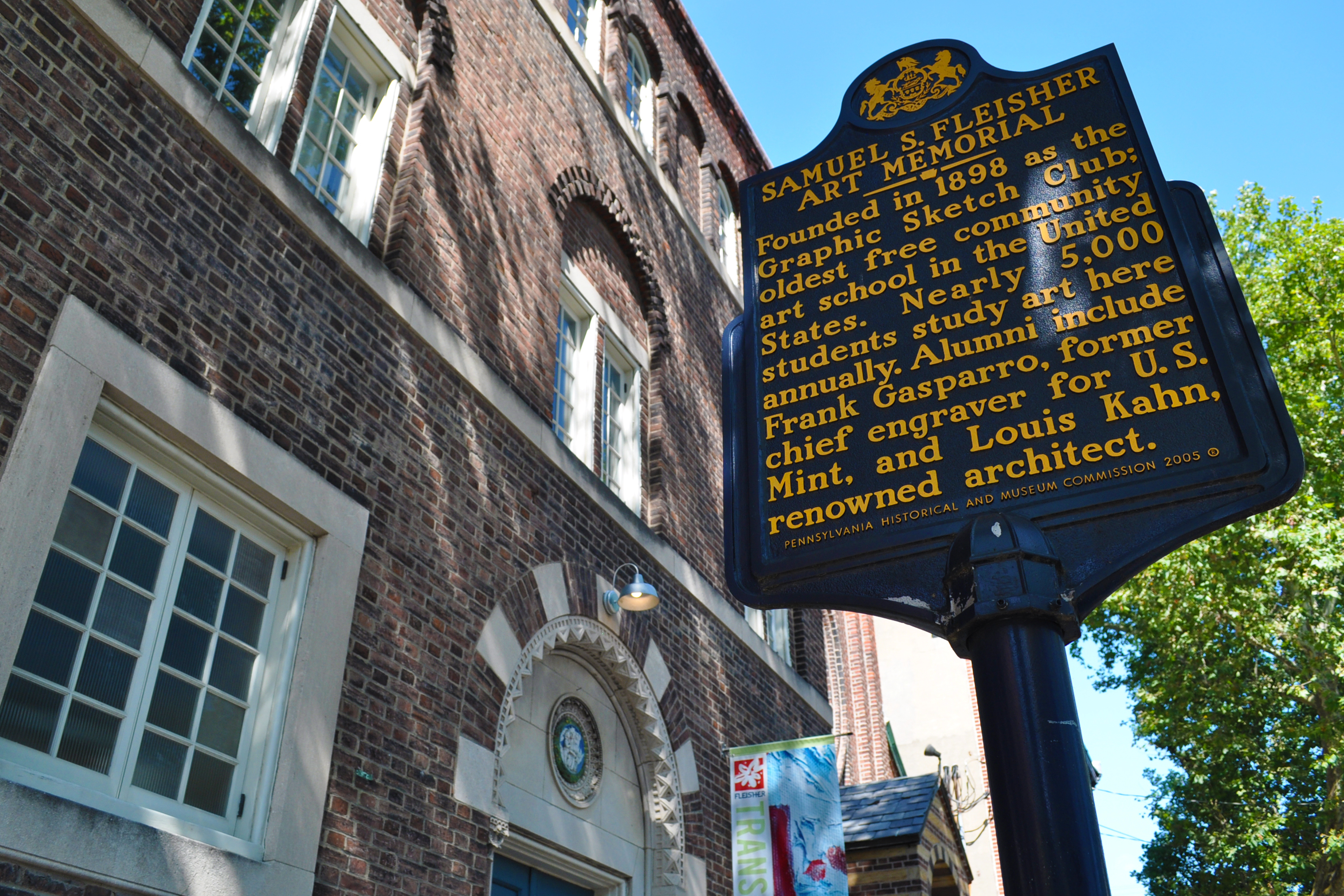
Samuel S Fleisher Art Memorial Historical Marker

Samuel Stewart Fleisher, the son of German Jewish immigrants, became vice-president of the family business after graduating from the Wharton School. By that time the family business, the Fleisher Yarn Company, was a major manufacturer of hand-knitting yarns and worsted fabric. Fleisher was extraordinarily concerned for the welfare of the company's workers, their children, and others who lived in the neighborhood.

Thousands of young people toil during the day whose lives are unavoidably cast upon a background of routine and sameness—the world's work must be done—to them should be offered pastures where beauty and inspiration may be gathered, places where rich and poor alike may give expression to their finer emotions—playgrounds for the soul.

— Samuel S. Fleisher

Fleisher started offering free art classes to children in 1898 in the Jewish Union building at 422 Bainbridge Street. Later known as the Graphic Sketch Club, the institution gave free, non-competitive, collaborative classes to both children and adults without discrimination by race or nationality. In 1906 it moved to a larger building at 740 Catharine Street, then in 1916 it moved across the street to Saint Martin's College for Indigent Boys. The church was purchased and converted into an art gallery in 1922.

In 1944, Fleisher died and left his estate in trust to the Philadelphia Museum of Art to continue the Graphic Sketch Club, which was renamed the Samuel S. Fleisher Art Memorial. Initially managed as a program of the Philadelphia Museum of Art, Fleisher became its own independent non-profit corporation in 1983, yet maintains a strong administrative link to the Museum even today.

== Fleisher Art Memorial Today ==
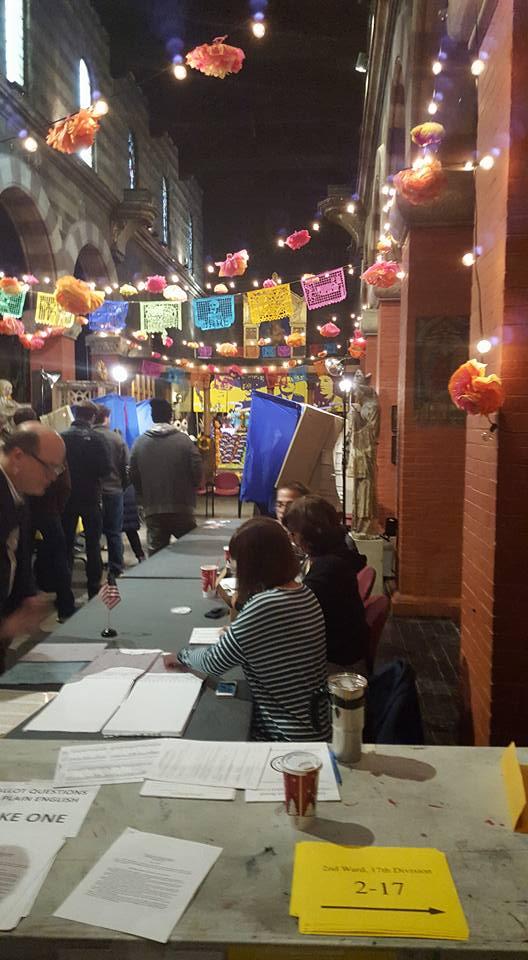
The former sanctuary is decorated for the annual Día de los Muertos Altar Celebration and serving as the local wards' polling station.

The Fleisher Memorial continues to offer free and low-cost classes and workshops to both children and adults, in subjects such as drawing, painting, sculpture, ceramics, photography, and dance. Since 1997 they have also offered the "Community Partnership in the Arts" program which places artists in public school classrooms in South Philadelphia. Artists teach students for 90-minute classes twice a week for 6–10 weeks. Ceramist Winnie Owens-Hart is among the artists who have worked at the Memorial.

The gallery contains art by Violet Oakley, tiles by Henry Chapman Mercer, 18th-century Portuguese art, and primitive European art, as well as the religious art from the original church. There are six early stained glass windows made by Lavers, Barraud and Westlake, and one later window, designed by John LaFarge. Entrance to the gallery is free, Monday through Friday, 10 a.m. to 5 p.m. with reduced hours on Saturdays.

Every year since 2013, La Calaca Flaca and Fleisher have organized and presented a neighborhood Día de los Muertos Altar Celebration and Procession.
