= Saint Clement's Church (Philadelphia) =

Historic church in Pennsylvania, United States

- U.S. National Register of Historic Places
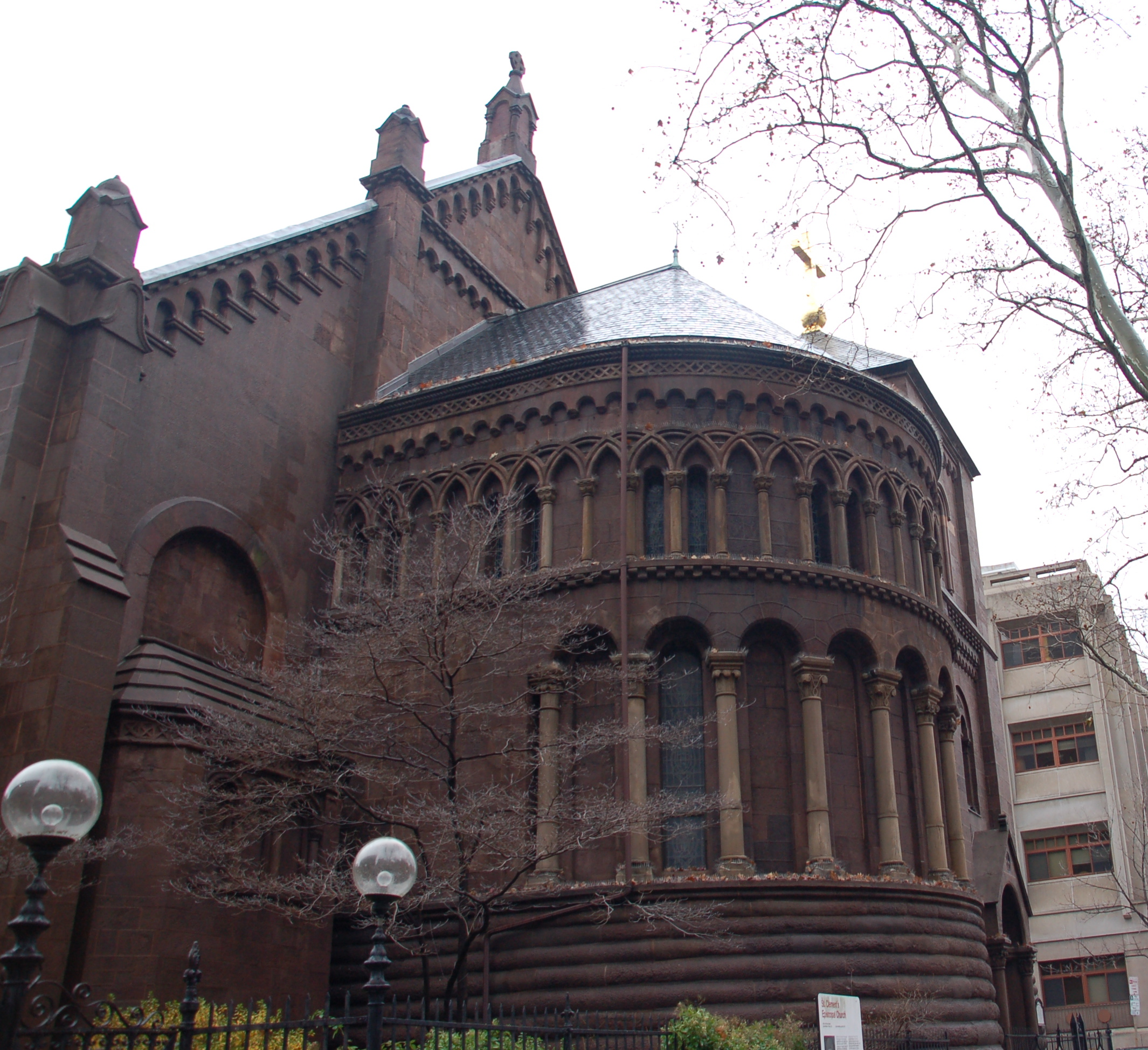
- Location: 2013 Appletree Street; Philadelphia, Pennsylvania, U.S.
- Coordinates: 39°57′22.44″N 75°10′23.62″W
- Built: 1856–1859
- Architect: John Notman
- Architectural style: Romanesque Revival
- NRHP reference No.: 70000555
- Added to NRHP: 1970

Saint Clement's Church is an historic Anglo-Catholic parish in Logan Square, Center City, Philadelphia. It is part of the Episcopal Diocese of Pennsylvania. The church, designed by architect John Notman, was built in 1856. It originally incorporated a spire more than 200 feet (61 m) tall; this was found to be too heavy for the foundation and was removed in 1869. In 1929, the church building, which includes the parish house and rectory, and weighs 5,000 short tons (4,500 t), was lifted onto steel rollers and moved 40 feet (12 m) west to allow for the widening of 20th Street. On November 20, 1970, Saint Clement's Church was listed on the National Register of Historic Places.

== History ==
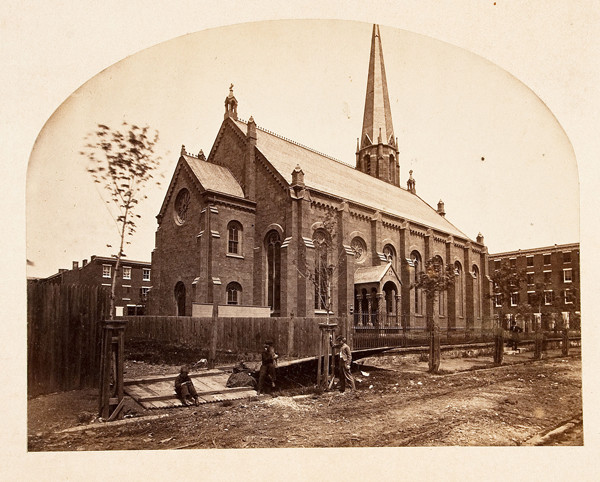
St. Clement's in an 1863 photograph. Note original tower and spire.

On September 13, 1855, a charter was granted to "The Rector, Churchwardens, and Vestrymen of St. Clement's Church in the City of Philadelphia". The first rector was the Rev. Henry S. Spackman, who was elected as soon as the first charter was received. His incumbency began officially on January 1, 1856. The cornerstone of the church building was laid on May 12, 1856, by the Rt. Rev. Alonzo Potter, third Bishop of the Diocese of Pennsylvania.

The land on which St. Clement's was built was furnished by William S. Wilson, a Presbyterian and an Englishman, who with his two brothers came to the United States and made a fortune as a manufacturer. He owned most of the land in the section of the city where St. Clement's now stands, and his interest was directed to the development of a residential area by building row houses on Arch, Race and Twentieth Streets. He was eager that a church should be built, not so much because of any religious devotion on his part, but because he felt the erection of a church would greatly enhance the attractiveness of his residential projects.

St. Clement's was the third Episcopal church to be designed by architect John Notman and built in Philadelphia between 1847 and 1859. He also designed St. Mark's Church on Locust Street, the Church of the Holy Trinity on Rittenhouse Square and, with Napoleon LeBrun, was associate architect for the Roman Catholic Cathedral of SS. Peter and Paul on Logan Square. In accordance with the architectural wisdom of the time, Notman maintained that the Gothic Revival style was best suited towards the liturgical worship of High Church congregations, while Romanesque Revival architecture was better suited for the conventional Low Church worship of mainstream Episcopal congregations. Unlike St. Mark's, which was erected for a High Church congregation and built in the Gothic Revival style, St. Clement's was originally designed for a typical Low Church Episcopal congregation, and like the Church of the Holy Trinity, was designed in the Romanesque Revival style. Like the two nearby churches, St. Clement's was built entirely of brownstone. Its bell tower was originally topped by a spire of over 200 feet (61 m) in height. The weight of the spire was more than the foundation could support, and it was removed from the structure in 1869 in order to prevent damaging the foundation.

When the cornerstone was laid St. Clement's was almost in the fields. The block between Arch and Race Streets had been, from about 1808 into the 1830s, the site of Sans Souci Garden, the largest for-profit botanical haven within the current-day confines of Center City. It included a hotel at which visitors were furnished with fruit from the garden greenhouses as part of their refreshments. The garden was respected for its botanical collection; a portion of William Hamilton's private collection—developed at the Woodlands in West Philadelphia—wound up there. The resort was also immediately south of the Magdalene Asylum (a private charitable organization for the redemption of prostitutes) and the Pennsylvania Asylum for the Blind—illustrating how such institutions were established outside of the populated sectors of the city.

In the mid-1850s, few houses yet existed nearby and large tracts of open lots surrounded the ground that had been secured for the church. The grid of streets had hardly expanded westward as far as 20th Street and there was no City Hall in the Center Square. The Pennsylvania Railroad Terminal was located at 11th and Market Streets, and there was a covered wooden bridge over the Schuylkill River.

The building of St. Clement's Church lasted three years because of recurring financial difficulties. Contemporary evidence indicates that at one time all work was stopped and the building stood roofless for a long period. It was finally opened for services on the first Sunday in January 1859. There is no record of any services for the congregation before the opening of the new building. The Church was consecrated on April 12, 1864. Bishop Potter again officiated and was assisted by Bishop Stevens, Bishop Suffragan in the Diocese, and by Bishop Lee of Delaware.

It was not until the arrival of Hermon Griswold Batterson in 1869 that the parish increasingly came to be influenced by the theology drawing on the Tractarian or Oxford Movement and later Ritualist developments. During Batterson's time as rector, the parish adopted many of the liturgical practices associated with the Catholic Revival then taking place within the Church of England. These changes, which included liturgical practices such as the wearing of colored chasubles and stoles, placing lit candles on the altar during Mass, and genuflecting before the Blessed Sacrament, together with new theological emphases, including the encouragement of private auricular confession and absolution and encouraging prayer for the dead, were not uncontroversial.

As conflict over Batterson's changes escalated, the parish became divided between two factions. The anti-Catholic low church faction was led by several vestrymen who had the public support of the diocesan bishop, William Bacon Stevens. The Anglo-Catholic faction rallied in support of Batterson as the anti-Catholic faction tried to remove him from office as rector.

Despite having the support of the ordinary as well as that of the vast majority of the people and clergy of the diocese, the anti-Catholic faction was unable to use the judicial processes prescribed in the canons to remove Batterson from office as rector, and eventually the vestry, with the support of Bishop Stevens, voted to remove Batterson (and his curate) from office without the requisite canonical trial. The manner in which Batterson was dismissed, circumventing the proper procedures after forcing the parish to endure more than a year of internal conflict, caused the anti-Catholic faction to lose significant support among parishioners. As a result, control of the vestry shifted after the annual election of vestrymen when a number of Anglo-Catholic candidates defeated the incumbent anti-Catholic vestrymen. Later in the year, the vestry elected Theodore M. Riley, an Anglo-Catholic, as the fourth rector of St. Clement's Church.

From 1875-1877 the church's organist was the prominent Philadelphia musician Henry Gordon Thunder, Sr. The catholicization of the parish continued during the tenure of the Society of St. John the Evangelist (SSJE), more commonly known as the Cowley Fathers, who were responsible for the parish from 1876 to 1891. Some maintain that the work of the Fathers and the entire St. Clement's community among the poor and needy in Philadelphia may have influenced the diocesan authorities to moderate their criticism of the "high church" parish. Father Charles Neale Field, one of the assistant priests sent to St. Clement's from Cowley in 1882, established the Guild of the Iron Cross for Working Men and Boys during this time, eventually drawing thousands of working men from all over the United States into its membership. His intent was to create a "crusade against Blasphemy, Impurity and Intemperance among working men themselves" and posed the question "Are we by our lives and teachings preaching the gospel to the poor?" The guild was a recreational as well as a religious association. The cleric from Yorkshire established the Iron Cross Parlor and Gymnasium in 1889, and he often took large groups of boys and men for outings at various parks and places out in the country. St. Clement's was located near the Baldwin Locomotive Works on Spring Garden Street and other nearby factories and workshops, so its congregation was made up of many working families whose fathers and sons were members of the Iron Cross Guild.

It has also been widely said that St. Clement's was one of the first Episcopal parishes in the city to be integrated. While direct evidence is scanty, unlike its neighboring parishes of St. Mark's and Holy Trinity and numerous other Philadelphia churches, St. Clement's never established a separate "mission church" for African-Americans. Also, Field had come to St. Clement's and established his outreach to the workers of the city having already become known for his ministry to people of color, so the church already had a long tradition of tolerance and inclusion.

Meanwhile, one long cherished wish of Father Basil Maturin, rector from 1881 to 1889, and his assistant priests, was for the establishment of a hospital for adults. Beginning the work by opening a dispensary in a nearby house in 1885, the plan was to have evening hours so that the working people could benefit. The only requirement for treatment was to be poor and sick. By 1890, the hospital facility had moved to Cherry Street and expanded its services beyond the capacity of the parish to sustain them financially. After a brief period of retrenchment and use of the hospital exclusively to treat epileptics, in 1899 the building was sold to the Community of the All Saints Sisters of the Poor, to be used as a mission house.

The Cowley Fathers withdrew from St. Clement's in 1891 to focus their American work and ministry in Boston and, in 1895, the Rev. George Herbert Moffett became rector. His coming ushered in a new era of prosperity for the church. He built the present clergy house; began perpetual reservation of the Blessed Sacrament in the crypt chapel; was the first to use the term "Mass" officially in the parish; put the first side altar in the church, and moved the baptistry from the head of the south aisle to the rear of the north aisle. Moffett served until his death in 1904. In 1895, Saint Clement's became the first parish in the Diocese of Pennsylvania to institute perpetual reservation of the Blessed Sacrament.

The latter part of the 20th century saw a significant change in the church congregation as the nearby factories and other industrial and commercial establishments closed, families moved to the suburbs or farther away, and the parish neighborhood changed profoundly. St. Clement's evolved from a parish church to a shrine church, its outreach and membership becoming more regional and its pews filled on great feast days with worshippers often traveling great distances to partake of the traditional Masses that have continued.

== Architecture ==
The location and orientation of the site on which St. Clement's was built posed a significant problem for the design of the church. The west end of the site, where the main façade and doors would typically be located, was in the middle of a city block. For Notman, the easy solution would have been to reverse the church, erecting the main entrance on the east side of the lot and the apse on the west side. However, this would have altered the eastward orientation of the building. Instead, Notman retained the apse on the east side of the church and incorporated it into the main façade.

The main façade is dominated by the bell tower and the assertive semi-circular apse, with a blind arcade of simple columns and Romanesque arches. The blind arcade is broken at both ends by large stained glass windows. Just north of the apse exists the bell tower, which was originally topped by a spire of over 200 feet in height. The weight of the spire was more than the foundation could support, and it was removed from the structure in 1869 in order to prevent damaging the foundation.

The nave of the church has a rectangular floor plan. The windows are contained within arched bays in the Romanesque style. Buttresses, topped by gablets with decorative carved reverse ogee arches, separate each bay. Both the roof of the nave and of the apse are of gray slate. Along the ridge of the nave roof at both the east and west ends exist cupolas of carved brownstone, each surmounted by a carved stone cross.

In the early 20th century, the roof of the apse was raised some 15 feet (4.6 m) with the installation of a clerestory. This renovation was necessary in order to accommodate the installation of the triptych that currently stands above the high altar. While the clerestory windows mirror the Romanesque arches of the blind arcade, the elaborate exterior stonework above the clerestory windows incorporates forms found in both Gothic and Romanesque styles. Also completed about this time was the complete rebuilding of the roof and roof trusses of the nave, the original having been proved to be significantly deteriorated and unsafe.

In 1929 the City of Philadelphia undertook a project to widen North 20th Street by some 40 feet (12 m). St. Clement's Church was in the middle of the proposed expansion. Facing the prospect of having to demolish the church, the vestry undertook a project to move it. The two houses to the immediate west of the church (at 2028 and 2030 Cherry St.) were acquired and demolished, and the 5,000-short-ton (4,500 t) structure was raised onto steel beams, moved 40 feet (12 m) to the west, and placed onto a newly built foundation. The move itself took place between July 11 and July 16, 1929.

The interior of the church is dominated by the large carved oak reredos and triptych, installed in 1908, which stand above the high altar. The central panel of the triptych depicts Christ on the cross, clothed in the vestments of the Holy Sacrifice of the Mass, with the Blessed Virgin Mary and Saint John the Apostle at the foot of the cross. South of the sanctuary is the Lady Chapel, which features an altar and reredos of English red stone. The central niche of the reredos contains a statue of the Virgin and Child while the two side niches contain statues of Saint Joseph and Saint Elizabeth with Saint John the Baptist. Located in the nave, the Shrine of Our Lady of Clemency climbs to a height of some 25 feet (7.6 m) and features a statue of the Blessed Virgin depicted as Queen of Heaven replete with crown and sceptre. The nave also contains shrines dedicated to the church's major patron, Pope Clement I, pope from 88-97 AD, and to the church's minor patron, Saint Catherine of Alexandria.

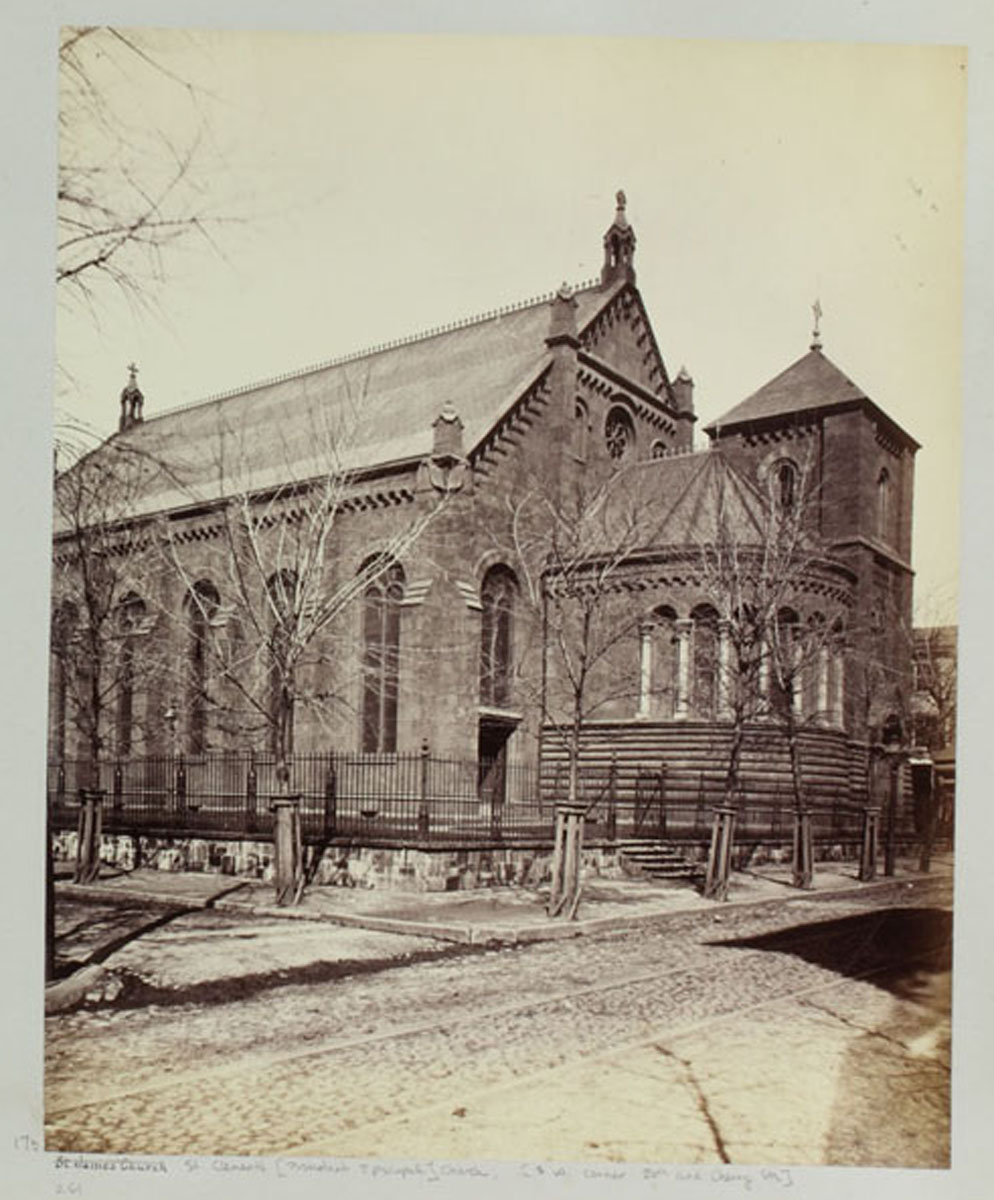
St. Clement's Church circa 1870, after removal of the spire

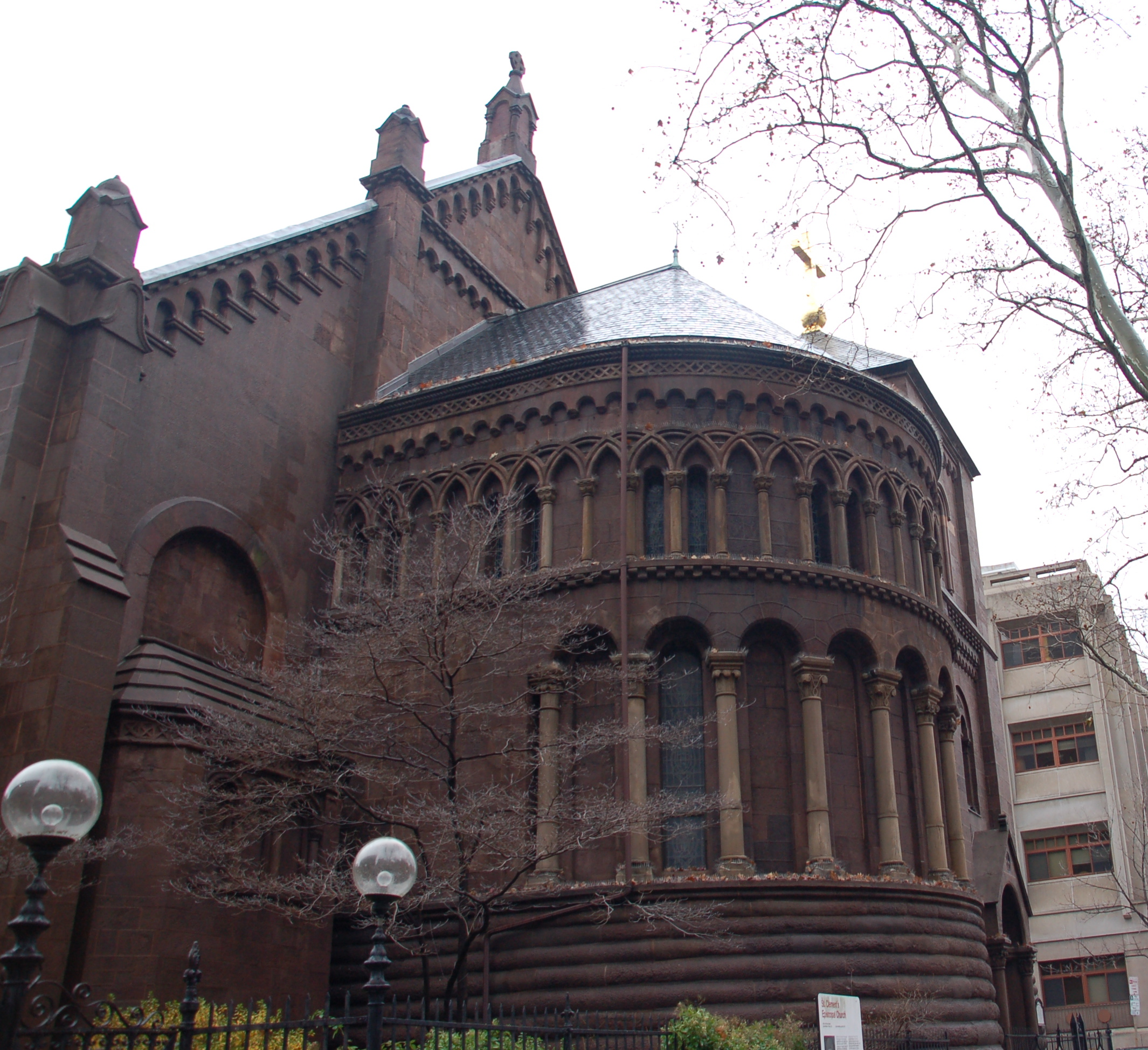
St. Clement's in 2008. Note increased height of the apse.

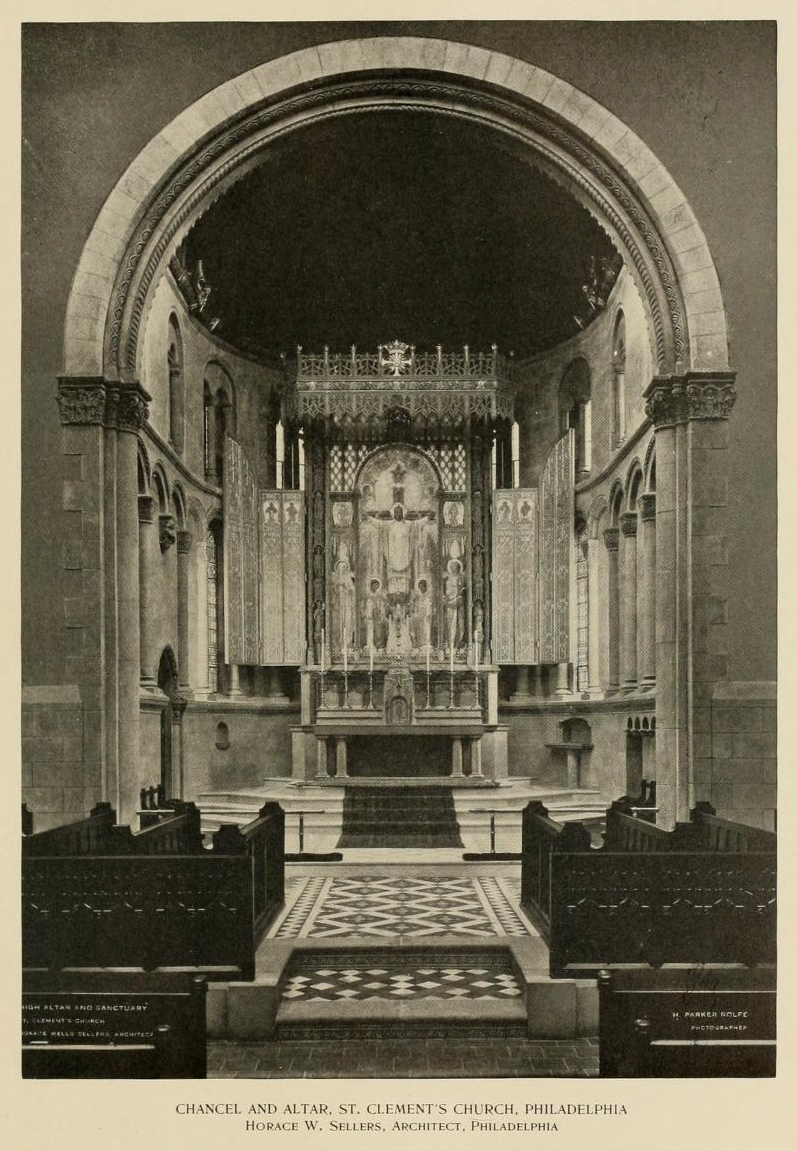
The height of the chancel apse was increased in 1909.

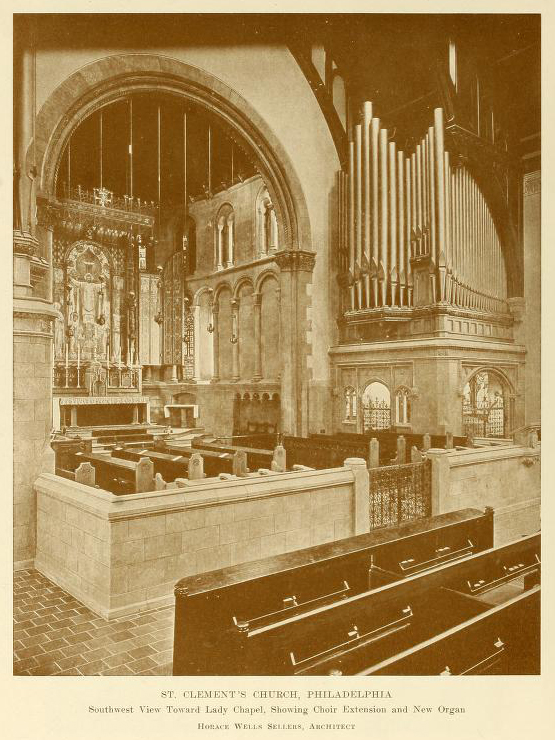
Choir and Lady Chapel

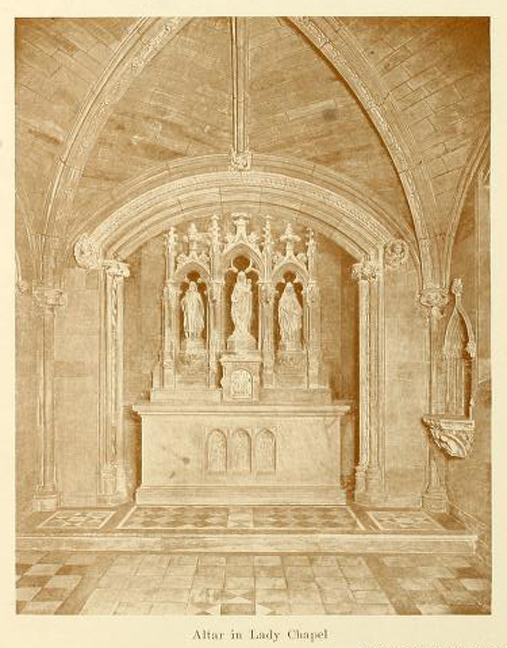
Altar in Lady Chapel

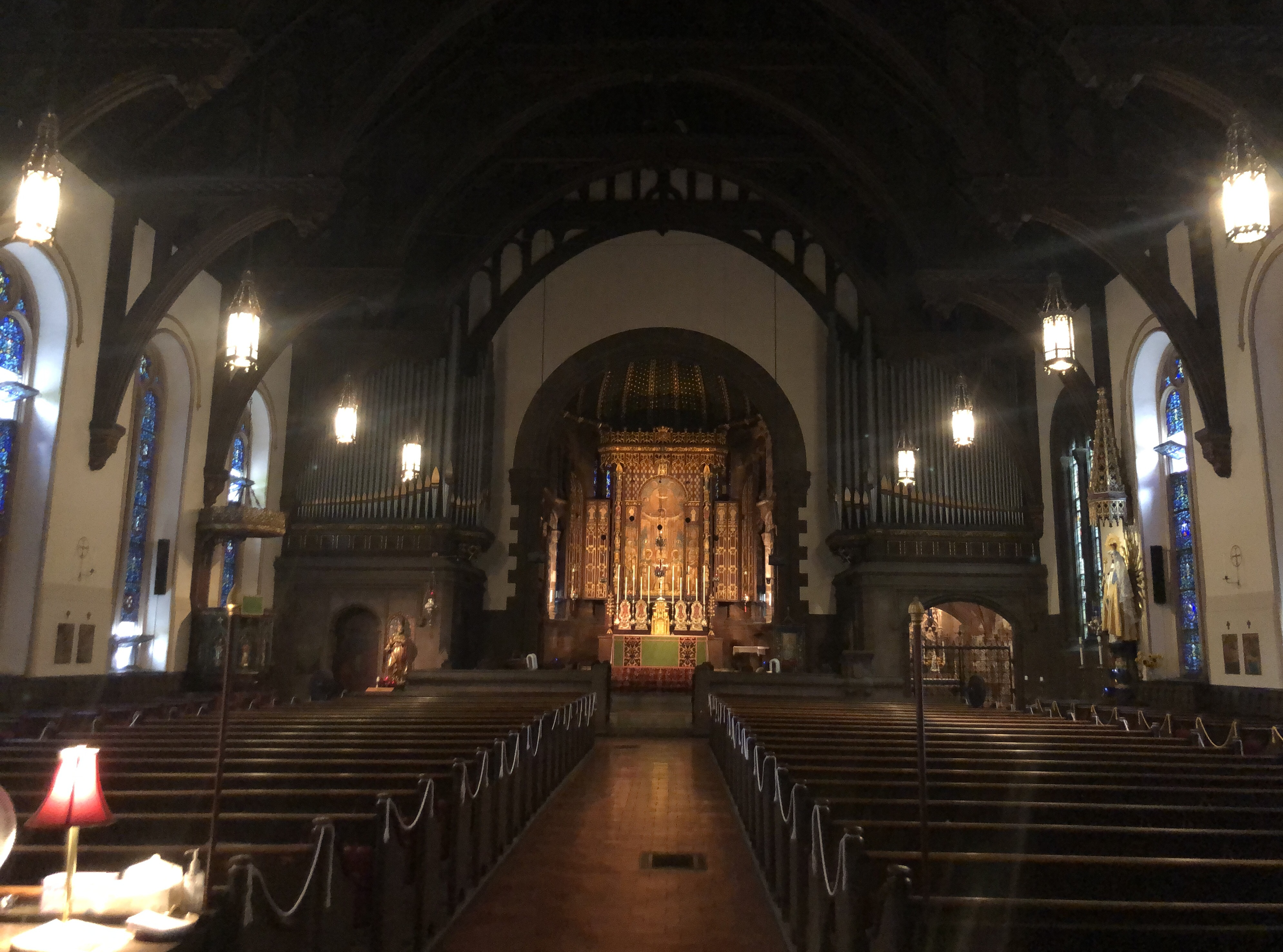
Interior view, showing the altar, in 2022

== Liturgy and music ==
Saint Clement's uses the English Missal, an English-language translation of the Tridentine Mass as it existed prior to the 1955 liturgical reforms of Pope Pius XII. Today, Low Mass is offered every day, using a liturgy based on the Anglican Missal and 1928 Book of Common Prayer. A High Mass or Sung Mass is celebrated every Sunday of the year and on most major feasts. From Monday through Saturday, Evening Prayer is recited according to the 1928 prayer book, followed by the novena prayers at the Shrine of Our Lady of Clemency.

The church's four manual, 51 rank pipe organ is Austin Organ Company Opus 507, which was originally installed in 1914.

== Rectors ==
1. Henry S. Spackman, 1856–1863
2. Treadwell Walden, 1863–1868
3. Hermon Griswold Batterson, 1869–1872
4. Theodore M. Riley, 1872–1875
5. Oliver Sherman Prescott SSJE, 1876–1881
6. Basil W. Maturin SSJE, 1881–1889
7. Duncan Convers SSJE, 1889–1891
8. John Metcalf Davenport, 1891–1893
9. Alfred Bowyer Sharpe, 1893–1895
10. George Herbert Moffett, March 1895 – November, 1904
11. Charles S. Hutchinson, 1905–1920
12. Franklin Joiner, 1920–1955
13. William Elwell, 1955–1964
14. Edward Oscar Hendricks, 1965–1978
15. Francis C. FitzHugh, SSC, 1979–1984
16. Peter Laister, 1986–1993
17. Barry E. B. Swain SSC 1993–2001
18. W. Gordon Reid, 2004–2014
19. Richard C. Alton, 2014–2024
20. The Rev. J. Brent Bates, rector elect

== See also ==
- List of Registered Historic Places in Philadelphia, Pennsylvania
- William W. Gilchrist, organist and choirmaster at St. Clement's, 1871
- Church of the Annunciation, Philadelphia
- Yarnall Library of Theology
