= Watson & Huckel =

Practice information
- Partners: Frank Rushmore Watson; Samuel Huckel
- Founded: 1902
- Dissolved: 1917
- Location: Philadelphia

Significant works and honors
- Buildings: Worcester Union Station; Cumberland County Courthouse; Monmouth Hotel

Watson & Huckel was an architectural firm from Philadelphia that existed as a partnership between Frank Rushmore Watson and Samuel Huckel between 1902 and 1917. The firm was known as a prolific office that had many church commissions—Watson specialized in church architecture and Huckel worked with him until 1917, the year of his (Huckel's) death; the pair worked on many projects from Worcester Union Station to the Cumberland County Courthouse and a great deal of churches. During the early years of their partnership, Watson and Huckel maintained a New York office, however few projects were listed out of that office and they did eventually close it.

== See also ==
- Frank Rushmore Watson
- Samuel Huckel
