= Basil Maturin =

Irish writer and priest (1847–1915)

Basil William Maturin
- Born: Basil William Maturin; 15 February 1847; Ireland, United Kingdom
- Died: 7 May 1915 (aged 68); RMS Lusitania, Atlantic Ocean
- Occupations: Priest, preacher, writer
- Relatives: Charles Maturin (grandfather); Oscar Wilde (second cousin)

Basil William Maturin (15 February 1847 – 7 May 1915) was an Irish-born Anglican priest, preacher and writer who later became Catholic. He died on board the RMS Lusitania, during the First World War.

== Life ==
He was born in Ireland in 1847 to William Basil and Jane (Cook) Maturin and educated at Trinity College, Dublin; he was a grandson of writer Charles Maturin and a second cousin of Oscar Wilde. After going on retreat with the Cowley Fathers (the Society of St. John the Evangelist), Maturin decided to join their order. In 1876, he was sent to Philadelphia, where he was the rector of Saint Clement's Church. In 1879, Maturin headed a controversial mission at Mount Calvary Church in Baltimore, which resulted in the publication of a pamphlet that protested the mission's "Romish practices". Maturin became a Catholic in 1897 and was ordained by his friend Herbert Vaughan in 1898. Maturin was also author of several books on religious and psychological topics, including Some Principles and Practices of the Spiritual Life (1896), Practical Studies on the Parables of Our Lord (1899), Self-Knowledge and Self-Discipline (1905, later abridged as Christian Self-Mastery), Laws of the Spiritual Life (1907) and The Price of Unity (1912).

In 1913 he was appointed the Catholic chaplain to the University of Oxford. In 1915, at the age of 68, he made a successful preaching tour of the United States, booking a return passage on the Cunard Line's RMS Lusitania. He was among the 1,198 victims when the Lusitania was torpedoed and sunk on 7 May 1915 by a German submarine.
