= Old Trinity Church =

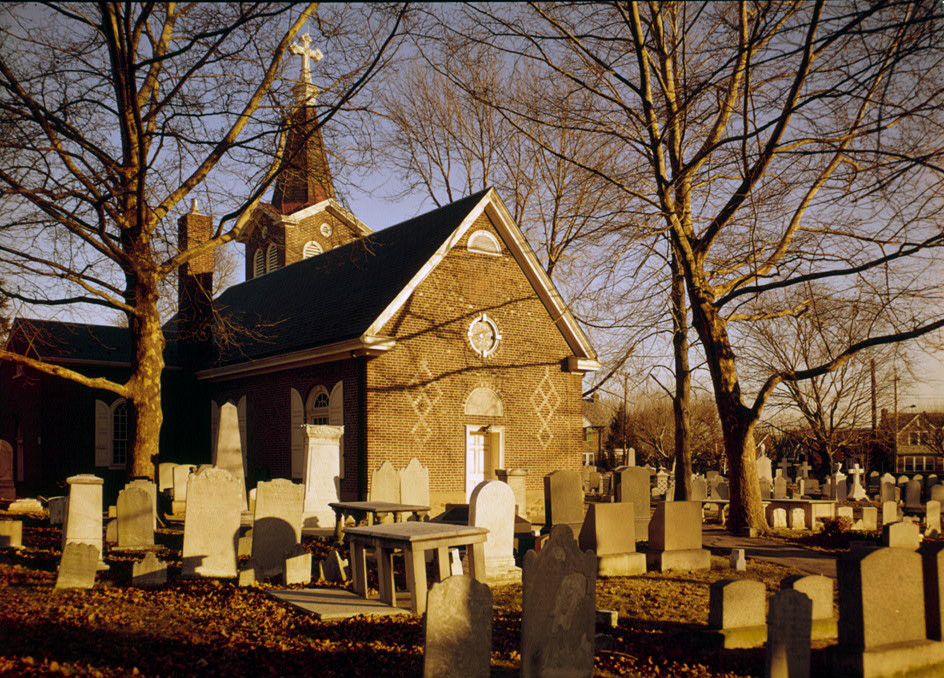
- Old Trinity Church from the Historic American Buildings Survey
- Old Trinity Church
- 40°3′16″N 75°5′11″W
- Location: 601 Longshore Ave. Philadelphia, Pennsylvania 19111; Philadelphia, Pennsylvania

History
- Founded: 1696

Old Trinity Church, also known as Trinity Church, Oxford, is a historic Episcopal church established in 1696 located in Oxford Township, Pennsylvania, which is now part of Philadelphia.

== Building history ==
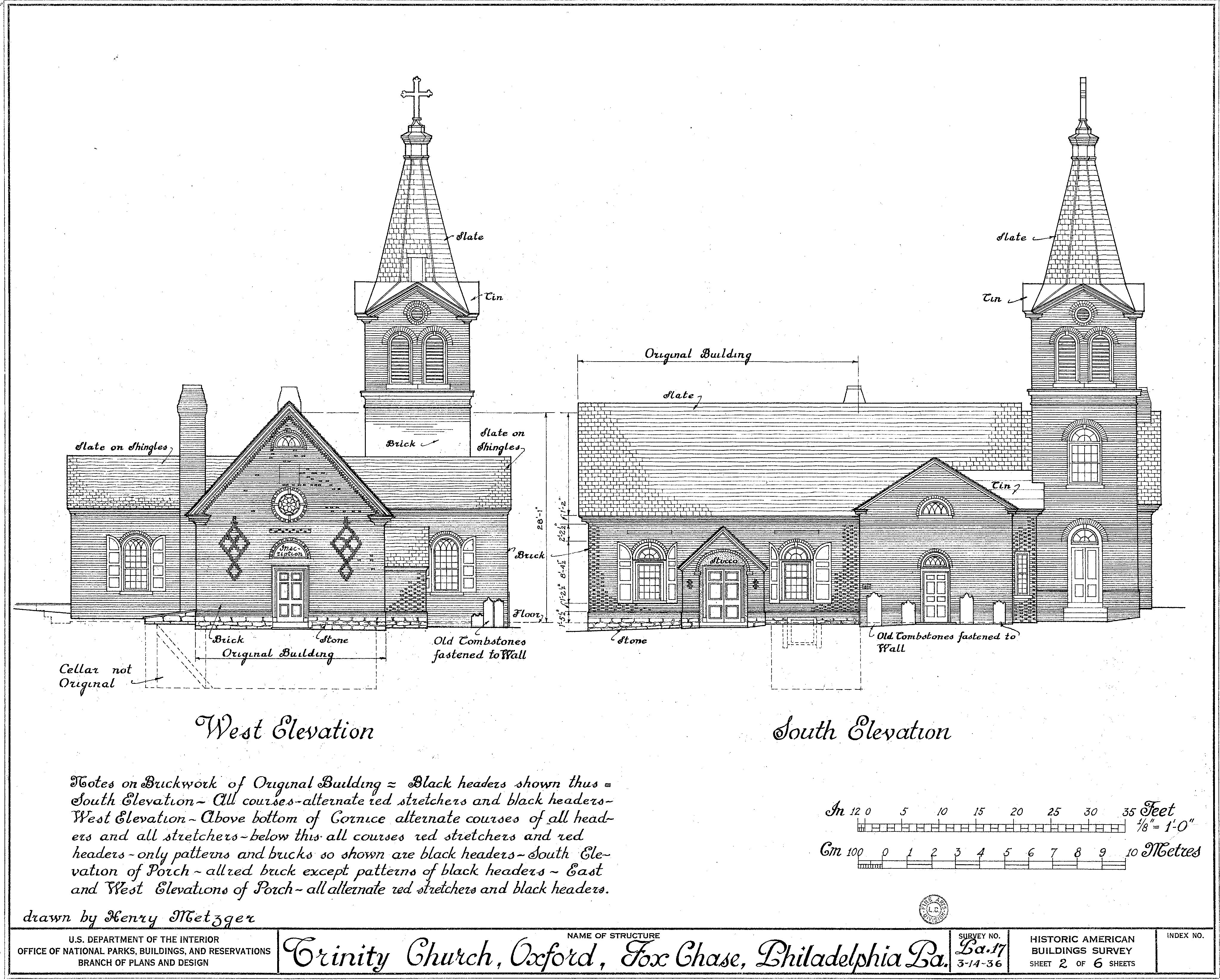
HABS architectural drawing

Church of England services were first held on the site in 1696 in a Quaker meeting house of log construction, built about 1684. The present building was erected in 1711 of red and black brick believed to have been ballast from ships brought from England.

In 1759, the pews were installed. In 1807, the flooring was completed, and the entrance was moved from the north side to the west end. In 1833, the transepts were added, and in 1839, a tower was built at the west entrance.

The present corner tower and belfry were added in 1875, designed by the architectural firm of Furness & Hewitt. Interior alterations were made at the same time. Minor additions were made in 1932.

== Congregation and pastors ==
A log meetinghouse was built by teenagers John and Rees Price, who along with their step-mother resettled their from the Welsh Merion Meeting. They are buried in the churchyard, considered a Sabbathist Landmark. The family sailed from England in the Lyon, part of William Penn's Fleet for religious freedom. Oxford Meeting records are on file in Quaker records. They abruptly end in 1696 when almost the entire congregation converted to Anglican. Quaker history notes it is the only known instance of this happening. The cause of this is attributed to Radical Quaker George Keith who later was ordained Church of England. Keith returned to preach at Trinity two more times. Thomas Clayton is considered the first minister of Trinity. He died in 1698 and baptized over 500 persons in the area. Andreas (Andrew) Rudman was also an early preacher, formerly of Old Swedes Church in Philadelphia.Trinity Oxford is in possession of a prayer book send over from the Society for the Propagation of the Gospel in Foreign Lands, dated 1705. This possibly was brought over by George Keith who was involved in the establishment of the Society.

The Rev. John Clubb, who served in 1705, and later the Rev. Robert Weyman, who served during the 1720s, were paid a stipend to preach in the Welsh Language at Radnor, about 20 miles to the west. This was very arduous especially in the Winter. The Rev. John Clubb only lasted a year and died doing so. The ministers were always paid and provided for by the congregation. The Church of England would not provide a Bishop to the Colony. This prevented ordinations and proper blessing of the new church building.

In 1713, Queen Anne presented a silver communion set to the congregation inscribed "Annae Reginae" is still used on special occasions.

Among the church's rectors were Rev. Aeneas Ross, 1742–1758, brother of George Ross, a signer of the Declaration of Independence and father-in-law of Betsy Ross; the Rev. Dr. William Smith, 1766–1779 and 1791–1798, who founded, and served as the first Provost of, the College of Philadelphia (afterward the University of Pennsylvania); the Rev. John Henry Hobart, 1798–1801, who became Bishop of New York and founded Hobart College; and Edward Young Buchanan, 1854–1882, brother of President James Buchanan.

The church was admitted to the Convention of the Episcopal Diocese of Pennsylvania in 1786 following the American Revolutionary War.
