= Cumberland County Courthouse (New Jersey) =

Historic courthouse in New Jersey, United States

- U.S. National Register of Historic Places
- U.S. National Historic Landmark District – Contributing property
- New Jersey Register of Historic Places
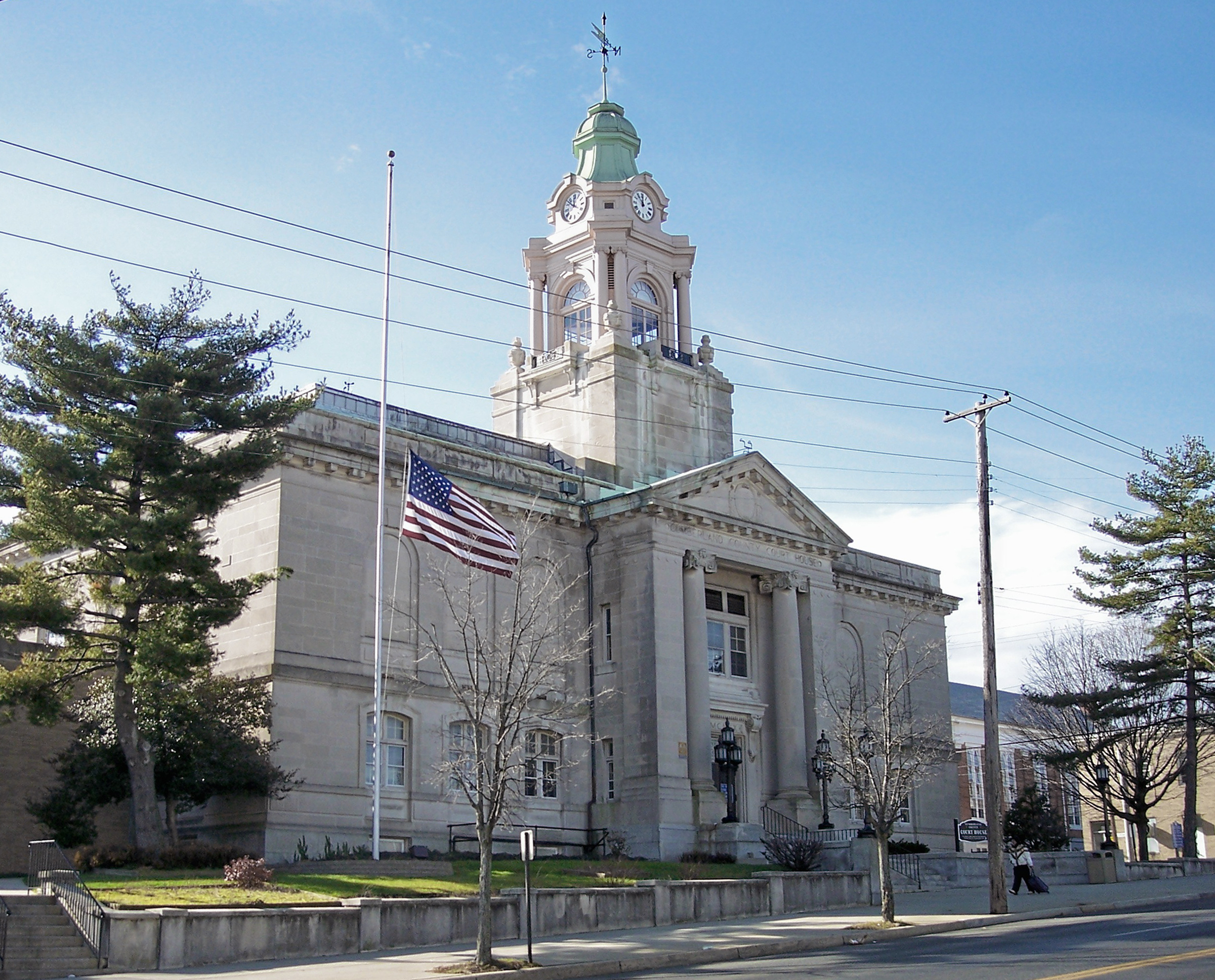

- Location within Cumberland County, New Jersey Location within New Jersey Location within the United States
- Location: Roughly bounded by RR Tracks, South Avenue, Lake, Commerce, Water, Belmont, Cohensey, and Penn Streets, Bridgeton, New Jersey
- Coordinates: 39°25′39″N 75°14′21″W
- Area: 616 acres (249 ha)
- Architect: Multiple
- Architectural style: Late Victorian
- Part of: Bridgeton Historic District (ID82001043)
- NRHP reference No.: 82001043
- NJRHP No.: 1020

Significant dates
- Added to NRHP: October 29, 1982
- Designated NJRHP: February 22, 1982

The Cumberland County Courthouse is the historic traditional courthouse for Cumberland County, New Jersey, located in the county seat of Bridgeton in the 15th vicinage. It was designed by Watson & Huckel and built in 1909. It is a contributing property to the Bridgeton Historic District listed in 1982 on the New Jersey Register of Historic Places (#1020) and the National Register of Historic Places (#82001043). Funding for its restoration has been partially provided by the New Jersey Historic Trust.

== See also ==
- County courthouses in New Jersey
- Richard J. Hughes Justice Complex
- Federal courthouses in New Jersey
- National Register of Historic Places listings in Cumberland County, New Jersey
