= Monmouth Hotel =

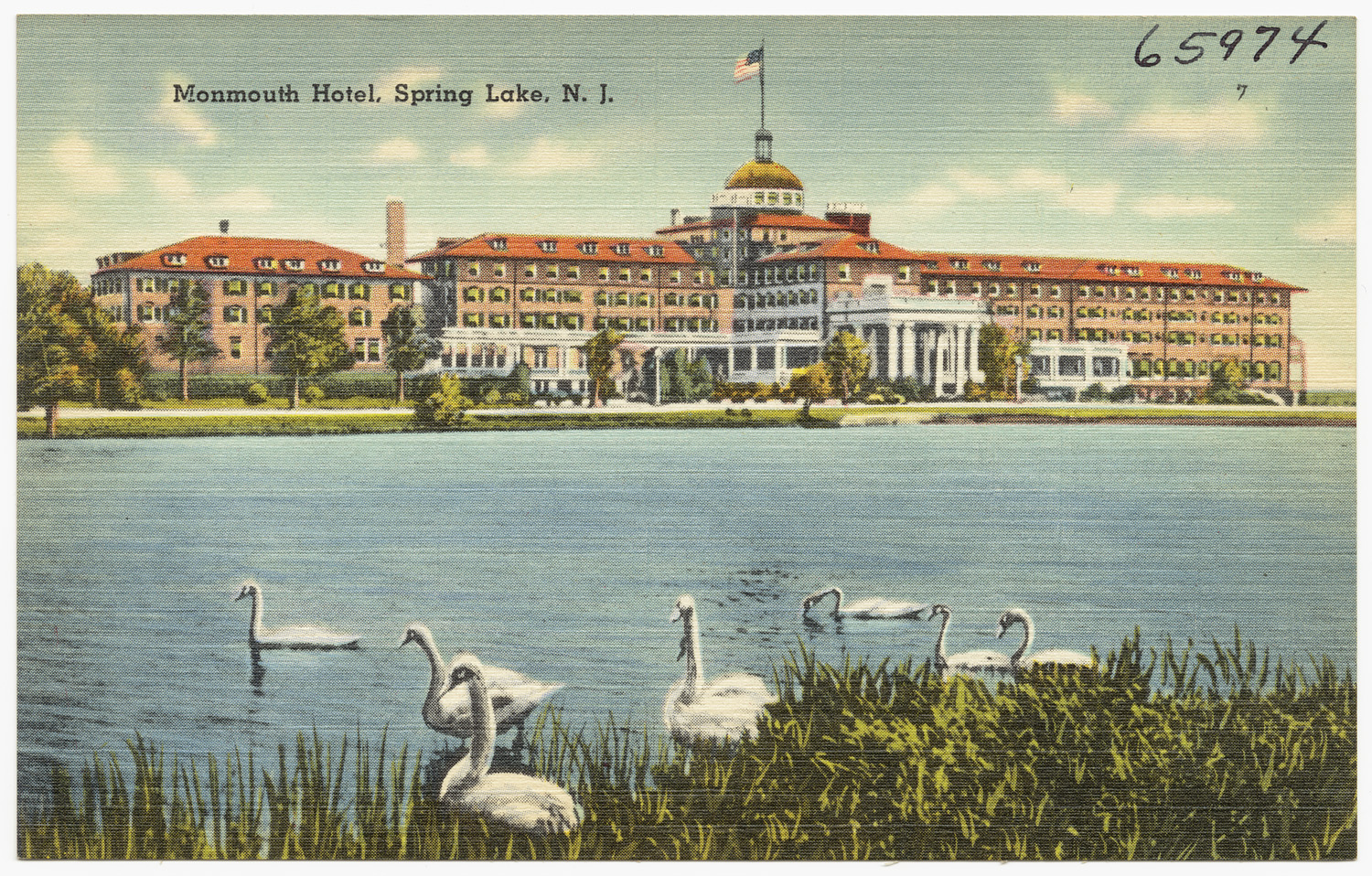

General information
- Location: Spring Lake, New Jersey, U.S.
- Opened: 1875
- Demolished: March 13, 1975

The Monmouth Hotel was a hotel in Spring Lake, New Jersey. The hotel first opened in 1875 as the Monmouth House. It was destroyed in 1900 by a fire, and rebuilt afterwards, opening again in 1904.
