= Edward Harding MacBurney =

American bishop (1927–2022)

Edward MacBurney
- VII Bishop of Quincy
- Church: The Episcopal Church (until 2009), Anglican Church in North America (2009-2022)
- See: Episcopal Diocese of Quincy
- In office: 1988–1994
- Predecessor: Donald J. Parsons
- Successor: Keith Ackerman
- Previous posts: Dean of Trinity Cathedral, Davenport

Orders
- Ordination: December 1952 by Edward Wynn, OGS, Bishop of Ely
- Consecration: January 16, 1988 by Edmond L. Browning
- Rank: 823 in the American Succession

Personal details
- Born: October 30, 1927 Albany, New York, U.S.
- Died: March 17, 2022 (aged 94)

Edward Harding "Ed" MacBurney SSC (October 30, 1927 – March 17, 2022) was an American Anglican bishop. He was born in Albany, New York to Alfred Cadwell MacBurney (1896-1986) and Florence Marion McDowell MacBurney (1897-1989). A graduate of Dartmouth College (BA 1949), Berkeley Divinity School (STB 1952), and St Stephen's House, Oxford, he was ordained to the priesthood in December 1952 by the Church of England Bishop of Ely Edward Wynn. He served in the Episcopal Diocese of New Hampshire at St. Thomas Episcopal Church, Hanover, from 1953 to 1973 before appointment as dean of Trinity Episcopal Cathedral in Davenport, Iowa from 1973 to 1987. MacBurney served from 1988 to 1994 as the seventh bishop of the Episcopal Diocese of Quincy. During the consents process following MacBurney's election, Bishop John Shelby Spong of the Episcopal Diocese of Newark "urged his fellow liberal bishops to encourage their diocesan standing committees to confirm Dean MacBurney's election for the sake of the catholicity of the Church."

He was consecrated at the former Cathedral Church of St. Paul in Peoria, Illinois on January 16, 1988, by Presiding Bishop Edmond L. Browning with Bishop William L. Stevens of the Episcopal Diocese of Fond du Lac and Bishop George E. Bates of the Episcopal Diocese of Utah.

In 1991, MacBurney refused to discipline Peoria cathedral dean John Backus during his criminal proceedings and conviction for child pornography possession. Backus claimed at his 1991 arrest following a maid's discovery in his bedroom of videos and photographs of children engaged in sex acts that the material had been given to him by other priests in Montana and Washington struggling with child pornography addiction. Backus declined to name them, citing the seal of the confessional. After the dean's conviction, MacBurney transferred him to the Episcopal Diocese of New York, where The New York Times covered the matter three times in 2002.

On April 2, 2008, MacBurney was inhibited from ministry by the Presiding Bishop of the Episcopal Church, Katharine Jefferts Schori, over charges of celebrating confirmations in an Episcopal diocese without permission of the local bishop. On September 9, 2008, the Presiding Bishop removed Bishop MacBurney's inhibition after he apologized for accepting an invitation from Anglican Province of the Southern Cone Archbishop Gregory Venables to conduct confirmations in California. In June 2009, it was announced that Jefferts Schori had accepted MacBurney's renunciations of his vows to the Episcopal Church; he later transferred as a retired bishop to the Anglican Church in North America (ACNA). In the ACNA, Bishop MacBurney served as Assistant Bishop of Fort Worth in the consecrations of Bishop William Ilgenfritz in 2009 and suffragan James Randall Hiles in 2013.

In 1991, he was appointed a trustee of Nashotah House Theological Seminary, which had awarded him an honorary Doctorate of Divinity in 1988. Bishop MacBurney was a trustee of Berkeley Divinity School from 1964 to 1970, of St. Luke's Hospital, Davenport from 1973 to 1987; of the National Organization Episcopalians for Life from 1991 until his death, and vice president of the former Episcopal Synod of America from 1988 until its 1999 transition into Forward in Faith North America.

== Personal life ==
On February 20, 1965, he married Anne Farnsworth Grubb, and adopted her three sons. She predeceased him on February 29, 2016, in Bettendorf, Iowa.

== See also ==
- Anglican realignment
- Diocese of Quincy (ACNA)
- Episcopal Diocese of Quincy
- Forward in Faith

Episcopal Church (USA) titles
Preceded by Donald J. Parsons	VII Bishop of Quincy; 1988–1994	Succeeded by Keith Ackerman
