= Camp Webb =

Summer camp program in Wisconsin, US

Camp Webb is a summer camp program run by the Episcopal Diocese of Milwaukee.

Programs include week-long sessions for campers age 7–17, including a Senior High program for high school students, and shortened sessions for younger campers.

The program began in 1960 on the grounds of Nashotah House Theological Seminary near Nashotah, Wisconsin, but was moved in 1962 to a new 160-acre site on the shores of Little Hills Lake near Wautoma, Wisconsin, formerly known as Woodcraft Camp. There, at "God's lake-front home" generations of campers and staff enjoyed Christian fellowship, growth and community for 46 years until the Diocese of Milwaukee sold this site for $1.7 million in 2008. The Little Hills Lake property is now run as a private camp called Camp Lakotah.

Since 2009 the diocese has run a scaled-back camping program renting facilities at various summer camps in Wisconsin for 2–3 weeks at a time.
