= Diocese of Quincy =

Diocese of Quincy may refer to:

- Diocese of Quincy (ACNA), a diocese of the Anglican Church in North America
- Episcopal Diocese of Quincy, a now-defunct diocese of the Episcopal Church that merged into the Episcopal Diocese of Chicago
- Diocese of Quincy, the former name of Roman Catholic Diocese of Springfield in Illinois
