= St. John's Parish (Quincy, Illinois) =

Anglican cathedral in the United States

Coordinates: 39°56′01″N 91°24′16″W

St. John's Anglican Parish and Cathedral
- Location: 701 Hampshire Street, Quincy, Illinois
- Country: United States
- Denomination: Anglican Church in North America
- Website: stjohnsquincy.com

History
- Founded: 1837
- Founder: Philander Chase

Architecture
- Architect: Charles Howland
- Style: Gothic Revival
- Years built: 1843-1853

Administration
- Diocese: Diocese of Quincy

Clergy
- Bishop: The Rt. Rev. Juan Alberto Morales
- Dean: The Very Rev. Patrick Smith
- St. John's Parish
- U.S. Historic district – Contributing property
- Part of: Downtown Quincy Historic District (ID83000298)
- Added to NRHP: April 7, 1983

St. John's Anglican Cathedral is the designated cathedral and mother church of the Anglican Diocese of Quincy, located at 701 Hampshire Avenue in Quincy, Illinois. Established in 1837 as the first Anglican/Episcopal church in Quincy, its current building dates to 1853 and is a contributing property to the Downtown Quincy Historic District. The building is the oldest existing church in Quincy.

== History ==
St. John's was founded in 1837 after a visit from Philander Chase, the missionary Episcopal Bishop of Illinois, who visited Quincy to officiate at services in the then-frontier town of less than 1,000 residents on the Mississippi River. After Chase's visit, 20 Quincy residents gathered to form a parochial association for a new church named after St. John the Baptist. A frame church was erected on North Sixth Street, between Hampshire and Vermont, a block from the current location, and Chase consecrated the building on June 24, 1838, the Nativity of John the Baptist.

In 1844, congregants chose the current site at 701 Hampshire as the location for a new church building. Architect Charles Howland designed an early Gothic revival edifice that was built with native limestone, completed in the 1850s. In 1877, the Diocese of Quincy was formed from the western area of the Episcopal Diocese of Illinois, and St. John's was designated as the cathedral.

In 1962, the diocese moved its headquarters to Peoria and designated St. Paul's Episcopal Church as the cathedral. St. John's would again become cathedral after St. Paul's elected to join the Episcopal Diocese of Quincy as part of the Anglican realignment.

St. John's Parish experienced a split in 1994, when a majority of the parish objected to the direction of the Episcopal Church and departed to affiliate with the Anglican Church in America. This group formed a new church, also called St. John's and also designated the cathedral of the ACA Diocese of the Missouri Valley. It occupies a building on the south side of Quincy of modern construction but design similar to the historic St. John's Parish.

== Worship ==
As part of the Diocese of Quincy, St. John's Parish is on the high church end of the Anglican spectrum. It offers a spoken Eucharist at 8:30 a.m. and a sung Eucharist family service at 10:30 a.m. St. John's uses the ACNA 2019 Book of Common Prayer.

== Architecture ==
The church, designed in an early Gothic revival style, was built of native, uncoursed limestone and measures 75 feet by 40 feet. A rear and side chancel were added after the primary church building was constructed in the 1850s. The bell tower includes 11 bells and is the only true carillon in Quincy.

The church interior includes a reredos designed by Ralph Adams Cram and two stained glass windows crafted by Louis Comfort Tiffany.
