= Samuel Prakash =

Indian Continuing Anglican bishop

The Most Reverend Samuel Prakash
- Metropolitan of the Anglican Church of India; Former primate of the Traditional Anglican Communion
- Church: Anglican Church of India
- In office: 1984 - present
- Predecessor: John Hepworth (TAC primate)

Orders
- Consecration: 6 October 1984

Samuel Peter Prakash is an Indian bishop. He is the current archbishop and metropolitan of the Anglican Church of India (CIBC), a continuing Anglican church which is part of the Traditional Anglican Church and outside of the Anglican Communion.

Prakash was consecrated as a bishop of the Anglican Church of India on 6 October 1984 at the YMCA Hall in New Delhi by Louis Falk, assisted by James Orin Mote and John Asa Prakash. He was initially assigned as the bishop ordinary for Lucknow, India. He was appointed as the acting primate of the Traditional Anglican Communion on 1 March 2012, a post he held until 2017, when he was succeeded by Archbishop Shane B. Janzen as the third primate.

Religious titles
Preceded by John Hepworth	Primate of the Traditional Anglican Communion; 2012–2017	Succeeded by Shane B. Jenzen
