= Elizabeth Adams =

Elizabeth Adams may refer to:

- A. Elizabeth Adams (1892–1962), American zoologist
- Elizabeth Adams (madam) (1933 or 1934–1995), known as Madam Alex, Hollywood madam
- Elizabeth Laura Adams (1909–1982), African-American Catholic writer
- Elizabeth Nelson Adams (1941–2020), American artist and writer
- Elizabeth Sparks Adams (1911–2007), American historian
- Elizabeth Kemper Adams (1872–1948), American psychologist and historian of education
- Elizabeth McCord (character), born Elizabeth Adams and goes by "Elizabeth Adams McCord"
