= M. Edward Fawcett =

Bishop of the Episcopal Diocese of Quincy

The Right Reverend M. Edward Fawcett S.T.D., Ph.D.
- Bishop of Quincy
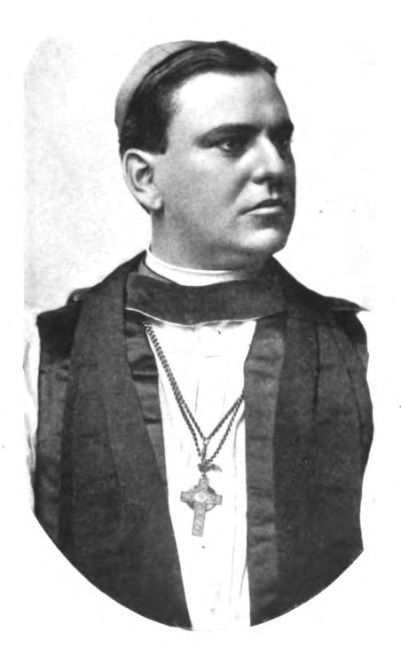
- Church: Episcopal Church
- Diocese: Quincy
- Elected: May 20, 1903
- In office: 1904–1935
- Predecessor: Frederick W. Taylor
- Successor: William Leopold Essex

Orders
- Ordination: December 15, 1897 by William Edward McLaren
- Consecration: January 20, 1904 by Daniel S. Tuttle

Personal details
- Born: November 1, 1865 New Hartford, Iowa, United States
- Died: September 17, 1935 (aged 69) Quincy, Illinois, United States
- Buried: Graceland Cemetery
- Denomination: Anglican
- Parents: William Fawcett & Sarah Houghton
- Spouse: Esther Luvina Faul
- Children: 3
- Education: Upper Iowa University

M. Edward Fawcett (November 1, 1865 – September 17, 1935) was an American prelate who served as the third Bishop of Quincy in the Episcopal Church.

== Early life and education ==
Fawcett was born on November 1, 1865, in New Hartford, Iowa, the son of William Fawcett and Sarah Houghton. He studied at the Upper Iowa University and graduated with a Bachelor of Arts in 1886, a Master of Arts in 1889, and a Doctor of Philosophy in 1893. He studied theology at the Garrett–Evangelical Theological Seminary, and received a Doctor of Sacred Theology from Nashotah House in 1904. He married Esther L. Faul of Chicago, on November 3, 1887, and together had 2 daughters and one son, two of whom died young.

== Ordained ministry ==
Fawcett was ordained deacon on May 20, 1897, and priest on December 15 of the same year, both by Bishop William Edward McLaren of Chicago. He then became rector of the Church of the Redeemer in Elgin, Illinois. In 1901 he transferred to St Bartholomew's Church in Chicago, where he remained till 1904.

== Bishop ==
On May 20, 1903, Fawcett was elected as the third Bishop of Quincy on the thirteenth ballot. He was consecrated on January 20, 1904, by Presiding Bishop Daniel S. Tuttle. He died in office on September 17, 1935.
