= William Leopold Essex =

American bishop (1886–1959)

The Right Reverend William Leopold Essex S.T.D., D.D.
- Bishop of Quincy
- Church: Episcopal Church
- Diocese: Quincy
- Elected: June 5, 1936
- In office: 1936–1958
- Predecessor: M. Edward Fawcett
- Successor: Francis Lickfield

Orders
- Ordination: June 11, 1911 by David H. Greer
- Consecration: September 29, 1936 by James De Wolf Perry

Personal details
- Born: February 8, 1886 Piermont, New York, United States
- Died: February 26, 1959 (aged 73) Peoria, Illinois, United States
- Buried: Christ Church of Lower Kickapoo
- Denomination: Anglican
- Parents: William Essex & Elizabeth Looser
- Spouse: Charlotte Josephine Nason
- Children: 2
- Education: Columbia University

William Leopold Essex (February 8, 1886 – February 26, 1959) was fourth bishop of the Episcopal Diocese of Quincy.

== Early life and education ==
Essex was born in Piermont, New York to William Essex and Elizabeth Looser Essex. He was educated at the high school of Nyack, New York, before studying at Columbia University from where he earned a Bachelor of Arts in 1906. Following education at Columbia University, he studied at the General Theological Seminary, where he graduated with a Bachelor of Divinity in 1911. He was awarded a number of honorary doctoral degrees: a Doctor of Sacred Theology from Columbia University in 1937 and from the General Theological Seminary in 1938, respectively, and a Doctor of Divinity from Nashotah House in 1936.

== Ordained ministry ==
Essex was made deacon in May 1910 by Bishop Sidney Catlin Partridge and ordained priest on June 11, 1911, by Bishop David H. Greer of New York. Essex married Charlotte Josephine Nason on June 11, 1914. He was curate at Trinity Church, Newport, Rhode Island from 1910 till 1913, and then rector of St Peter's Church in St. Louis, Missouri from 1913 till 1917. In 1918 he became rector of Trinity Church in Rock Island, Illinois, while in 1925 became rector of St Paul's Church in Peoria, Illinois, where he remained till 1936.

== Episcopate ==
On June 5, 1936, Essex was elected as the fourth Bishop of Quincy; he was consecrated bishop on September 29, 1936 with Presiding Bishop James De Wolf Perry as chief consecrator. Essex served as diocesan bishop until 1958. He died on February 26, 1959, at the St Francis Hospital in Peoria, Illinois.
