= Peter Wilkinson (priest) =

Canadian Roman Catholic priest (1940–2026)

The Reverend Monsignor Peter Wilkinson
- Priest
- Church: Roman Catholic Church
- See: Personal Ordinariate of the Chair of Saint Peter
- In office: 2012–2014
- Previous post: Metropolitan bishop of the Anglican Catholic Church of Canada (2005–2011)

Orders
- Ordination: 1965 (Anglican); 8 December 2012 (Catholic)
- Consecration: 21 October 1999 (Anglican)

Personal details
- Born: Peter Donald Wilkinson; 13 April 1940 Victoria, British Columbia, Canada
- Died: 6 June 2026 (aged 86)
- Denomination: Catholicism (formerly Anglican)
- Education: College of the Resurrection

Peter Donald Wilkinson (13 April 1940 – 6 June 2026) was a Canadian Roman Catholic priest. He was a bishop in the Anglican Catholic Church of Canada, a Continuing Anglican church within the Traditional Anglican Communion. Wilkinson was received into the Roman Catholic Church in 2012 and was ordained a Catholic priest and served within the Personal Ordinariate of the Chair of Saint Peter.

== Early life and education ==
Born in Victoria, British Columbia, Wilkinson grew up in his hometown located on the southern tip of Vancouver Island. As a teenager, he was impressed by Anglo-Catholic liturgy and provided services to Christ Church Cathedral (Victoria, British Columbia), then entered the university, and became more interested in religious life and decided to seek ordination to the priesthood. After graduating, Wilkinson received a permit from the Anglican bishop of British Columbia to enter an Anglo-Catholic seminary in England run by the Community of the Resurrection religious order. In 1965, he was ordained and became a member of the order.

=== Departure from the Anglican Communion ===
As a priest in England, in 1968 Wilkinson had what he called a zeitgeist. Unhappy with the evolution of the liturgy and English society, he left England and returned to Canada, convinced that the Anglican Diocese of British Columbia would welcome him. However, he was rejected because of his Catholic views. In addition, he realized that the changes that took place in England were also happening in Canada: women ordained as priests, the church recognized divorced and remarried people and "gender neutral" language was becoming common in liturgies.

In 1977, Wilkinson left the Anglican Communion to join the Traditional Anglican Communion (TAC), a church influenced by the Oxford Movement, including the writings of John Henry Newman, and the thinking of Cardinal Joseph Ratzinger. On 21 October 1999, Wilkinson was consecrated as a bishop and wrote to Cardinal Ratzinger to explain that "the basis of his teaching is the catechism of the Catholic Church" and "his desire to return to full communion with the Holy See". The future Pope Benedict XVI replied and sent him an autographed copy of his book The Spirit of the Liturgy. On 10 January 2005, upon the retirement of then Bishop Robert W. S. Mercer, CR, Wilkinson became metropolitan bishop of the Anglican Catholic Church of Canada.

=== Reception into the Roman Catholic Church ===
In 2007, he participated in the synod of the Traditional Anglican Communion which unanimously voted for full communion with Rome. In 2009, Pope Benedict XVI published the apostolic constitution Anglicanorum coetibus. In November 2011, Wilkinson became bishop of the Our Lady of Walsingham Ordinariate, composed of clergy and parishes who were preparing to enter the Roman Catholic Church. In January 2012 the Pope created the Personal Ordinariate of the Chair of Saint Peter. Thus, after 50 years of priesthood and almost 13 years as bishop in the Anglican tradition, Wilkinson became a Roman Catholic as a layman. On April 15, he made his profession of faith and received communion for the first time as a Catholic, along with Carl Reid, at a ceremony officiated by Monsignor Richard Gagnon at St Andrew's Cathedral in Victoria. On 8 December, the feast of the Immaculate Conception, he was ordained as a priest of the Personal Ordinariate of the Chair of Saint Peter, administered by Monsignor Jeffrey Steenson. A month later, the Pope appointed Wilkinson a Prelate of Honour, thus granting him the title of "monsignor". He served in the Church of Saint Columba of Iona in Victoria — a small wooden parish church for a century and leased to Anglicans — until 2014, when he officially retired himself.

== Death ==
Wilkinson died on 6 June 2026, at the age of 86.
