= William Adams (educator) =

American theologian

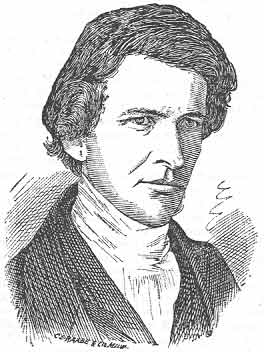
- Born: July 3, 1813; Monaghan
- Died: January 2, 1897 (aged 83); Nashotah
- Alma mater: Trinity College Dublin; General Theological Seminary
- Occupation: Educator, priest (1843–)
- Employer: Nashotah House
- Position held: rector (1878–1886)

William Adams (July 3, 1813 – January 2, 1897) was an American theologian and educator, co-founder of Nashotah House.

William Adams was born on July 3, 1813 in Monaghan, Ireland. He graduated from Trinity College with a Bachelor of Arts in 1838. He studied law and medicine for a year each, and spent some time with his uncle at Ballyhaise working as an accountant. In 1839, he immigrated to New York City, where he enrolled at the General Theological Seminary of the Protestant Episcopal church, graduating in 1841. He was ordained as a deacon in July 1841, and as a priest on October 9, 1843.

He was one of the founders of Nashotah Mission, later known as Nashotah Theological Seminary, in Wisconsin, where he arrived in September 1841. During the following winter, he contributed an article on the church's duties to her emigrants to an English publication, which garnered significant attention. From 1878 to 1886, he served as rector at Delafield and Pine Lake. Additionally, from the inception of Nashotah Seminary, he held the position of professor of systematic divinity until his death.

Dr. Adams published Mercy to Babes (New York, 1847), Christian Science (Philadelphia, 1850), and A New Treatise on Baptismal Regeneration (New York, 1871), and contributed largely to periodical literature, writing principally on theological topics.

William Adams died on January 2, 1897 in Nashotah.
