= William Essex (disambiguation) =

Sir William Essex (1477–1548) was an English politician.

William Essex may also refer to:

- William Essex (fl. 1406), MP for Wallingford
- Sir William Essex, 1st Baronet (c. 1575-c. 1645), English politician
- William Essex (painter) (1784–1869), miniaturist
- William Leopold Essex (1886–1936), bishop of the Episcopal Diocese of Quincy
