= Hiram Kano =

Reverend Hiram Hisanori Kano

Orders
- Ordination: 1936

Personal details
- Born: January 30, 1889 Tokyo, Japan
- Died: October 24, 1988 (age 99) Fort Collins, Colorado
- Denomination: Episcopal Church
- Residence: Nebraska
- Spouse: Ai Nagai
- Children: 2
- Occupation: English interpreter, farmer
- Education: Imperial University in Tokyo; University of Nebraska; Nashotah House

Hiram Hisanori Kano (Japanese: 加納久憲) was a Japanese American priest in the Episcopal Church who was interned by the United States government during World War II.

== Biography ==
Kano's father was Viscount Kano (Hisayoshi Kano), governor of Kagoshima Prefecture and a member of the National Diet. As a second son, he chose a career different from his father, studying agriculture at the Imperial University in Tokyo, graduating in 1916.

His family was acquainted with William Jennings Bryan because they had hosted Bryan's official visit to Japan. Bryan convinced Kano to pursue more education in the United States and wrote him a letter of introduction so that he could study at the University of Nebraska. There, he graduated with a master's degree in agricultural economics in 1918.

Kano married a woman named Ai Nagai in 1919; the couple bought a farm near Litchfield, Nebraska and had two children. Like many other Japanese immigrants in the area, Kano farmed sugar beets. Kano became active in the Japanese Americanization Society and served as an interpreter and English teacher for immigrants. He allied himself with the local bishop of the Episcopal Church to defeat a bill in the Nebraska Legislature that would have outlawed Japanese residents owning property and serving as legal guardians of their own children. He subsequently became more active in the church, becoming a deacon in 1928 and a priest in 1936.

Within hours of the bombing of Pearl Harbor, Kano was arrested in North Platte. While apprehending him the police asked Kano if he knew judo, to which he answered yes. He was then interrogated by the Federal Bureau of Investigation. Government officials considered him a threat to national security because of his family ties to the Japanese government and his position as a leader in the Japanese immigrant community. They sent him to an internment camp, separating him from his family. In the camp, he taught English classes to fellow internees, nicknaming it "Internment University." He also served as a minister to internees, prisoners of war, and American soldiers imprisoned because they were facing court martial.

The US government released him from internment in 1944. He moved with his family to Nashotah, Wisconsin and entered seminary, graduating with another master's degree in 1946. He then returned to Nebraska and worked as an Episcopal missionary among Nebraska's Japanese residents. Kano and his wife became United States citizens in 1953. He retired in 1957 and died in Fort Collins, Colorado in 1988, at the age of 99.

== Legacy ==
The Episcopal church in 2015 included commemorations for Kano in their calendar of saints for a triennium — a period of three years. October 24 was designated for commemoration of Kano.

The Nebraska legislature recognized him as "a quiet and persevering warrior in the battle against the evil of racism and a champion of his people" in a 2012 resolution.

Kano's book A History of the Japanese in Nebraska is a valued reference on the history of the issei (the first generation) of Japanese immigrants to the state.
