= Francis Lickfield =

5th Episcopal Bishop of Quincy

The Right Reverend Francis William Lickfield S.T.D., D.D.
- Bishop of Quincy
- Church: Episcopal Church
- Diocese: Quincy
- Elected: May 1958
- In office: 1958–1973
- Predecessor: William Leopold Essex
- Successor: Donald J. Parsons

Orders
- Ordination: December 1933 by Francis M. Taitt
- Consecration: September 20, 1958 by Frank Burrill

Personal details
- Born: February 9, 1908 Philadelphia, Pennsylvania, United States
- Died: December 14, 1998 (aged 90) Yarmouth Port, Massachusetts, United States
- Denomination: Anglican
- Parents: Francis William Lickfield & Mary Agnes Desmond
- Spouse: Josephine Mondello
- Children: 2

Francis William Lickfield (February 9, 1908 – December 14, 1998) was the fifth bishop of the Episcopal Diocese of Quincy.

== Early life and education ==
Lickfield was born on February 9, 1908, in Philadelphia, to Francis William Lickfield and Mary Agnes Desmond. He studied at Temple University and then at the Philadelphia Divinity School, from which he earned a Bachelor of Theology in 1933. He was awarded a Doctor of Divinity from the Philadelphia Divinity School in 1959 and a Doctor of Sacred Theology from Nashotah House in 1959.

== Ordained ministry ==
Lickfield was made deacon in June 1933 and ordained priest in December 1933 by Bishop Francis M. Taitt of Pennsylvania. He married Josephine Mondello on March 7, 1934, and together had two children. Between 1933 and 1934, he served as a missionary and chaplain of the House of Refuge in New York City. In 1934, he became vicar of St John's Church in Westfield, Pennsylvania, St Andrew's Church in Tioga, Pennsylvania and the Church of the Holy Spirit in Knoxville, Pennsylvania. In 1936, he became a member of the diocesan department for Christian Education, while in 1938 he became a priest of the Bush Brotherhood. Between 1936 and 1943, he also served as rector of St Paul's Church in Philipsburg, Pennsylvania. Between 1943 and 1945, he returned to New York to serve as assistant priest at the Chapel of the Intercession. In 1945 he became rector of St Matthias' Church in Waukesha, Wisconsin, while in 1948 he moved to Chicago to become rector of the Church of the Redeemer, a post he held till 1948.

== Bishop ==
In May 1958, Lickfield was elected Bishop of Quincy during a diocesan convention. He was consecrated on September 20, 1958, in St John's Cathedral, Quincy, Illinois. In 1965, he objected to Bishop Pike's initiative in the Diocese of California to have women deacons distribute Communion. He retired on June 30, 1973.
