= Frederick W. Taylor (bishop) =

American bishop (1853–1903)

The Right Reverend Frederick William Taylor D.D.
- Bishop of Quincy
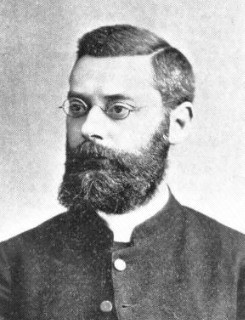
- Church: Episcopal Church
- Diocese: Quincy
- Elected: December 9, 1900
- In office: 1901–1903
- Predecessor: Alexander Burgess
- Successor: M. Edward Fawcett
- Previous post: Coadjutor Bishop of Quincy (1900-1901)

Orders
- Ordination: September 30, 1877 by Horatio Potter
- Consecration: August 6, 1901 by George Franklin Seymour

Personal details
- Born: January 11, 1853 Toledo, Ohio, United States
- Died: April 28, 1903 (aged 50) Kenosha, Wisconsin, United States
- Denomination: Anglican
- Parents: Alfred Taylor & Helen Augusta Mills Leonard
- Spouse: Cora L. Kingsley
- Education: Western Reserve Academy

Frederick William Taylor (January 11, 1853 – April 28, 1903) was the second bishop of the Episcopal Diocese of Quincy in the Episcopal Church.

== Early life and education ==
Taylor was born in Toledo, Ohio on January 11, 1853, the son of Alfred Taylor and Helen Augusta Mills Leonard. He studied at the Western Reserve Academy and graduated with a Bachelor of Arts in 1873 and a Master of Arts in 1875. He also earned a Bachelor of Divinity from the General Theological Seminary in 1876. He was awarded an honorary Doctor of Divinity from Nashotah House in 1890. Taylor married Cora L. Kingsley on August 11, 1874.

== Ordained ministry ==
Taylor was ordained deacon on July 5, 1876, by Bishop Gregory T. Bedell of Ohio, and served at Grace Church in Cleveland until October 1876, when he left for Europe. Upon his return to the United States seven months later, he took charge of the missions of Willoughby, Geneva, and Unionville, all near Cleveland. In September 1877, he was involved in mission work at Highland and Clintondale, in Ulster County, New York. He was ordained priest in the Church of the Transfiguration in New York City on September 30, 1877, by Bishop Horatio Potter of New York. He served as rector of Holy Trinity Church in Danville, Illinois from 1878 till 1886. In 1886 he became rector of St Paul's Pro-Cathedral in Springfield, Illinois and Archdeacon of Springfield. He was also a member of the general convention and in 1895, started instructing church policy and canon law at the Western Theological Seminary. He served as a chaplain of the State Senate of Illinois.

== Bishop ==
On December 9, 1900, Taylor was elected Coadjutor Bishop of Quincy and was consecrated on August 6, 1901, by Bishop George Franklin Seymour of Springfield. He succeeded as diocesan bishop in October 1901. He died in office in Kenosha, Wisconsin on April 28, 1903.
