= Louis Falk =

American bishop (1935–2025)

The Right Reverend Louis Falk
- President of the House of Bishops
- Church: Anglican Church in America
- In office: 1991-2005

Orders
- Consecration: February 14, 1981

Personal details
- Born: December 30, 1935 Milwaukee
- Died: January 23, 2025 (aged 89)

Louis Wahl Falk III (December 30, 1935 – January 23, 2025) was a Continuing Anglican bishop who served as the president of the House of Bishops of the Anglican Church in America. Until 2002 he was the primate of the Traditional Anglican Communion, an international body of Continuing Anglican churches.

Falk was born in Milwaukee, Wisconsin. In 1953 he graduated from the University School of Milwaukee. On September 3, 1955, he married Carol Alice Froemming. In 1958, Falk graduated from Lawrence College (now Lawrence University) with a major in philosophy and a Bachelor of Arts degree awarded summa cum laude. He was a member of Phi Beta Kappa.

In 1962, Falk graduated with a Master of Divinity degree awarded cum laude from Nashotah House, a seminary of the Episcopal Church. On January 23, 1962, he was ordained a deacon, and on August 6, 1962, he was ordained a priest in the Episcopal Church. He went on to become a businessman and from 1976 to 1981 he was president of the General Growth Management Company in Des Moines, Iowa.

In the late 1970s, Falk joined the Anglican Catholic Church. He became rector of Saint Aidan's Parish in Des Moines. In 1981 he was elected first bishop of the Diocese of the Missouri Valley. On February 14, 1981, in Des Moines, he was consecrated a bishop by James Orin Mote (Diocese of the Holy Trinity), Carmino de Cantanzaro (Anglican Catholic Church of Canada), William F. Burns (Diocese of the Resurrection), William O. Lewis (Diocese of the Midwest), and William Dejarnette Rutherford (Diocese of the Mid-Atlantic).

In 1983, Falk was elected archbishop and primate of the Anglican Catholic Church. In the late 1980s, under Falk's leadership, the Anglican Catholic Church entered into discussions with the American Episcopal Church to effect a union between the two bodies. A portion of the Anglican Catholic Church and the American Episcopal Church united in October 1991 to form the Anglican Church in America of which Falk became the first primate.

Falk helped convene and create the Traditional Anglican Communion, of which he also became the first primate.

In 2002 Falk resigned as primate of the Traditional Anglican Communion and was succeeded by Archbishop John Hepworth. In 2005, Falk retired as primate of the Anglican Church in America and as bishop ordinary of the Diocese of the Missouri Valley. The church restructured itself and decided not to have a primate, but instead a president of the House of Bishops. Falk was elected the first president of the House of Bishops. He was succeeded as bishop of the Diocese of the Missouri Valley by Bishop Stephen D. Strawn.

Religious titles
| Preceded by new title | Primate of the Traditional Anglican Communion; 1991–2003 | Succeeded by John Hepworth |
