= Alexander Burgess =

Bishop of the Episcopal Diocese of Quincy

The Right Reverend Alexander Burgess D.D., LL.D.
- Bishop of Quincy
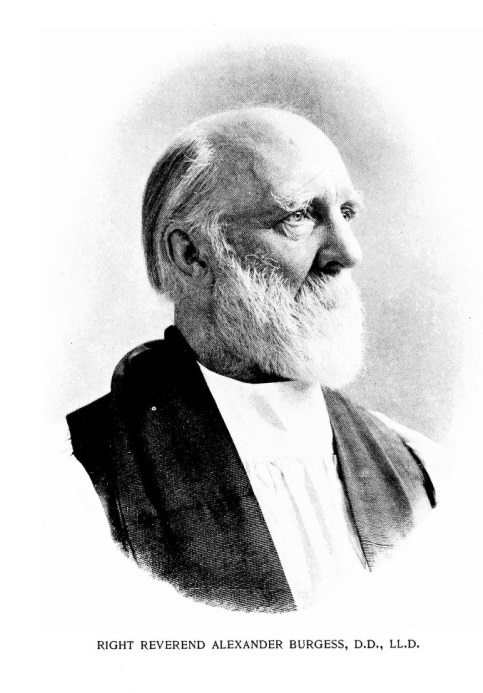
- Church: Episcopal Church
- Diocese: Quincy
- Elected: February 26, 1878
- In office: 1878–1901
- Successor: Frederick W. Taylor

Orders
- Ordination: November 1, 1843 by John P. K. Henshaw
- Consecration: May 15, 1878 by Benjamin B. Smith

Personal details
- Born: October 31, 1819 Providence, Rhode Island, United States
- Died: October 8, 1901 (aged 81) St. Albans, Vermont
- Buried: Greenwood Cemetery, St. Albans
- Denomination: Anglican
- Parents: Thomas Burgess and Mary Mackie
- Spouse: Mary Williams Selden (m. 1845; d. 1856); Maria Annette Howard (m. 1858; d. 1899)
- Children: 3
- Education: Brown University

Alexander Burgess (October 31, 1819 – October 8, 1901) was the first bishop of the Episcopal Diocese of Quincy.

== Early life and education ==
Burgess was born on October 31, 1819, in Providence, Rhode Island, the son of Judge Thomas Burgess (1778-1856) and Mary Mackie (1778-1835). His brother George Burgess was to become the future Bishop of Maine, while his nephew Frederick Burgess, was to become the future Bishop of Long Island. He graduated from Brown University in 1838 and the General Theological Seminary in 1841.

== Ordained ministry ==
Burgess was ordained to the diaconate on November 3, 1842, by Presiding Bishop Alexander Viets Griswold, and to the priesthood on November 1, 1843, by Bishop John Prentiss Kewley Henshaw of Rhode Island. In 1842, Burgess was assigned to St Stephen's Church in East Haddam, Connecticut, while in 1843 he became rector of St Mark's Church in Augusta, Maine. Between 1854 and 1866 he served as rector St Luke's Church in Portland, Maine. In 1866, he went to become rector of St John's Church in Brooklyn, while in 1869 he assumed the rectorship of Christ Church in Springfield, Massachusetts, where he remained till 1878. He represented the dioceses of Maine, Long Island and Massachusetts as a deputy from 1844 to 1877, and was elected President of the House of Deputies in 1877.

== Bishop ==
During a special convention held February 26, 1878, Burgess was elected as the first Bishop of Quincy on the forty fourth ballot. He was consecrated in Christ Church on May 15, 1878, with Presiding Bishop Benjamin B. Smith as chief consecrator. In 1892, he preached at the General Convention in Baltimore.
