= Donald J. Parsons =

American Episcopal bishop

The Right Reverend Donald James Parsons
- Bishop of Quincy
- Church: Episcopal Church
- Diocese: Quincy
- Elected: 1973
- In office: 1973–1988
- Predecessor: Francis Lickfield
- Successor: Edward Harding MacBurney

Orders
- Ordination: October 6, 1946 by Arthur R. McKinstry
- Consecration: September 8, 1973 by John E. Hines

Personal details
- Born: March 28, 1922 Philadelphia, Pennsylvania, United States
- Died: January 4, 2016 (aged 93) Peoria, Illinois, United States
- Buried: Nashotah House Cemetery
- Denomination: Anglican
- Parents: Earl Parsons, Helen Drabble
- Spouse: Mary Russell
- Children: 3
- Education: Temple University

Donald James Parsons (March 28, 1922 – January 4, 2016) was an American Episcopal bishop. He was bishop of the Episcopal Diocese of Quincy from 1973 to 1988.

== Early life and education ==
Parsons was born in Philadelphia on March 28, 1922, the son of Earl Parsons (1891-1957) and Helen Drabble (1896-1958). He was educated at Temple University where he earned a Bachelor of Arts in 1943, and at the Philadelphia Divinity School, where he graduated with a Bachelor of Theology in 1946. He was awarded a Doctor of Theology in 1952.

== Ordained ministry ==
Parsons was made deacon in February 1946 by Bishop William Remington, suffragan of Pennsylvania, and served as assistant at Holy Trinity Church in Philadelphia. He was ordained priest on October 6, 1946, by Bishop Arthur R. McKinstry of Delaware. He married Mary Russell on September 17, 1955, and together they had three children. After ordination, he became curate at Immanuel Church in Wilmington, Delaware, and in 1949 he became rector of St. Peter's Church in Smyrna, Delaware. In 1950, he started teaching theology at Nashotah House, a professorship he held until 1973. He also served as Dean of Nashotah House from 1963 till 1973.

== Bishop ==
In 1973, Parsons was elected Bishop of Quincy and was consecrated as a bishop on September 8, 1973, with Presiding Bishop John E. Hines as chief consecrator. He retired in 1988. Later he served as an assisting bishop in the Diocese of Springfield.

== Bibliography ==
- The Holy Eucharist, Rite Two: A Devotional Commentary (1976)
- A Lifetime Road to God (1977)
- In Time - With Jesus
