= Royden Yerkes =

American Episcopal priest and theologian (1881–1964)

Royden Keith Yerkes (June 22, 1881 – June 21, 1964) was an Episcopal priest and theologian.

Yerkes was born in Philadelphia. Yerkes was ordained in 1906. He received his B.A. (1903) M.A. (1911) and Ph.D. (1918) from the University of Pennsylvania. He served as head of the graduate department of religious history at Philadelphia Divinity School from 1918 to 1935, and was a professor of theology at the University of the South. He was also an instructor at Nashotah House Theological Seminary. He was examining chaplain of the Episcopal Diocese of Pennsylvania from 1911 to 1931. Yerkes died in Evanston, Illinois, where he had been director of religious education for the Episcopal Diocese of Chicago from 1947 until his 1952 retirement.

He wrote Sacrifice in Greek and Roman Religions and Early Judaism, a monograph on the origins of religious sacrifice translated into French in 1955.

== Works ==
- What is a Deaconess? (no date) from Project Canterbury
- The History of St. Luke's Church, Germantown from the Time of the Permanent Establishment of Church Services in Germantown in 1811 to the Celebration of the Centennial (1912)
- "Some Notes on the Use of אל in Genesis," Journal of Biblical Literature], Volume 31 (1912)
- The Holy Communion: A Study in the Christ-life (1916)
- The Lucianic version of the Old Testament as illustrated from Jeremiah 1–3 (dissertation, University of Pennsylvania, 1918)
- "The Unclean Animals of Leviticus 11 and Deuteronomy 14," Jewish Quarterly Review, Vol. XIV, No. 1. (July 1923)
- Three Addresses Delivered before the Clergy Conference of the Diocese of New York at Lake Mahopac on October 19th and 20th, 1932
- The Oxford Movement and the Catholic Revival (Church Club of Philadelphia, 1933, 16pp)
- "A Priest's Reply to a Scientist: The Religion of to-morrow" in The Atlantic (March 1933)
- The Christian Faith in the Present-day World (1941)
- Sacrifice in Greek and Roman Religions and Early Judaism (1952)
- Le sacrifice dans la religion grecque et romaine et dans le judaisme primitif (1955)
- Revised Form for the Prayer of Consecration in the American Prayer Book (1955)
- Why Closed Communion (Holy Cross Publications, 1956, 18pp)
- Yerkes, Royden Keith; Chitty, Arthur Ben (December 1960). "The Beginnings of the Graduate School of Theology of the University of the South". Historical Magazine of the Protestant Episcopal Church. 29 (4): 315–324. JSTOR 42974535.
