= Keith Ackerman =

American Anglican bishop (born 1946)

The Right Reverend Keith Ackerman SSC D.D.
- Bishop of Quincy
- See: Quincy
- Retired: 2008
- Predecessor: Edward H. MacBurney
- Successor: Juan Alberto Morales

Orders
- Ordination: Deacon: April 20, 1974; Priest: December 21, 1974
- Consecration: June 29, 1994

Personal details
- Born: Keith Lynn Ackerman; August 3, 1946 (age 79) McKeesport, Pennsylvania, U.S.
- Denomination: Anglican Church in North America (formerly The Episcopal Church)
- Parents: Raymond L. Ackerman, Alberta M. Pritchard Ackerman
- Spouse: Joann
- Children: 3

Keith Lynn Ackerman SSC (born August 3, 1946) is an American Anglican bishop. Consecrated as a bishop for the Diocese of Quincy in the Episcopal Church, he is currently bishop vicar of the Anglican Diocese of Quincy of the Anglican Church in North America and assisting bishop of the Diocese of Fort Worth.

Ackerman lives in Keller, Texas. He has worked part-time as a therapist, assists the bishop of the Episcopal Diocese of Fort Worth, and served as Bishop in Residence at St. Timothy's Church in Fort Worth until September, 2021. Before becoming a bishop, Ackerman was a curate at the Church of the Transfiguration in Freeport, Long Island, New York (1974–76), then as rector of St. Mary's Church in Charleroi, Pennsylvania (1976–1989), and then as rector of St. Mark's Church in Arlington, Texas (1989 - 1994). He served as vicar of St. Timothy Church in Fort Worth from 2011 until 2021.

== Early life and education ==
Ackerman was born in McKeesport, Pennsylvania, on August 3, 1946, to Raymond Levan Ackerman (1909 - 1985), a first generation Swede, and Alberta Melba Pritchard (1912 - 2001), a first generation immigrant of Welsh and English descent. His sisters, Adrienne Ann and Rae Levan, died prior to his birth. He has a brother, Jay, who was born in 1953. Ackerman attended Centennial Elementary School, George Washington School, and graduated from McKeesport Area High School in 1964. He was noted as a baseball pitcher there, and in 2005 he was inducted into the McKesport High School Hall of Fame. He attended Pennsylvania State University and the University of Pittsburgh while working full-time for the United States Steel Corporation - Duquesne Works. He graduated with a Bachelor of Science degree from Marymount College in Salina, Kansas, in 1971 while working at the St. Francis Boys Home in nearby Ellsworth. He also completed graduate studies in psychology under the supervision of Ronald C. Force of Salina, Kansas. He later received his Master of Divinity degree from Nashotah House seminary in 1974 and a Doctor of Divinity from the same institution in 1994. His additional studies are in the areas of psychology, languages, liturgy and ecclesiastical architecture. On May 30, 2020, he was awarded a Doctor of Divinity degree by Reformed Episcopal Seminary in Blue Bell, Pennsylvania. He has served as an adjunct professor and visiting lecturer at the Reformed Episcopal Seminary since 2011 and as an adjunct to Cranmer House Seminary in Dallas, Texas. He served from 1992 until 2020 as a member of the board of trustees (directors) of Nashotah House, serving for 10 years as vice-chairman of the board. In 2020 he was named an honorary trustee.

== Ordained ministry ==
Ackerman was ordained as a deacon in 1974 at the Chapel of St. Mary the Virgin at Nashotah House in Wisconsin and to the priesthood the same year in Freeport, Long Island, by Bishop William Davidson of the Diocese of Western Kansas. He served as a curate at the Church of the Transfiguration in Freeport, New York, and worked at the parochial school as an instructor, coach and counselor from 1974 to 1976. While in Long Island he did additional studies in chemical addiction and worked as a therapist. In 1976 he was called to be rector of St. Mary's Church, Charleroi, Pennsylvania, in the Episcopal Diocese of Pittsburgh.

As rector in Charleroi, Ackerman served as president of the Charleroi Clergy Association and founded St. Elizabeth Chapel in nearby Bentleyville. In 1983 he was awarded the "Excellence in Pastoral Care" award by the Bishop of Pittsburgh. He was also a recipient in 1988 of the Bishop of Pittsburgh's award for extraordinary service to the church. Much of his ministry work was directed at assisting the unemployed and otherwise advancing the interests of local workers. He established five outreach ministries and a Christian counseling service for the unemployed and also received the Ecumenical Award from Christian Associates of Southwest Pennsylvania in 1984 for his mediation in a labor dispute between union members and management at a local steel-related business. He was active in diocesan life, serving as president of the standing committee and as deputy to General Convention. He was also an active educator, teaching in several institutions including Chichester Theological College in Chichester, England, and Duquesne University in Pittsburgh. He was also noted for media involvement and worked as a substitute host on several radio and television shows. He was a guest lecturer at the Trinity School for Ministry in Ambridge. In 1987 he was named "Father of the Year" by the Mon Valley Independent newspaper.

In 1989, Ackerman was called to be rector of St. Mark's Church in Arlington, Texas, in the Episcopal Diocese of Fort Worth. While there, he served as president of the local ministerial association and was presented the "Minister of the Year" award. He also served as a member of several diocesan committees, including president of the standing committee.

== Election and consecration as bishop ==
Ackerman was elected as the eighth Bishop of Quincy on January 8, 1994. He was consecrated as a bishop on June 29, 1994, at St. Paul's Cathedral in the see city of Peoria, Illinois. He retired as Bishop of Quincy on November 1, 2008. During his fifteen-year episcopacy a significant emphasis was placed on the spiritual life of the clergy and lay leaders, including the Diocesan School for Ministry. While he was immediately thrust into an international, national, and regional ministry that included greater ecclesiastical chaos, he sought to establish order based on the principles of the Anglo-Catholic revival and the Oxford Movement. These principles included a passion for ministering to the theologically marginalised, worship as a fore-taste of Heaven, the conversion of the culture, and Christ's Sacramental presence in the home, in the neighborhood, and in the “market place.” He served as one of the first “Flying Bishops” in the Episcopal Church under the title created by the Episcopal Church, “Delegated Episcopal Oversight” serving eighteen parishes outside his geographical diocese from California to Rhode Island. Web l[url]=http://www.dioceseofquincy.org

In an attempt to revitalize the diocese in the year 2000 he instituted a “Jubilee Year” policy whereby all debts to the diocese owed by parishes and missions were forgiven, and a capital campaign was instituted to provide for a full-time youth missionary whose task was to evangelise youth and establish youth programs in all parts of the Diocese and beyond. In addition a center for Mission and Evangelism was established.

In 1995, Ackerman welcomed and incorporated into the life of the Diocese, St. Benedict's Abbey, an Ecumenical, orthodox Monastic Order, located in Bartonville, Il. In 1999 the “Bartonville Agreement” was written as a model of the reunion of various Anglican Jurisdictions. Several of the monks served on the Diocesan staff. Ackerman serves as Bishop Visitor of the Order.

== Post-retirement ==
Ackerman served as bishop in residence at St. Timothy Anglo-Catholic church in Fort Worth, Texas until September 2021, when he was given additional responsibilities by the Bishop of Fort Worth, Ryan S. Reed.

Ackerman was previously (until 2012) the president of Forward in Faith North America, a conservative Anglo-Catholic movement operating in a number of provinces of the Anglican Communion. Forward in Faith is known for its support of traditional theology and values.

Ackerman served as superior-general of the American branch of the Confraternity of the Blessed Sacrament from 1995 - 2010. As a founding member of the Anglican Church in North America, upon the enthronement of the Ninth Bishop of Quincy, Ackerman was given the title Bishop Vicar in the Diocese of Quincy. His successor in that ACNA position is Juan Alberto Morales.

Ackerman serves as episcopal patron and member of the board of trustees of the North American branch of the Society of King Charles the Martyr.

In 2020, he served as interim bishop of the Diocese of the Southwest during the vacancy between Mark Zimmerman and Steven Tighe.

== Writings ==
Ackerman has been a prolific writer, penning weekly columns for the Bentleyville Courier (1979–1985) and the Benworth Times (1983–1985), a monthly column for the Arlington Daily News (1990–1994), and numerous articles for The Harvest Plain (1994–present), the newspaper of the Diocese of Quincy. He has also written several books, including To God be the Glory, a book co-written with his wife, Joann, which was published in 2001. He has recently written a children's books on the Old Testament and the Apocrypha.

== Published books ==
- Why We Do What We Do: A Manual on the Eucharist, 1992, Dovetracts Publications
- The Work of the People: A Guide to the Eucharist, 1993, DoveTracts Publications
- To God be the Glory: Growing Towards a Healthy Church (with Joann Ackerman), 2001, Dovetracts Publications
- “Old Testament and Apocrypha Stories for Children,” 2022, The Parish Press

== See also ==
- Succession of Bishops of the Episcopal Church in the United States
- Anglican realignment

Anglican Communion titles
| Preceded by Edward Harding MacBurney | 8th Bishop of Quincy; 1994–2008 | Succeeded by Juan Alberto Morales (ACNA) |
