= John Hepworth =

Australian bishop (1944–2021)

The Right Reverend John Hepworth
- Church: Traditional Anglican Communion
- In office: 2003–2012
- Predecessor: Louis Falk
- Successor: Samuel Prakash

Orders
- Ordination: 1968
- Consecration: 1996

Personal details
- Born: 23 March 1944 Adelaide, South Australia
- Died: 1 December 2021 (aged 77) Adelaide, South Australia

John Anthony Hepworth (23 March 1944 – 1 December 2021) was an Australian bishop. He was the ordinary of the Anglican Catholic Church in Australia and the archbishop and primate of the Traditional Anglican Communion, an international body of continuing Anglican churches, from 2003 to 2012.

== Life ==
Hepworth began his seminary studies in 1960 at St Francis Xavier Seminary in Adelaide. In 1968 he was ordained to the priesthood in the Roman Catholic Church for the Archdiocese of Adelaide. In 1972 he moved to Britain. After returning to Australia in 1976 he was received into the Anglican Church of Australia as a priest. From 1976 to 1977 he had permission to officiate in the Anglican Diocese of Ballarat. From 1977 to 1978 he was the assistant priest in the Colac parish and, from 1978 to 1980, was the rector of the South Ballarat parish based in Sebastopol.

In 1992 Hepworth joined the Anglican Catholic Church in Australia (ACCA). On 29 June 1996 he was consecrated as a bishop, together with Robert John Friend, in the Pro-Cathedral of the Resurrection, Brisbane, by bishops Albert N. Haley (then diocesan bishop of the ACCA), Robert C. Crawley (Anglican Catholic Church of Canada), Wellborn Hudson (Anglican Church in America) and John Hazlewood (retired Bishop of Ballarat in the Anglican Church of Australia). Hepworth served as an assistant bishop until April 1998 when Bishop Friend (who had succeeded Haley as diocesan) resigned. From then until November 1999, Hepworth acted as bishop administrator. At the national synod of the ACCA, held from 25 to 29 November 1999, he was elected as the new diocesan bishop. In 2002 he was elected as primate of the Traditional Anglican Communion (TAC) in succession to Louis Falk.

Hepworth was involved in a process to create an Australian ordinariate for former Anglicans in the Roman Catholic Church. His personal history complicated the situation. He was not raised Anglican, but had left the Roman Catholic Church and then married twice and had three children. On 1 March 2012, the TAC bishops voted against union with the Roman Catholic Church. They also voted to accept Hepworth's already announced resignation as TAC primate with immediate effect. On 16 May 2012, the TAC College of Bishops suspended Hepworth, meaning that he ceased to be the TAC Bishop Ordinary of Australia.

Hepworth had a degree in political science and received a Bachelor of Arts degree from the University of Adelaide in 1982 with a thesis about Catholic Action entitled "The Movement Revisited: A South Australian Perspective". For five years he was a lecturer in politics at the Northern Territory University before becoming co-ordinator of international studies at the University of South Australia. In 1998 he was elected to the Australian Constitutional Convention as a member of Australians for Constitutional Monarchy. He formerly chaired the Australia-Vietnam Human Rights Committee in South Australia.

Hepworth was formerly heard regularly on Adelaide's 5AA radio station where he acted as a political commentator on the conservative Leon Byner Show.

Hepworth said that he was a victim of sexual abuse in the Roman Catholic Church in Australia during the 1960s and 1970s. He has alleged that he was raped on numerous occasions by three priests during his seminary studies and that the Catholic Church had failed to follow due process.

Hepworth was active in Liberal Party of Australia politics and was chair of the Boothby Liberal Federal Electorate Council from which role he resigned in 2021 after being diagnosed with motor neurone disease.

Hepworth died on 1 December 2021 in Adelaide. Two days before his death he was reconciled to the Roman Catholic Church and also recognised as a priest in good standing. He died of complications arising from motor neuron disease.

Religious titles
Preceded by Louis Falk	Primate of the Traditional Anglican Communion; 2003–2012	Succeeded by Samuel Prakash
