= Juan Alberto Morales =

Puerto Rican Anglican bishop (born 1961)

The Right Reverend Juan Alberto Morales OSB
- Bishop of Quincy
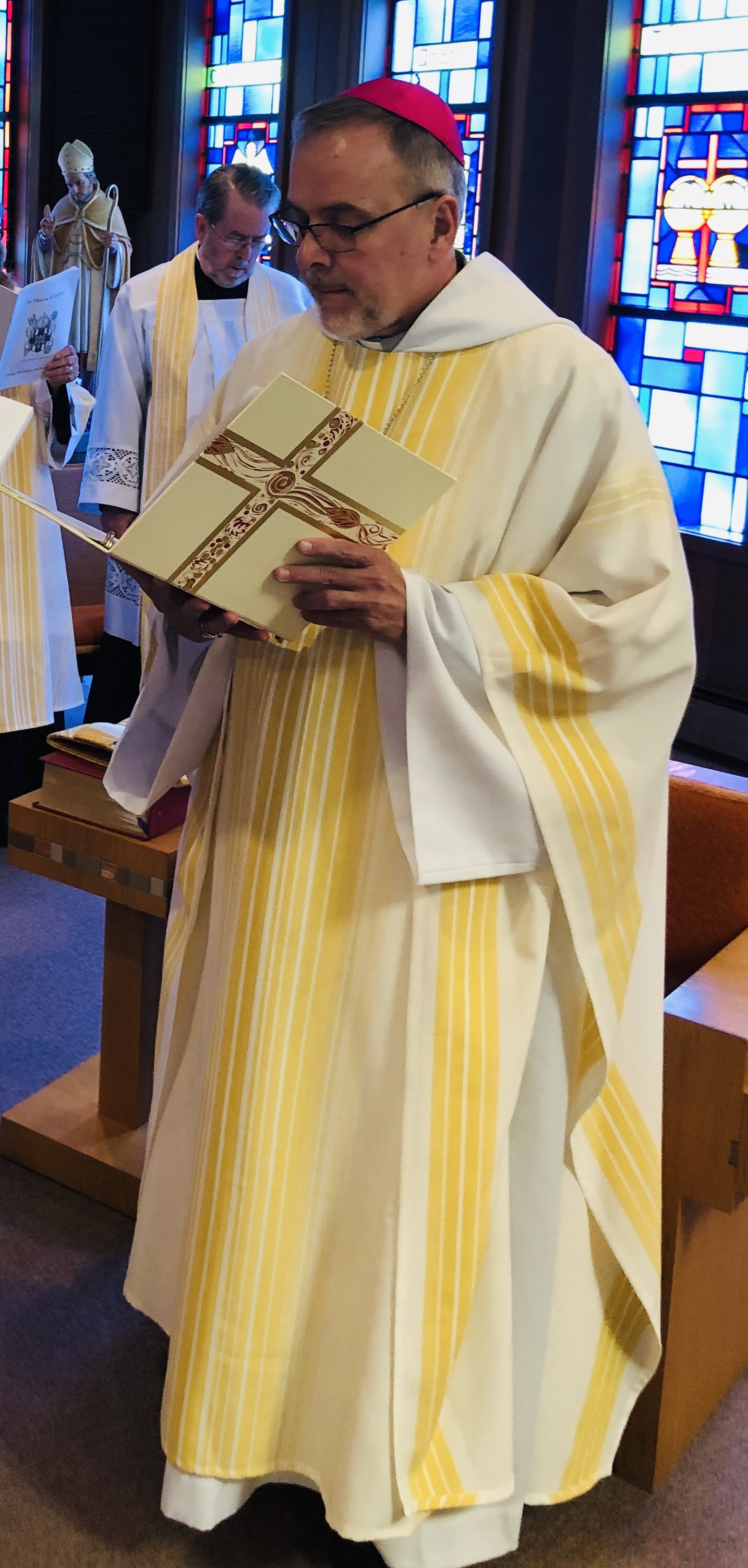
- Church: Anglican Church in North America
- Diocese: Diocese of Quincy
- In office: 2010–present
- Predecessor: Keith Ackerman
- Successor: Incumbent

Personal details
- Born: 1961 (age 64–65) Yabucoa, Puerto Rico

Juan Alberto Morales OSB (born 1961) is a Puerto Rican Anglican bishop. He is bishop of the Anglican Diocese of Quincy in the Anglican Church in North America. He was enthroned on September 18, 2010.

Morales was born in Yabucoa, Puerto Rico. He worked with the Brazilian Catholic Apostolic Church. In 1985 he founded St. Benedict's Abbey in Puerto Rico. He was ordained deacon and priest by David Álvarez, Bishop of the Episcopal Diocese of Puerto Rico. In 1996 St. Benedict's Abbey moved to Bartonville, Illinois in the Episcopal Diocese of Quincy. The abbey describes itself an "ecumenical community within the Catholic tradition".

In November 2008 the synod of the Diocese of Quincy voted to leave the Episcopal Church and join the Anglican Church in North America (ACNA). Morales was one of the clergy who left the Episcopal Church for ACNA. In September 2009, John Clark Buchanan, Provisional Bishop of the Diocese of Quincy (the group of those who stayed in the Episcopal Church), issued a letter inhibiting and deposing Morales and 33 other former clergy of the Episcopal diocese who had transferred to ACNA.

On June 12, 2010, Morales was elected bishop of the ACNA Diocese of Quincy in succession to Keith Ackerman. For an election, 22 votes were needed in the clergy order and 33 in the lay order. On the first ballot Morales received 18 clergy votes and 48 lay votes. On the second ballot he received 23 clergy votes and 51 lay votes. Morales' election was then submitted to the ACNA College of Bishops; confirmation required the consent of at least two-thirds of the active bishops.

Morales has been an episcopal visitor of the Company of Jesus and is currently an episcopal visitor of the Franciscan Missionaries of the Holy Cross.

== See also ==
- Anglican realignment

Anglican Communion titles
Preceded by Keith Ackerman	9th Bishop of Quincy; 2010-present	Succeeded by Incumbent
