= Traditional Anglican Church =

Continuing Anglican denomination

- Abbreviation: TAC
- Classification: Protestant
- Orientation: Anglo-Catholic (continuing Anglican)
- Polity: Episcopal
- Primate: Shane B. Janzen
- Associations: Anglican Province of America and Anglican Catholic Church
- Region: United States, Canada, South Africa, Australia, Zambia, India, Britain, Brazil, India
- Founder: Louis Falk
- Origin: 1991
- Official website: traditionalanglicanchurch.com

The Traditional Anglican Church (TAC), formerly the Traditional Anglican Communion, is an international church consisting of national provinces in the continuing Anglican movement, independent of the Anglican Communion and the Archbishop of Canterbury. The TAC upholds the theological doctrines of the Affirmation of St. Louis. Each of the respective jurisdictions utilizes a traditional Book of Common Prayer deemed to be free of theological deviation. Most parishioners of these churches would be described as being traditional Prayer Book Anglicans in their theology and liturgical practice. Some Anglo-Catholic parishes use the Anglican Missal in their liturgies. The TAC is governed by a college of bishops from across the church and headed by an elected primate.

The TAC was formed in 1991. Archbishop Louis Falk was its first primate. He was succeeded in 2002 by Archbishop John Hepworth of the Anglican Catholic Church in Australia. The current primate is Archbishop Shane Janzen of the Anglican Catholic Church of Canada.

TAC member churches were established outside the Anglican Communion over a number of different issues; the principal issue has been the ordination of women. Other issues include liturgical revisions, the acceptance of homosexual activity and the importance of apostolic tradition within the church.

== History ==
In 1990, the then Traditional Anglican Communion was formed by the agreement of the Victoria Concordat. In 1991, members of the American Episcopal Church, the Anglican Catholic Church, and some other continuing churches came together to form the Anglican Church in America as a part of the Traditional Anglican Communion. The goal was to create a united communion of Continuing Anglican churches, which originated in the Affirmation of St. Louis, which repudiated the revision of the Book of Common Prayer, in addition to other issues, such as the ordination of women. With the beginning of the 21st century, "the communion reported 14 member churches with a total of 300,000 members spread over six continents."

In October 2007 the bishops of TAC formally expressed the desire to enter into full unity with the See of Rome without losing core Anglican distinctives. The full petition accepted the ministry of the Bishop of Rome and the Catechism of the Catholic Church. The Vatican's Congregation for the Doctrine of the Faith stated, on 5 July 2008, that it was giving serious consideration to the prospect of corporate union with groups of Anglicans and on 29 October 2009 the Congregation for the Doctrine of the Faith announced Pope Benedict XVI's intention to create a new type of ecclesiastical structure, called a personal ordinariate, for unspecified groups of Anglicans entering into full communion with the See of Rome.

On 4 November 2009, Pope Benedict signed the apostolic constitution, Anglicanorum coetibus, which was released on 9 November 2009 and on 3 March 2010, in Orlando, Florida, the eight members of the house of bishops of the Anglican Church in America — the United States branch of the TAC — voted unanimously to formally ask the Holy See to be accepted as a personal ordinariate.

On 17 March 2010, leaders of the Canadian branch of the TAC (the Anglican Catholic Church of Canada) decided to do the same. The TAC member churches in the United Kingdom and Australia also petitioned for the formation of respective ordinariates.

On 1 March 2012, the TAC College of Bishops announced the acceptance, with immediate effect, of Archbishop Hepworth's resignation as primate and the appointment of Archbishop Samuel Prakash as acting primate. The college of bishops also made it known that the TAC would not be accepting the offer made to Anglicans by the Holy See.

On October 14, 2016, the college of bishops elected Archbishop Shane B. Janzen as the third primate of the Traditional Anglican Communion. The new constitution of the Traditional Anglican Church, which reconstitutes the worldwide Traditional Anglican Communion into the global Traditional Anglican Church, was adopted and ratified in March 2020.

On 16 February 2022, it was announced that the TAC has entered into an agreement of full sacramental communion (communio in sacris) with the Anglican Province of America.

In 2025, the American branch of the TAC (the Anglican Church in America) House of Bishops unanimously voted to reunite with the Anglican Catholic Church and disaffiliate with Traditional Anglican Church. Both actions are still pending. In response, the TAC published a statement calling the move "disappointing" and that it was not the path the TAC wished to take.

== Provinces ==
At present the Traditional Anglican Church consists of 10 Provinces and Dioceses:

Africa:

- The Anglican Church in Southern Africa
- Traditional Anglican Church of Zambia

Americas:

- Anglican Catholic Church of Canada
- Traditional Anglican Church - Latin American Province
- Diocese of São Paulo e Paraná (TAC in Brazil)
- Diocese of Natal (TAC in Brazil)

Asia:

- Anglican Church of India

Europe:

- The Traditional Anglican Church in Britain
- Church of Ireland - Traditional Rite

Oceania:

- Traditional Anglican Church in Australia
