= Nashotah Lakes =

Upper Nashotah Lake
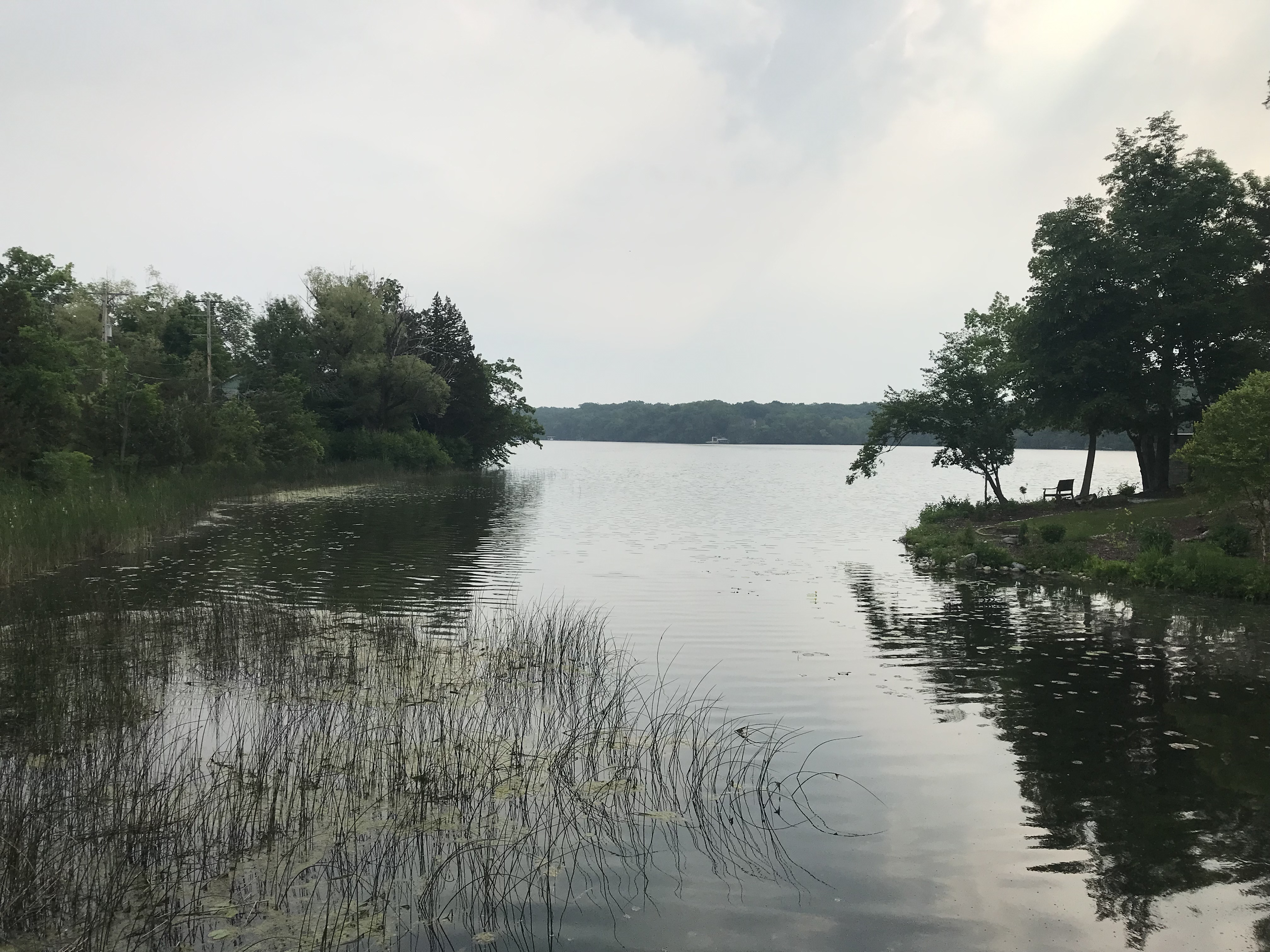

- Location within Wisconsin Location within the United States
- Location: Waukesha County, Wisconsin
- Group: Nashotah Lakes
- Coordinates: 43°05′08″N 88°25′44″W
- Type: lake

Lower Nashotah Lake
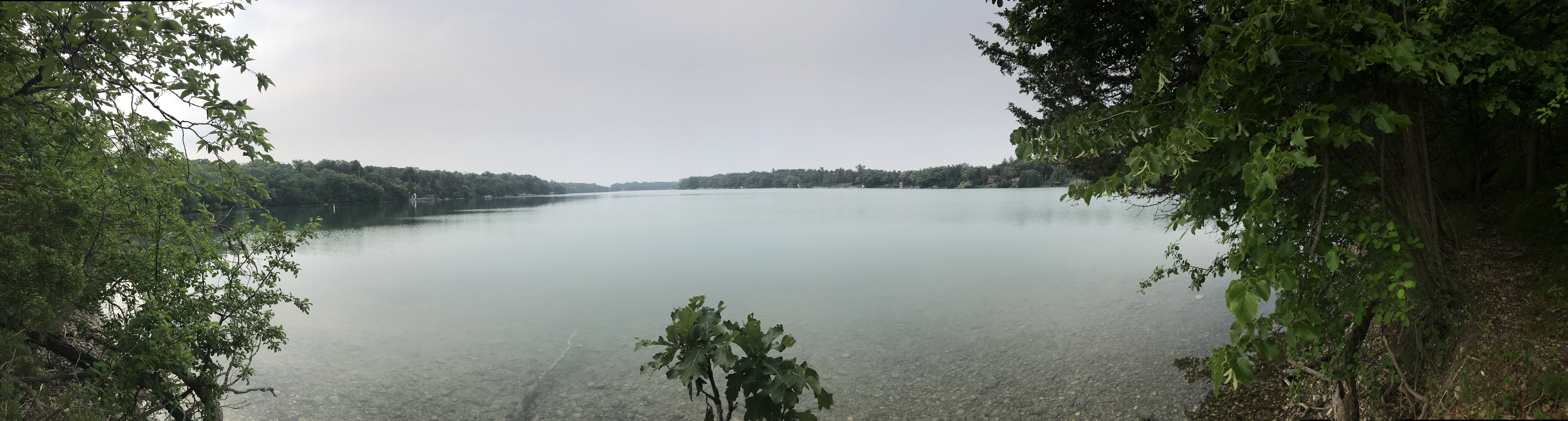

- Location within Wisconsin Location within the United States
- Location: Waukesha County, Wisconsin
- Group: Nashotah Lakes
- Coordinates: 43°04′38″N 88°26′04″W

Nashotah Lakes are a pair of lakes in Waukesha County, Wisconsin, in the United States.

The twin lakes consist of Upper Nashotah Lake (43°05′08″N 88°25′44″W) and Lower Nashotah Lake (43°04′38″N 88°26′04″W). Nashotah is a name derived from a Native American language meaning "twins".

== See also ==
- List of lakes in Wisconsin
