= Elizabeth Kemper Adams =

American professor (1872–1948)

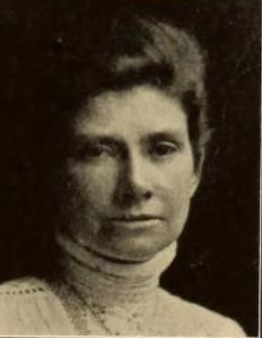
- Elizabeth Kemper Adams, from the 1910 yearbook of Smith College
- Born: October 24, 1872; Nashotah, Wisconsin, U.S.
- Died: December 14, 1948 (aged 76); Brattleboro, Vermont, U.S.
- Resting place: Conway, Massachusetts, U.S.
- Education: Kemper Hall; Vassar College; University of Chicago
- Occupations: Educator; historian
- Relatives: Jackson Kemper (great-grandfather)
- Scientific career
- Thesis: The Aesthetic Experience: Its Meaning in a Functional Psychology (1904)

Elizabeth Kemper Adams (October 24, 1872 – December 14, 1948) was an American psychologist and historian of education. She was a professor of philosophy and first head of the education department at Smith College from 1911 to 1916. In the 1920s, she was national educational secretary of the Girl Scouts of the USA.

== Early life ==
Adams was born in Nashotah, Wisconsin, the daughter of Francis (Frank) Kemper Adams and Mary Lee Whiting Adams. Her great-grandfather was Jackson Kemper, an Episcopal bishop in early Wisconsin. She graduated from Kemper Hall in 1889, and from Vassar College in 1893, and completed doctoral studies in philosophy at the University of Chicago in 1904. Her dissertation was titled "The Aesthetic Experience: Its Meaning in a Functional Psychology".

== Career ==
Adams taught at Kemper Hall, Western Reserve University and Vassar College as a young woman. She served as an alumna trustee of Vassar College. She also wrote poetry published in The Atlantic. She joined the faculty at Smith College as a philosophy professor in 1905, and became the first director of the school's education department in 1911. She retired from Smith College in 1916.

After Smith, Adams continued doing research and giving lectures on women's education. During World War I she worked in the United States Employment Service in Washington, D.C., and published a study of women in professional employment for the Women's Educational and Industrial Union in 1921.

Adams was educational secretary of the Girl Scouts' national organization in the 1920s. She spoke to the Eleventh Recreation Congress on "The Energies of Girls" in 1924, traveled nationally, including to Hawaii, as a Girl Scouting leader in 1924, and co-wrote a study of leadership training for the Girl Scouts in 1927.

== Publications ==
- "To Master Edmund Rostand" (1901)
- "The Lift of the Heart" (1904)
- "Some Fundamentals in the Teaching of Written Composition" (1904)
- The Aesthetic experience: Its meaning in a functional psychology (1906)
- "I Died This Year Though Still I Glimpse the Sun" (1907)
- "Psychological Gains and Losses of the College Woman" (1910)
- The Vocational Opportunities of the College of Liberal Arts (1912)
- Women Professional Workers: A Study Made for the Women's Educational and Industrial Union (1921)
- College Students and their Communities (1923)
- "Girl Scouts Stand for Health" (1923)
- "The Energies of Girls" (1925)
- A Five-Year Experiment in Training Volunteer Group Leaders, 1922-1927 (1927, with Eleanor Perry Wood)

== Personal life ==
Adams died in Brattleboro, Vermont in 1948, at the age of 76, after a long illness. Her grave is in Conway, Massachusetts. The historical society in Conway has an unpublished manuscript of later poetry by Adams.
