= Anglican Catholic Church of Canada =

- Classification: Continuing Anglican
- Orientation: Traditional Anglican
- Polity: Episcopal
- Archbishop: Shane B. Janzen
- Associations: Traditional Anglican Church
- Region: Canada
- Headquarters: Cathedral Church of Saint John the Evangelist, Victoria BC
- Origin: 1979
- Separated from: Anglican Catholic Church
- Congregations: 12
- Official website: https://www.anglicancatholic.ca/

Coat of Arms of the Anglican Catholic Church of Canada: Argent a cross Gules between four Maltese crosses Azure, with the motto, “USQUE AD TERMINOS ORBIS TERRARUM” meaning “To the ends of the earth” (Psalm 72:8).

The Anglican Catholic Church of Canada (ACCC) (French: Église Catholique Anglicane du Canada) is a Continuing Anglican church that was founded in 1979 by traditional Anglicans who had separated from the Anglican Church of Canada. The ACCC has fifteen parishes and missions; with two bishops and 22 clergy.

== Affiliation ==
The Anglican Catholic Church of Canada is one of the churches that trace their origins to the Congress of St. Louis, the assembly that inaugurated the Continuing Anglican Movement and produced the Affirmation of St. Louis. The new church adopted the name, "Anglican Catholic Church." Its Canadian diocese shortly thereafter asked for and received a release from that body in order to become a self-governing Canadian church offering a traditional alternative to the more liberal Anglican Church of Canada.

The Anglican Catholic Church of Canada is a founding member of the Traditional Anglican Communion (TAC), established in 1990. The ACCC is the third-largest of the Anglican churches in Canada, after the Anglican Church of Canada and the Anglican Church in North America.

== Traditional worship and morality ==
The founding members of the Anglican Catholic Church of Canada were dissatisfied with decisions made by the Anglican Church of Canada (ACC) to confer priestly ordination upon women and to make liturgical reforms that would evolve into the Book of Alternative Services. The ACCC continues to maintain an all-male clergy and recently has criticised what it considers to be the parent church's increasing acceptance of homosexuality. The church uses the 1962 Book of Common Prayer exclusively and rejects the possibility of remarriage after divorce.

== Structure ==
The ACCC has parishes and missions throughout Canada. Most ACCC congregations are small, but the church continues to experience growth, particularly in the larger centres. The first bishop of the ACCC was Bishop Carmino de Catanzaro, who served until his death in 1983. The successive bishops, in order, were Bishop Alfred Woolcock, Bishop Robert Mercer, and Bishop Peter Wilkinson. In March 2013, the Very Reverend Shane Janzen was consecrated fifth diocesan and metropolitan bishop in Victoria, British Columbia. On November 1, 2014, the ACCC created two dioceses, one for the Western Canada (Diocese of Canada West) and one for the East (Diocese of Canada East), each with its own Bishop Ordinary. On October 14, 2016, the college of bishops elected Archbishop Shane B. Janzen as the third primate of the Traditional Anglican Communion.

== Proposed ordinariate within the Roman Catholic Church ==
Until 2012, the TAC discussed a form of union with the Roman Catholic Church and stated that it had no doctrinal differences with Rome sufficient to prevent the success of this proposal. In October 2009, the ACCC welcomed an initiative from Pope Benedict XVI to create personal ordinariates for Anglicans. On March 12, 2010, the ACCC formally requested the erection of an ordinariate in Canada. Subsequent to the petition, seven of thirty-five parish groups (one fifth) removed themselves from the ACCC. To provide a means for some clergy and laity to join the Roman Catholic Church, in November 2011 the ACCC divided into two non-geographical dioceses: the original Diocese of Canada (for parishes and individuals not entering the ordinariate) and the Pro-Diocese of Our Lady of Walsingham (for parishes and individuals entering the ordinariate). On April 15, 2012, Bishop Peter Wilkinson and Bishop Carl Reid resigned their episcopal office and orders, and were received into the Roman Catholic Church as laymen. Bishop Craig Botterill became apostolic administrator until the election of the new diocesan bishop, the Right Reverend Shane Janzen, in November 2012. The remaining Diocese of Canada explicitly stated that it "will remain an Anglican church" and not enter the Personal Ordinariate of the Chair of Saint Peter.

== Anglican Joint Synods ==
In 2017, four Continuing Anglican churches in America, the Anglican Catholic Church, the Anglican Province of America, the Diocese of the Holy Cross, and the Anglican Church in America (TAC) signed a communio in sacris agreement, pledging to pursue corporate unity. The bishops of the Anglican Catholic Church of Canada released a statement that "it is our hope and prayer that this initiative will lead to further ecumenical dialogue, cooperation and reconciliation between and among the Continuing Anglican Churches around the world, as well as here in Canada."

On 16 February 2022, it was announced that the TAC has entered into an agreement of full sacramental communion (communio in sacris) with the Anglican Province of America.

== Saint Bede’s Anglican Catholic Theological College ==
Saint Bede’s Anglican Catholic Theological College was established in 2001 to serve the needs of the Anglican Catholic Church of Canada and Traditional Anglican Church as well as other Continuing Anglican Churches. It offers courses leading to Bachelor in Theology (B.Th.), Master of Divinity (M.Div.), or Master of Theological Studies (M.T.S) degrees. In 2018 Saint Bede’s Anglican Catholic Theological College was accredited by Accreditation Service for International Schools, Colleges and Universities (ASIC).

== Publications ==
The Anglican Catholic Church of Canada issues a newsletter called The Anglican Catholic Chronicle, containing news and information.
