= James Orin Mote =

James Orin Mote (January 27, 1922 – April 29, 2006) was a founding member of the Continuing Anglican movement.

An alumnus of Canterbury College (Danville, Indiana) and Nashotah House Theological Seminary, he was Rector of St. Mary's Church in Denver, Colorado, which left The Episcopal Church soon after the decision at the 1976 General Convention to allow the ordination of women. He was later deposed from The Episcopal Church and was consecrated bishop in the Anglican Catholic Church. He was elected as the first bishop of the Diocese of the Holy Trinity in 1977, and consecrated on 28 January 1978 by Bishops Albert A. Chambers, Francisco Paktaghan, and Charles Doren, at Augustana Lutheran Church in Denver, Colorado. He served as Bishop of the Diocese until 1994, when he resigned and retired to live initially in Florida, but later in Indiana. He died on April 29, 2006, in Indianapolis.

Anglican Catholic Church titles
Preceded by Charles Doren (Senior Bishop)	Metropolitan Original Province; 1981–1983	Succeeded by Louis Falk
Preceded by New title	Bishop Ordinary Diocese of the Holy Trinity; 1978–1994	Succeeded by Stephen Scarlett
