= Elizabeth Laura Adams =

African-American writer (1909–1982)

Elizabeth Laura Adams (1909–1982) was an African-American Catholic writer, best known for her autobiography Dark Symphony (1942).

== Early life ==
Elizabeth Laura Adams was born in Santa Barbara, California on February 9, 1909 to Lula Josphine and Daniel Adams, Adams grew up in the Depression era. After her father's death, Adams converted to Catholicism.

== Reception ==
Reception of Dark Symphony was very good, with it being a bestseller among Catholics.

== Works ==
- Consecrated (1936)
- The Country Doctor (1942)
- The Art of Living Joyfully (1942)
- Dark Symphony (1942)
- Children under Fire (1943)
