= Anglican Diocese of Quincy =

Anglican diocese in the United States

- Cathedral of St. John in Quincy, Illinois

Location
- Ecclesiastical province: Anglican Church in North America

Statistics
- Parishes: 34 (2025)
- Members: 3,886 (2025)

Information
- Rite: Anglican
- Established: 1877
- Cathedral: St. John's Cathedral, Quincy

Current leadership
- Bishop: Juan Alberto Morales

Website
- dioceseofquincy.org

The Anglican Diocese of Quincy is a member of the Anglican Church in North America and is made up of 32 congregations, principally in Illinois but also in Wisconsin, Minnesota, Texas, Iowa, Nebraska, Missouri, Hawai'i, Colorado, Tennessee, and Florida in the United States. The diocese was a founding member of the Anglican Church in North America in 2009.

The Diocese of Quincy was founded in 1877 and was part of the Episcopal Church until a majority of the diocesan synod voted to leave in November 2009 and to associate with Anglican Province of the Southern Cone as part of the Anglican realignment movement. After the synod, statements from the Episcopal Church and the Southern Cone express conflicting views of what constitutes the diocese.

After leaving The Episcopal Church, St. Andrew's Church Peoria, Illinois in Peoria, became the cathedral after St. Paul's Episcopal Church Peoria, Illinois, voted on December 4, 2008, by 181 to 35, to not be "realigned" or "removed" from the Episcopal Church.

The offices of the Diocese of Quincy are located in Peoria, however, the Diocese retained the name of the location of its original see city, Quincy, and its original and current cathedral of St. John's, in order to lessen confusion with the Roman Catholic Diocese of Peoria.

Juan Alberto Morales, the founder and first abbot of Saint Benedict's Abbey in Bartonville, Illinois, was elected as the 9th Bishop of the Diocese of Quincy on September 18, 2010. He was installed by Robert Duncan, Archbishop of the Anglican Church in North America.

Keith L. Ackerman was bishop from June 24, 1994 until his resignation on November 1, 2008. He is a member of Forward in Faith, the Society of King Charles the Martyr, the Confraternity of the Blessed Sacrament, the Guild of All Souls, the Society of Mary, and the Society of Our Lady of Walsingham.

== Anglican realignment ==
The diocese does not ordain women to the presbyterate, but does have eight female deacons. As of 2006 it was one of only three dioceses in the Episcopal Church that did not ordain women to the priesthood; the other two were the Diocese of San Joaquin, whose convention voted to secede from the Episcopal Church in December 2007, and the Diocese of Fort Worth, whose convention voted in November 2008 to secede.

In 2006, the Diocese issued a news release saying that it was "unwilling to accept the leadership" of Presiding Bishop Katharine Jefferts Schori, and passed resolutions asking for "alternative pastoral oversight" and withdrawing consent to be included in Province 5 of the Episcopal Church in the United States of America.

On November 7, 2008, the 131st Synod of the Diocese of Quincy voted to leave the Episcopal Church and join the Anglican Province of the Southern Cone. As Ackerman's resignation as bishop took effect on November 1, Edward den Blaauwen of Moline, Illinois, was appointed to preside over the synod.

The major resolutions, which both passed, were to annul the diocese's accession to the constitution and canons of The Protestant Episcopal Church in the United States of America, and to join the Anglican Province of the Southern Cone. After the vote to realign passed, it was announced that Archbishop Gregory Venables of the Southern Cone appointed den Blaauwen as vicar general in the absence of a sitting bishop.

Also passed by the synod were: a resolution that parishes may withdraw from "the Synod of this Diocese" by a two-thirds vote within the following nine months, and clergy may transfer to other dioceses; a resolution that other parishes outside the geographic boundaries may join the synod of the diocese; funding for the Province of the Southern Cone and the Anglican Communion Network; support for the Common Cause Partnership; and a new diocesan canon to govern marriage, defined as being between "one man and one woman".

The Episcopal Church's Presiding Bishop, Katharine Jefferts Schori, stated that "The Episcopal Diocese of Quincy remains, albeit with fewer members". The legitimacy of other secession actions has been actively challenged by The Episcopal Church, which takes the position that dioceses and parishes may not leave without the Episcopal Church's governing bodies. As a consequence, the long-term effect of these votes is unclear, as with similar cases in the Episcopal Diocese of San Joaquin and the Episcopal Diocese of Pittsburgh; both of those two dioceses have split into two factions, with each faction claiming to be the legitimate succession of the traditional diocese. Neither secession nor annulment of accession is provided for by the Constitution and Canons of the Episcopal Church. The Constitution and Canons of the Province of the Southern Cone allow only dioceses in the six southern nations of South America, but the Province of the Southern Cone has agreed to accept realigning dioceses "on an emergency and pastoral basis". None of these three dioceses was listed as part of the Province of the Southern Cone by the Anglican Communion office.

In 2025, the Diocese of Quincy reported 34 congregations (up from 32 in 2022) with 3,886 members and 2,110 in average Sunday attendance.
