= Nashotah, Wisconsin =

- Village
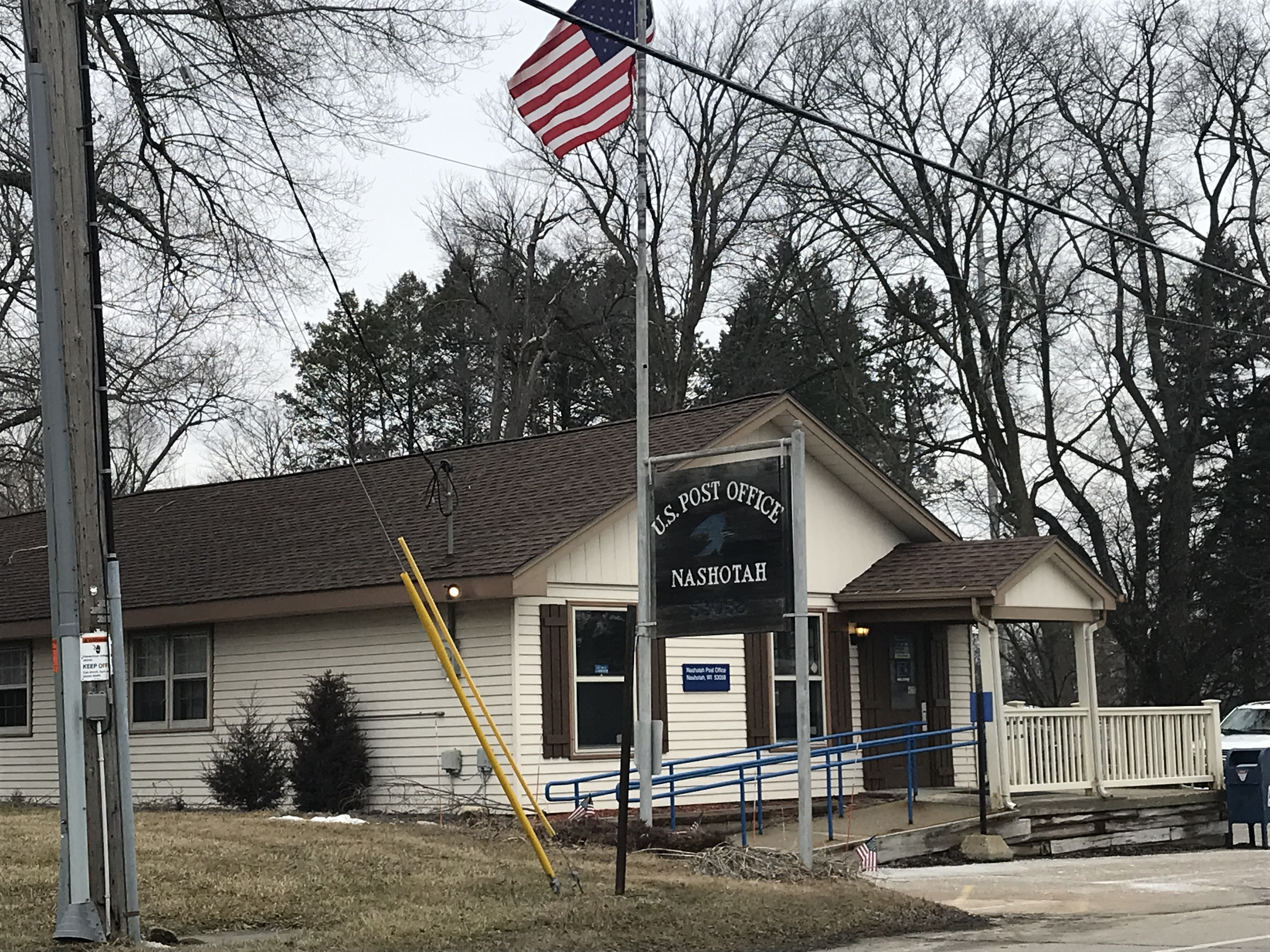

- Location of Nashotah in Waukesha County, Wisconsin.
- Coordinates: 43°5′41″N 88°24′2″W
- Country: United States
- State: Wisconsin
- County: Waukesha

Government
  - Type: Village Board (President - Trustees)
  - President: Richard H. Lartz

Area
  - Total: 1.66 sq mi (4.31 km^{2})
  - Land: 1.64 sq mi (4.24 km^{2})
  - Water: 0.027 sq mi (0.07 km^{2})
- Elevation: 942 ft (287 m)

Population (2020)
  - Total: 1,321
  - Density: 829.9/sq mi (320.41/km^{2})
- Time zone: UTC-6 (Central (CST))
  - Summer (DST): UTC-5 (CDT)
- FIPS code: 55-55550
- GNIS feature ID: 1570108
- Website: www.nashotah-wi.gov

Nashotah is a village in Waukesha County, Wisconsin, United States. The population was 1,321 at the 2020 census. The village took its name from the nearby Nashotah Lakes.

== Education ==
The following schools are currently located in Nashotah:

- Nashotah House, a seminary of The Episcopal Church.
- St. Joan of Arc, a Roman Catholic school, serving grades preschool through eighth grade.

The following schools were formerly located in Nashotah:

- Lake Country Christian Academy, a private grade school (now closed).

== Geography ==
Nashotah is located at 43°5′41″N 88°24′2″W (43.094705, -88.400658); in the Lake Country area of Waukesha County.

According to the United States Census Bureau, the village has a total area of 1.70 square miles (4.40 km^{2}), of which 1.67 square miles (4.33 km^{2}) is land and 0.03 square miles (0.08 km^{2}) is water.

== Demographics ==
Historical population
Census	Pop.	Note	%±
1960	321		—
1970	410		27.7%
1980	513		25.1%
1990	567		10.5%
2000	1,266		123.3%
2010	1,395		10.2%
2020	1,321		−5.3%
U.S. Decennial Census

=== 2010 census ===
As of the census of 2010, there were 1,395 people, 517 households, and 400 families living in the village. The population density was 835.3 inhabitants per square mile (322.5/km^{2}). There were 541 housing units at an average density of 324.0 per square mile (125.1/km^{2}). The racial makeup of the village was 96.6% White, 0.1% African American, 0.5% Native American, 1.4% Asian, 0.1% from other races, and 1.2% from two or more races. Hispanic or Latino of any race were 1.4% of the population.

There were 517 households, of which 39.8% had children under the age of 18 living with them, 67.9% were married couples living together, 6.8% had a female householder with no husband present, 2.7% had a male householder with no wife present, and 22.6% were non-families. 19.3% of all households were made up of individuals, and 10.1% had someone living alone who was 65 years of age or older. The average household size was 2.70 and the average family size was 3.12.

The median age in the village was 43 years. 29.5% of residents were under the age of 18; 4.2% were between the ages of 18 and 24; 20.4% were from 25 to 44; 33.8% were from 45 to 64; and 12.1% were 65 years of age or older. The gender makeup of the village was 49.2% male and 50.8% female.

=== 2000 census ===
As of the census of 2000, there were 1,266 people, 445 households, and 364 families living in the village. The population density was 781.4 people per square mile (301.7/km^{2}). There were 455 housing units at an average density of 280.8 per square mile (108.4/km^{2}). The racial makeup of the village was 98.82% White, 0.16% African American, 0.16% Native American, 0.24% Asian, 0.08% Pacific Islander, 0.08% from other races, and 0.47% from two or more races. Hispanic or Latino of any race were 1.03% of the population.

There were 445 households, out of which 43.4% had children under the age of 18 living with them, 74.2% were married couples living together, 5.8% had a female householder with no husband present, and 18.0% were non-families. 14.6% of all households were made up of individuals, and 4.5% had someone living alone who was 65 years of age or older. The average household size was 2.84 and the average family size was 3.19.

In the village, the population was spread out, with 30.4% under the age of 18, 5.1% from 18 to 24, 28.9% from 25 to 44, 26.6% from 45 to 64, and 8.9% who were 65 years of age or older. The median age was 38 years. For every 100 females, there were 96.6 males. For every 100 females age 18 and over, there were 92.8 males.

The median income for a household in the village was $77,406, and the median income for a family was $82,949. Males had a median income of $60,536 versus $37,750 for females. The per capita income for the village was $29,581. About 0.8% of families and 1.3% of the population were below the poverty line, including 1.0% of those under age 18 and 5.0% of those age 65 or over.

== Attractions ==
Nashotah is the home of the oldest restaurant in the state, The Red Circle Inn. Founded in 1848 on the Watertown Plank Road, the Red Circle Inn was a resting place for stagecoaches and early settlers. The Pabst Brewing family bought the inn in 1889 and it soon become the place to be for sophisticates summering in their mansions on the area lakes.

== Notable people ==
- Elizabeth Kemper Adams (1872–1948), American educator, born in Nashotah
