= Episcopal Diocese of Quincy =

Former diocese of the Episcopal Church in western Illinois

Diocese of Quincy

Location
- Ecclesiastical province: V

Statistics
- Parishes: 20

Information
- Cathedral: St. Paul's, Peoria

Map
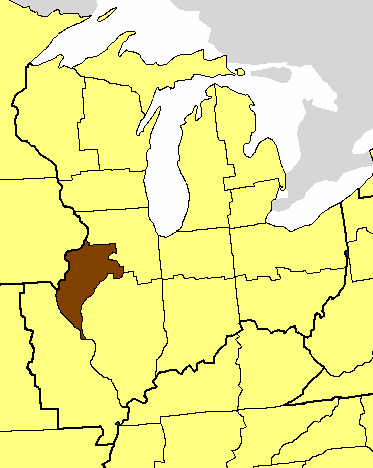
- Former location of the Diocese of Quincy

The Diocese of Quincy was a diocese of the Episcopal Church in western Illinois from 1877 to 2013. The cathedral seat (home of the diocese) was originally in Quincy, Illinois but was moved to St. Paul's Cathedral in Peoria in 1963. In order to avoid confusion with the Roman Catholic Diocese of Peoria, the diocese retained the name of the location of its original "home" city, Quincy, where its cathedral seat was St. John's.

In November 2008, a majority of the diocesan synod (or diocesan convention) voted to leave the Episcopal Church and associate with Anglican Province of the Southern Cone, a member province of the worldwide Anglican Communion, as part of the conservative Anglican realignment movement. Those parishes and parishioners who did not vote to leave the Episcopal Church remained and continued as the Diocese of Quincy which, in 2013, merged into the Episcopal Diocese of Chicago.

== Anglican realignment ==
The diocese did not ordain women to the presbyterate, but does have two female deacons. As of 2006 it was one of three dioceses in the Episcopal Church that did not ordain women; the other two were the Diocese of San Joaquin, whose convention voted to secede from the Episcopal Church in December 2007, and the Diocese of Fort Worth, whose convention voted in November 2008 to secede.

In 2006, the diocese issued a news release saying that it was "unwilling to accept the leadership" of the Presiding Bishop, Katharine Jefferts Schori, and passed resolutions asking for "alternative pastoral oversight" and withdrawing consent to be included in Province 5 of the Episcopal Church in the United States of America.

On November 7, 2008, the 131st Synod of the Diocese of Quincy voted to leave the Episcopal Church and instead join the Anglican Province of the Southern Cone. As Keith Ackerman's resignation as bishop took effect on November 1, Edward den Blaauwen of Moline, Illinois was appointed to preside over the synod.

The major resolutions, which both passed, were to annul the diocese's accession to the constitution and canons of the Protestant Episcopal Church in the United States of America and to join the Anglican Province of the Southern Cone. After the vote to realign passed, it was announced that Archbishop Gregory Venables of the Southern Cone diocese appointed den Blaauwen as vicar general in the absence of a sitting bishop.

Also passed by the synod were: a resolution that parishes may withdraw from "the Synod of this Diocese" by a two-thirds vote within the following nine months, and clergy may transfer to other dioceses; a resolution seeking an amicable settlement regarding diocesan assets with the Episcopal Church and any congregations that might seek to remain in the Episcopal Church; a resolution that other parishes outside the geographic boundaries may join the synod of the diocese; funding for the Province of the Southern Cone and the Anglican Communion Network; support for the Common Cause Partnership; and a new diocesan canon to govern marriage, defined as being between "one man and one woman".

The Episcopal Church's Presiding Bishop, Katharine Jefferts Schori, stated that "The Episcopal Diocese of Quincy remains, albeit with fewer members." The legitimacy of other secession actions has been actively challenged by the Episcopal Church, which takes the position that dioceses and parishes may not leave without the Episcopal Church's governing bodies. As a consequence, the long-term effect of these votes is unclear, as with similar cases in the Episcopal Diocese of San Joaquin and the Episcopal Diocese of Pittsburgh; those two dioceses have each split into two factions, with each faction claiming to be the legitimate succession of the traditional diocese. Neither secession nor annulment of accession is either prohibited or provided for by the Constitution and Canons of the Episcopal Church. The Constitution and Canons of the Province of the Southern Cone allow only dioceses in the six southern nations of South America, but the Province of the Southern Cone has agreed to accept realigning dioceses "on an emergency and pastoral basis".

An executive committee was elected at the cathedral on December 13, 2008, to carry out the business of the committee to Reorganize the Diocese of Quincy, in communion with the Episcopal Church, particularly to organize a special synod of the Diocese of Quincy to elect a standing committee and other officials of the diocese. Keith Whitmore, assistant bishop of the Diocese of Atlanta, retired bishop of the Diocese of Eau Claire, Wisconsin, served the Diocese of Quincy, as consulting bishop, until a special synod, held at the cathedral on April 4, 2009. The synod elected John Clark Buchanan, retired Bishop of West Missouri, as provisional bishop.

== Reunification ==
In February 2012 representatives of the Diocese of Quincy and the Diocese of Chicago met in Peoria to discuss reunification of the two dioceses. The meetings in Peoria ended with a decision to continue talks.

On April 28, 2012, leaders from both dioceses met to further discuss reunification. Participants from both dioceses agreed to meet again in August, as well as to allocate time to discuss the issue at the annual diocesan wide conventions held by both dioceses. The participants also agreed to form a joint working group to discuss some of the legal issues involved with the process.

In November the Chicago diocese's convention agreed that reunification with the Quincy diocese should be pursued. On June 8, 2013, both diocesan conventions voted unanimously to reunify. The reunification was ratified by a majority of bishops and the standing committees of the Episcopal Church, and on September 1, 2013, the Diocese of Quincy merged into the Diocese of Chicago as the Peoria Deanery.

== Bishops ==
1. Alexander Burgess, 1878-1901
2. Frederick W. Taylor, 1901-1903
3. M. Edward Fawcett, 1904-1935
4. William Leopold Essex, 1936-1958
5. Francis W. Lickfield, 1958-1973
6. Donald J. Parsons, 1973-1988
7. Edward Harding MacBurney, 1988-1994
8. Keith Ackerman, 1994-2008
