= St. Paul's Episcopal Church (Peoria, Illinois) =

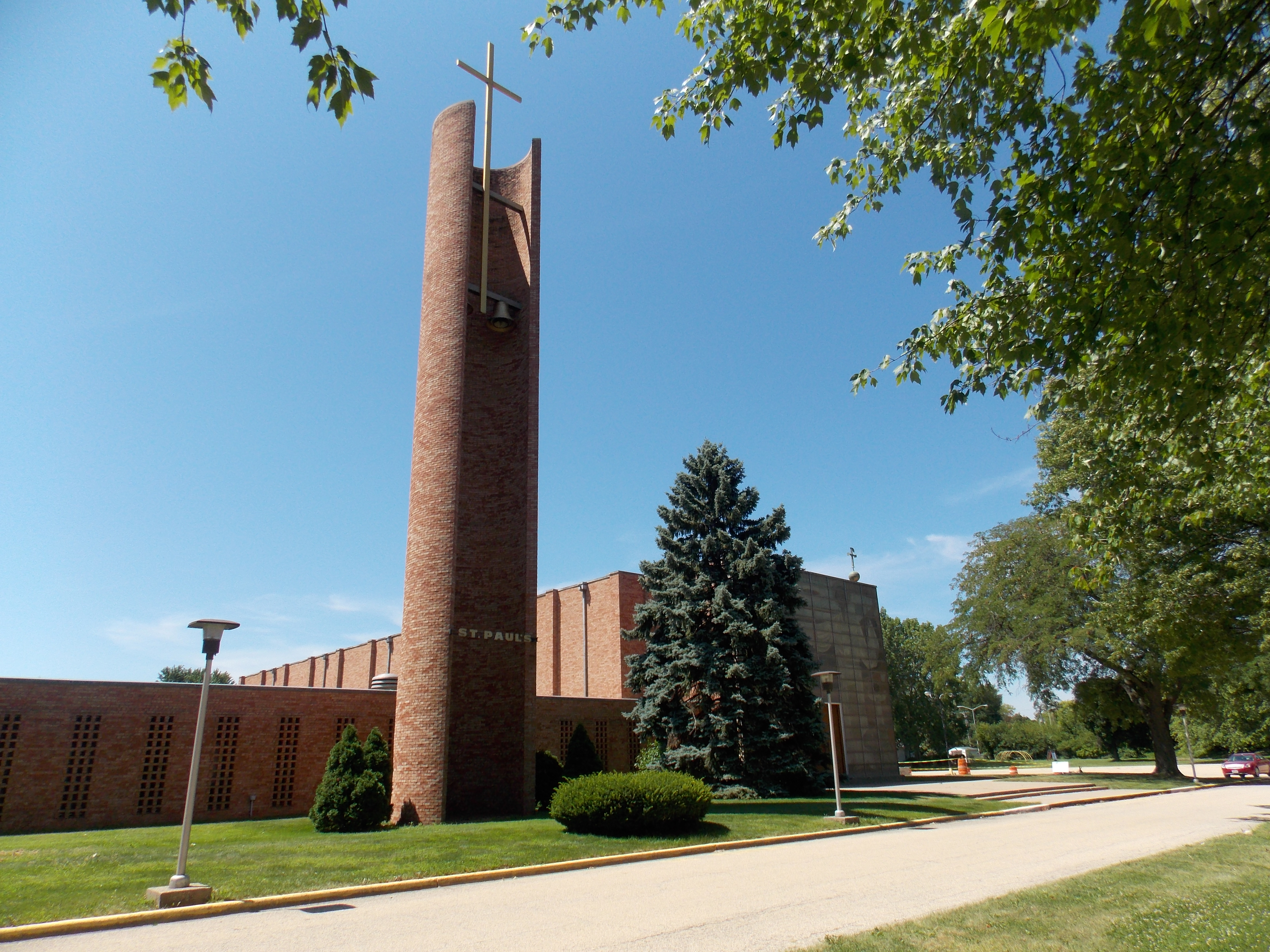

- St. Paul's location in Peoria County
- 40°43′53.81″N 89°35′58.82″W
- Location: 3601 N. North St. Peoria, Illinois
- Country: United States
- Denomination: Episcopal Church in the United States of America
- Website: www.stpaulspeoria.com

History
- Status: Parish church
- Founded: 1834
- Consecrated: 1963

Architecture
- Style: Modern
- Completed: 1959

Administration
- Diocese: Chicago

Clergy
- Bishop: Rt. Rev. Paula E. Clark
- Rector: Rev. C. Christian Pierce, Priest in Charge

St. Paul's Episcopal Church is an Episcopal parish church in Peoria, Illinois, United States. It is the former cathedral of the Diocese of Quincy.

== History ==
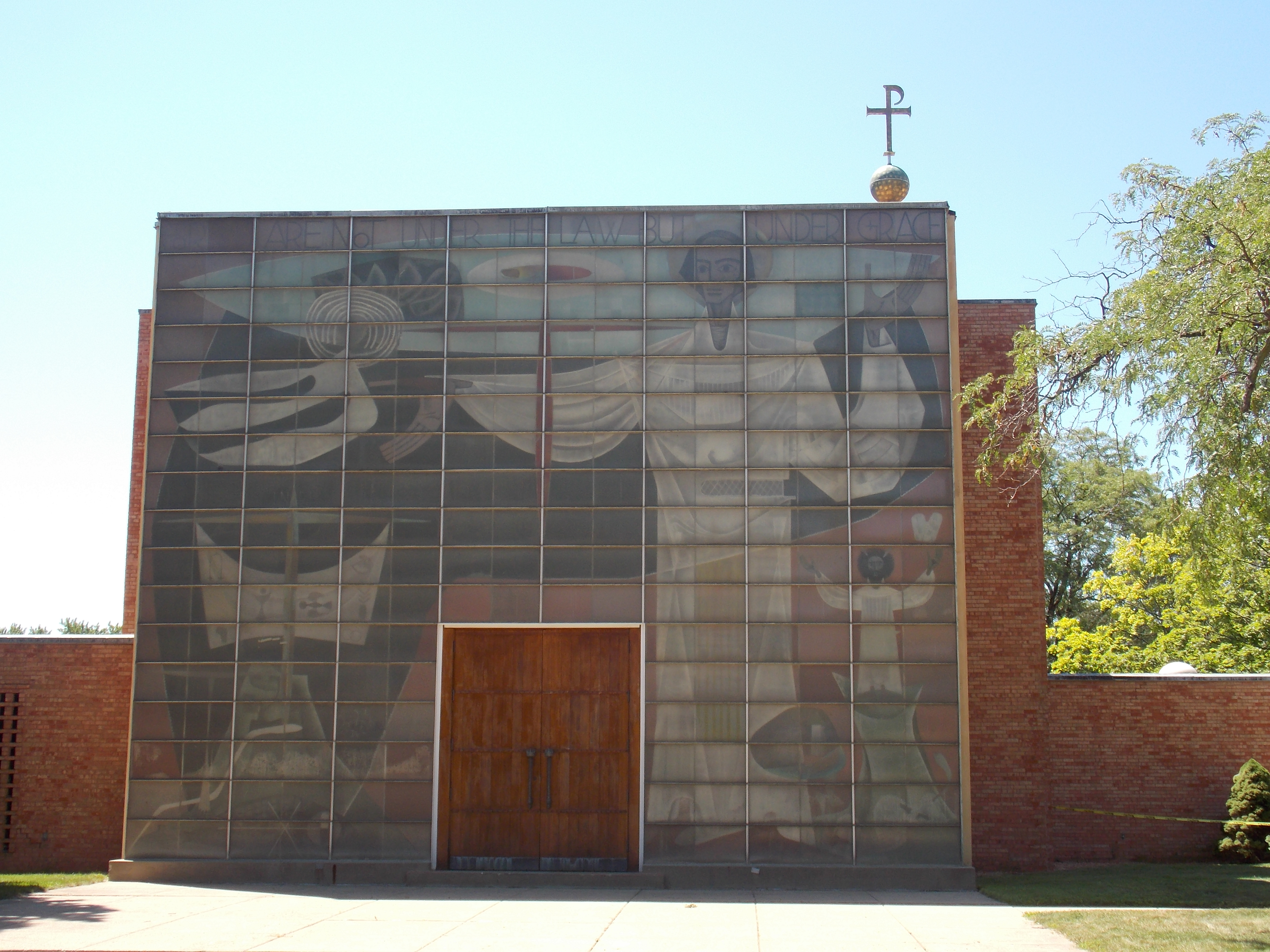
North façade

St. Paul's parish was founded as St. Jude's on October 27, 1834. The church was located on the southwest corner of Main and Monroe Streets. The cornerstone was laid by Bishop Philander Chase in 1849. The parish's name was changed to St. Paul in 1848. The building was finished and dedicated on September 15, 1850.

The parish outgrew its sandstone and wood building and updating the facility on a small plot of land was deemed impractical, so property was purchased outside of the downtown area. The present church building was completed in 1959 and it was consecrated in 1963. On May 7, 1962, St. Paul's was named the cathedral church of the Diocese of Quincy. An addition to accommodate diocesan offices was completed in 1968.

A majority of the parishes in the Diocese of Quincy left the Episcopal Church and joined the Anglican Church of the Southern Cone in November 2008. In 2012 the remaining parishes in the Episcopal Diocese of Quincy, including St. Paul's, approached the Diocese of Chicago about reunification. The two dioceses unanimously agreed to reunite on June 8, 2013. Part of the reunification agreement included St. Paul's becoming a parish church again and ceasing being a cathedral.
