= Nashotah House =

Anglo-catholic seminary in the United States

Nashotah House Theological Seminary
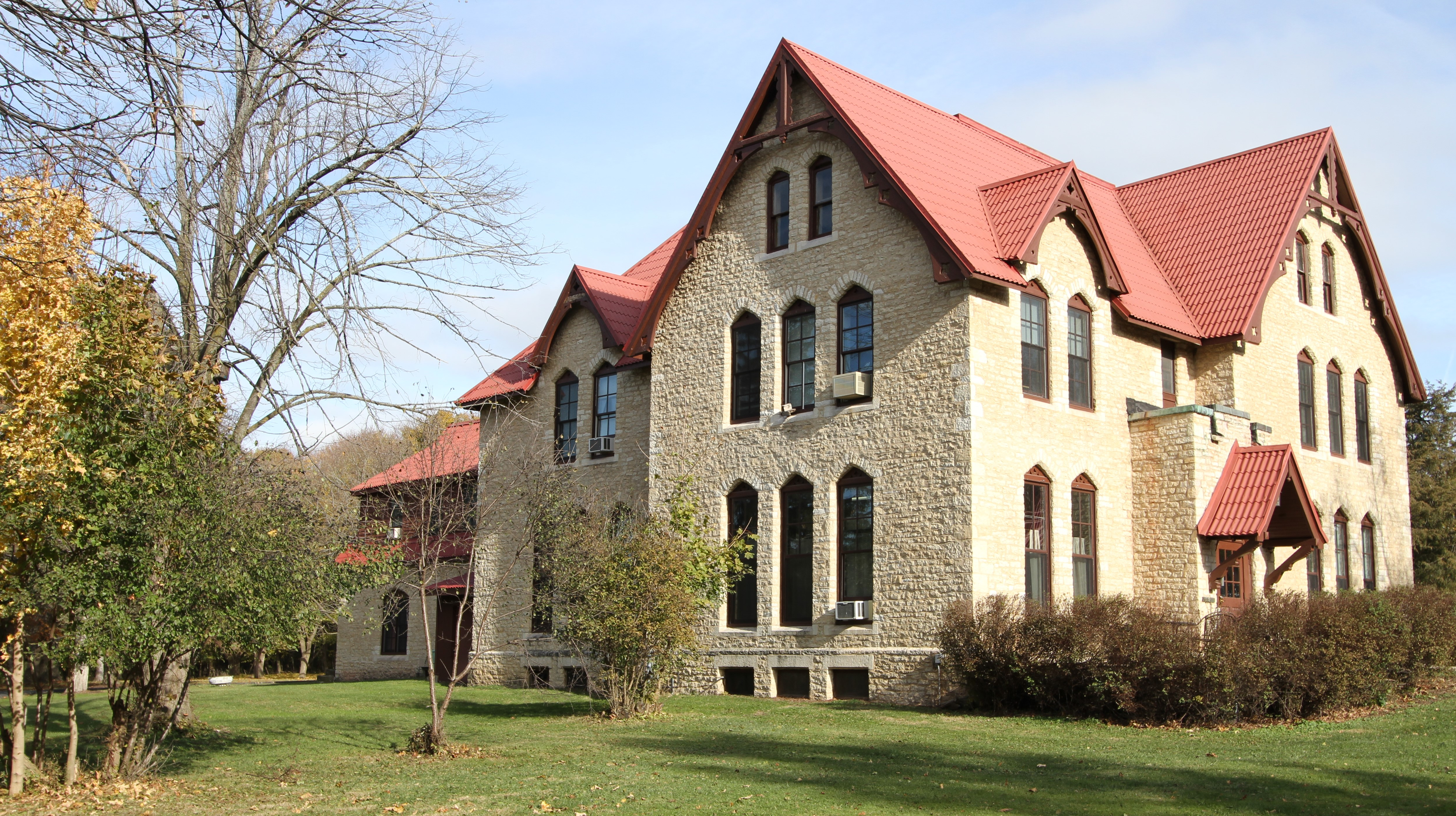
- Type: Private graduate institution
- Established: 1842; 184 years ago
- Affiliations: Association of Theological Schools in the United States and Canada (ATS), Wisconsin Association of Independent Colleges and Universities (WAICU)
- Religious affiliation: The Episcopal Church; Anglicanism; Anglo-Catholicism
- Endowment: $10-11 million (June 2022)
- Dean: Lauren Whitnah
- Faculty: 7
- Administrative staff: 22
- Students: 139
- Location: Nashotah, Wisconsin, United States; 43°4′56.5″N 88°25′33.5″W
- Campus: Rural
- Nicknames: The House, The Mission, Black Monks
- Website: www.nashotah.edu
- Nashotah House Theological Seminary
- U.S. National Register of Historic Places
- NRHP reference No.: 100000523
- Added to NRHP: January 12, 2017

Nashotah House is an Anglican seminary in Nashotah, Wisconsin. The seminary opened in 1842 and received its official charter in 1847. The institution is independent and generally regarded as one of the more theologically conservative seminaries in the Episcopal Church. It is also officially recognized by the Anglican Church in North America.

Nashotah House is the oldest institution of higher learning in Wisconsin. Its campus was listed on the National Register of Historic Places in 2017.

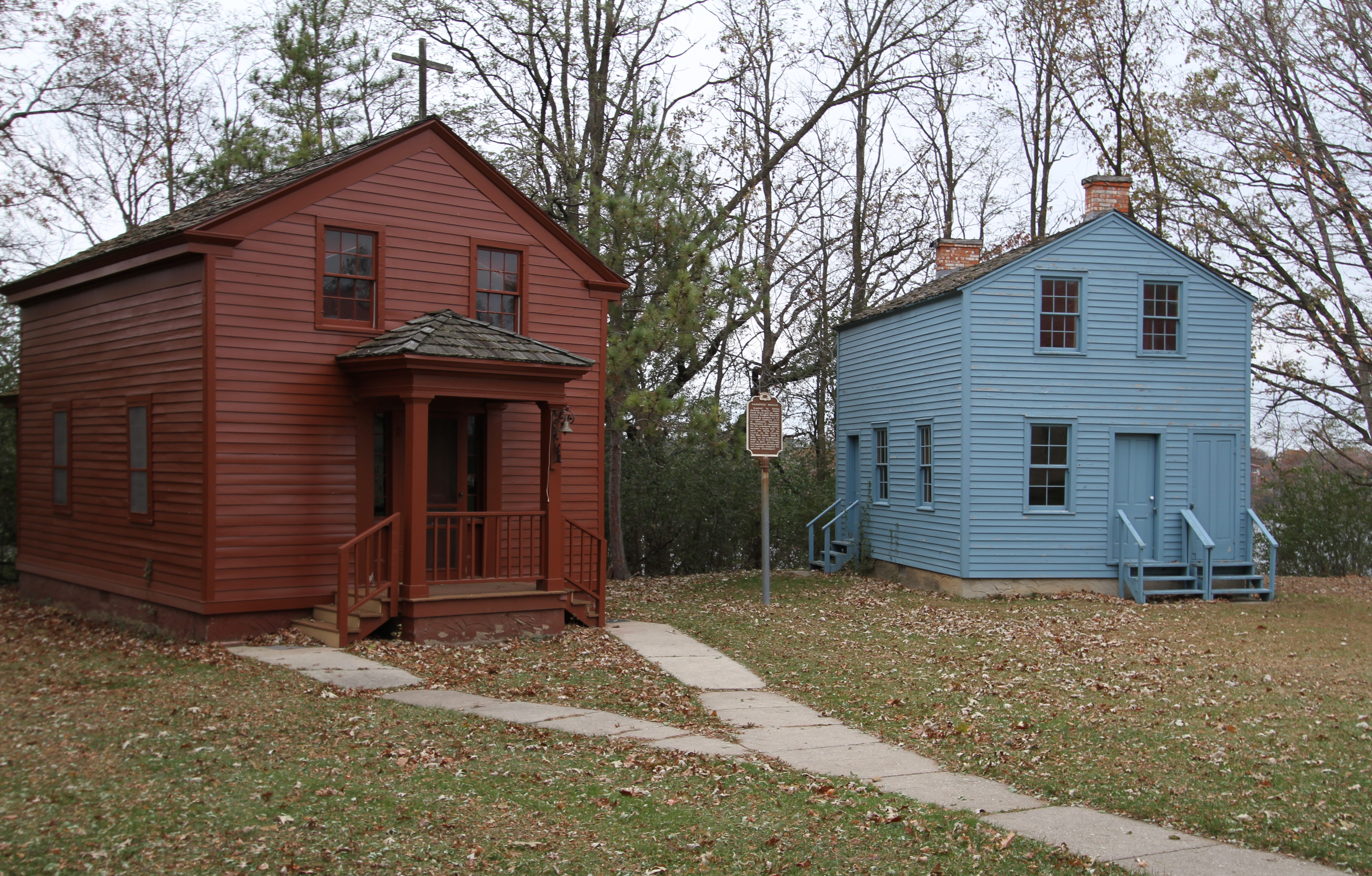
The oldest buildings on campus: Red Chapel and Blue House

Nashotah House Seminary and Nashotah House Foundation Inc. have EIN 11–3751035 as a 501(c)(3) Public Charity; in 2024 it reported $129,778 in total revenue and $1,133,308 in total assets.

== History ==
Nashotah House was founded in 1842 by three young deacons of the then-Protestant Episcopal Church: James Lloyd Breck, William Adams, and John Henry Hobart, Jr., who were all recent graduates of the General Theological Seminary in New York City. Bishop Jackson Kemper had asked them to undertake this task. Gustaf Unonius was the first graduate.

=== Theological tradition ===
Nashotah House was, from the beginning, a center for High Church thought and discipline. Breck served as the first dean, and was highly committed to the principles of the Oxford Movement, which in part revived liturgical practices. Later, noted professors such as James DeKoven would bring Anglo-Catholic worship and practice to the seminary. It included daily celebration of the Eucharist and the liturgical use of vestments, candles, and incense.

Nashotah identifies as being within the orthodox Anglo-Catholic tradition. Overall, the faculty support traditional theology and conceptions of Christian doctrine, in opposition to liberal theologies. Historically, the school had a reputation for admitting only high-church seminarians, although the school has sought to broaden its appeal to other forms of churchmanship. Nonetheless, as of 2023, Nashotah House was the only seminary affiliated with the Episcopal Church that does not admit students who have entered into same-sex marriages.

=== 21st century ===
In the 21st century, Nashotah House has dealt with various challenges associated with the 2009 split within The Episcopal Church, during which several theologically conservative parishes broke away to form the Anglican Church in North America. Unlike Trinity Anglican Seminary, which disaffiliated from TEC in 2022, Nashotah House remains affiliated with TEC, although it educates students from other denominations in the Anglican tradition. In 2023, 45% of seminarians were affiliated with TEC, 45% were affiliated with ACNA, and 10% were affiliated with other denominations. TEC students outnumber ACNA students in the residential M.Div. program.

Robert Munday led Nashotah House from 2001 to 2011. He was criticized for what some called his "overly sympathetic" attitude towards the ACNA. During his tenure, he also pushed to reconcile the precarious financial standing of the seminary by selling property, including lots on the banks of Upper Nashotah Lake.Azel Dow Cole was dean for 35 years.

Dean-Bishop Edward L. Salmon Jr. led the seminary from 2011 to 2015 with the goal of improving the seminary's relationship with TEC, particularly the Diocese of Milwaukee. In February 2014, Salmon invited the liberal TEC Presiding Bishop Katharine Jefferts Schori to preach at the school. Jefferts Schori had previously sought to steer away prospective students from Nashotah House. The decision was condemned by the seminary's largely conservative supporters, including ex-Dean Munday, who cited Jefferts Schori's policy of suing breakaway ACNA parishes to keep their resources within TEC, as well as what they considered her heretical views. Two bishops who were members of the Nashotah House Board of Trustees resigned or distanced themselves from the school; one of the bishops' dioceses had been sued by Jefferts Schori after joining the ACNA and not relinquishing property held in trust by TEC.

Salmon stepped down in 2015, although the chairman of the board stated that the resignation was "pre-planned" and not related to the Jefferts Schori controversy. He was succeeded by Steven Peay, who retired in 2017 citing health issues and other personal factors. During the mid-2010s, enrollment dipped significantly, falling from 110 full-time students (143 total) in 2012–13 to 52 full-time equivalent students in 2017.

Under Garwood Anderson (dean 2017–24), who made efforts to recruit ACNA members and low church adherents as seminarians, full-time equivalent enrollment rebounded from 52 to 119. Anderson stepped down and returned to the classroom in 2024. He was succeeded by religious historian Lauren Whitnah, the first woman to lead the seminary in 182 years.

The seminary typically runs at a significant deficit, and the endowment stood at $10-11 million in 2023; it was $10 million in 2011.

== Academics ==
Nashotah House offers degree and certificate programs aimed at training clergy and lay leaders for ministries in the Anglican Communion:

- Doctor of Ministry (DMin)
- Master of Sacred Theology (STM)
- Master of Divinity (MDiv)
- Master of Pastoral Ministry (MPM)
- Master of Theological Studies (MTS)
- Master of Ministry (MM)
- Master of Sacred Music (MSM)

It also offers a one-year certificate program in Anglican studies, geared toward students who have received an M.Div. from a non-Anglican institution and wish to be ordained within the Anglican tradition. The Master of Pastoral Ministry and the Master of Ministry degree may be earned through a combination of residential and online study.

The DMin, STM, MDiv, MPM, MTS, MM and MSM degrees are accredited by the Association of Theological Schools in the United States and Canada.

== Campus ==
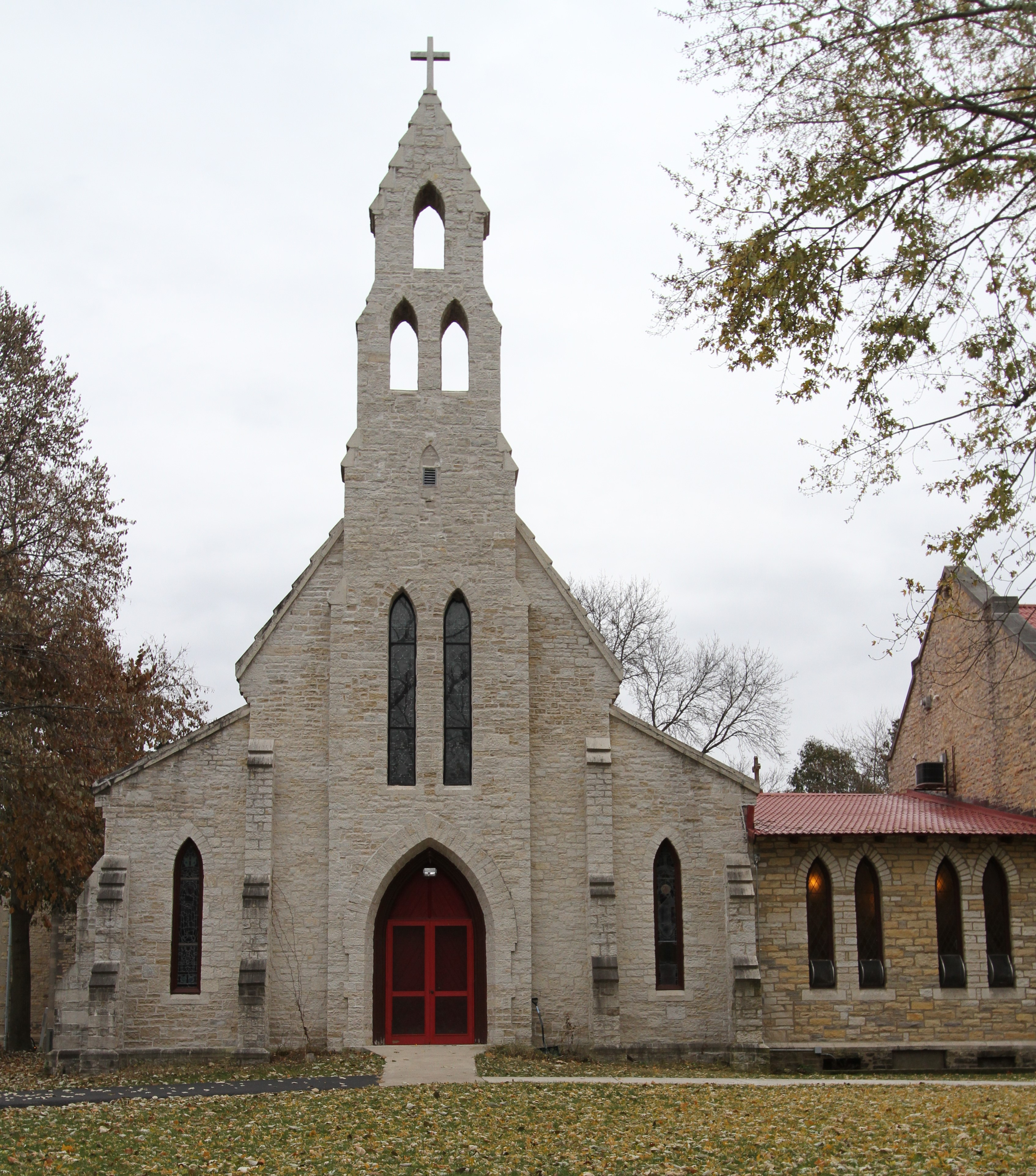
The Chapel of St. Mary the Virgin

The property of the Nashotah House Theological Seminary covers 365 acres (148 ha) of land.

The main buildings of the seminary include, from oldest:

- Chapel of St. Mary the Virgin, designed by James Douglas in Gothic Revival style and built in 1862.
- Webb Hall (faculty and guest housing, the Chapel of Saints Peter and Paul), Gothic Revival style, built 1865 and added to in 1926 and 1950.
- Shelton Hall (student housing), Gothic Revival style, built in 1869. Photo in box above.
- Sabine Hall (faculty offices, student housing), designed by Alexander Eschweiler in Gothic Revival style, built in 1892, and expanded in 1910.
- Lewis Hall (administration and faculty offices, the Saint Francis Oratory), designed by Eschweiler in Gothic Revival style and built in 1892.
- Frances Donaldson Memorial Library, designed by John B. Sutcliffe in Collegiate Gothic style, built in 1911, and expanded in 1982.
- Kemper Hall (classrooms, student housing, gymnasium), designed by Eschweiler & Eschweiler in Neogothic Revival style and built in 1956.
- James Lloyd Breck Refectory, designed by Eschweiler & Eschweiler and built in 1965.

There are also apartments for both single and married students, and several houses for the dean and other faculty, as well as maintenance facilities.

Construction has been completed on a substantial addition to the refectory. The newly dubbed Adams Hall includes a large meeting hall and additional classrooms.

== Student life ==
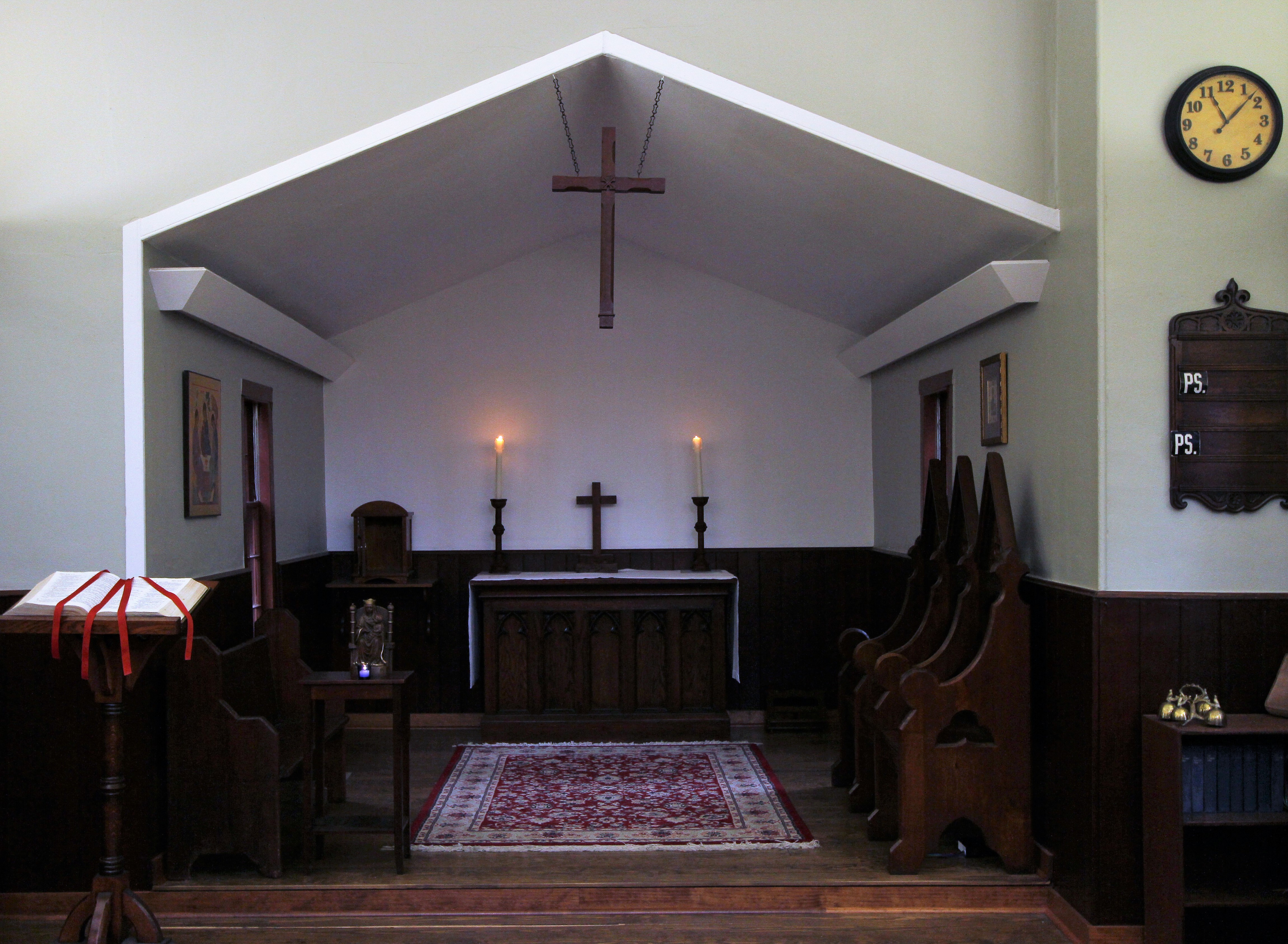
Interior of the Red Chapel

Nashotah began as a community inspired by traditional monastic life of prayer, work, and study. James Lloyd Breck's vision was to create a center for Christian formation in the (then) wilderness that would also be movement to propagate other communities for the purpose of evangelizing the frontier. Today, much of this vision remains intact and students still live a Benedictine cycle of prayer, work, and study. The life of the Seminary seeks to form the character of priests and leaders into the image of Christ. Various students have been involved in mission work around the Anglican Communion as well.

"Seminarians are invited to participate in an ascetic, disciplined, prayerful season of spiritual growth in Christ" in which they "practice the Benedictine Rule of daily prayer, labor, and study." All students have work crew assignments - cleaning bathrooms, mowing lawns, sweeping floors and taking other chores. Daily routine includes Morning Prayer, Mass, breakfast, classes, lunch, and choral Evensong. Always anticipated on the campus is the annual St. Laurence Cup, a flag football game played against students from Sacred Heart School of Theology and St. Francis Seminary (Wisconsin). The formerly annual Lavabo Bowl game was played against Seabury-Western Theological Seminary which stopped granting residential Master of Divinity degrees in 2010 after ceasing to accept new M.Div. seminarians in 2008

== Notable alumni ==
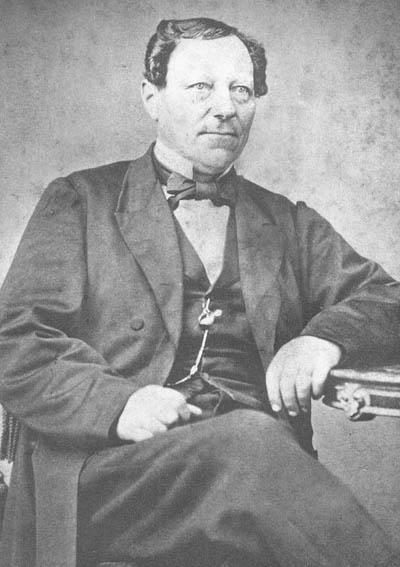
Gustaf Unonius, first graduate of Nashotah

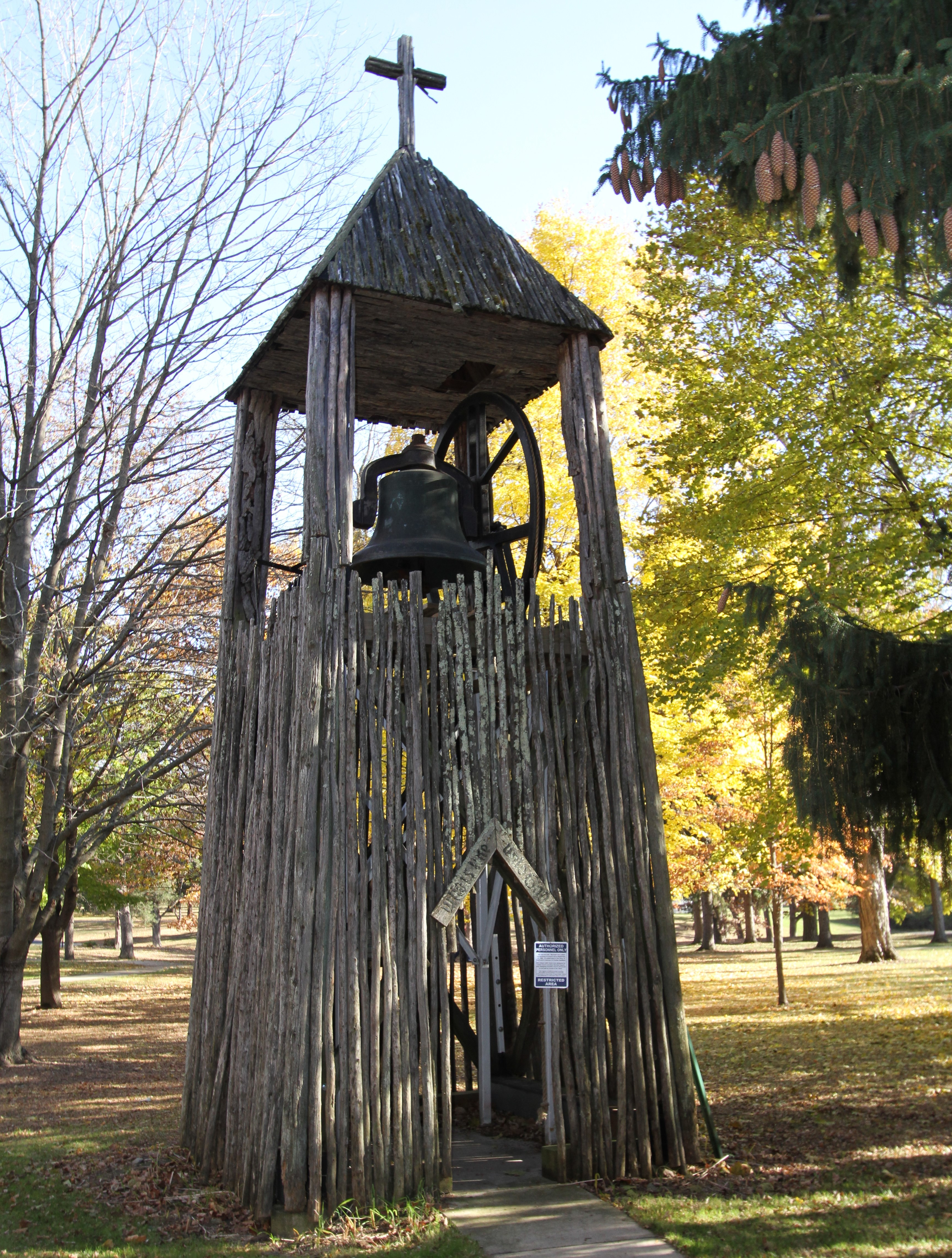
Michael the bell which calls the community to prayer

- Keith Ackerman (born 1946), Bishop of Quincy, resigned
- Daniel Corrigan (1900–1994), suffragan bishop of Colorado
- Darrell Critch, bishop of Mahajanga, Church of the Province of the Indian Ocean
- Robert Duncan (born 1948), archbishop, Anglican Church in North America; honorary doctorate
- Louis Falk (born 1935), bishop, Anglican Church in America
- Richard F. Grein (1934−2024) bishop of Kansas and New York
- Daniel W. Herzog (1941–2023), Bishop of Albany
- William Wallace Horstick (1902–1973), Bishop of Eau Claire
- Benjamin Franklin Price Ivins (1884–1962), Bishop of Milwaukee
- Russell Jacobus (1944–2023), Bishop of Fond du Lac
- Charles Jenkins (1951–2021), Bishop of Louisiana
- Hiram Kano (1889–1989), Japanese American priest
- Greg Kerr-Wilson, archbishop of the Diocese of Calgary, metropolitan of the Ecclesiastical Province of the Northern Lights, Anglican Church of Canada
- Christopher Kovacevich (1928–2010), metropolitan of Chicago, Serbian Orthodox Church
- William Jay Lambert III (born 1948), bishop of Eau Claire
- Jeffrey Lee, bishop of Chicago
- Charles Wesley Leffingwell (1840–1928), editor of The Living Church
- Edwin M. Leidel, Jr. (1938–2022), provisional bishop of Eau Claire
- William H. Love (born 1957), deposed bishop of Albany
- Fanuel Magangani, bishop of Northern Malawi
- Naboth Manzongo, bishop of Rupert's Land
- Taylor Marshall, Catholic convert, spiritual writer
- Esau McCaulley, African American biblical scholar at Wheaton College (Illinois)
- John McKim (1852–1936), bishop of North Tokyo
- Don Moon (born 1936), physicist, president of Shimer College
- James Orin Mote (1922–2006), bishop in the Anglican Catholic Church
- C. Wallis Ohl, Jr. (born 1943), provisional bishop of Fort Worth
- Alan M. Olson (born 1939), philosopher
- Mark Pae (born 1926), bishop of Taejong
- Jamie Parsley (born 1969), poet and priest
- Alexander Pryor, bishop of the Arctic
- Scott Seely (born 1981), bishop suffragan of All Nations
- William C. R. Sheridan (1917–2005), bishop of Northern Indiana
- Dabney Tyler Smith (1953–2024), bishop
- Harwood Sturtevant (1888–1977), bishop of Fond du Lac
- Gustaf Unonius (1810–1902), priest, author
- Reginald Heber Weller (1857–1935), bishop of Fond du Lac
- Keith Bernard Whitmore (born 1945), bishop of Eau Claire
- Gary Wilde (born 1952), priest, author
- Arthur E. Woolley (1931–2021), priest, activist

== Notable faculty ==
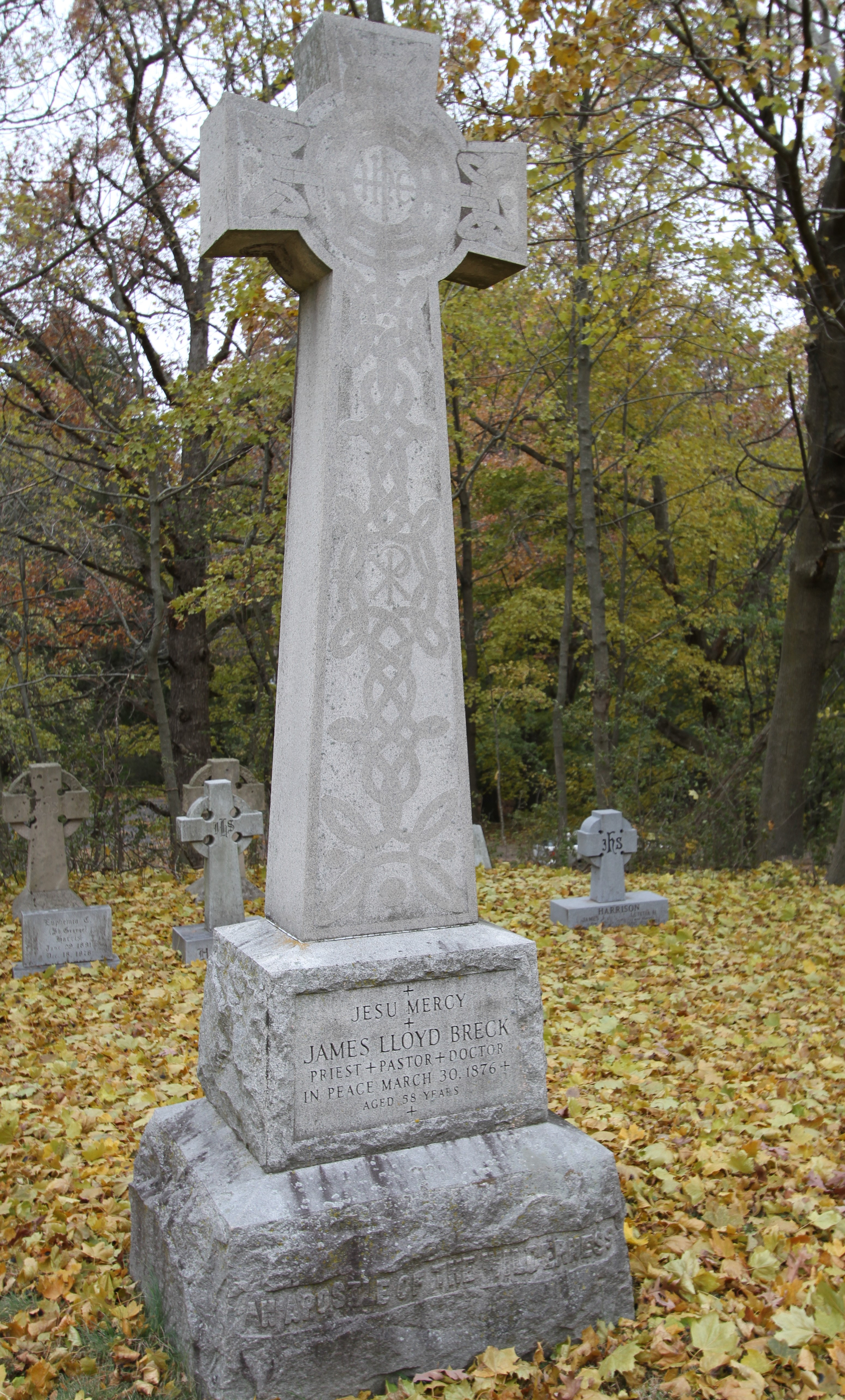
Grave of James Lloyd Breck in the Nashotah House Cemetery

- Hans Boersma (born 1961), chair to the Order of St. Benedict Servants of Christ Endowed Professorship in Ascetical Theology
- Richard Fish Cadle (1796–1857), first superior of Nashotah House
- James DeKoven (1831–1879), faculty member
- Walter C. Klein, (1904–1980) Dean-President 1959–63, Bishop of Northern Indiana
- Donald J. Parsons, (1922–2016), Professor, Dean-President 1950–1973, Bishop of Quincy
- Harry Boone Porter (1923–1999), professor, editor of The Living Church
- Michael Ramsey (1904–1988), Archbishop of Canterbury, adjunct professor
- Edward L. Salmon, Jr. (1934–2016) Dean-President 2011–15, bishop of South Carolina
- Arthur Anton Vogel (1924–2012), professor, bishop of West Missouri
- William Walter Webb (1857–1933), professor, president, bishop of Milwaukee
- Louis Weil (1935–2022), professor of liturgics
- Royden Yerkes (1881–1964)
