= All Saints' Cathedral (Milwaukee) =

Historic church in Wisconsin, United States

- All Saints’ Cathedral - Episcopal
- U.S. National Register of Historic Places
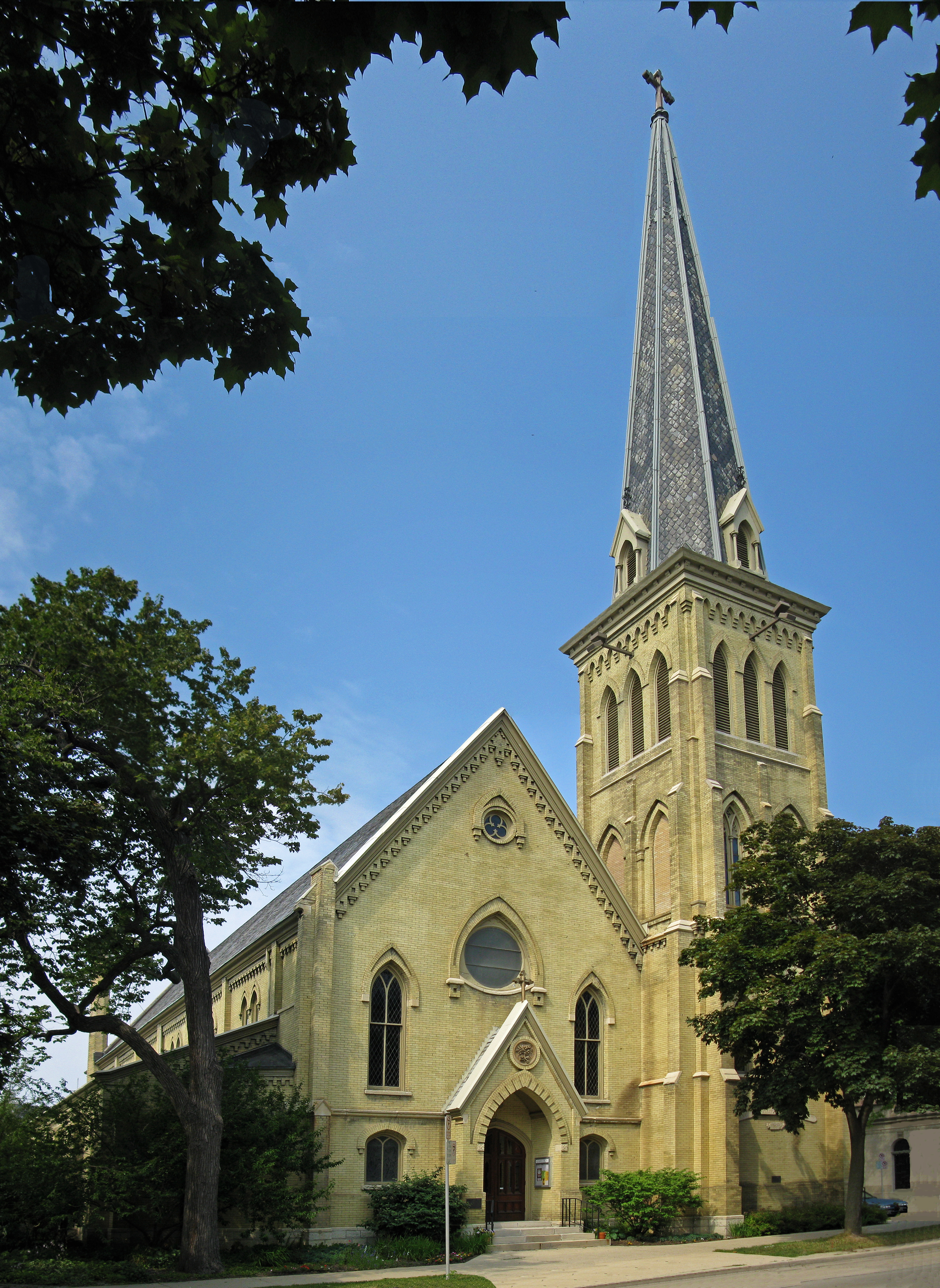

- Location within Wisconsin Location within the United States
- Location: 804-828 E. Juneau Ave; Milwaukee, Wisconsin
- Coordinates: 43.0460°N 87.9013°W
- Area: 1 acre (0.40 ha)
- Built: 1868 and other years
- Architect: E. Townsend Mix (Church); William D. Kimball (Guild Hall); Kirchhoff & Rose (Bishop's House); Kirchhoff & Rose (St. John’s Home)
- Architectural style: Gothic Revival (church)
- Website: www.ascathedral.org
- NRHP reference No.: 74000099
- Added to NRHP: December 27, 1974

All Saints’ Cathedral is a historic Episcopal cathedral in Milwaukee, Wisconsin. The cathedral as an ecclesiastical entity dates from 1867, when Jackson Kemper, the first bishop of Wisconsin, and his coadjutor William Armitage, were deeded the assets of a small church in downtown Milwaukee and renamed it "All Saints’ Pro-Cathedral." The cathedral moved to its present campus on Juneau Avenue in 1868, buying a wooden boarding house at one end of the block, then, in 1872, purchasing a church building at the other end when it came up for sale.

All Saints' was the "see," or seat, of the Bishop of Wisconsin until 1886; from then until 2023, it was the bishopric seat of the Diocese of Milwaukee. With the 2024 merger of the Milwaukee diocese with those of Fond du Lac and Eau Claire, All Saints' is again a historic cathedral parish within the Episcopal Diocese of Wisconsin.

== Historical and ecclesiastical context ==
The cathedral’s establishment was part of a general push among American bishops to create non-parochial seats from which they could administer and build up Episcopal dioceses. The late 1860s and early 70s saw the founding of several Episcopal cathedrals in the Midwest, including Trinity Episcopal Cathedral in Davenport, Iowa, and the Cathedral of Our Merciful Savior in Faribault, Minnesota. All Saints' differed from these, in that its early bishops purchased rather than built a church to serve as a cathedral. As one of the earliest expressions of "the Cathedral system" in the United States, All Saints' was the occasion, and even the scene, of notable controversy, adding to its significance as an historic site. The cathedral had a powerful advocate in the Reverend James DeKoven, a leading American proponent of the Oxford Movement, whose fitness to become the Bishop of Wisconsin was hotly debated in the church sanctuary in 1874.

== A bishop’s church ==
The dream of establishing the cathedral was borne of Bishop Kemper’s experience as the first missionary bishop of the Episcopal Church. Appointed in 1835 to grow the faith in what were then newly settled regions of American interior, Kemper planted mission churches across a broad swath of the Midwest. Just as his executive force had been instrumental in creating Nashotah House, a Wisconsin-based seminary educating well-trained clergy, so Kemper envisioned the need for “a new model of episcopacy” to promote consistency among the fledgling congregations, while hewing to an apostolic faith that was ancient and true. The bishop's determination to establish a hierarchical level of authority over the parishes was deeply objectionable to local clergy.

Nor was it easy to devise an institution that could function entirely independently of the parishes. To do so, the new cathedral would need capital, its own congregation, and a building. Bishop Kemper had long used Nashotah House as his personal base, but, given its remote location, it was ill suited to administering a diocese whose growth was concentrated in Milwaukee.

In 1866, the aging Kemper secured the appointment of a coadjutor (assisting) bishop, William E. Armitage, and placed all matters relating to the creating the new cathedral in his hands. By the following summer, the two had secured formal agreement from the existing Milwaukee parishes that the bishop’s “see” would be located there. Meanwhile, the two took charge of the local Trinity Church (founded in 1862) to serve as their base. Trinity was formed of two earlier churches: the Free Church of the Atonement (f. 1857) and the Church of St Paul (f. 1859). The latter, led by James Cook Richmond, was made of a large breakaway faction from St Paul's, the city's oldest parish. In 1867, Trinity deeded its assets to Bishop Armitage, thus supplying some of the capital needed for a cathedral church. By June that year, Trinity had been re-organized and re-named All Saints' Pro-Cathedral. The bishops had a seat, albeit a modest one, which they used while discerning where the cathedral would stand.

== A foothold on Juneau ==
In 1869, All Saints' secured a parcel and began construction at the northwest corner of what is now Juneau and Prospect Avenues (where Judge Jason Downer's mansion would stand). A stone foundation for the cathedral was finished and the cornerstone laid, but financing was scarce, and the project stalled. Instead, a wooden chapel with wings was built on the foundation, furnishing enough space for both church and school. Here Bishop Armitage preached on Sundays, and boys and girls were educated during the week. Following Bishop Kemper's death in 1870, it fell to Armitage to improve upon the cathedral's precarious situation.

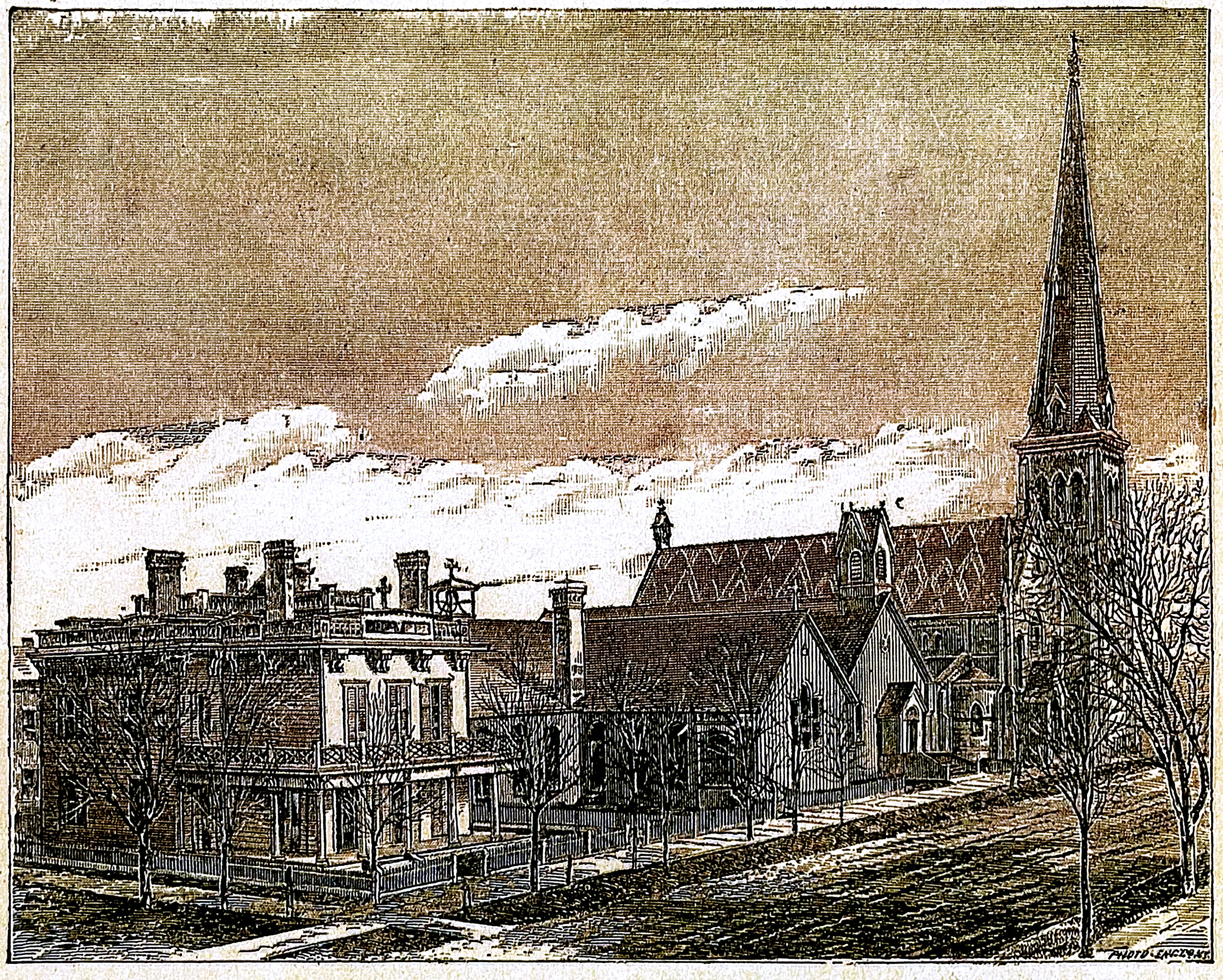
The All Saints' Cathedral complex initially consisted of these four buildings on the north side of Juneau Avenue between Cass and Marshall Streets.

== Evolution of the cathedral complex ==
In 1871, All Saints' sold its stake on Prospect and moved two blocks west, to the northeast corner of Juneau and Cass, purchasing a boarding house known as Townsend House and some adjacent land. All Saints' moved its wooden chapel and school building to this site, using Townsend House as a residence for the bishop and visiting clergy. Here, All Saints' began worshipping on September 3, 1871.

The move placed All Saints' adjacent to the Olivet Congregational Church, a towering brick edifice newly erected at the east end of the block. Designed by Edward Townsend Mix, one of the city’s leading architects, the Gothic Revival church, begun in 1868 and dedicated late the following year, cost about $66,000 to build. By 1872, however, the Olivet church was “burdened by dissension” and “beset by grave financial problems.” In June, All Saints' bought the church and its attendant property from the Congregationalists for $35,000. All Saints' began worshipping in its new sanctuary on November 1, 1873. It had acquired a cathedral church without having to move.

The following month, Bishop Armitage, 43, died while receiving medical treatment in New York City. Townsend House was renamed "Armitage House" in his memory. His sudden death set off a tumultuous period, as questions regarding the cathedral's direction, influence, and identity loomed.

== Architecture ==
The cathedral's design was derived from Medieval English parish churches of the fifteenth century. A massive square corner bell tower and tapered spire, rising about 190 feet, are its dominant feature. These are attached to a rectangular church whose walls are made of Milwaukee "cream-city brick", with limestone trim. The window tracery and carved oak entry doors partake of the perpendicular period of English Gothic architecture. Inside, a raised chancel with elaborately carved woodwork incorporates seats for the bishop and attending clergy, underscoring the cathedral's historic function within a hierarchical ecclesiastical polity. A simple throne that William White, America's first bishop, bequeathed to Jackson Kemper stands in the cathedral, symbolizing the unbroken line of apostolic succession connecting All Saints' to ancient Christianity.

== Interior features ==
The Olivet Church was initially plain. The nave was devoid of decoration, its altar simple. The leaded-glass windows were composed of uniform, diamond-shaped, pastel-colored panes. As an Episcopal house of worship, the interior underwent significant modifications. Between the 1870s and the Great Depression, many of the church's original windows were replaced with richly colored and detailed figurative panels depicting the saints. Most were designed and produced in England by Lavers, Barraud and Westlake of London. The large rondel window of Christ the King in the narthex came from the London firm of Heaton, Butler and Bayne. The stylistic consistency of the windows, with their jewel-like shades, is a distinguishing feature of the sanctuary.

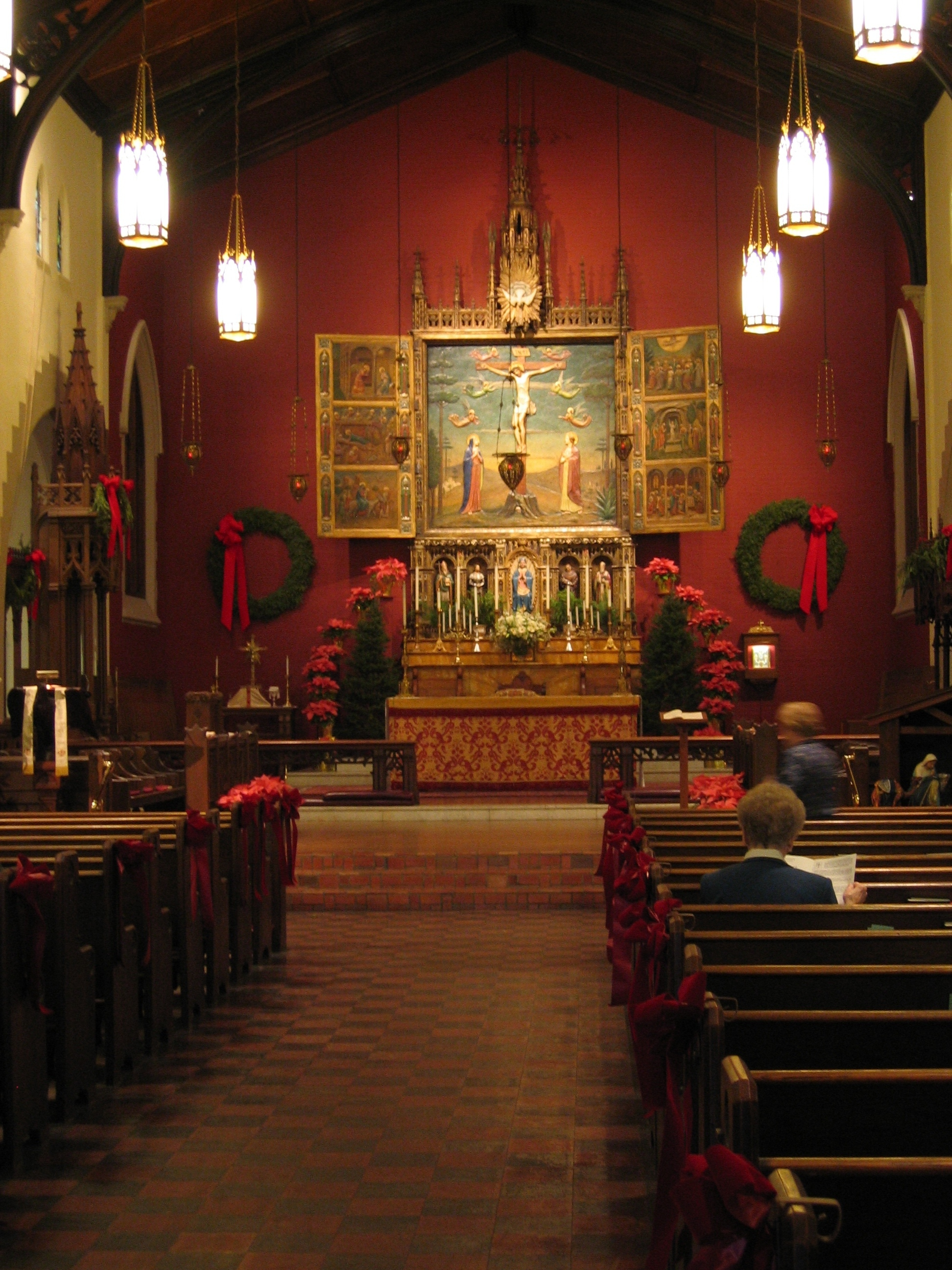
The high altar and triptych, added in 1922, were the work of Eugene W. Mason, Jr, an architect with Carrère and Hastings.

The chancel, too, was significantly altered, particularly in the decade after of World War I. During this period, an elaborate rood screen that had been installed in the late nineteenth-century was removed, giving the laity an unobstructed view of the central altar. In 1922, the high altar and triptych that serve as the liturgical center of the chancel were installed. They were given to the cathedral in memory of Samuel Augustus Field (1819-1911) and his wife Francis (d 1918). Eugene W. Mason, Jr. (1877-1964) an architect with the nationally prominent firm of Carrère and Hastings, handled the commission. Mason had developed a specialty in such work, designing a massive Baroque organ case for the home of Henry Clay Frick as well as the altar of St. Joseph's chapel in the Church of Saint Mary the Virgin in New York City. For All Saints', he created an altar of gold Siena marble on a white marble dias surmounted by a gilded triptych in the Italian Gothic style. The central panel depicts the Crucifixion; flanking it are side panels or "wings" depicting other Gospel scenes. The bronze door of the tabernacle bears a bas relief of the Lamb of God. In the niches of the predella connecting the altar and triptych are sculptural likenesses of Thomas á Becket, Joan of Arc, the Virgin Mary, Francis of Assisi, and Demetrius of Alexandria. Above the triptych is a carved crown molding whose central spire is emblazoned with the symbol of the Holy Spirit, a dove.

Though continually in use as a bishop's see and place of worship from the early 1870s, the modification of canonical law to comport with the bishops' intentions for All Saints' was not complete until the late 1880s. The Cathedral was formally consecrated in 1898, when it became debt-free.

== St. John's Home (1878-1979) ==
Meanwhile, in 1868, churchwomen from All Saints' and other local parishes established a small refuge for destitute women and children on Sycamore Street (now Michigan Avenue), which Bishop Kemper dedicated on June 17 of that year. Seed funding came from the children's Church School Easter Offering that the Milwaukee parishes collected. Among the four named founders were Cathedral parishioners who remained the backbone of the home's governance for generations.

The cathedral's role became concrete in 1878, when the first purpose-built Saint John's Home was erected on property leased from All Saints, on Cass Street, immediately adjacent to the cathedral's complex on Juneau Avenue. The cornerstone for a successor building was laid in 1923, in a ceremony that began symbolically on the cathedral's front steps, with clergy, board members, and residents processing around the corner together. The 1923 building was designed by Kirchhoff & Rose in the Colonial Revival/Georgian Revival style.

One the most significant figures in St John's history was Maria Louise Hinsdale (1850–1930), an All Saints' parishioner and daughter of one of St John's original founders, who served for 38 years as the home's treasurer and later the chair of its Board of Managers. The Dean of All Saints' regularly presided at the home's Christmas Eucharist, and Cathedral parishioners filled the volunteer ranks that sustained St. John's daily life throughout its Cass Street years.

When Saint John's relocated to its present location on Prospect Avenue in 1979, it carried with it four stained glass windows originally installed in its Cass Street chapel — memorials to women leaders of the home, including Cathedral parishioners — which remain in the Saint John's chapel today.

== The Guild Hall and Cathedral Institute (1891-Present) ==
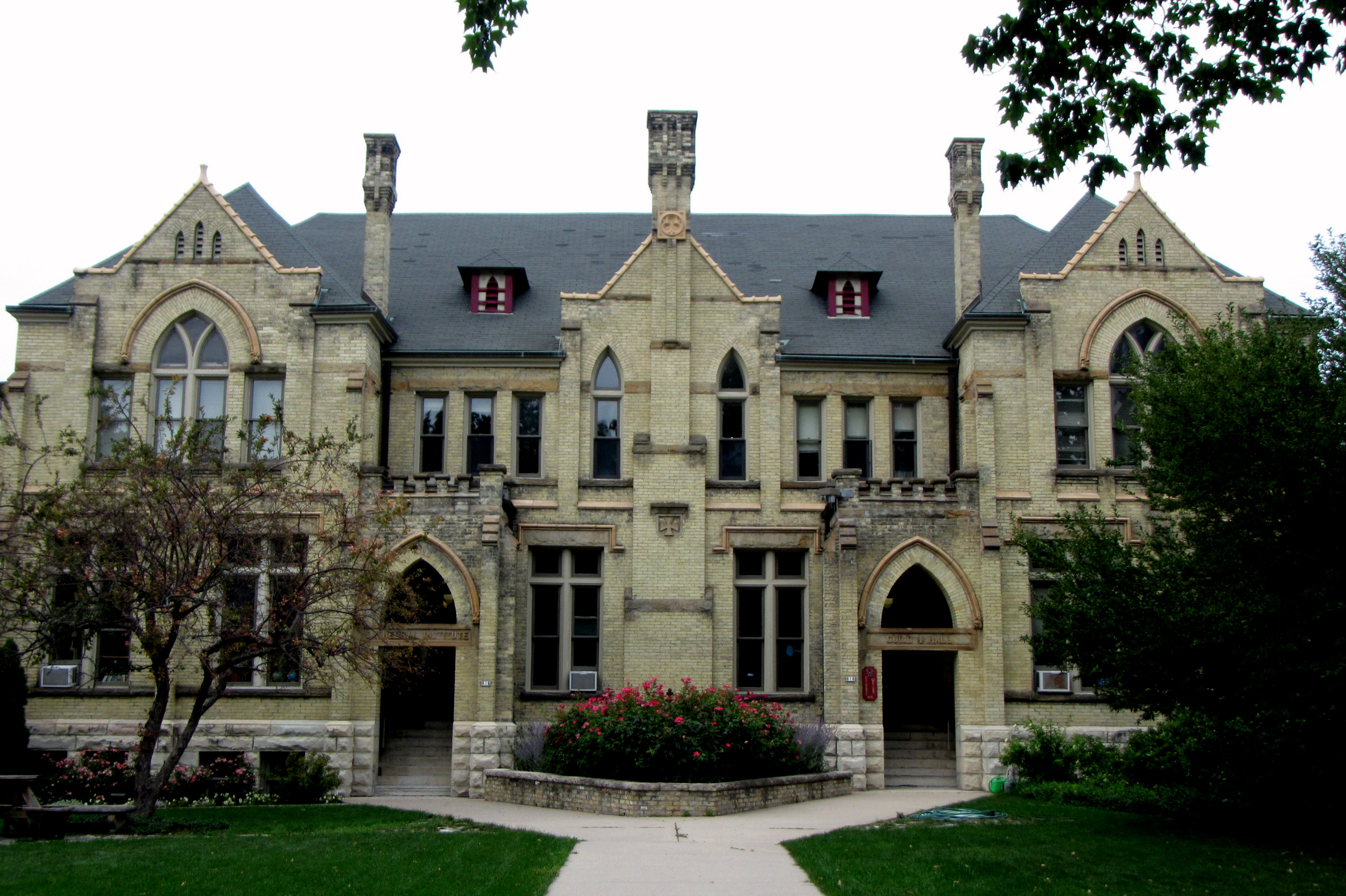
All Saints' Cathedral Institute and Guild Hall in 2017. They were added to the Cathedral in 1891.

The Cathedral became a more imposing and unified structure with the construction of a new Guild Hall and Cathedral Institute in 1891. The church's co-educational day school, now over 20 years old, was still operating in the old wooden building adjacent to Armitage House. Mrs Fitch J. Bosworth, a wealthy widow, contributed one half the expense of the new addition, funding the Cathedral Institute as a memorial to her daughter Emma, recently deceased at age 29. Wisconsin-born architect William Donaldson Kimball (1851-1907), active first in Minneapolis and later in Seattle, was hired to design the addition, which, being Victorian Gothic in style, harmonized well with the original church. When the addition was complete, the old guild hall and chapel were razed, creating the churchyard fronting Juneau Avenue.

The Guild Hall's most notable decorative feature is the 1891 "Bosworth Memorial Window" designed by Tiffany Studio. Mrs Bosworth commissioned the work to memorialize her two daughters, Emma and Gertrude, the latter of whom was little when she died. The work depicts Emma as a guardian angel, leading Gertrude heavenward. The window adorned the second-floor chapel of the Cathedral Institute.

== Nicholson House (1903-Present) ==
All Saints' fifth bishop, Isaac Lea Nicholson, brought yet more change to the cathedral commons. After guiding the church through the severe Panic of 1893, he set his sights on beautifying the Cathedral. Grounded in banking and wishing to extend the church's influence in society, Nicholson commissioned a number of stained glass windows for the Cathedral and subsidized construction of a new bishop's house. Under his leadership, the old clergy residence, Armitage House, was sawn in two and moved from its place on Juneau and Cass to a new location behind the Cathedral. There, it was completely remodeled and continued to provide housing for clergy and other visitors until the 1960s, when it was demolished to make way for parking.

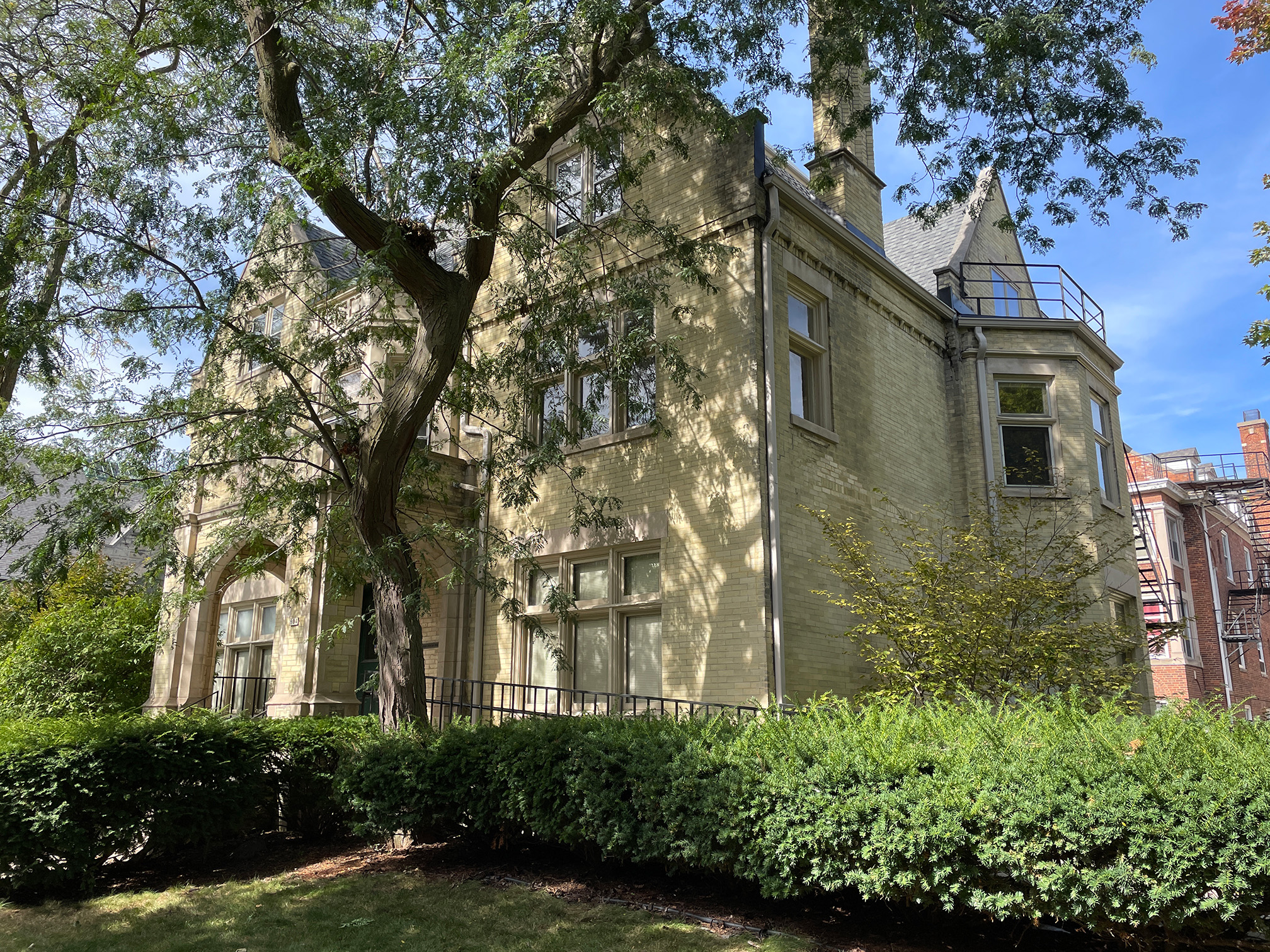
Nicholson House in 2025

The architectural firm of Kirchhoff & Rose designed the manse built on the vacant site. Lead architect Charles Kirchhoff, Jr., had achieved prominence as the Uihlein family's architect of choice. His portfolio included taverns, banks, theaters, and fashionable homes. With his partner, Thomas Leslie Rose, Kirchhoff designed a Jacobean-style mansion with 22 rooms, which became Nicholson's house in 1903. With its completion, the cathedral complex took on the U-shaped configuration that it retains in the twenty-first century.

Nicholson House served as the residence of the Bishop for three episcopates until 1950. From 1950 to 2024, it functioned as the diocesan offices of the Episcopal Diocese of Milwaukee. Following the reunification of the Diocese of Wisconsin, diocesan offices and personnel were dispersed throughout the state, with some staff relocating to the Guild Hall. The building has also housed offices for The Gathering, a Milwaukee-based nonprofit organization that provides meals, hospitality, and support services to individuals experiencing homelessness and poverty.

== Architectural significance ==
The cathedral complex was designated a Milwaukee City Landmark in 1973 and added to the National Register of Historic Places in 1974.

Formal assessments cite the cathedral proper as a fine example of E. Townsend Mix's work, along with a suite of other notable structures, including the Judge Jason Downer House (1874), the Immanuel Presbyterian Church (1875), and St Paul's Episcopal Church (1882), still standing nearby. Except for a 1908 modification that extended the north wall of the chancel by fourteen feet, the cathedral's exterior is substantially what it was in 1869. Mix's meticulous incorporation of centuries-old ecclesiastical forms into All Saints' make it an excellent example of Gothic Revival architecture. As a historic district, All Saints' campus presents a "harmonious ensemble of three stylistically related buildings in a pleasantly landscaped setting," the integrity of whose design has been well preserved.

== Bells ==
The Cathedral tower houses a swinging bronze bell that the Fulton Bell Foundry of Pittsburgh cast in 1867. The bell was installed when the Olivet Church was new. The "Tenor G" bell weighs 1,050 pounds, measures almost 40 inches in diameter at the mouth, and is usable today.

In the aftermath of the September 11 terror attacks, a set of five memorial bells was added to the Cathedral belfry. The bells were repurposed, having graced St John's Episcopal Church on the south side for nearly 100 years. Made in the 1860s by the Meneely Bell Foundry in West Troy, NY, the bells were set aside and stored in a barn in Dousman, Wisconsin, after St John's parish closed. Lee Manufacturing Company, a Milwaukee firm specializing in bell and clock towers, was engaged to hang "the Bells of Remembrance and Hope" in the Cathedral's tower. A dedication ceremony was held June 3, 2007. An automated system rings the stationary bells daily, tolling on the hour and quarter-hour from 9am to 9pm, remembering all victims of terror and expressing hope for peace.

Following a renovation in the 1950s, the steeple cross was mounted out-of-line with the facade, angling slightly towards Lake Michigan.

Today's church features a liturgy in the Anglo-Catholic tradition. With the closure of several of the city's earliest Episcopal parishes (such as St John's and St James), All Saints' has worshipped in one location longer than any other Episcopal congregation in Milwaukee.

The church reported 238 members in 2017 and 136 members in 2023. Plate and pledge income reported for the congregation in 2024 was $198,228, with average Sunday attendance (ASA) of 68 persons. This was a relative increase on ASA of 121 reported in 2015.

== Bishops of All Saints' ==
- Jackson Kemper (to 1870)
- William Edmond Armitage (1870-1873)
- Edward Randolph Welles (1874-1888)
- Cyrus Frederic Knight (1888-1891)
- Isaac Lea Nicholson (1891-1906)
- William Walter Webb (1906-1933)
- Benjamin Franklin Price Ivins (1933-1952)
- Donald H. V. Hallock (1952-1974)
- Charles Thomas Gaskell (1974-1985)
- Roger John White (1985- 2003)
- Steven Miller (2003-2020)
- Jeffrey Dean Lee (interim, 2021-2023)
- Matthew Alan Gunter (2024-present)

== Deans/Priests of All Saints' ==
- Erastus W. Spaulding (1872-1884)
- Charles L. Mallory (1885-1889)
- Gresham M. Williams (1885-1891)
- Vacant - Isaac Lea Nicholson — Dean Pro Tempore (1891-1897)
- Christopher S. Sargent (1897-1898)
- Vacant - Isaac Lea Nicholson — Dean Pro Tempore (1898-1906)
- Sheldon P. Delany (1907-1915)
- Charles N. Lathrop (1915-1920)
- Charles S. Hutchinson (1920-1930)
- Archibald I. Drake (1930-1934)
- Henry W. Roth (1934-1940)
- Malcolm dePui Maynard (1940-1959)
- Edward M. Jacobs (1959-1964)
- Robert G. Caroom (1964-1968)
- Robert F. Stub (1968-1979)
- James W. Leech (1979-1983)
- Fredrick F. Pontus (1984-1989)
- Patrick M. Matheingue (1990-1997)
- Dr. M. Fred Himmerich (interim, 1997-1998)
- George E. Hillmon (1998-2007)
- Warren H. Raasch (2008-2009)
- Kevin C. Carroll (2010-2025)
- Dr. John T. Allen (interim, 2025-2026)
- Micah Cronin (2026-Present); as dean here, Cronin was the first openly transgender cathedral dean in the Episcopal Church of the United States.

== See also ==
- List of the Episcopal cathedrals of the United States
- List of cathedrals in the United States
