= Russell Jacobus =

American bishop

The Right Reverend Russell Edward Jacobus M.Div.
- Bishop of Fond du Lac
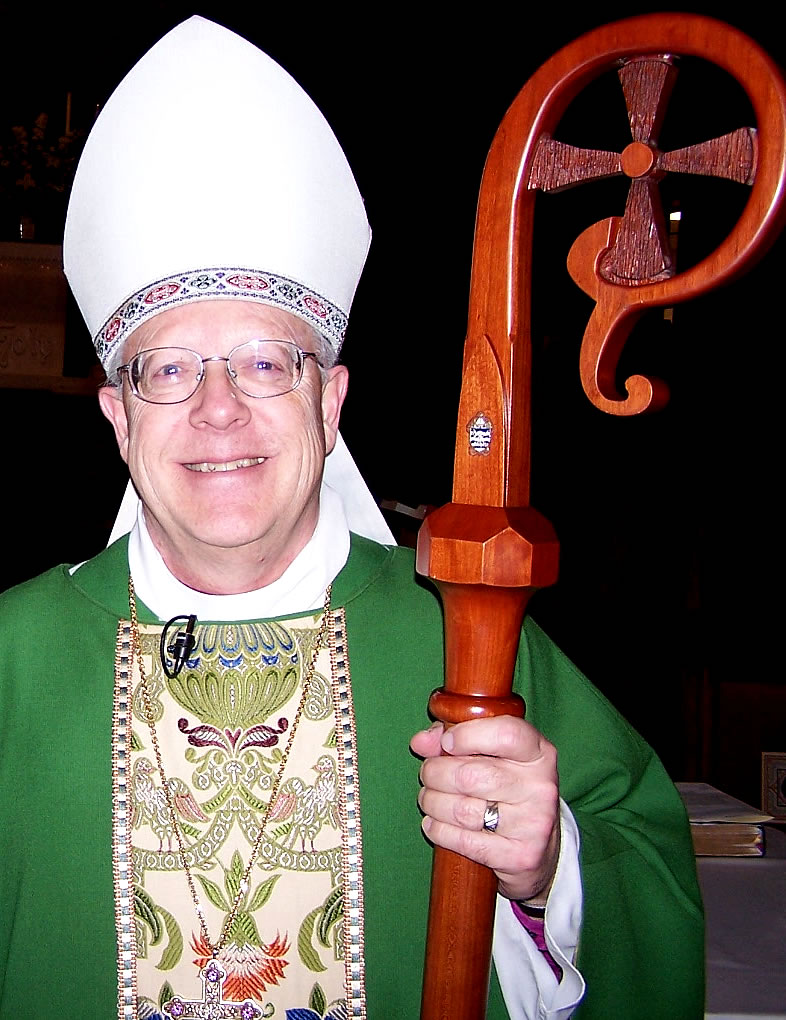
- Church: Episcopal Church
- Diocese: Fond du Lac
- Elected: January 8, 1994
- In office: 1994–2013
- Predecessor: William L. Stevens
- Successor: Matthew Alan Gunter

Orders
- Ordination: August 1970 by Donald H. V. Hallock
- Consecration: May 24, 1994 by Edmond L. Browning

Personal details
- Born: September 27, 1944 (age 82) Milwaukee, Wisconsin, United States
- Died: October 24, 2023 (aged 79) Fond du Lac, Wisconsin, United States
- Buried: St. Paul's Cathedral (Fond du Lac, Wisconsin)
- Denomination: Anglican
- Parents: Lester & Sarah Jacobus
- Spouse: Jerrie
- Children: 3
- Education: University of Wisconsin–Milwaukee; Nashotah House

Russell Edward Jacobus (September 27, 1944 - October 24, 2023) was the seventh Bishop of the Diocese of Fond du Lac in The Episcopal Church. Jacobus was consecrated as bishop on 24 May 1994. Prior to becoming bishop, he served as Rector of St. Matthias Episcopal Church in Waukesha, Wisconsin. At the close of Diocesan convention on October 20, 2012, he announced his intention to retire one year hence, on October 31, 2013.

== Background ==
Jacobus was born in Milwaukee, Wisconsin on 27 September 1944, the youngest of three sons of Lester and Sarah Jacobus. He received his Bachelor of Arts from the University of Wisconsin–Milwaukee in 1967 and his Master of Divinity from Nashotah House Seminary in 1970. Jacobus was ordained Deacon in February 1970 and to the Priesthood in August 1970 by Donald Hathaway Valentine Hallock, VIII Bishop of Milwaukee. Jacobus married Jerrie Ellen Evrard on 25 May 1968; they are the parents of three adult children: Penny, Elizabeth, and David.

He is currently a member of Communion Partners, an Episcopalian group which opposed the 77th General Episcopal Convention's decision to authorize the blessing of same-sex marriages in 2012. The measure to allow the blessing of same-sex unions won by a 111–41 vote with 3 abstentions.

== Priesthood ==
Jacobus was the Curate at Trinity Church, Wauwatosa, Wisconsin until being called to be Vicar of Grace-Holy Innocents Parish in Hartland, Wisconsin in 1974. One year later, Grace-Holy Innocents became a Parish (changing its name to St. Anskar's), and Jacobus was called as their first Rector, In 1980, he was called by St. Matthias Church, Waukesha, Wisconsin, to be their Rector. He served in this capacity until being elected Bishop.

During his years of ministry, Jacobus has served as member or chair of many Committees and Commissions, both ecclesiastical and secular. These include Standing Committees, Commissions on Ministry, Departments of Congregational Development, as well as the City of Waukesha Equal Opportunity Commission, the Board of the UP Connection, and the Board of the Visiting Nurses Association. He has always been involved in and supportive of Ecumenical ventures, serving on the Anglican/Roman Catholic Dialogue Committee, and assisting the Churches of Greater Waukesha to develop programs of outreach to the needy. In addition, Jacobus was involved in spiritual renewal movements, serving as Spiritual Director for the Cursillo Movement in the Episcopal Diocese of Milwaukee. He was a clergy Deputy to General Convention from the Diocese of Milwaukee for four consecutive Conventions beginning in 1982.

== Election as bishop ==
Jacobus was consecrated as bishop on 24 May 1994 in the Memorial Chapel at Lawrence University, Appleton, Wisconsin. Edmond L. Browning was the Chief Consecrator. The co-consecrators were William Stevens, VI Bishop of Fond du Lac; Roger J. White, X Bishop of Milwaukee; William Wantland, IV Bishop of Eau Claire; William Hampton Brady, V Bishop of Fond du Lac; Charles Thomas Gaskell, IX Bishop of Milwaukee; and Stanley Atkins, III Bishop of Eau Claire. William Wiedrich, Suffragan Bishop of Chicago, was the preacher.

== See also ==
- List of Succession of Bishops for the Episcopal Church, USA

Episcopal Church (USA) titles
Preceded by William L. Stevens	7th Bishop of Fond du Lac; 24 May 1994–31 October 2013	Succeeded by Matthew Alan Gunter
