= Episcopal Diocese of Wisconsin =

Episcopal Church diocese in the US

Coordinates: 43°00′N 89°30′W

Diocese of Wisconsin

Location
- Country: United States
- Ecclesiastical province: Province V

Statistics
- Congregations: 98 (2024)
- Members: 10,134 (2025)

Information
- Denomination: Episcopal Church
- Established: June 24, 1847
- Cathedral: All Saints Cathedral (Milwaukee); St. Paul's Cathedral, Fond du Lac; Christ Church Cathedral, Eau Claire

Current leadership
- Bishop: Matthew A. Gunter

Map
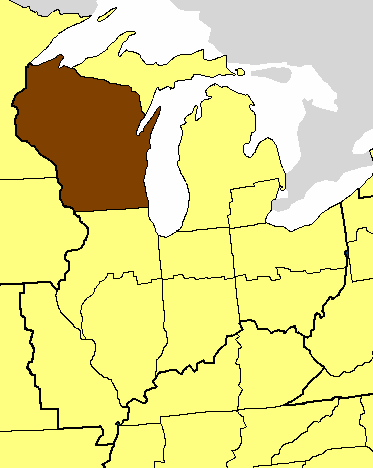
- Location of the Episcopal Diocese of Wisconsin

Website
- diowis.org

The Episcopal Diocese of Wisconsin, originally the Diocese of Wisconsin and later the Diocese of Milwaukee, is the diocese of the Episcopal Church in the United States of America located in the state of Wisconsin. It is in Province V (for the Midwest region). The diocese was originally formed in 1847, but was re-established in 2024 by the merger of the Episcopal Diocese of Eau Claire and the Episcopal Diocese of Fond du Lac into the Diocese of Milwaukee.

== Statistics ==
The 98 congregations of the diocese reported Average Sunday Attendance (ASA) of 3,997 persons and $13,131,291 of plate and pledge income in 2024. Combined 2023 membership of the predecessor dioceses was 10,535 persons, a decrease from 15,902 in 2015.

== Cathedrals ==
The reunited diocese retained the three historic cathedrals of the former Dioceses of Milwaukee, Eau Claire, and Fond du Lac.

== History ==
The diocese was formed after Jackson Kemper was named the Episcopal Church's first missionary bishop and oversaw the church's mission to the Northwest Territories from 1835 to 1859. He became provisional bishop of Wisconsin from 1847 to 1854 and first bishop of the Diocese of Wisconsin from 1854 to 1870.

In 1875, the Diocese of Fond du Lac was created to serve the northeastern 26 counties of the state. The Diocese of Eau Claire, was carved out of the diocese in 1928 for the counties in the northwestern part of Wisconsin. The Diocese of Wisconsin became the Diocese of Milwaukee in 1886.

In 2021, it was announced that the dioceses of Fond du Lac, Eau Claire, and Milwaukee would contemplate entering an agreement of greater collaboration. In October 2021, it was announced that the three dioceses would actively pursue reuniting as one diocese in Wisconsin. On May 4, 2024, the three dioceses voted to approve reunion as the Diocese of Wisconsin. The merger agreement received approval at the General Convention in June 2024.

== List of bishops ==
=== Bishops of Wisconsin (1847-1888) ===
1. Jackson Kemper (1859–1870)
2. William Edmond Armitage (1870–1873)
3. Edward Randolph Welles (1874–1888)

=== Bishops of Milwaukee (1888-2024) ===
1. Cyrus Frederick Knight (1889–1891)
2. Isaac Lea Nicholson (1891–1906)
3. William Walter Webb (1906–1933)
4. Benjamin Franklin Price Ivins (1933–1952)
5. Donald Hathaway Valentine Hallock (1953–1973)
6. Charles Thomas Gaskell (1974–1985)
7. Roger J. White (1985–2003)
8. Steven Andrew Miller (2003–2020)
  *Jeffrey D. Lee (2021-2023, bishop provisional)

=== Bishops of Fond du Lac ===
1. John Henry Hobart Brown (1875–1888)
2. Charles Chapman Grafton (1889–1912)
  * Reginald Heber Weller, Coadjutor Bishop (consecrated 1900)
3. Reginald Heber Weller (1912–1933)
  * Harwood Sturtevant, Coadjutor Bishop (consecrated 1929)
4. Harwood Sturtevant (1933–1956)
  * William Hampton Brady, Coadjutor Bishop (consecrated 1953)
5. William Hampton Brady (1956–1980)
6. William Louis Stevens (1980–1994)
7. Russell Edward Jacobus (1994–2013)
8. Matthew Alan Gunter (2014–2024)

=== Bishops of Eau Claire ===
1. Frank Elmer Wilson, First Bishop of Eau Claire, (1929–1944)
2. William Wallace Horstick, Second Bishop of Eau Claire, (June 29, 1944 - Resigned Dec 31, 1969)
3. Stanley Hamilton Atkins, Third Bishop of Eau Claire, (1970–1980)
4. William C. Wantland, Fourth Bishop of Eau Claire, (1980–1999)
5. Keith B. Whitmore, Fifth Bishop of Eau Claire, (1999–2008)
  * Edwin M. Leidel, Jr., Bishop Provisional of Eau Claire, (2010–2013)
6. William Jay Lambert III, Sixth Bishop (2013–2020)
  *Matthew A. Gunter (2020-2024, bishop provisional)

=== Bishops of Wisconsin (2024-present) ===
9. Matthew A. Gunter (2024–Present)

== Education ==
Nashotah House, in Nashotah, which is a seminary for the Episcopal Church, and St. John's Northwestern Military Academy in Delafield, Wisconsin, a private Episcopal military academy, are also located in the Diocese of Wisconsin.

Cadle Mission and Racine College were also located in the diocese.
