= Episcopal Diocese of Eau Claire =

Diocese of the Episcopal Church in the United States

Coordinates: 45°20′N 91°50′W

Diocese of Eau Claire

Location
- Country: United States
- Territory: Northwestern third of Wisconsin
- Ecclesiastical province: Province V

Statistics
- Congregations: 19 (2022)
- Members: 970 (2022)

Information
- Denomination: Episcopal Church
- Established: November 21, 1928
- Dissolved: June 28, 2024
- Cathedral: Christ Church Cathedral
- Language: English

Map
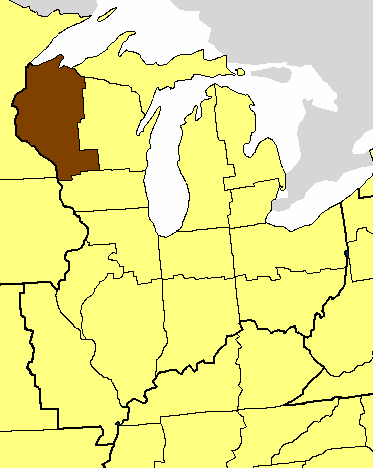
- Location of the Diocese of Eau Claire

Website
- episcopaldioceseofeauclaire.com

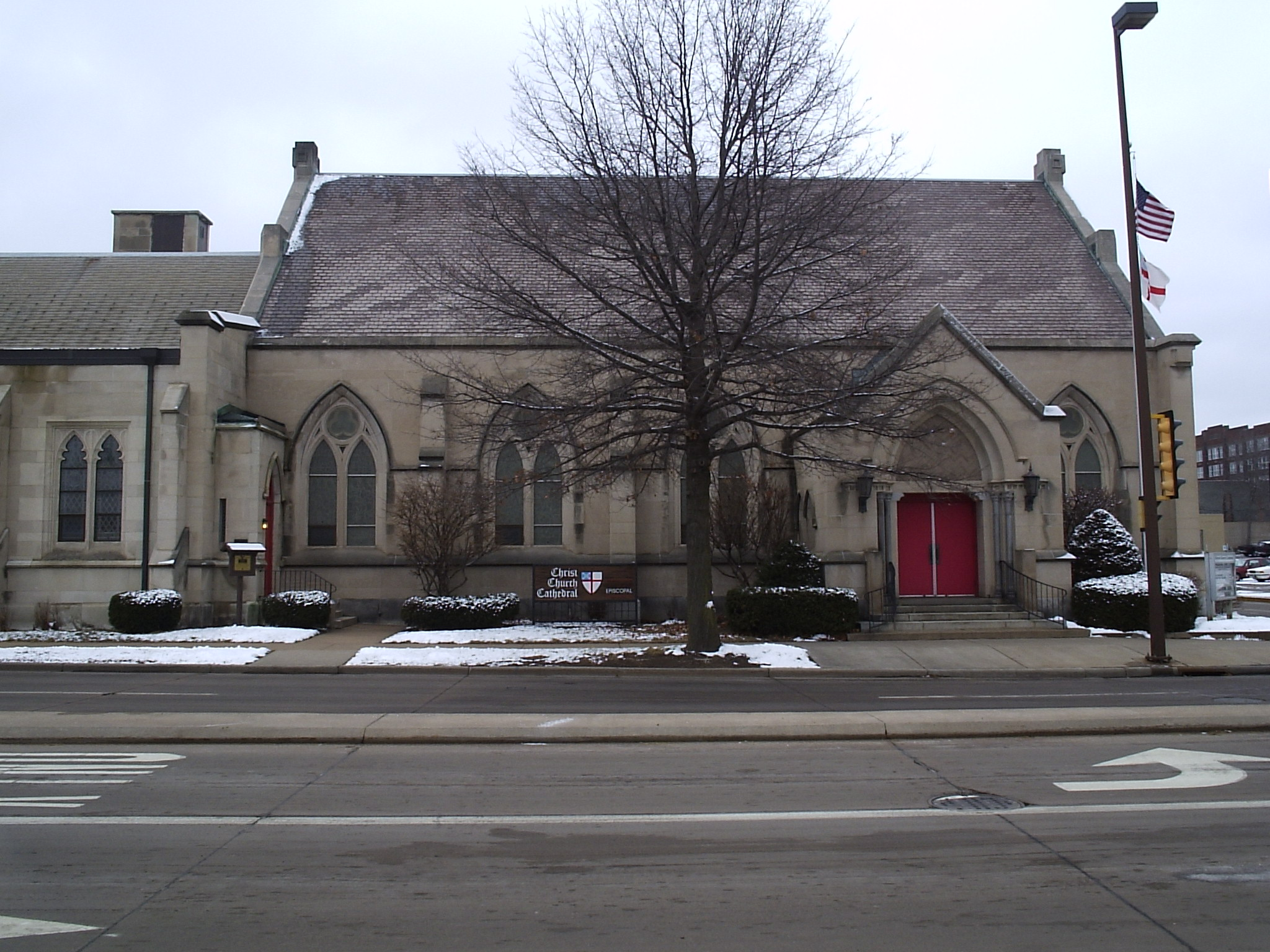
Christ Church Cathedral in Eau Claire, from the opposite side of Lake Street

The Episcopal Diocese of Eau Claire was a diocese of the Episcopal Church in the United States of America encompassing the northwestern third of Wisconsin. It was part of Province 5 (the upper Midwest). The diocese comprised 20 interdependent congregations, mostly small and rural. The see and diocesan offices were in Eau Claire, Wisconsin, with Christ Church Cathedral as the mother church. Christ Church in La Crosse was the largest church in the diocese.

In 2024, the General Convention of the Episcopal Church approved the reunion of the dioceses of Eau Claire, Milwaukee, and Fond du Lac into the new Episcopal Diocese of Wisconsin.

== History ==
The roots of the Diocese of Eau Claire began in 1822 when the Oneida Indians, removing from New York state, settled near Green Bay. The first annual council of the Diocese of Wisconsin met in Milwaukee in 1847. In 1874, the General Convention of the Episcopal Church erected the Diocese of Fond du Lac from the Fond du Lac Deanery of the Diocese of Wisconsin. The remaining counties continued as the Diocese of Wisconsin until 1888, when it was renamed the Diocese of Milwaukee. Growth, time, and distance led to the erection of a third Wisconsin diocese. The Diocese of Eau Claire was created from counties of both the Diocese of Milwaukee and Diocese of Fond du Lac in 1928.

On October 22, 2011, the Diocese of Fond du Lac and the Diocese of Eau Claire voted to "junction" into one diocese. However, Russell Jacobus, Bishop of Fond du Lac, withheld consent because of the closeness and irregularities of the vote.

In 2021 it was announced that the diocese of Eau Claire, Fond du Lac, and Milwaukee would contemplate entering an agreement of greater collaboration. With around 1,200 baptized members and most congregations having fewer than 80 members, Eau Claire is one of the Episcopal Church's smallest dioceses and the sustainability of its continued existence has been questioned. In October 2021 it was announced that the three diocese would be actively pursuing reuniting as one diocese in Wisconsin. On May 4, 2024, the three dioceses voted to approve reunion as the Diocese of Wisconsin. The merger agreement received approval at General Convention in June 2024.

== Bishops ==
On August 28, 2010, a special convention in the diocese elected Edwin M. Leidel, Jr. to be the bishop provisional. The diocese had been without a bishop since April 2008.

On May 1, 2012 the diocesan bishop search committee announced it was accepting applications for the sixth Bishop of the Diocese of Eau Claire.

On November 10, 2012, William Jay Lambert III was elected as the next bishop of the Episcopal Diocese of Eau Claire.

On March 16, 2013, Katharine Jefferts Schori presided over the consecration of William Jay Lambert III at Christ Church Cathedral, Eau Claire, Wisconsin, as the Sixth Bishop of the diocese. After Lambert's retirement on December 1, 2020, Matthew Alan Gunter served as bishop provisional.

Bishops who served the Diocese of Wisconsin:

1. Jackson Kemper (1847–1870)
2. William Edmond Armitage (1870–1873)
3. Edward Randolph Welles (1874–1888)

Bishops who served the Diocese of Milwaukee, prior to creation of the Diocese of Eau Claire:

1. Cyrus Frederick Knight (1889-1891)
2. Isaac Lea Nicholson (1891-1906)
3. William Walter Webb (1906-1933)

Bishops who served the Diocese of Eau Claire:

1. Frank Elmer Wilson, First Bishop of Eau Claire, (1929-1944)
2. William Wallace Horstick, Second Bishop of Eau Claire, (June 29, 1944 - Resigned Dec 31, 1969)
3. Stanley Hamilton Atkins, Third Bishop of Eau Claire, (1970-1980)
4. William C. Wantland, Fourth Bishop of Eau Claire, (1980-1999)
5. Keith B. Whitmore, Fifth Bishop of Eau Claire, (1999-2008)
  * Edwin M. Leidel, Jr., Bishop Provisional of Eau Claire, (2010-2013)
6. William Jay Lambert III, Sixth Bishop (elected November 10, 2012, consecrated March 16, 2013 - December 1, 2020)
  *Matthew A. Gunter (2020-2024, provisional)
