= Charles Hutchinson =

Charles Hutchinson may refer to:

- Charles Hutchinson (Nottingham MP) (1636–1695), English politician, member of parliament (MP) for Nottingham
- Charles Frederick Hutchinson (1850–1907), English physician and MP for Rye
- Charles L. Hutchinson (1854–1924), Chicago business leader and philanthropist
- Charles Scrope Hutchinson (1826–1912), British railway inspector
- Charles S. Hutchinson (1871–1942), American Anglo-Catholic priest

== See also ==
- Charles Hutchison (disambiguation)
