= William W. Horstick =

American bishop

The Right Reverend William Wallace Horstick D.D., D.C.L.
- Bishop of Eau Claire
- Church: Episcopal Church
- Diocese: Eau Claire
- Elected: April 18, 1944
- In office: 1944–1969
- Predecessor: Frank E. Wilson
- Successor: Stanley Atkins

Orders
- Ordination: June 1929 by Reginald Heber Weller
- Consecration: June 29, 1944 by Henry St. George Tucker

Personal details
- Born: January 31, 1902 Harrisburg, Pennsylvania, United States
- Died: May 27, 1973 (aged 71) Oconomowoc, Wisconsin, United States
- Denomination: Anglican
- Parents: John Franklin Horstick & Emma Machen
- Spouse: Joan E. Piersen
- Children: 4
- Education: Nashotah House

William Wallace Horstick (January 31, 1902 – May 27, 1973) was an American prelate of the Episcopal Church who served as the second Bishop of Eau Claire from 1944 till 1969.

== Biography ==
Horstick was born in Harrisburg, Pennsylvania, on January 31, 1902, the son of John Franklin Horstick, Sr. and Emma Machen Horstick. He graduated with a Bachelor of Divinity from Nashotah House Theological Seminary in 1928, and received two honorary degrees from the same institution: Doctor of Divinity (1944) and Doctor of Canon Law (1969).

In December 1928, Horstick was ordained deacon by Bishop Benjamin F. P. Ivins of Milwaukee, and priest in June 1929 by Bishop Reginald Heber Weller of Fond du Lac. He became curate at the Church of the Redeemer in Chicago, while in 1931 he became rector of Trinity Church in Aurora, Illinois. On July 28, 1937, he was married Joan E. Piersen and together they had four children.

He was elected second Bishop of the Episcopal Diocese of Eau Claire on April 18, 1944, and consecrated on June 29, 1944, in Christ Church Cathedral, Eau Claire. He retired on December 31, 1969, and was succeeded by Stanley Hamilton Atkins.
