= Diocese of Milwaukee =

Diocese of Milwaukee may refer to:

- Roman Catholic Archdiocese of Milwaukee
- Episcopal Diocese of Milwaukee
