= Seminole High School (Oklahoma) =

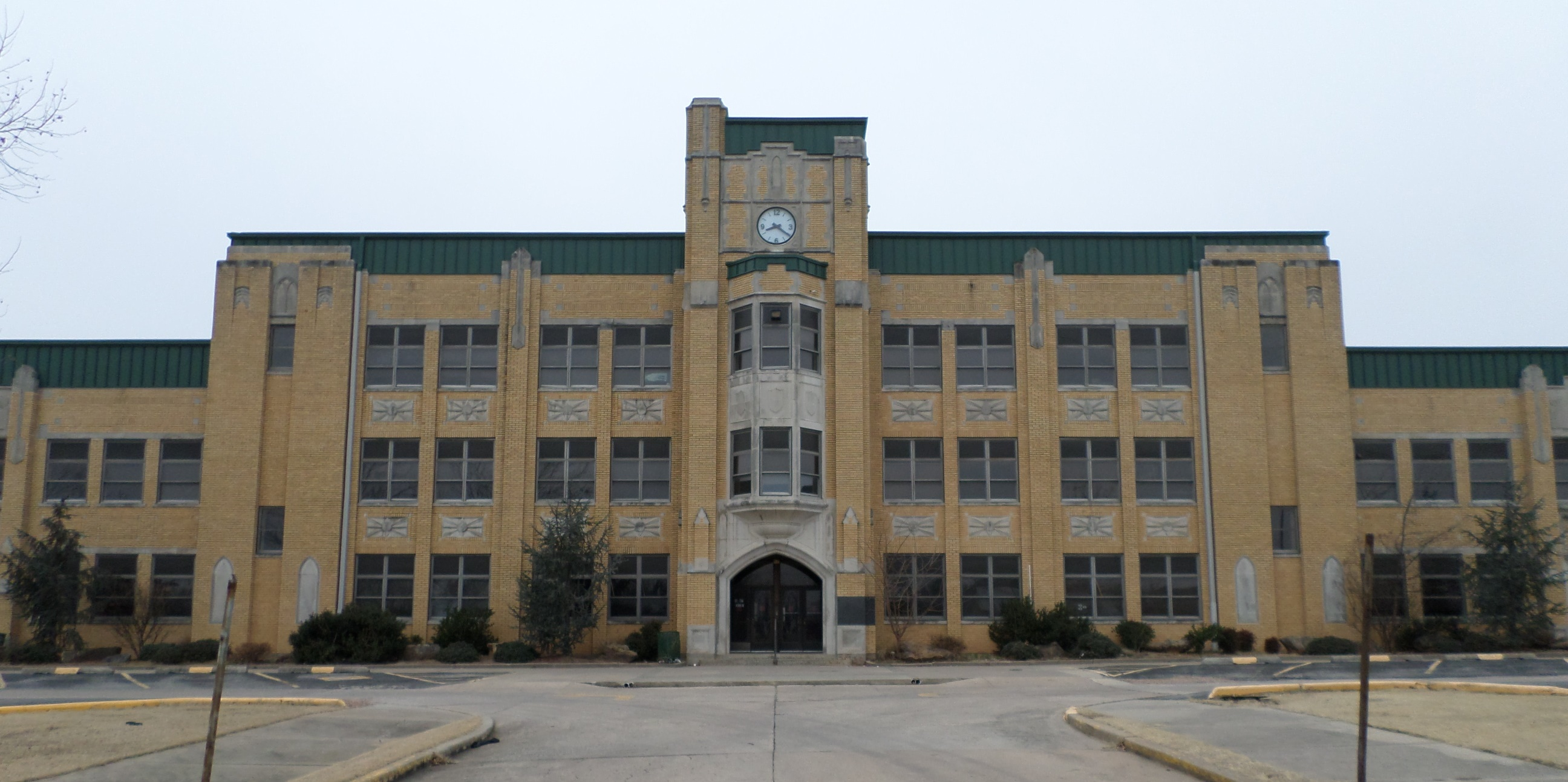
- The former Seminole High School was built in 1930 and used until 2015.

Location
- 2703 Highway 9 West; Seminole, Oklahoma 74868; 35°14′06″N 96°38′58″W

Information
- Motto: Tradition never graduates
- Opened: 1902
- Superintendent: Bob Gragg
- Principal: David Dean
- Teaching staff: 28.85 (FTE)
- Grades: 9-12
- Enrollment: 421 (2023-2024)
- Student to teacher ratio: 14.59
- Colors: Green and white
- Team name: Chieftains
- Newspaper: The Big Chieftain
- Website: hs.sps.k12.ok.us

Seminole High School is a public high school located in Seminole, Oklahoma, operated by Seminole Public Schools.

As of the 2006–07 school year, the school had an enrollment of 482 students and 30.6 classroom teachers (on a FTE basis), for a student–teacher ratio of 15.8.

In 2015, students were moved out of the high school due to safety concerns with the building that was originally built in 1930. In 2017, Seminole voters approved construction of a brand new high school to be built on the northwest side of the city. In January 2020, at the beginning of the second semester of the 2019–2020 school year, the students were moved out of the temporary building with the new facility having been completed.

== Notable alumni ==
- Ronald Chase, artist, film maker, opera designer
- Edmond Harjo (Seminole, 1917–2014), Seminole Nation of Oklahoma Code Talker during World War II, recipient of the Congressional Gold Medal
- Troy Smith (1922-2009), founder of Sonic Drive-In
- Stewart Stover, former professional football player
- Heather Wahlquist, actress
- William C. Wantland, Bishop of the Episcopal Diocese of Eau Claire
- Mary Jo Watson (Seminole) art historian and director emeritus of the University of Oklahoma's Art and Art History
- Don E. Schultz, considered the "father of Integrated Marketing Communications"
