= Frank E. Wilson =

Frank E. Wilson may refer to:

- Frank E. Wilson (politician) (1857–1935), U.S. Representative from New York
- Frank E. Wilson (bishop) (1885–1944), first Bishop of the Episcopal Diocese of Eau Claire
