= Charles Gaskell =

Charles Gaskell may refer to:

- Charles T. Gaskell (1920–2000), bishop of the Episcopal Diocese of Milwaukee
- Charles Milnes Gaskell (1842–1919), English lawyer and politician
