= Edward Randolph Welles =

Edward Randolph Welles may refer to:

- Edward R. Welles (1830–1888), bishop of the Episcopal Diocese of Milwaukee
- Edward R. Welles II (1907–1991), bishop of the Episcopal Diocese of West Missouri
