= Stanley Atkins =

Episcopal bishop

The Right Reverend Stanley Hamilton Atkins D.D.
- Bishop of Eau Claire
- Church: Episcopal Church
- Diocese: Eau Claire
- Elected: 1969
- In office: 1970–1980
- Predecessor: William W. Horstick
- Successor: William C. Wantland
- Previous post: Coadjutor Bishop of Eau Claire (1969-1970)

Orders
- Ordination: December 17, 1939 by Alwyn Williams
- Consecration: August 2, 1969 by William W. Horstick

Personal details
- Born: March 8, 1912 Newcastle upon Tyne, England
- Died: January 6, 1996 (aged 83) Oconomowoc, Wisconsin, United States
- Denomination: Anglican
- Parents: George Thomas Atkins & Ethel Williams
- Spouse: Mildred Maureen March
- Children: 3
- Education: King's College London

Stanley Hamilton Atkins (March 8, 1912 – January 6, 1996) was an English prelate of the Episcopal Church, who served as the third Bishop of Eau Claire, from 1970 till 1980.

== Early life and education ==
Atkins was born in Newcastle upon Tyne, England, on March 8, 1912, the son of George Thomas Atkins and Ethel Williams. He studied at King's College London and graduated in 1938. He was awarded a Doctor of Divinity from Nashotah House in 1969.

== Ordained ministry ==
Atkins was ordained deacon on December 18, 1938, and priest on December 17, 1939, and served in the Diocese of Durham. He married Mildred Maureen March on May 5, 1942, and together had three children. In 1949, he left for Canada and served in the Diocese of Rupert's Land in the Anglican Church of Canada. In 1955, he moved to the United States to become rector of St Paul's Church in Hudson, Wisconsin and vicar of St Thomas' Church in New Richmond, Wisconsin. Atkins then became Archdeacon of Milwaukee, in the Episcopal Diocese of Milwaukee, serving from 1962 till 1969.

== Bishop ==
In 1969, Atkins was elected Coadjutor Bishop of Eau Claire, and was consecrated on August 2, 1969, in Christ Church Cathedral, Eau Claire. He succeeded as diocesan bishop on January 1, 1970. He was a leader in the movement opposing women's ordination in the Episcopal Church USA, and served as a trustee of Nashotah House Theological Seminary as well as The Living Church magazine. Atkins retired as diocesan bishop in 1980, and was succeeded by William C. Wantland.
