= Matthew A. Gunter =

The Right Reverend Matthew Alan Gunter
- Bishop of Wisconsin
- Church: Episcopal Church
- Diocese: Wisconsin
- Elected: October 19, 2013
- In office: 2014–present
- Predecessor: Russell Jacobus
- Other post: Bishop of Fond du Lac

Orders
- Ordination: December 21, 1996 by Frank Griswold
- Consecration: April 26, 2014 by Katharine Jefferts Schori

Personal details
- Born: December 20, 1957 (age 68) Indiana
- Denomination: Episcopal Church
- Spouse: Leslie Gunter (m. 1981)
- Children: 3
- Education: Indiana University Bloomington; Virginia Theological Seminary

Matthew Alan Gunter (born December 20, 1957) is the ninth and current bishop of the Episcopal Diocese of Wisconsin in The Episcopal Church. He assumed this post upon the 2024 merger of the Dioceses of Eau Claire and Fond du Lac with the Diocese of Milwaukee. From 2014 to 2024, he was the diocesan bishop of Fond du Lac. Prior to becoming bishop, he served as Rector of St. Barnabas Episcopal Church in Glen Ellyn, Illinois, and as Assistant Rector of St. David Church, Glenview, Illinois.

== Early life and education ==
Gunter was raised on a farm in northern Indiana and worked in the family-run sawmill. He received his bachelor's degree in history from Indiana University Bloomington. He then taught and worked in education. He married Leslie in 1981. After college, he attended Gordon-Conwell Seminary for a time then moved to California, where he taught high school. While there he was a member of a Lutheran church and volunteered as the youth leader until he joined an Episcopal church and was confirmed in 1990. In 1993, he attended Virginia Theological Seminary, receiving his degree in 1996.

== Priesthood ==
Gunter was ordained deacon on June 8, 1996, by Bishop David Mercer Schofield and a priest on December 21, 1996, by Bishop Frank Griswold. In addition to his pastoral work at the parish level, Gunter served as Spiritual Advisor, Chicago Episcopal Cursillo; Member of Diocese of Chicago Commission on Global Ministry; Dean, Aurora Deanery; Deputy to three General Conventions; Chaplain of the 75th General Convention; Member of Diocesan Windsor Report Task Force; Led four-member official delegation from Diocese of Chicago to Diocese of Renk, Sudan; Board of Directors – Ekklesia Project (2003–2006); Chair of Diocesan Annual Campaign; Spiritual Director on several Cursillo weekends; Spiritual Director on two Happening weekends and hand-to-hand volunteer for San Joaquin County AIDS Foundation.

== Election as Bishop ==
Gunter was elected bishop of the Diocese of Fond du Lac on October 19, 2013. Following a successful consent process, he was consecrated bishop on April 26, 2014, by Presiding Bishop Katharine Jefferts Schori in Appleton, Wisconsin.

== See also ==
- List of Episcopal bishops of the United States
- Historical list of the Episcopal bishops of the United States

Episcopal Church (USA) titles
Preceded by Russell Jacobus	8th Bishop of Fond du Lac; 2014–2024	Succeeded by Position abolished
Preceded by Steven Miller as Bishop of Milwaukee	9th Bishop of Wisconsin; Since 2024	Incumbent
