= Cyrus F. Knight =

American bishop

The Right Reverend Cyrus Frederick Knight
- Bishop of Milwaukee
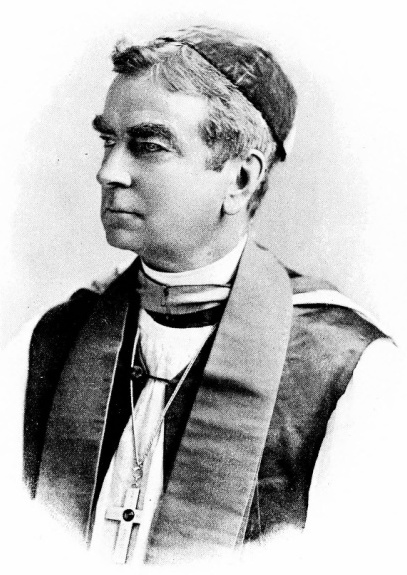
- Church: Episcopal Church
- Diocese: Milwaukee
- Elected: December 12, 1888
- In office: 1889–1891
- Predecessor: Edward R. Welles
- Successor: Isaac Lea Nicholson

Orders
- Ordination: 1855 by Alonzo Potter
- Consecration: March 26, 1889 by William Edward McLaren

Personal details
- Born: Cyrus Frederic Smith; March 28, 1831 Marblehead, Massachusetts, United States
- Died: June 8, 1891 (aged 60) Milwaukee, Wisconsin, United States
- Buried: Forest Home Cemetery
- Denomination: Anglican
- Parents: Cyrus Smith & Lucy Woodbury Prince
- Spouse: Elizabeth Pickering Nichols

Cyrus Frederick Knight (March 28, 1831 – June 8, 1891) was the fourth Bishop of Milwaukee from 1889 till 1891.

== Early life and education ==
Cyrus Frederic Smith was born in Marblehead, Massachusetts on March 28, 1831, the son of Cyrus Smith and Lucy Woodbury Prince. He changed his name from Cyrus Frederic Smith to Cyrus Frederick Knight on May 2, 1854, upon petition in Probate Court, Groton, Massachusetts. He was educated at Burlington College in New Jersey and then at Harvard University. He also graduated from the General Theological Seminary in 1854.

== Ordained ministry ==
Knight was ordained deacon on July 2, 1854, in Trinity Church, New York City, by the Bishop of New York Jonathan Mayhew Wainwright, and became assistant at St Luke's Church in Germantown, Philadelphia. He was ordained priest in 1855 by Bishop Alonzo Potter of Pennsylvania. He then travelled to England, attending several courses of lectures at the University of Oxford.

He served as rector of St Mark's Church in Boston from 1857 till 1867, and then as rector of St James' Church in Hartford, Connecticut between 1867 and 1877. In 1878, he became rector of St James's Church in Lancaster, Pennsylvania, a post he retained till 1889.

== Episcopacy ==
On December 12, 1888, Knight was elected as the fourth Bishop of Milwaukee, and was consecrated as bishop on March 26, 1889, by the Bishop of Chicago William Edward McLaren. Knight's primary consecrators were:

- William Edward McLaren, Bishop of Chicago
- William Stevens Perry, Bishop of Iowa
- Alexander Burgess, Bishop of Quincy

He died two years later, in Milwaukee, on June 8, 1891.
