= William Walter Webb =

American bishop

The Right Reverend William Walter Webb D.D., LL.D.
- Bishop of Milwaukee
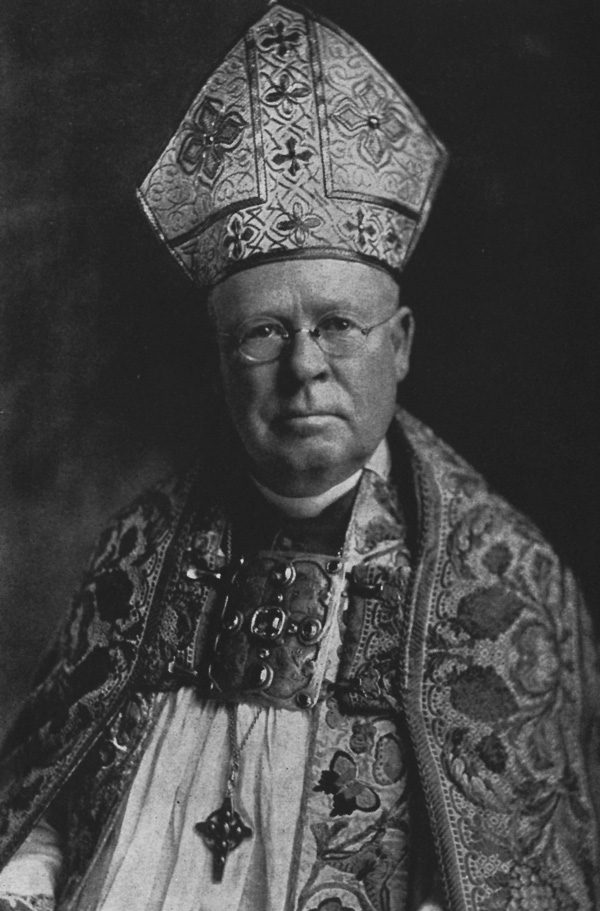
- Church: Episcopal Church
- Diocese: Milwaukee
- Elected: November 21, 1905
- In office: 1906–1933
- Predecessor: Isaac Lea Nicholson
- Successor: Benjamin F. P. Ivins
- Previous post: Coadjutor Bishop of Milwaukee (1906)

Orders
- Ordination: November 10, 1886 by John Williams
- Consecration: February 24, 1906 by Isaac Lea Nicholson

Personal details
- Born: November 20, 1857 Germantown, Pennsylvania, United States
- Died: January 15, 1933 (aged 75) Milwaukee, Wisconsin, United States
- Buried: Church of St. James the Less
- Denomination: Anglican
- Parents: William Hewitt Webb & Esther Odin

William Walter Webb (November 20, 1857 – January 15, 1933), was the sixth Episcopal Bishop of Milwaukee, from 1906 to 1933.

== Early life and education ==
Webb was born in Germantown, Pennsylvania, on November 20, 1857, the son of William Hewitt Webb (1835-1870) and Esther Odin Dorr (1835-1893). He was baptized on January 6, 1858. He was educated at the Episcopal Academy in Philadelphia, and then at the University of Pennsylvania. He left the University of Pennsylvania in his junior year to attend Trinity College in Hartford, Connecticut, from where he graduated with the a Bachelor of Arts and a Bachelor of Science in 1882. In 1885 he obtained his Master of Arts from Trinity College, whilst also studying at Berkeley Divinity School from where he graduated in 1885. He was made an honorary Doctor of Divinity in 1897 and a Doctor of Law in 1925, by Nashotah House.

== Ordained ministry ==
Webb was ordained deacon on June 3, 1885, by Bishop William Woodruff Niles of New Hampshire. On November 10, 1886, he was ordained to the priesthood by John Williams, Bishop of Connecticut. He became assistant at the Church of the Evangelists in Philadelphia. In 1889 he became rector of St Elisabeth's Church in Philadelphia, while in 1892, he was elected Professor of Dogmatic Theology at Nashotah House. In 1897 he was elected as President of Nashotah House. He also served as president of the Standing Committee of the Diocese of Milwaukee, and was its delegate to the General Convention of 1898.

== Bishop ==
Webb was elected Coadjutor Bishop of Milwaukee on during a special council on November 21, 1905. He was consecrated in All Saints' Cathedral on February 24, 1906, and succeeded as diocesan bishop upon Isaac Lea Nicholson's death on October 29, 1906. Like his predecessor, Webb promoted the Catholic heritage of the Episcopal Church. He remained in office till his death in 1933.
