= Benjamin F. P. Ivins =

American lawyer

The Right Reverend Benjamin F. P. Ivins D.D., D.C.L.
- Bishop of Milwaukee
- Church: Episcopal Church
- Diocese: Milwaukee
- Elected: January 1925
- In office: 1933–1952
- Predecessor: William Walter Webb
- Successor: Donald H. V. Hallock
- Previous post: Coadjutor Bishop of Milwaukee (1925-1933)

Orders
- Ordination: December 21, 1910 by John Hazen White
- Consecration: May 7, 1925 by William Walter Webb

Personal details
- Born: October 6, 1884 South Bend, Indiana, United States
- Died: December 2, 1962 (aged 78) Delray Beach, Florida, United States
- Buried: Nashotah House
- Denomination: Anglican
- Parents: Elbert Thomas Ivins & Lucinda Hart
- Spouse: Sarah Jane Seeber (m. 1908) Katharine Brewster Southmayd (m. 1953)
- Children: 1

Benjamin Franklin Price Ivins (October 6, 1884 – December 2, 1962) was the seventh Bishop of the Episcopal Diocese of Milwaukee.

== Early life and education ==
Price was born in South Bend, Indiana on October 6, 1884, the son of Elbert Thomas Ivins (1855–1903) and Lucinda "Lulu" Hart (1859–1897). He was educated at Trinity School in New York City, and then later at Nashotah House, from where he graduated in 1907. Following studies at Nashotah House Theological Seminary, he was ordained to the diaconate in December 1909 and to the priesthood in December 1910. He was a veteran of World War I. Ivins graduated from Valparaiso University in 1913, and received his master's degree from University of Wisconsin in 1918. Ivins practiced law briefly in Wisconsin.

== Ordained ministry ==
After ordination, he served as rector of St Thomas' Church in Plymouth, Indiana, between 1909 and 1913, later becoming head of the Department of History at Howe Military School. In 1914, he became rector of Christ Church in Gary, Indiana, where he established the first weekday school of religion in the country. In 1915 he went to Kalamazoo, Michigan to serve as rector of St Luke's Church. In 1921, he was chosen to become Dean and president of Nashotah House, posts he held till 1925.

== Bishop ==
Ivins was elected Coadjutor Bishop of Milwaukee on the first ballot, in January 1925. He was consecrated at Cathedral Church of All Saints, Milwaukee on May 7, 1925, by Bishop William Walter Webb. He succeeded William Walter Webb as diocesan bishop upon his death on January 15, 1933. In line with his predecessors, Ivins promoted the catholic heritage of the Episcopal Church. He retired on December 31, 1952, and died in 1962.
