= Charles S. Hutchinson =

American priest (1871–1942)

Charles Samuel Hutchinson (March 22, 1871 - November 9, 1942) was a prominent American Anglo-Catholic priest born in Lowell, Massachusetts. He attended St. Stephen's College, Annandale on Hudson, New York, and was graduated from the General Theological Seminary in New York in 1896. He was ordained to the priesthood on June 11, 1897, by Bishop William Lawrence of the Episcopal Diocese of Massachusetts and served as curate at All Saints, Ashmont and rector of St. Luke's, Chelsea, Massachusetts.

Hutchinson was rector of S. Clement's, Philadelphia from June 18, 1905, to September 26, 1920. During his tenure, the parish house was built and the church underwent extensive renovations along Anglo-Catholic lines including the erection of the Lady Chapel (Boudinot Chantry).

He became Dean of All Saints Cathedral, Milwaukee on November 1, 1920, serving in that capacity until 1930. He was rector of the Zabriskie Memorial Church of St. John the Evangelist in Newport, Rhode Island from 1930 until his retirement in 1940. He served in retirement at the Church of the Advent, Boston and died in Woburn, Massachusetts. Dean Hutchinson was a prominent figure of the Anglo-Catholic Congress movement in the Episcopal Church during the 1920s and 1930s.
