= Roger J. White =

The Right Reverend Roger John White.
- Bishop of Milwaukee
- Church: Episcopal Church
- Diocese: Milwaukee
- Elected: March 31, 1984
- In office: 1985–2003
- Predecessor: Charles T. Gaskell
- Successor: Steven Miller
- Previous post: Coadjutor Bishop of Milwaukee (1984-1985)

Orders
- Ordination: June 1967 by Henry de Candole
- Consecration: September 8, 1984 by John Allin

Personal details
- Born: January 31, 1941 Leeds, Yorkshire, England
- Died: August 28, 2012 (aged 71) Milwaukee, Wisconsin, United States
- Buried: All Saints' Cathedral
- Denomination: Anglican
- Spouse: Prudence Anne Paine
- Children: 3

Roger John White (January 31, 1941 – August 28, 2012) was the tenth Bishop of the Episcopal Diocese of Milwaukee.

== Early life and education ==
White was born on January 31, 1941, in Leeds, England. He studied at the Eden Theological Seminary in St. Louis, Missouri, where he earned a Bachelor of Divinity in 1965, and then at Kelham Theological College, graduating in 1966. He married Prudence Anne Paine and together they had three children.

== Ordained ministry ==
White was ordained deacon in the Church of England in 1966. by John Moorman, Bishop of Ripon, and priest by Bishop Henry de Candole in June 1967. He then served as curate at St. James' Church in Manston, Leeds until 1969, when he moved to the United States and became vicar of St. Alban's Church in Olney, Illinois. He then became rector of St. Paul's Church in Alton, Illinois in 1971, while in 1980, he became rector of Trinity Church and St. Richard's Episcopal School in Indianapolis, posts he held till his election to Milwaukee. He served four times as a deputy to General Convention from two dioceses.

== Bishop ==
White was elected Coadjutor Bishop of Milwaukee on March 31, 1984, and was consecrated on September 8, 1984, at the Archbishop Cousins Center in Milwaukee, Wisconsin. He served as coadjutor bishop in 1984 and 1985, succeeding as diocesan bishop on June 1, 1985. In the 1990s, he articulated a conservative position in the global debate on homosexuality in the Anglican Communion. During his episcopacy, he was also appointed by the Presiding Bishop to chair a committee responsible for establishing relations with the Russian Orthodox Church. He consequently travelled to the Soviet Union several times during the late 1990s and early 1990s, including after the fall of communism. He was also involved in the Diocese of Milwaukee's Haiti Project, to provide improved health care and education. White retired in 2003. He died on August 28, 2012, at Froedtert Hospital, after suffering an Intracranial aneurysm.

== Bibliography ==
- On Being a Bishop: Papers on Episcopacy from the Moscow Consultation (New York: Church Publishing, 1992) ISBN 9780898692358
- With Richard Kew, New millennium, new church: trends shaping the Episcopal Church for the twenty-first century, 1992 ISBN 978-1-56101-062-2.
- With Richard Kew, Venturing into the new millennium: Charting a new course for the Episcopal Church in the 21st century (Solon, Ohio: Latimer Press, 1994).
