= William Jay Lambert III =

American bishop of the Episcopal Church (born 1948)

The Right Reverend William Jay Lambert
- VI Bishop of Eau Claire
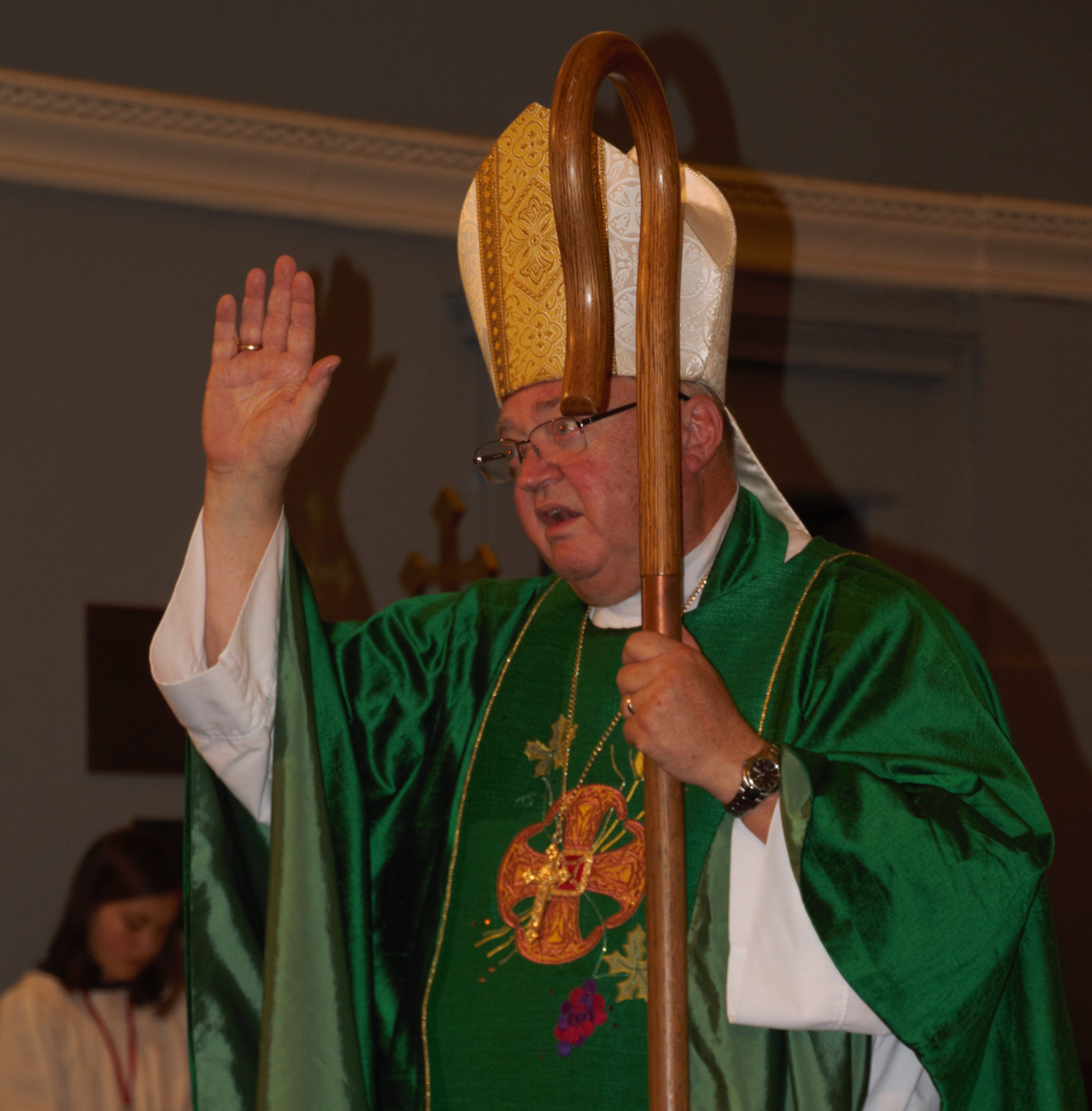
- Church: Episcopal Church
- Diocese: Eau Claire
- Elected: November 10, 2012
- In office: 2013-2020
- Predecessor: Keith Bernard Whitmore

Orders
- Ordination: May 1982
- Consecration: March 16, 2013 by Katharine Jefferts Schori

Personal details
- Born: October 2, 1948 (age 77)
- Denomination: Anglican
- Spouse: May Ruth
- Children: 3

William Jay Lambert III (born October 2, 1948) is an American bishop of the Episcopal Church. He was the sixth bishop of the Diocese of Eau Claire based in the state of Wisconsin from March 2013 to December 2020. In October 2021 he became rector of St. Phillip's Episcopal Church in Jacksonville, Florida.

== Biography ==
Lambert received a Bachelor of Arts in history and public affairs from Rollins College, a Masters of Arts in history from the University of Georgia and a Masters of Divinity from Nashotah House. He also served in the United States Navy and was a United States Naval Reserve chaplain. He was elected bishop of the Diocese of Eau Claire on November 10, 2012. He was consecrated to the episcopate on March 16, 2013.

== See also ==
- List of Episcopal bishops of the United States
- Historical list of the Episcopal bishops of the United States
