= Frank E. Wilson (bishop) =

American bishop

The Right Reverend Frank E. Wilson
- Bishop of Eau Claire
- Church: Episcopal Church
- Diocese: Eau Claire
- Elected: November 21, 1928
- In office: 1929–1944
- Successor: William W. Horstick

Orders
- Ordination: 1910 by Charles P. Anderson
- Consecration: May 1, 1929 by John Gardner Murray

Personal details
- Born: May 21, 1885 Kittanning, Pennsylvania, United States
- Died: February 16, 1944 (aged 58) Eau Claire, Wisconsin, United States
- Buried: Eau Claire, Wisconsin
- Denomination: Anglican
- Parents: William White Wilson, Irene Mayhew Ladd
- Spouse: Marie Louise Walker (m. 1911; d. 1924); Eleanor Lorinda Hall (m. 1929)
- Children: 1
- Education: Hobart College

Frank Elmer Wilson (May 21, 1885 – February 16, 1944) was an American bishop in the Episcopal Church. He was the first bishop of the Diocese of Eau Claire, serving from the creation of the diocese in 1928 until his death in 1944.

== Early life and education ==
Wilson was born on May 21, 1885, in Kittanning, Pennsylvania, the son of the Reverend William White Wilson and Irene Mayhew Ladd. He graduated from Harvard Preparatory School in Chicago in 1903 and later studied at Hobart College from where he earned a Bachelor of Arts in 1907. He graduated with a Bachelor of Divinity from General Theological Seminary in 1910. Hobart awarded him a Doctor of Sacred Theology in 1923, while the General Theological Seminary awarded him another in 1929. In 1929, he also received a Doctor of Divinity from Nashotah House.

== Ordained ministry ==
Wilson was ordained deacon on May 29, 1910, and priest later in the year by Bishop Charles P. Anderson of Chicago. He served as rector of St Ambrose's Church in Chicago Heights, Illinois, and in 1923 as rector of St Andrew's Church in Chicago. In 1915, he became rector of St Augustine's Church in Wilmette, Illinois, and in 1917 and 1918 he served as chaplain of the American Expeditionary Forces. In 1919, he became rector of Christ Church in Eau Claire, Wisconsin.

== Bishop ==
Wilson was elected as the first Bishop of Eau Claire on November 21, 1928. He was consecrated on May 1, 1929, at Christ Church Cathedral by Presiding Bishop John Gardner Murray. He died in office February 16, 1944.
