= Charles Hutchison (disambiguation) =

Charles Hutchison (1879–1949) was an American film actor, director and screenwriter.

Charles Hutchison may also refer to:

- Charles W. Hutchison (1865–1945), Wisconsin politician
- Charles Francis Hutchison (1879–c. 1940), surveyor and scholar active in the British Gold Coast
- Charlie Hutchison (1918–1993), Black-British communist activist and International Brigades member
- Charlie Hutchison (swimmer) (born 2003), Scottish swimmer
- Chuck Hutchison (born 1948), American football player
