= Isaac Lea Nicholson =

American bishop

The Right Reverend Isaac Lea Nicholson
- Bishop of Milwaukee
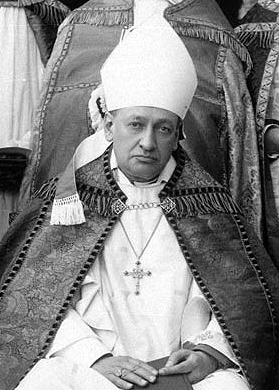
- The Right Reverend Isaac Lea Nicholson in 1900
- Church: Episcopal Church
- Diocese: Milwaukee
- Elected: June 16, 1891
- In office: 1891–1906
- Predecessor: Cyrus F. Knight
- Successor: William Walter Webb

Orders
- Ordination: September 22, 1872 by William Pinkney
- Consecration: October 29, 1891 by William Edward McLaren

Personal details
- Born: January 18, 1844 Baltimore, Maryland, United States
- Died: October 29, 1906 (aged 62) Milwaukee, Wisconsin, United States
- Buried: Nashotah House Cemetery
- Denomination: Anglican
- Parents: Johns J. Nicholson & Jane Ricketts
- Spouse: Adele Everett Ellicott

Isaac Lea Nicholson (January 18, 1844 – October 29, 1906) was an American Episcopal prelate. He was the fifth Bishop of Milwaukee, serving from 1891 until his death.

== Early life and education ==
Nicholson was born in Baltimore, Maryland, on January 18, 1844, the son of Johns J. Nicholson and Jane Ricketts. He was educated at St Timothy's Hall in Catonsville, Maryland, after which he entered his father's banking firm. After several years, he enrolled at Dartmouth College and graduated in 1869. He also studied at Virginia Theological Seminary and graduated in 1871. He was awarded a Doctor of Divinity from Nashotah House in 1890.

== Ordained ministry ==
Nicholson was ordained deacon by Bishop William Rollinson Whittingham of Maryland in Grace Church, Baltimore, on September 24, 1871, becoming curate at St Thomas' Church in Hanover, New Hampshire. He was ordained priest on September 22, 1872, by Coadjutor Bishop Pinkney, in St Paul's Church, Baltimore. He was appointed curate at St Paul's Church, Baltimore, where he stayed till 1875. Between 1875 and 1879, he became rector of the Church of the Ascension in Westminster, Maryland, while between 1879 and 1891, he served as rector of St Mark's Church in Philadelphia. He married Adele Everett Ellicott in 1880.

== Bishop ==
In 1891, Nicholson was elected Bishop of Milwaukee. Nicholson's consecration took place in Saint Mark's Church, Philadelphia on October 28, 1891. He had a heart attack in 1905, and a coadjutor bishop was elected to assist him. Nicholson was an influential Anglo-Catholic in the Episcopal Church, and championed the Catholic heritage of the church. In 1883, he was elected as Bishop of Indiana but he declined. He died in office on October 29, 1906, and is buried in the cemetery at Nashotah House.
