= Keith Bernard Whitmore =

American Anglican bishop

The Right Reverend Keith Bernard Whitmore D.D.
- Bishop of Eau Claire
- Church: Episcopal Church
- Diocese: Eau Claire
- Elected: 1998
- In office: 1999–2008
- Predecessor: William C. Wantland
- Successor: William Jay Lambert III
- Other posts: Assisting Bishop of Atlanta (2008–2017); Assisting Bishop of North Dakota (2019–present)

Orders
- Ordination: 1977
- Consecration: April 10, 1999 by Frank Griswold

Personal details
- Born: November 28, 1945 (age 80) Wisconsin, United States
- Denomination: Anglican
- Spouse: Suzanne
- Children: 2

Keith Bernard Whitmore (born November 28, 1945) is a former Bishop of the Episcopal Diocese of Eau Claire.

== Biography ==
A native of Wisconsin, Whitmore is a graduate of the University of Wisconsin–Madison and Nashotah House. Whitmore was Bishop of the Eau Claire Diocese from 1999 to 2008. Currently, he is Assistant Bishop of the Episcopal Diocese of Atlanta. Previously, he served as Dean of Christ Cathedral in Salina, Kansas and as a military chaplain in the United States Army. Additionally, he has been a member of the Berkeley Divinity School Board of Trustees. Whitmore is married with two children. In 2019, he became the Assisting Bishop of North Dakota in the absence of a diocesan bishop.

== See also ==
- List of Episcopal bishops of the United States
- Historical list of the Episcopal bishops of the United States
