= William Edward McLaren =

American Episcopal bishop (1831–1905)

The Right Reverend William Edward McLaren D.D., D.C.L., LL.D
- Bishop of Chicago
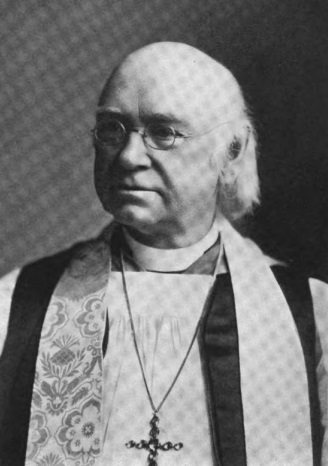
- Church: Episcopal Church
- Diocese: Chicago
- Elected: September 15, 1875
- In office: 1875–1905
- Predecessor: Henry John Whitehouse
- Successor: Charles P. Anderson

Orders
- Ordination: October 20, 1872 by Samuel A. McCoskry
- Consecration: December 8, 1875 by Samuel A. McCoskry

Personal details
- Born: December 15, 1831 Geneva, New York, United States
- Died: February 19, 1905 (aged 73) New York, New York, United States
- Buried: Rosehill Cemetery; 41.985564°N 87.684656°W
- Denomination: Anglican (prev. Presbyterian)
- Parents: John Finley McLaren & Mary Bull McKay
- Spouse: Mary Fake
- Children: 3
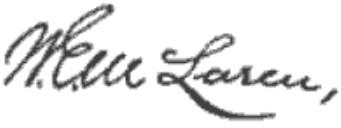
- Signature

William Edward McLaren (December 15, 1831 - February 19, 1905) was the Bishop of Chicago (formerly Illinois) in the Episcopal Church from 1875 until his death in 1905.

== Early life and education ==
McLaren was born on December 15, 1831, in Geneva, New York, the son of the Reverend John Finley McLaren, a Scottish Presbyterian minister. He was educated at the Western University of Pennsylvania and at the Jefferson College from where he graduated with a Bachelor of Arts in 1851. In 1854 he earned his Master of Arts from Jefferson. Later he started teaching and was involved in journalism. He commenced studies for the ministry in 1857 at the Pittsburgh Theological Seminary, aiming to become a missionary in China. He was awarded a Doctor of Divinity from Racine College in 1873 while Sewanee: The University of the South awarded him with a Doctor of Civil Law in 1882.

== Ordained ministry ==
McLaren was ordained a Presbyterian minister in 1860. He became engaged in missionary work in Bogotá, Colombia however he returned to the United States two years later due to ill health. In 1871 McLaren joined the Episcopal Church and on July 29, 1872, he was ordained a deacon in St. John's Church in Detroit. He was ordained a priest a few months later in October.

== Episcopacy ==
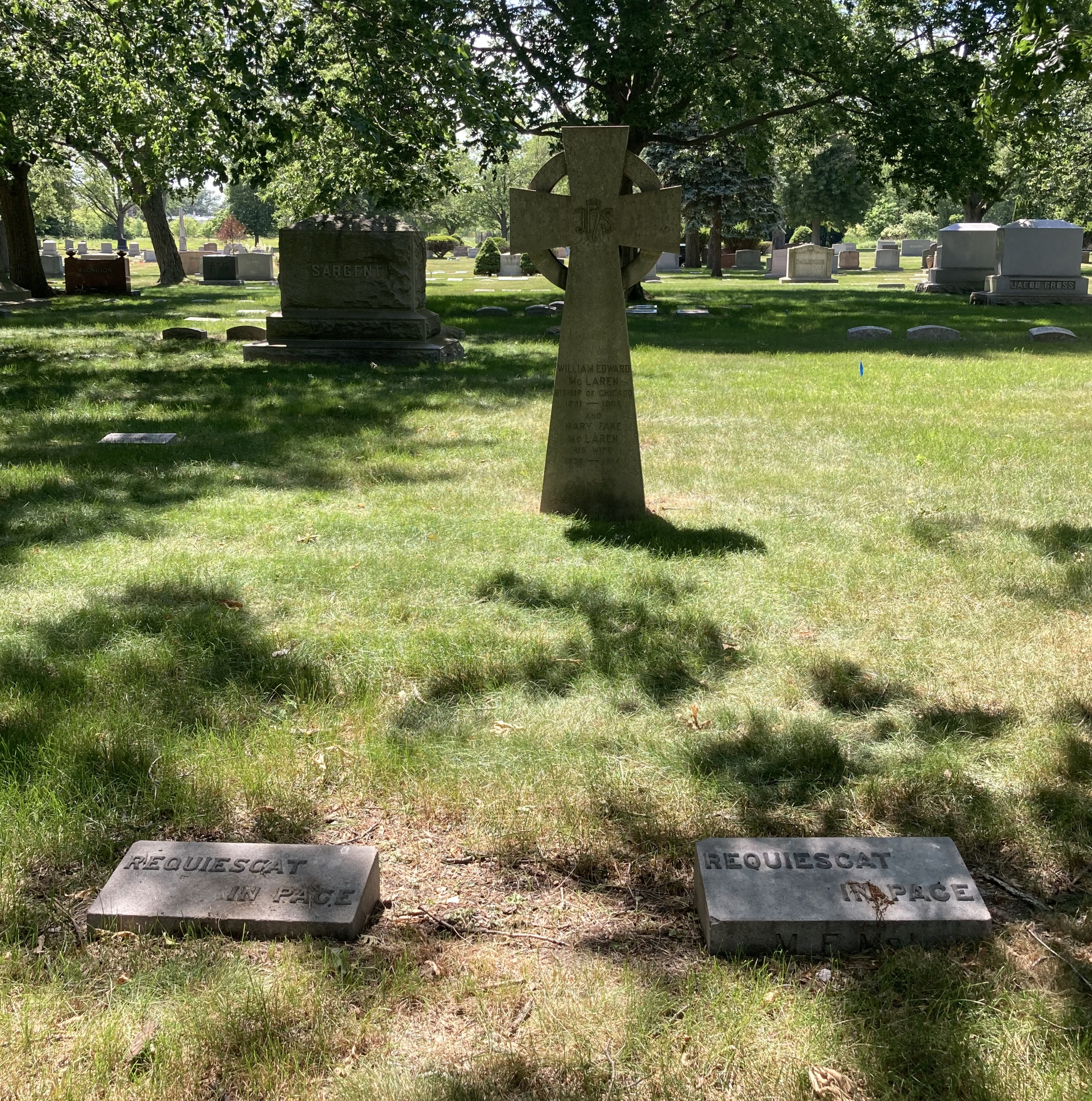
McLaren's grave at Rosehill Cemetery

McLaren was elected Bishop of Illinois in 1875 and was consecrated on December 8, 1875, by the Bishop of Michigan Samuel A. McCoskry. He became the first bishop to hold the title of Bishop of Chicago after the name of the diocese was changed in 1877. He is remembered as being the founder of the Western Theological Seminary in Chicago, which opened in 1885 (and would merge in 1933 with Seabury Divinity School of Faribault, Minnesota, to form Seabury-Western Theological Seminary). He died in office in New York City on February 19, 1905, and was buried at Rosehill Cemetery in Chicago.

== Works ==
He was the author of several books, including The Practice of the Interior Life and Earnest Contention for the Faith:

- Catholic dogma, the antidote of doubt (1883),
- Earnest contention for the faith (1891),
- The practice of the interior life (1897),
- The holy priest (1899),
- Lenten soliloquies for private and public use (1904),

== See also ==
- List of bishops of the Episcopal Church in the United States of America
