= Donald H. V. Hallock =

American bishop (1908–1996)

The Right Reverend Donald H. V. Hallock D.D.
- Bishop of Milwaukee
- Church: Episcopal Church
- Diocese: Milwaukee
- Elected: October 1951
- In office: 1953–1973
- Predecessor: Benjamin F. P. Ivins
- Successor: Charles T. Gaskell
- Previous post: Coadjutor Bishop of Milwaukee (1952-1953)

Orders
- Ordination: June 16, 1935 by Benjamin F. P. Ivins
- Consecration: January 10, 1952 by Benjamin F. P. Ivins

Personal details
- Born: April 13, 1908 Menominee, Michigan, United States
- Died: November 7, 1996 (aged 88) Lakewood, Colorado, United States
- Denomination: Anglican
- Parents: Frank Hudson Hallock & Anne Walbridge Brown
- Spouse: Ruth Clayre Graham (m. 1930)
- Children: 5
- Education: University of Wyoming

Donald Hathaway Valentine Hallock (April 13, 1908 – November 7, 1996) was the eighth Bishop of the Episcopal Diocese of Milwaukee.

== Early life and education ==
He was born in Menominee, Michigan on April 13, 1908, the son of the Reverend Frank Hudson Hallock (1877-1944) and Anne Walbridge Brown (1880-1949). He was educated at Carleton College between 1926 and 1927, before studying at the University of Wyoming, from where he earned a Bachelor of Arts in 1930 and a Master of Arts in 1933. He also graduated with a Bachelor of Divinity from Nashotah House Theological Seminary in 1935. He was awarded a Doctor of Divinity from Nashotah House in 1952. He married Ruth Clayre (also Clair) Graham (1908-1995) on September 14, 1930, and together they had five children.

== Ordained ministry ==
Hallock was ordained deacon on November 25, 1934, and priest on June 16, 1935, by Bishop Benjamin F. P. Ivins. He was priest-in-charge of Holy Trinity Church in Platteville, Wisconsin between 1935 and 1940. He also served as priest-in-charge of Kemper Memorial Church in Darlington, Wisconsin, Trinity Church in Mineral Point, Wisconsin, and St Michael and All Angels' Church in Shullsburg, Wisconsin between 1938 and 1940. In 1940, he served in the Army during World War II, leaving active duty as a colonel in 1946. He was consequently awarded the Legion of Merit. In 1946 he became rector of St John's Church in Grand Haven, Michigan, while in 1949, he became rector of Grace Church in Hinsdale, Illinois.

== Bishop ==
In October 1951, during the 104th annual council of the diocese, Hallock was elected as Coadjutor Bishop of Milwaukee. He was consecrated on January 10, 1952, by Bishop Benjamin F. P. Ivins. Among his co-consecrators, there were two bishops from the Polish National Catholic Church, including Leon Grochowski. He served as coadjutor bishop from 1952 to 1953 and succeeded as diocesan of Milwaukee on January 1, 1953, a post he retained his retirement in 1973. During his retirement, he assisted at All Saints' Church in Denver, Colorado. He died on November 7, 1996, at his home in Lakewood, Colorado.
