= William Edmond Armitage =

American bishop

The Right Reverend William Edmond Armitage
- Bishop of Wisconsin
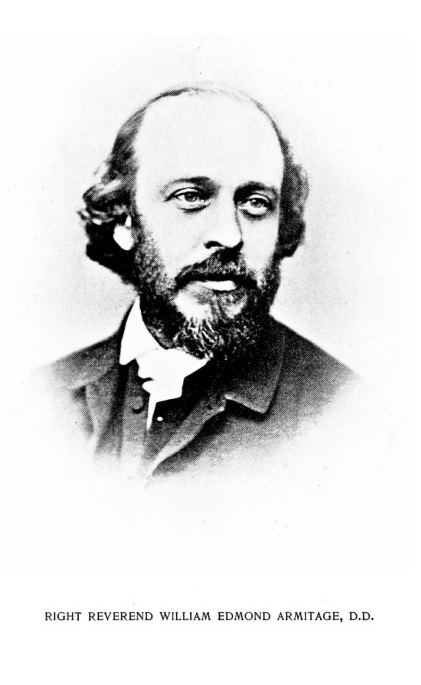
- Church: Episcopal Church
- Diocese: Wisconsin
- Elected: June 7, 1866
- In office: 1870–1873
- Predecessor: Jackson Kemper
- Successor: Edward R. Welles
- Previous post: Assistant Bishop of Wisconsin (1866–1870)

Orders
- Ordination: September 27, 1854 by George Burgess
- Consecration: December 6, 1866 by Jackson Kemper

Personal details
- Born: September 6, 1830 New York City, New York, U.S.
- Died: December 7, 1873 (aged 43) New York City, New York, U.S.
- Buried: Elmwood Cemetery, Detroit
- Denomination: Anglican
- Spouse: Charlotte Louisa Lambard
- Children: 3
- Education: Columbia University

William Edmond Armitage (September 6, 1830 – December 7, 1873) was a bishop of the Episcopal Church of the United States.

== Biography ==
Born in New York City, Armitage graduated from Columbia College in 1849 and the General Theological Seminary in 1852. He was ordained deacon at the Church of the Transfiguration, New York, on June 27, 1852, by Bishop Carlton Chase and priest at St. Mark's, Augusta, Maine, on September 27, 1854, by Bishop George Burgess.

Armitage died at St. Luke's Hospital in New York on December 7, 1873, and his remains are buried in Detroit, Michigan, at Elmwood Cemetery.

== Religious positions ==
Armitage's first ministry position was as assistant at St. John's in Portsmouth, New Hampshire. He was then called to St. Mark's, Augusta, Maine, until called to be rector of St. John's, Detroit, Michigan, where he was when elected to the episcopate. He received his doctorate in divinity from Columbia College in 1866.

Armitage was consecrated at St. John's Detroit on December 6, 1866, by bishops Kemper, McCoskry, H. W. Lee, Whipple, Joseph C. Talbot, Coxe, Clarkson, Kerfoot, and Cummins, together with Bishop Cronyn, the Bishop of Huron, Canada. He was coadjutor bishop to Jackson Kemper (1866–1870) and on the death of Kemper served as the second Bishop of Wisconsin (1870–1873).
