= William C. Wantland =

American Anglican Bishop (born 1934)

The Right Reverend William C. Wantland D.D.
- Bishop of Eau Claire
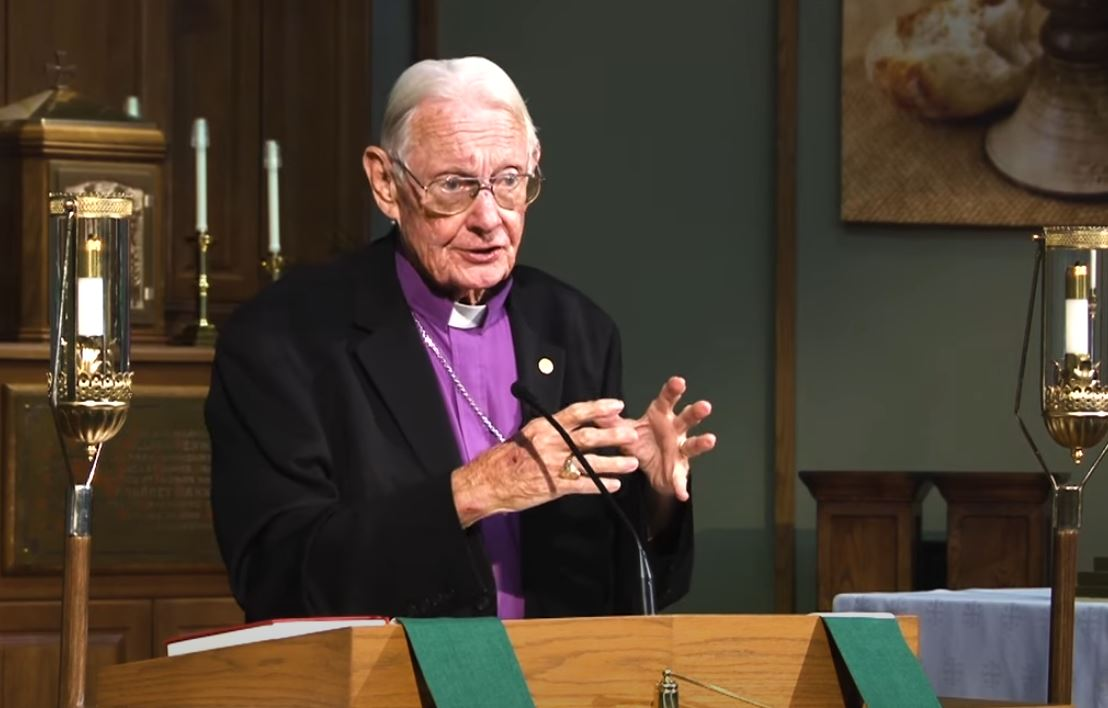
- Church: Anglican Church in North America
- Diocese: Eau Claire
- In office: 1980–1999
- Other posts: Assisting Bishop, Episcopal Diocese of Fort Worth

Personal details
- Born: April 11, 1934 (age 92) Edmond, Oklahoma

William Charles Wantland (born April 14, 1934) is an American Anglican Bishop. He is a former Bishop of the Episcopal Diocese of Eau Claire.

== Biography ==
Wantland was born in Edmond, Oklahoma. He is of Seminole, Chickasaw and Choctaw descent. In 1973 Wantland, his, wife, and their children were declared citizens of the Seminole Nation of Oklahoma by adoption.

Before ordination, Wantland was a practicing attorney. He served as municipal judge of Seminole, Oklahoma and on the Seminole City Council. He also served as vice-mayor of Seminole. He was attorney general for the Seminole Nation from 1969 to 1972 and from 1975 to 1977. In 1971, Wantland was the executive director of Seminole Housing Authority, and he served as its attorney general from 1971 until 1977.

Upon the advice of the Bishop of the Episcopal Diocese of Oklahoma, Wantland became a worker-priest at his local church. He later became a full-time priest.

Wantland became Bishop of the Diocese of Eau Claire in 1980. During that time, he was honored by the Lac Courte Oreilles Band of Lake Superior Chippewa Indians. He was embraced as one their own and was given the name 'Manido Nigani', meaning "He who stands forth in the Spirit", referencing his position as an Episcopal bishop.

After retiring from the Diocese of Eau Claire in 1999, Wantland helped to form the Anglican Church in North America. He was a founding member of the ACNA House of Bishops and helped write the ACNA Constitution and Canons. Wantland also serves as Assisting Bishop of the Episcopal Diocese of Fort Worth. He became the first chief justice of the Supreme Court of the Seminole Nation in 2011.

Additionally, Wantland has been a member of the faculty at the University of Oklahoma College of Law and Seminole State College. He is also a published author of a number of books.

== Bibliography ==
- Foundations of the Faith (Morehouse, 1983) ISBN 9780819213204
- Canon Law in the Episcopal Church (Evangelical and Catholic Mission, 1984)
- Who May Receive Communion in the Episcopal Church? (Evangelical and Catholic Mission, c. 1985)
- Women and the Episcopate (1987)
- In Defense of the New Prayer Book (1994)
- The Prayer Book and the Catholic Faith (1994)
- The Catholic Faith, the Episcopal Church, and the Ordination of Women (1997)

== Education ==
- Seminole High School - Seminole, Oklahoma
- Seminole State College
- University of Oklahoma
- George Washington University
- University of Hawaiʻi
- Oklahoma City University
- Oklahoma City University School of Law
- Geneva-St. Alban's Theological College
- Canterbury Christ Church University
- University of Cambridge
- St. Deiniol's Library, now Gladstone's Library
- College of Preachers

== Family ==
Charles W. Wantland, Wantland's grandfather

Anglican Communion titles
Preceded by Stanley Hamilton Atkins	IV Bishop of Eau Claire; 1980–1999	Succeeded by Keith Bernard Whitmore
