= Steven Miller (bishop) =

American bishop in Milwaukee (born 1957)

The Right Reverend Steven Andrew Miller D.D.
- Bishop of Milwaukee
- Church: Episcopal Church
- Diocese: Milwaukee
- Elected: May 31, 2003
- In office: 2003 – December 31, 2020
- Predecessor: Roger J. White

Orders
- Ordination: 1984
- Consecration: October 18, 2003 by Wendell Gibbs

Personal details
- Born: September 30, 1957 (age 68) Detroit, Michigan, United States
- Denomination: Anglican
- Spouse: Cindy
- Children: 2

Steven Andrew Miller (born September 30, 1957) is a religious leader who served as the eleventh bishop of Milwaukee.

== Biography ==
Miller was born in Detroit, Michigan, on September 30, 1957. He studied at Michigan State University, graduating in 1979 with a Bachelor of Arts, and then at the General Theological Seminary, graduating in 1984 with a Master of Divinity.

He was ordained deacon and priest in 1984 and served as curate at Christ Church in St. Joseph, Missouri. In 1986 he became vicar of Christ Church in Boonville, Missouri, and St Mary's Church in Fayette, Missouri. Subsequently, he also served as chaplain at the residential alcohol and drug treatment center. In 1990, he became rector of Christ Church in Gordonsville, Virginia, and in 1996 rector of St Alban's Church in Annandale, Virginia. He also served as regional dean in the Episcopal Diocese of Virginia and as president of the diocesan Standing Committee.

On the third ballot, Miller was elected the eleventh bishop of the Diocese of Milwaukee on May 31, 2003, and was consecrated on October 18, 2003, at the Mater Christi Chapel of the Archbishop Cousins Catholic Center in Milwaukee.

In retirement, Miller served as interim rector at Christ the King Episcopal Church in Santa Rosa Beach, Florida.

== See also ==
- List of Episcopal bishops of the United States
- Historical list of the Episcopal bishops of the United States
