= Edward R. Welles =

American bishop

The Right Reverend Edward Randolph Welles
- Bishop of Milwaukee
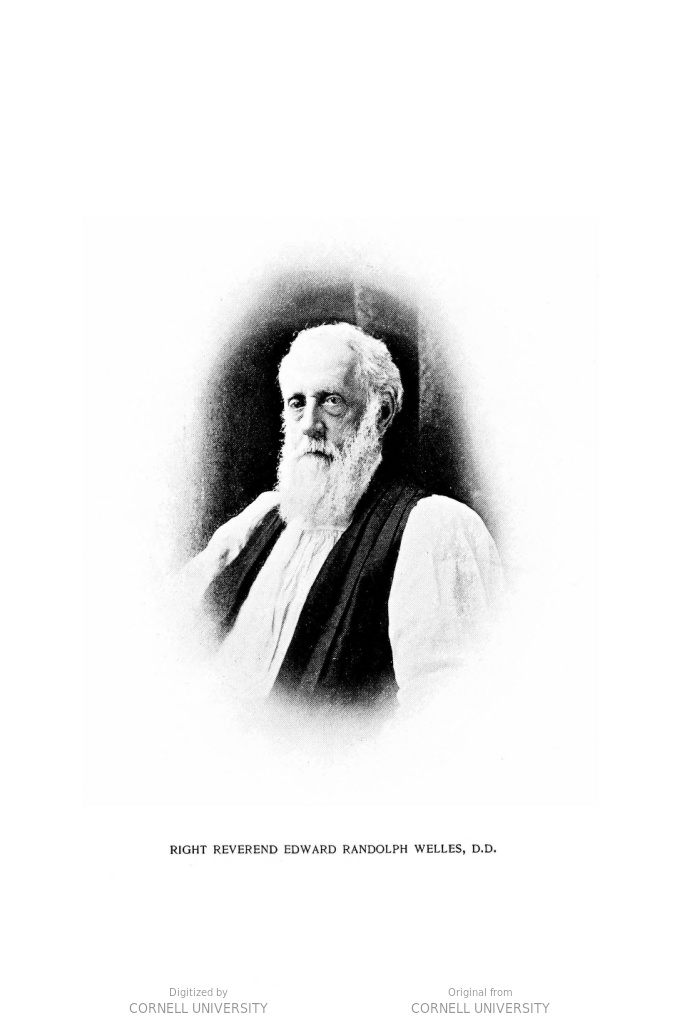
- Church: Episcopal Church
- Diocese: Milwaukee
- Elected: 1874
- In office: 1874–1888
- Predecessor: William Edmond Armitage
- Successor: Cyrus F. Knight

Orders
- Ordination: September 12, 1858 by William H. DeLancey
- Consecration: October 25, 1874 by Benjamin B. Smith

Personal details
- Born: January 10, 1830 Waterloo, New York, United States
- Died: October 20, 1888 (aged 58) Waterloo, New York, United States
- Buried: Forest Home Cemetery
- Denomination: Anglican
- Parents: Gardner Welles & Paulina Fuller
- Spouse: Mary Sprague
- Education: Hobart College

Edward Randolph Welles (January 10, 1830 – October 20, 1888) was an Episcopal clergyman who became the third Bishop of Milwaukee, serving from 1874 until his death.

== Early life and preparation for the ministry ==
Welles was born on January 20, 1830, in Waterloo, New York, the son of Gardner Welles (1784-1872), a physician, and Paulina Fuller (1789-1849). He attended Hobart College in the nearby town of Geneva, graduating in 1850. After a year of clerking in a law office, he announced his intention of entering the ministry. He prepared for ordination with the Rev. Dr. Martin of the Hobart faculty. During this period, he lived with the family of John Magee, a former member of Congress and leading citizen of Bath, New York, where he served as a tutor to the children. In November, 1854, Welles moved to Vicksburg, Mississippi, where he headed up a school for young ladies. He returned to New York in the summer of 1856 and took a job tutoring at De Veaux College, a newly founded school for destitute youth in Niagara Falls. He was ordained deacon on December 20, 1857.

The following summer he made a trip West with his father, during which he visited a college friend who occupied the pulpit of a small mission church in Red Wing, Minnesota. Soon after Welles's ordination to the priesthood by William Heathcote DeLancey, bishop of Western New York, on September 12, 1858, the young man moved to Minnesota, where the formative portion of his career was passed.

== Career in Red Wing ==
Welles was appointed to organize the parish of Christ Church in Red Wing, Minnesota, and became its rector, a post he retained until 1874. He received the degree of Doctor of Sacred Theology from Racine College in 1874.

== Bishop of Wisconsin ==
He was consecrated as Bishop of Wisconsin on October 25, 1874, in St Thomas' Church, New York City with Presiding Bishop Benjamin B. Smith as chief consecrator. He assumed the title Bishop of Milwaukee in 1886 following the creation of the Episcopal Diocese of Fond du Lac as a separate jurisdiction. He died in office on October 20, 1888.

Welles' primary consecrators were:

- Benjamin B. Smith
- John Williams (bishop of Connecticut)
- Thomas Atkinson (bishop)

He is buried in Red Wing, Minnesota.
