= Charles T. Gaskell =

Ninth Bishop of the Episcopal Diocese of Milwaukee

The Right Reverend Charles Thomas Gaskell D.D.
- Bishop of Milwaukee
- Church: Episcopal Church
- Diocese: Milwaukee
- Elected: 1973
- In office: 1974–1985
- Predecessor: Donald H. V. Hallock
- Successor: Roger J. White
- Previous post: Coadjutor Bishop of Milwaukee (1973-1974)

Orders
- Ordination: December 21, 1944 by Stephen Keeler
- Consecration: June 30, 1973 by John E. Hines

Personal details
- Born: October 23, 1920 Saint Paul, Minnesota, United States
- Died: September 14, 2000 (aged 79) Milwaukee, Wisconsin, United States
- Buried: Nashotah House Cemetery
- Denomination: Anglican
- Parents: Chester Welles Gaskell & Gertrude Pauline Michaud
- Spouse: Mabel Harriet Armitage (m. 1944)
- Children: 3
- Education: University of Minnesota

Charles Thomas Gaskell (October 23, 1920 - September 14, 2000) was the ninth Bishop of the Episcopal Diocese of Milwaukee.

== Early life and education ==
Gaskell was born on October 23, 1920, in Saint Paul, Minnesota, the son of Chester Welles Gaskell (1881-1972) and Gertrude Pauline Michaud (1889-1951). He was educated at the St Paul High School. He then studied at the University of Minnesota and graduated with a Bachelor of Arts in 1940. Following that, he commenced studies at Seabury-Western Theological Seminary, and earned a Bachelor of Divinity in 1944. That same year, on June 1, he married Mabel Harriet Armitage, and together they had three children. He was awarded an honorary Doctor of Divinity from Seabury in 1967.

== Ordained ministry ==
Gaskell was ordained deacon in June 1944, and priest on December 21, 1944, by Bishop Stephen Keeler of Minnesota in St Mark's Cathedral, Minneapolis. He initially served as priest-in-charge of Holy Trinity Church in International Falls, Minnesota, and St Peter's Church in Warroad, Minnesota. In 1948, he became curate of St Matthew's Church in Evanston, Illinois, while in 1949, he took upon himself the rectorship of Trinity Church in Rock Island, Illinois. In 1958, he became rector of St Mark's Church in Milwaukee, and in 1966 rector of St Luke's Church in Evanston, Illinois. In 1971, he was appointed Dean of St Luke's Cathedral in Orlando, Florida, a post he retained till 1973.

== Episcopacy ==
In 1973, Gaskell was elected Coadjutor Bishop of Milwaukee, and was consecrated on June 30, 1973, by Presiding Bishop John E. Hines. He became diocesan bishop in 1974 following the retirement of Bishop Donald Hathaway Valentine Hallock. He was a member of the Confraternity of the Blessed Sacrament and a priest associate of the Sisterhood of the Holy Nativity. He was a founder of the Evangelical and Catholic Mission. He retired in 1985, becoming a member of the board of directors of the Living Church Foundation, a post he held till 1996.
