= Christ Church Cathedral (Eau Claire, Wisconsin) =

Historic church in Wisconsin, United States

- Christ Church Cathedral and Parish House
- U.S. National Register of Historic Places
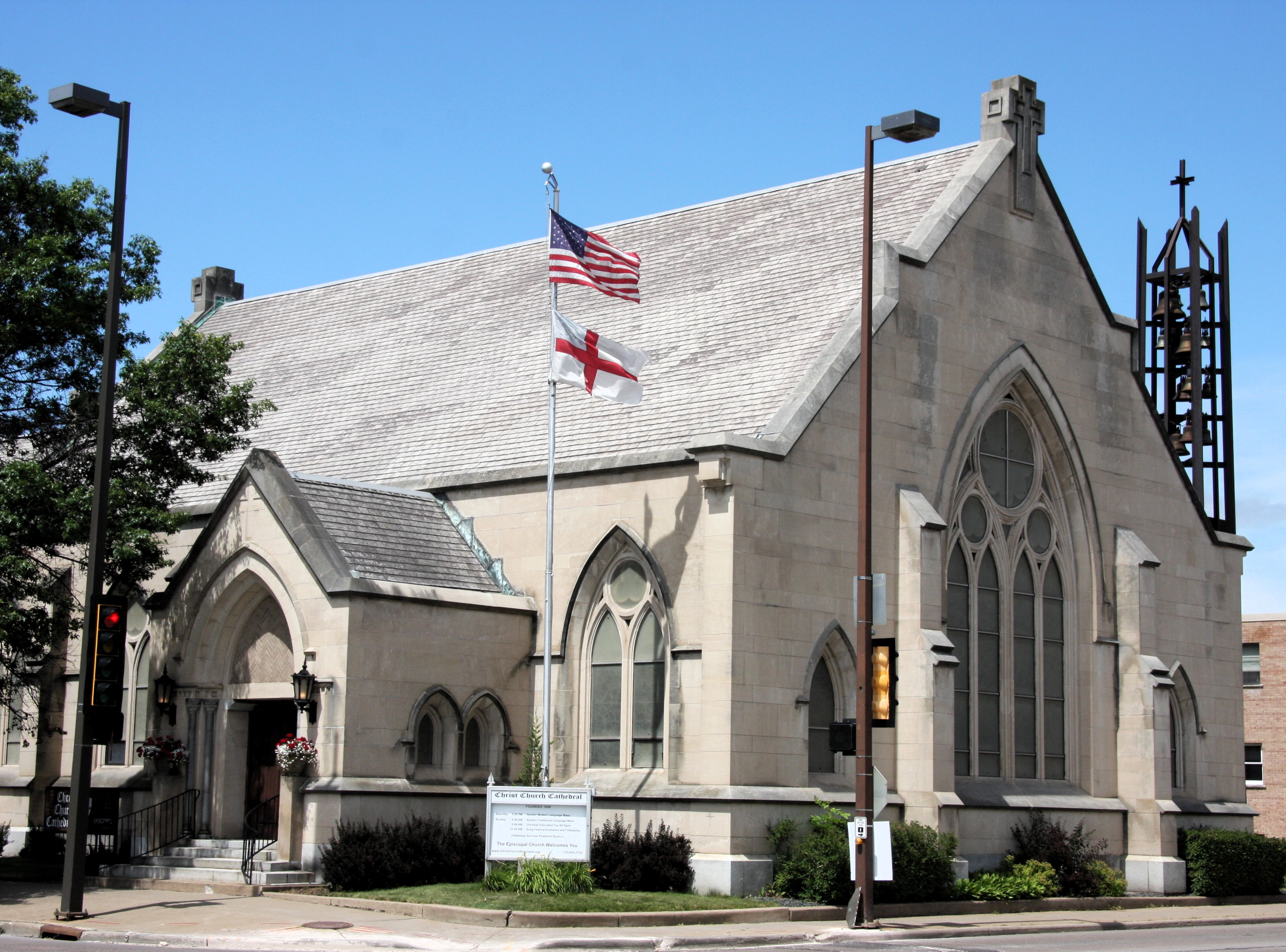
- Christ Church Cathedral in 2015
- Location: Eau Claire, Wisconsin
- Coordinates: 44°48′33.18″N 91°29′48.08″W
- Built: 1909-1910
- Architect: Multiple
- Architectural style: Late Gothic Revival
- MPS: Eau Claire MRA
- NRHP reference No.: 83003377
- Added to NRHP: January 28, 1983

Christ Church Cathedral, built in 1916 to replace the earlier 1874 building, is the Episcopal cathedral in Eau Claire, Wisconsin. It is one of the three cathedrals of the Episcopal Diocese of Wisconsin. It was formerly the mother church for the Episcopal Diocese of Eau Claire. The cathedral and parish house were added to the National Register of Historic Places in 1982.

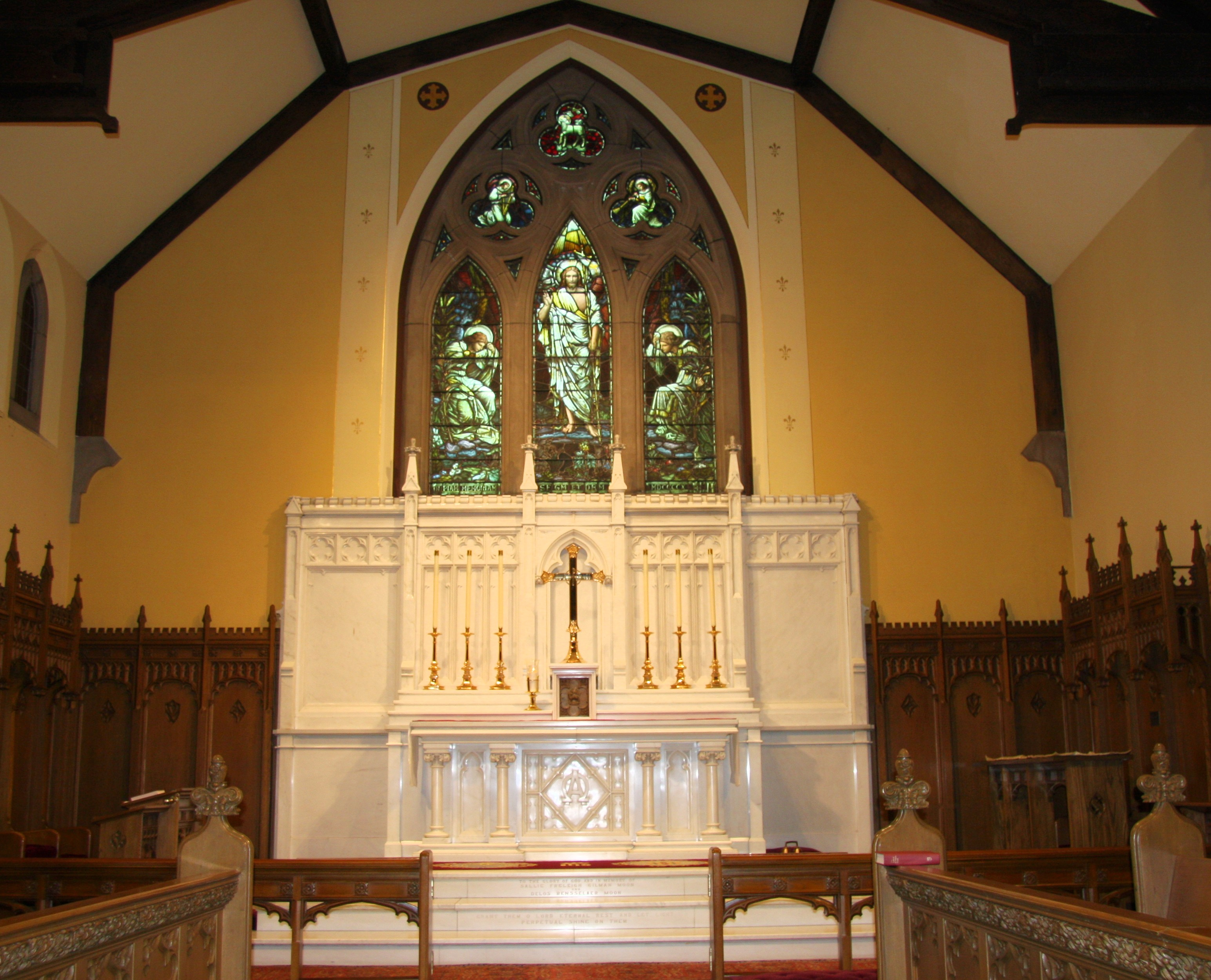
High altar of Christ Church Cathedral

The chancel and the parish house were designed by Minnesota architects Purcell, Feick and Elmslie in 1909. The nave of the church was designed by Purcell and Elmslie six years later. Their designs reflect their "use of English antecedents."

The cathedral has stained glass windows that a church pamphlet describes as 'among some of the finest in the country in richness and ecclesiastical style'. Six windows were designed by Heaton, Butler, and Bayne of London; others were supplied by Wippell Company of Exeter, England.

The parish house is a two-and-a-half-story stone and stucco building.

Also designed by Purcell and Elmslie is the Community House, First Congregational Church, also in Eau Claire, also listed on the National Register (in 1974).

== See also ==
- List of the Episcopal cathedrals of the United States
- List of cathedrals in the United States
