= Province of Southern Africa =

Anglican Catholic Church province

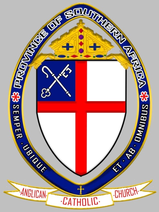
- Coat of arms

Location
- Country: South Africa, Zimbabwe, Tanzania
- Metropolitan: Dominic Mdunyelwa

Information
- Denomination: Anglican Catholic Church
- Established: 2021
- Cathedral: St. Stephen's Pro-Cathedral, KwaSokapase, South Africa

The Province of Southern Africa is an autonomous province of the Anglican Catholic Church (ACC). It constitutes the Third Province of the Anglican Catholic Church and has dioceses in South Africa, Tanzania, and Zimbabwe. As a part of Continuing Anglicanism which formed from the Congress of St. Louis, it is traditionally catholic in liturgy and doctrine and uses the 1954 Book of Common Prayer and its authorised derivatives. While it was episcopally reliant on the American part of the Anglican Catholic Church for many years, it is considered an African Independent Church.

== History ==
The Anglican Catholic Church in Southern Africa began in Polokwane in the Limpopo Province. In 2005, the Missionary Diocese of Southern Africa was formed and a Constitution adopted. Father Alan Kenyon-Hoare was appointed vicar general in July 2005 upon the death of the Venerable Innocent Nyoni. He had been rector and founder of the Parish of the Holy Paraclete in Edgemead, Cape Town. Kenyon-Hoare was consecrated on 7 October 2010 by Archbishop Mark Haverland, with bishops Rommie Starks, William McClean, Denver Presley Hutchens, Edward LaCour, Wilson Chan Awac Garang and Damien Mead as co-consecrators. He was enthroned as bishop ordinary of the Missionary Diocese on 7 November 2010. Kenyon-Hoare retired as bishop ordinary for health reasons on 1 March 2015. He died 20 January 2021.

In 1996, some former members of the Order of Ethiopia - CPSA split to form their own church, eventually joining the Missionary Diocese of South Africa. Immigrants from Ethiopia and other refugees also joined the church, citing openness to foreigners among the clergy. In 2012, a number of Ethiopian refugees, who had converted to Christianity and joined ACC parishes, came under attack. Fourteen ethnic Ethiopian parishioners in the Cape Peninsula were killed by Somalis of the al-Shabaab terrorist cell. Bishop Kenyon-Hoare helped three Ethiopians in mortal danger move to Australia for refuge.

In partnership with various charities, the Missionary Diocese of Southern Africa was able to coordinate donations for its local parishes in rural areas.

Kenyon-Hoare was succeeded by Dominic Mdunyelwa, who was received into the ACC from the Anglican Church in Southern Africa and consecrated bishop on 13 February 2015 by Archbishop Mark Haverland with bishops Alan Kenyon-Hoare and Solomzi Mentjies as co-consecrators.

At the XX Synod of the Original Province of the Anglican Catholic Church, which met 23–24 October 2013 in Newport Beach, California, the possibility of creating a province for the growing number of African dioceses was raised. At the next provincial synod in 2015, further organization was taken for South Africa with the view of creating a new province in response to rapid growth. In September 2021, by a vote of the provincial synod of the Original Province, the Province of Southern Africa was established. At the inaugural synod on 13 November 2021, the ACC's Province of Southern Africa unanimously elected the Right Reverend Dominic Mdunyelwa as its first archbishop and metropolitan. The Right Reverend Dominic Mdunyelwa was installed by Archbishop Mark Haverland on 14 November 2021. Additionally, the Diocese of Umzi Wase Tiyopiya and the Rt Revd Siviwe Samuel Maqoma were accepted into the newly created province and renamed as the Diocese of Christ the King.

The Diocese of Umzi Wase Tiyopiya had been organized by Bishop Michael Wright of the Holy Catholic Church-Western Rite. Bishop Banzana was consecrated its bishop ordinary in 2010.

== Organization ==
The newly autonomous Province was composed of 5 dioceses in South Africa, and the one and only diocese in Zimbabwe. The 2 remaining dioceses in South Africa voted to remain part of the Original Province. In 2023, the Province raised the Patrimony of Johannesburg to a diocese, bringing the number of dioceses to 7. In 2024, the new diocese in Tanzania was added. The Province now consists of the following dioceses:

- Diocese of Kei, Bishop Ordinary Dominic Mdunyelwa.
- Missionary Diocese of Ekurhuleni, Bishop Ordinary Elliot Mnyande.
- Missionary Diocese of Saint Paul, Pro-Cathedral in Port Elizabeth, Bishop Ordinary Samuel Mzukisi Banzana.
- Missionary Diocese of Vaal, Bishop Ordinary Jacob Qhesi.
- Missionary Diocese of Johannesburg, Pro-Cathedral of St. Cyrprian (ACC), in Pimville, Soweto, Bishop Ordinary Xolani Mhlakaza.
- Diocese of Christ the King, Pro-Cathedral in Makhanda, Bishop Ordinary Siviwe Samuel Maqoma.
- Diocese of Zimbabwe, Bishop Ordinary Elfigio Mandizvidza.
- Diocese of Port Elizabeth, Bishop Ordinary Sipho Goba.
- Diocese of East London, Bishop Ordinary Luvo Mandita.
- Missionary Diocese of Qumbu, Bishop Ordinary Siphiwo Maqanda.
- Diocese of Tanzania, Bishop Ordinary Philip Elibarik Kutta.
- Patrimony of the North West (South Africa), Vicar-General Ntai Sebidi.
- Patrimony of the Western Cape, Vicar-General Mzwardile Mzamane.

The episcopal roster also includes Rt. Rev. Augustine Koliti, Suffragan Bishop of the Diocese of the Kei, and Rt. Rev. Andile Ntamo, Missionary Bishop.

== Bibliography ==
- Mtuze, Peter Tshobiso (2009) Bishop Dr S. Dwane and the rise of Xhosa spirituality in the Ethiopian Episcopal Church (formerly the Order of Ethiopia), University of South Africa, Pretoria
- Kirk, Joyce F. (1998). Making a voice: African resistance to segregation in South Africa. Boulder, Colo.: Westview Press. ISBN 0-8133-2769-5. OCLC 37437511.
- Hayes, Stephen (1992). "The African Independent churches: Judgement through terminology" Missionalia 20:2, 139-146, hdl:10520/AJA02569507_225
