= St. James Anglican Catholic Church (Cleveland) =

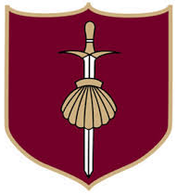
- Coat of arms
- St. James Anglican Catholic Church
- 41.513302°N 81.651553°W
- Location: Cleveland, Ohio
- Address: 1681 E. 55th St.
- Denomination: Anglican Catholic Church
- Churchmanship: Anglo-Catholic
- Website: https://stjameschurchcleveland.com/

History
- Founded: 1857
- Dedicated: October 10, 1890

Administration
- Diocese: Diocese of the Midwest

St. James Church, located at 1681 E. 55th St., Cleveland, Ohio, was founded in 1857 as a mission of Trinity Episcopal Church (now Trinity Cathedral). The first church was built in 1864-66 in an English settlement neighborhood at Superior Ave. and Alabama (now W. 4th). Rev. Richard Bury served until 1871, and the congregation was small and financially struggling. On October 10, 1890, the existing church on E. 55th at Whittier was dedicated.At that time, the neighborhood was populated by families of professional class workers in Cleveland. As the neighborhood changed, the congregation continued to come from further suburbs.

The church was designed by Horace B. Smith, with elements of Richardsonian Romanesque and Gothic Revival styles.

Theodore C. Foote was the first rector, followed by Vivan A. Peterson in 1919 and Frank C. Irvin in 1970. Carl William Bothe also served as an Assistant Priest before his retirement.

The church has been known for its music, with Walter Bodgett serving as choirmaster and organist from 1936-50. He led an annual music festival, where classical works premiered. A Holtkamp organ was installed in 1937 and restored in 1980.

In 1978, the church withdrew from the Episcopal Church (United States) and became a member of the Anglican Catholic Church.

The church remains known for its Anglo-Catholic traditions and music. The church contains a shrine to Our Lady of Walsingham, which was established in 1964 and has been a place of annual pilgrimage.
