= Diocese of Congo (Anglican Catholic Church) =

Diocese of Congo Eglise Catholique Anglicane au Congo
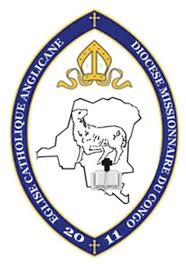

Location
- Country: Democratic Republic of the Congo
- Headquarters: Bukavu, DRC

Information
- Denomination: Anglican Catholic Church
- Established: 2004

Current leadership
- Bishop: Steven Ayule-Milenge

The Diocese of Congo is a constituent diocese of the Anglican Catholic Church (ACC) operating in the Democratic Republic of the Congo. It is separate from the Province of the Anglican Church of the Congo, which is a member of the Anglican Communion. The diocese was established in 2004, and registered with the government with the name “Eglise Catholique Anglicane au Congo” (ECAC). Steven Ayule-Milenge is its first Bishop Ordinary.

== History ==
According to the Anglican Catholic Church, the decision of the Province of the Anglican Church of the Congo to allow for the ordination of women to the priesthood in 2000 was opposed by a number of Congolese clergy. In 2003, the first woman, Muhindo Tsongo, was ordained by the Diocese of Boga in the Province of the Anglican Church of the Congo. Steven Ayule-Milenge, then a student at in Johannesburg, South Africa, met the Right Reverend Trevor Rhodes, Bishop of the Traditional Anglican Communion (TAC) in Southern Africa. After graduation in 2004 Ayule-Milenge was charged by Archbishop John Hepworth to establish the TAC in the Democratic Republic of the Congo. In 2005, under the leadership of Ayule-Milenge as Vicar General, the church had six parishes, with an additional 44 chapels, serving 1462 members. The following year, it was reported that the church had ten parishes, with an additional 64 chapels, and 2466 members with four priests.

Issues arose between the TAC and the new church due to the lack of episcopal visits for a number of years by TAC Primate, John Hepworth. At the 2009 diocesan synod, it was expressed that the lack of episcopal visits had resulted in other local churches doubting whether they were actually members of the TAC, and impeded the ordination of new clergy and prevented members from receiving the sacrament of Confirmation. The lack of any letter of acknowledgement or encouragement to the church by Abp. Hepworth during the time of war and armed conflict in eastern Congo was also a point of complaint. It was also alleged that Abp. Hepworth discouraged donations to fund their missions, and removed the TAC chaplain to French speaking churches for raising funds for the Congo. Ayule-Milenge opened communication with the Anglican Catholic Church (ACC), and ECAC joined the ACC in 2009. The Rt. Rev. Wilson Garang of Sudan visited the diocese in 2010. The Missionary Diocese of Congo was formally established at the Provincial Synod in October 2011 and Ayule-Milenge was elected as the first bishop of the diocese. On October 16, 2012, he was consecrated first Bishop Ordinary of the Missionary Diocese of Congo.

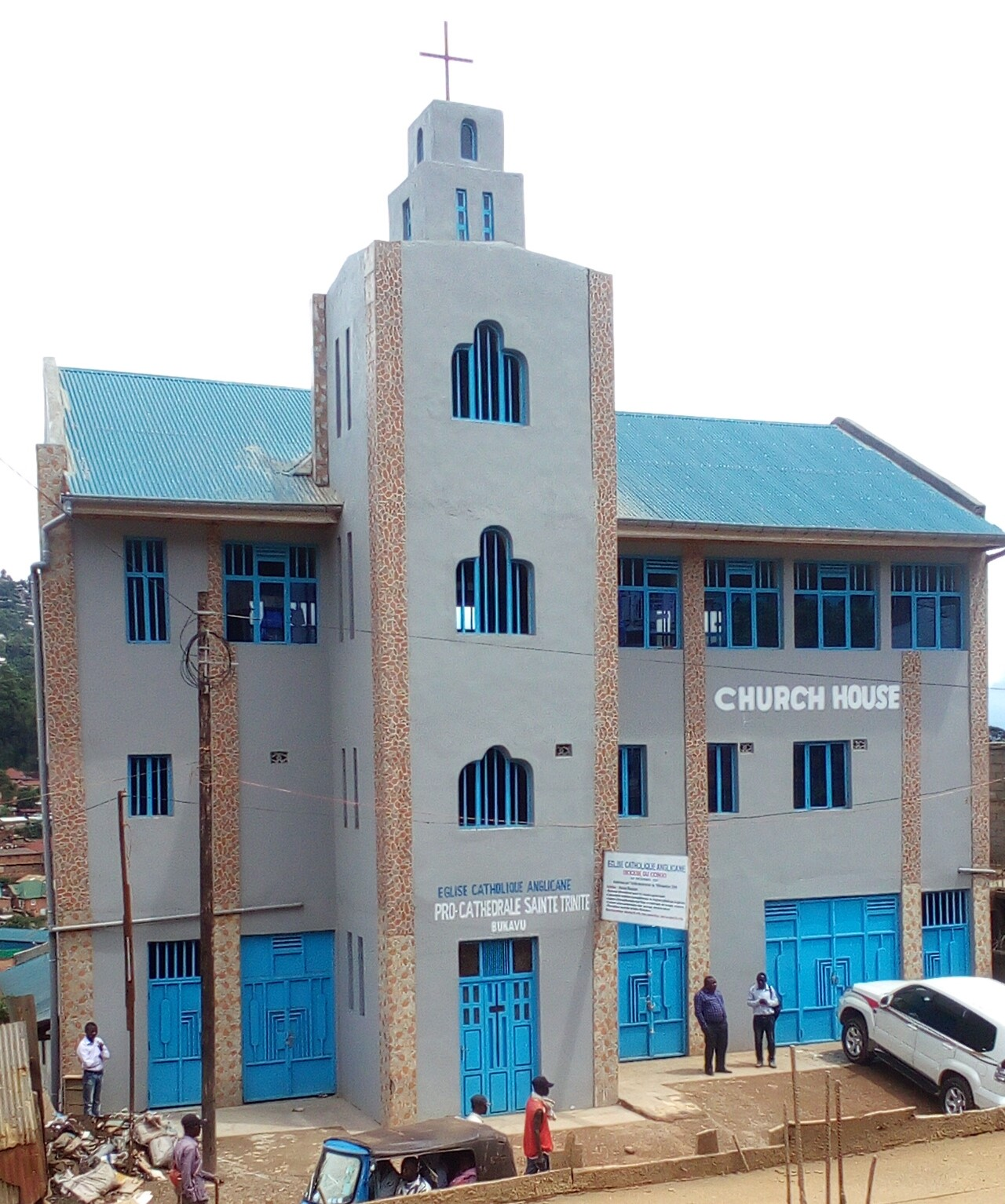
Pro-Cathedral Sainte Trinité Bukavu and Vocational Training Centre with Conference Room Bukavu. DRC

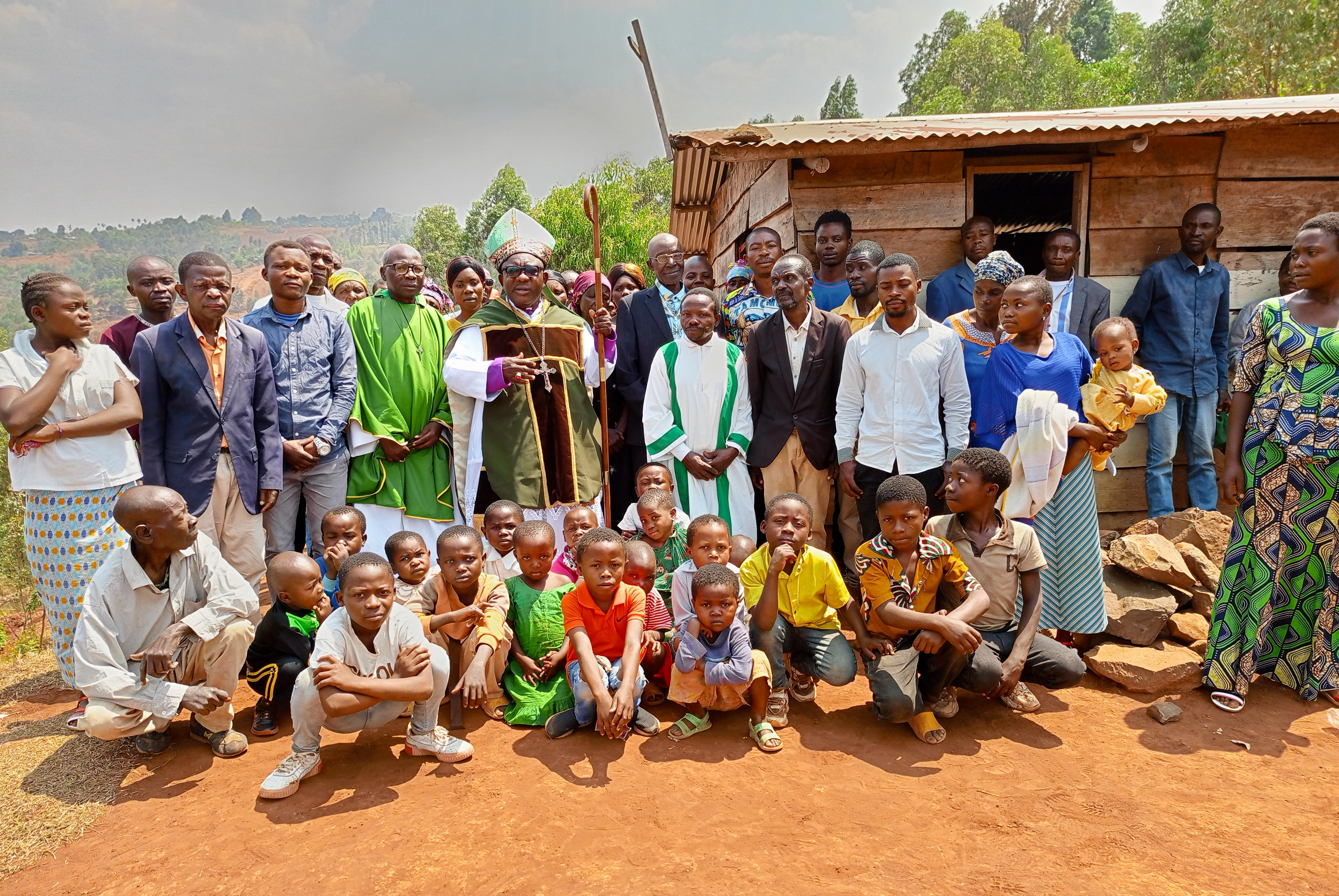
Congregation of Saint Jean Baptiste Evangeliste Cirhavanyi, Territory of Kabare Province of South-Kivu. Bishop Steven Ayule-Milenge during episcopal visit

=== Missionary Diocese of Eastern Congo ===
Due to the numerical growth, as well as the geographical size of the diocese and the difficulties of travel,. Ayule-Milenge proposed in 2014 that there should be two dioceses in Congo. Since 2021, the Diocese of Congo has been divided into two dioceses: the Diocese of Congo, which includes all the provinces of the Democratic Republic of Congo, less the territories of Fizi, Mwenga, and Uvira. These last three territories make up the second Missionary Diocese of Eastern Congo. The Missionary Diocese of Eastern Congo is headed by Bishop Lameck Mmokywa Mtundu as Bishop Ordinary.

== Humanitarian work ==
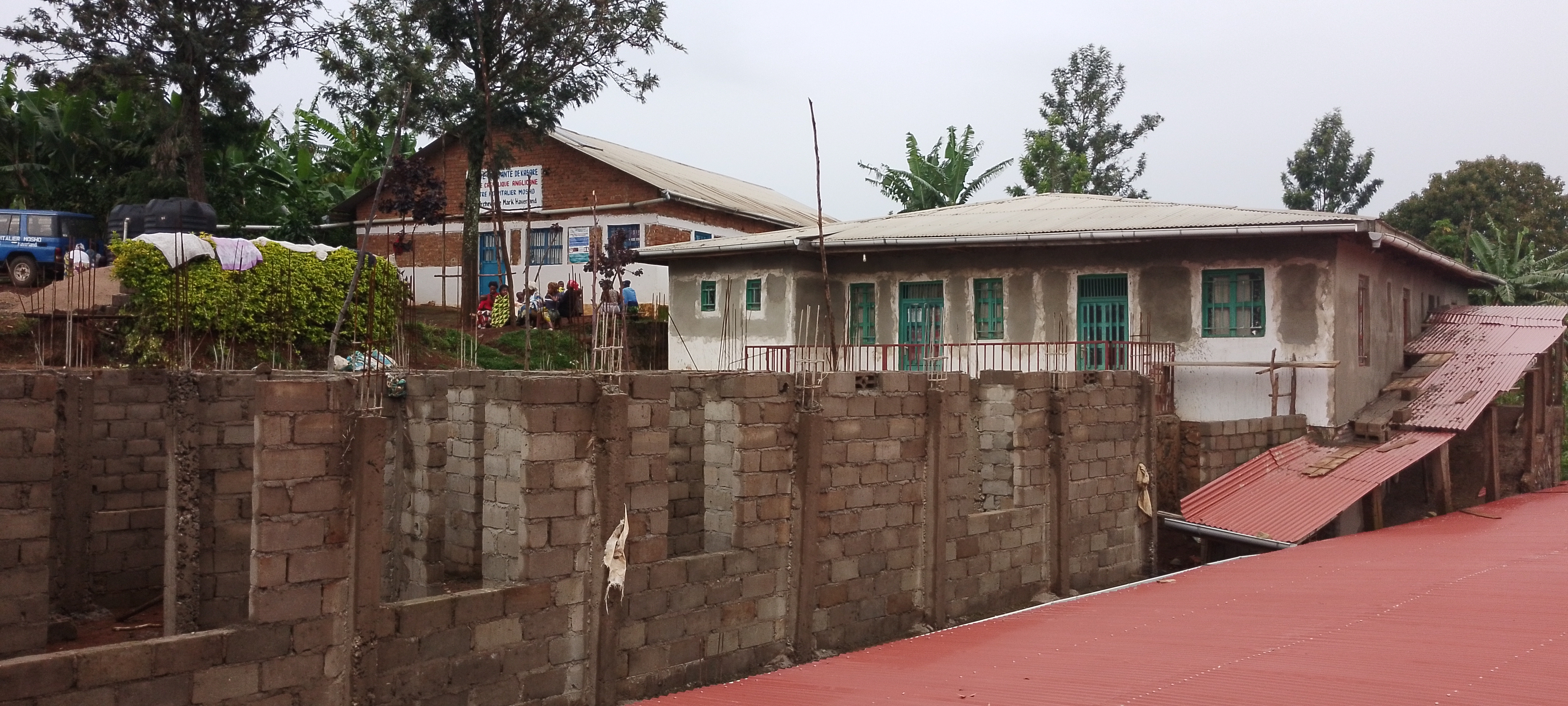
Archbishop Mark Haverland Hospital Centre in Mosho, DRC

Many of the parishes and missions in the diocese are plagued by deep poverty, and ongoing violence due to armed militias is prevalent in the eastern regions. Ayule-Milenge has organized humanitarian projects for local communities, providing economic assistance and counseling to victims of sexual abuse. A Sewing Training Centre was constructed with the financial support of parishes in the USA and Canada. This initiative aimed to empower sexually abused women by providing them with the skills to become economically independent. Ayule-Milenge also arranged for the installation of cassava mills to assist economic development. Additionally, Ayule-Milenge collaborated with the government to create new educational opportunities for both children and adults. The diocese received authorization to establish 76 schools across the Province of South Kivu, a region significantly impacted by the ongoing conflict. A vocational training center was also built in Bukavu.

Concerns about malaria and maternal mortality also led to the establishment of medical clinics. The U.S.-based charity The Wilkins Foundation sponsored the construction of medical facilities, including the Mark D. Haverland Medical Center in Mosho, which began construction in 2013, and completed in 2017. In 2020, the local minister of health licensed the facility as a hospital. The Dr. Thomas P. Sculco Building maternity ward was opened in 2020.

Ayule-Milenge has also organized humanitarian work through his parishes to address social issues such as malnutrition.

== Bishop Steven Ayule-Milenge ==
Steven Ayule-Milenge was born on October 20, 1962, in Mihenga, a small city in eastern Congo. His father was an Anglican priest. He attended primary and secondary school in the Democratic Republic of the Congo and then studied communications at University in Brussels. He completed his theological studies at Uganda Christian University in Mukono (UCU) and the South Africa Theological Seminary in Johannesburg, earning a Bachelor of Arts in Theology with a concentration in Systematic Theology in 2004. He later attended Trinity Graduate School of Apologetics and Theology in Kerala, India, earning a Master of Theology and Apologetics in 2012. He earned his Doctor of Philosophy (PhD) in Theology at Atlantic Coast Theological Seminary in Daytona, Florida, in 2014.

He was ordained a deacon in 1996 and a priest in 1998 in the Anglican Church of the Congo, and also served as Diocesan Coordinator of Communications for the Diocese of Bukavu. In 2001, he went to South Africa as a refugee following his father’s murder during unrest in eastern Congo. There, he joined the Traditional Anglican Communion and ministered to French-speaking refugees in Johannesburg. He founded and served as parish priest of Saint Francis of Assisi in Bezuidenhout Valley and acted as diocesan project officer from January 2001 to December 2004. He founded and served as the parish priest of Saint Francis of Assise in Bez-Valley and acted as Diocesan Project Officer from January 2001 to December 2004.

On October 16, 2012, the Feast of Saint Hedwig, he was consecrated the first bishop ordinary of the ACC Missionary Diocese of Congo at the Church of the Holy Guardian Angels in Lantana, Florida, USA, by Archbishop Mark Haverland, co-consecrated by Bp. Rommie Strarks of the Diocese of the Midwest, Denver Presley Hutchens of the Diocese of New Orleans, Edward LaCour, Brian Iverach, Donald Lerow, and Peter Robinson.

As a bishop in western Africa, Ayule-Milenge has also helped in the establishment of ACC parishes in Cameroon.

Ayule-Milenge has been an outspoken critic of western silence of the war in eastern Congo, and has called for peace in the region. Along with other African church leaders, he has criticized the Church of England for not following biblical teachings on human sexuality, characterizing the English church as being run like "a secular entity."

Ayule-Milenge has published a number of books on theology and the church in Congo, in both French and English.

- The Christian's Faith under fire: Issue of Liberal Theology. 978-3-330-70225-7. (2016).
- The impact of Missionary work in the Anglican Diocese of Bukavu: Illusion or Reality. 978-3-330-70224-0. (2016).
- Le Christianisme et le Socratisme: Approche comparative. 978-3-330-70740-5. (2016).
- The Devil in the Church: Issue of liberal theology. 978-3-330-70219-6. (2016).
- The image of God in man with special reference: The fall of man (Genesis 3) and the restoration of God's image in man (Romans 8:28-30). (978-3-330-70223-3. (2016).
- The Church is Central to God's Purpose: Creating Sons and Daughters in His own Image and Likeness. 9781684110124. (2016).
- Faut-il réviser la Bible?: La Parole de Dieu sous l'attaque de la pensée humaine. 978-3-330-70794-8. (2017).
