= Leo Michael =

American Anglican bishop (born 1962)

The Right Reverend Leo Michael
- Bishop Ordinary
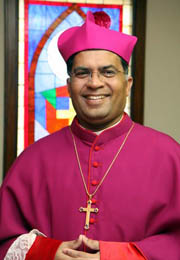
- Church: Holy Catholic Church (Anglican Rite)
- Diocese: Holy Trinity and Great Plains
- In office: 2008–present
- Predecessor: James R. McNeley

Orders
- Ordination: 1992 (Roman Catholic)
- Consecration: 2006 by Stephen C. Reber

Personal details
- Born: July 2, 1962 (age 64) Salem district, Tamil Nadu, India
- Education: Kristu Jyoti College
- Motto: Ad Majorem Dei Gloriam (To the Greater Glory of God)
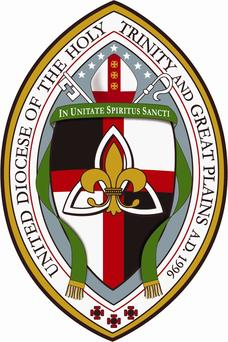
- Coat of arms

Leo Michael (born July 2, 1962) is an American Anglican bishop. He is the Bishop Ordinary of the Diocese of the Holy Trinity and Great Plains of the Holy Catholic Church (Anglican Rite). Michael was consecrated by Stephen C. Reber of the United Episcopal Church of North America in April 2006. He is married to Holly and lives in Liberty, Missouri where he serves as Rector of St. James Anglican Church.
