= Diocese of the Midwest (Anglican Catholic Church) =

Location
- Country: USA
- Territory: Kentucky, Indiana, Ohio, Michigan, Wisconsin, Illinois, West Virginia

Information
- Denomination: Anglican Catholic Church
- Established: 1978
- Cathedral: St. Edward’s Anglican Church, Indianapolis, Indiana
- Metropolitan Archbishop: Mark Haverland

Website
- https://stedwardsindy.org/diocese-of-the-midwest/

The Diocese of the Midwest is the official organization of the Anglican Catholic Church in the Commonwealth of Kentucky; the States of Indiana, Ohio, Michigan, and Wisconsin; the State of Illinois excepting the Counties of Madison, Monroe, Rock Island, St. Clair, and Whiteside; and the Counties of Cabell and Wayne within the State of West Virginia.

The inaugural synod of the diocese was held on January 7, 1978, in Columbus, Ohio, where Bishop Charles Dale David Doren was elected the first bishop of the diocese. An additional synod was also held in 1978 in Coshocton, Ohio.

Bishop Doren became bishop of the Diocese of the Mid-Atlantic States, and at the diocesan synod held in March 1979 in Grand Rapids, Michigan, William O. Lewis was elected the next bishop of the diocese. Lewis had been a priest in the Diocese of Quincy of the Episcopal Church, and was ordained in 1956. The next synod was held in Columbus, Ohio, in 1979. The March 1982 synod was held in Janesville, Wisconsin.

Lewis became bishop of the Diocese of the South in 1987, and Joseph Philip Deyman was consecrated in January 1988 as the next Bishop Ordinary. He had previously served as archdeacon of the diocese.

After Deyman died in 2000, Rommie Michael Starks was elected as the fourth Bishop Ordinary at the diocesan synod held at the Pro-Cathedral Church of St. Edward the Confessor in Indianapolis in August 2000. He was consecrated on October 14, 2000.

Since Starks's death in 2023, Patrick Fodor, Bishop of the Diocese of the Missouri River Valley of the Anglican Church in America, has been Episcopal Visitor of the diocese.

== Parishes ==
St Edward's Anglican Church, now the diocesan cathedral, was founded by the Mote family, who left All Saints Episcopal Church, Indianapolis, Indiana, in 1976. In May 1978, St. James, Cleveland, voted to leave the Episcopal Church and join the newly formed ACC. In a subsequent agreement, the Episcopal Diocese of Ohio transferred ownership of all parish property to the rector and people of St. James. St. John's, Dayton, Kentucky, also withdrew from the Episcopal Church in 1978 to join the Anglican Catholic Church. In 1980, St. Paul's Episcopal Church in Grand Rapids, Michigan, voted to leave the Episcopal Church and join the Anglican Catholic Church. In 2025, following controversy over Calvin Robinson, the parish voted to leave the ACC.

At present, the diocese consists of the following parishes:

- All Saints, Dayton, Ohio
- Anglican Church of St. Andrew the Evangelist, Merrillville, Indiana
- St. Edward's Anglican Church (Diocesan Cathedral), Indianapolis, Indiana
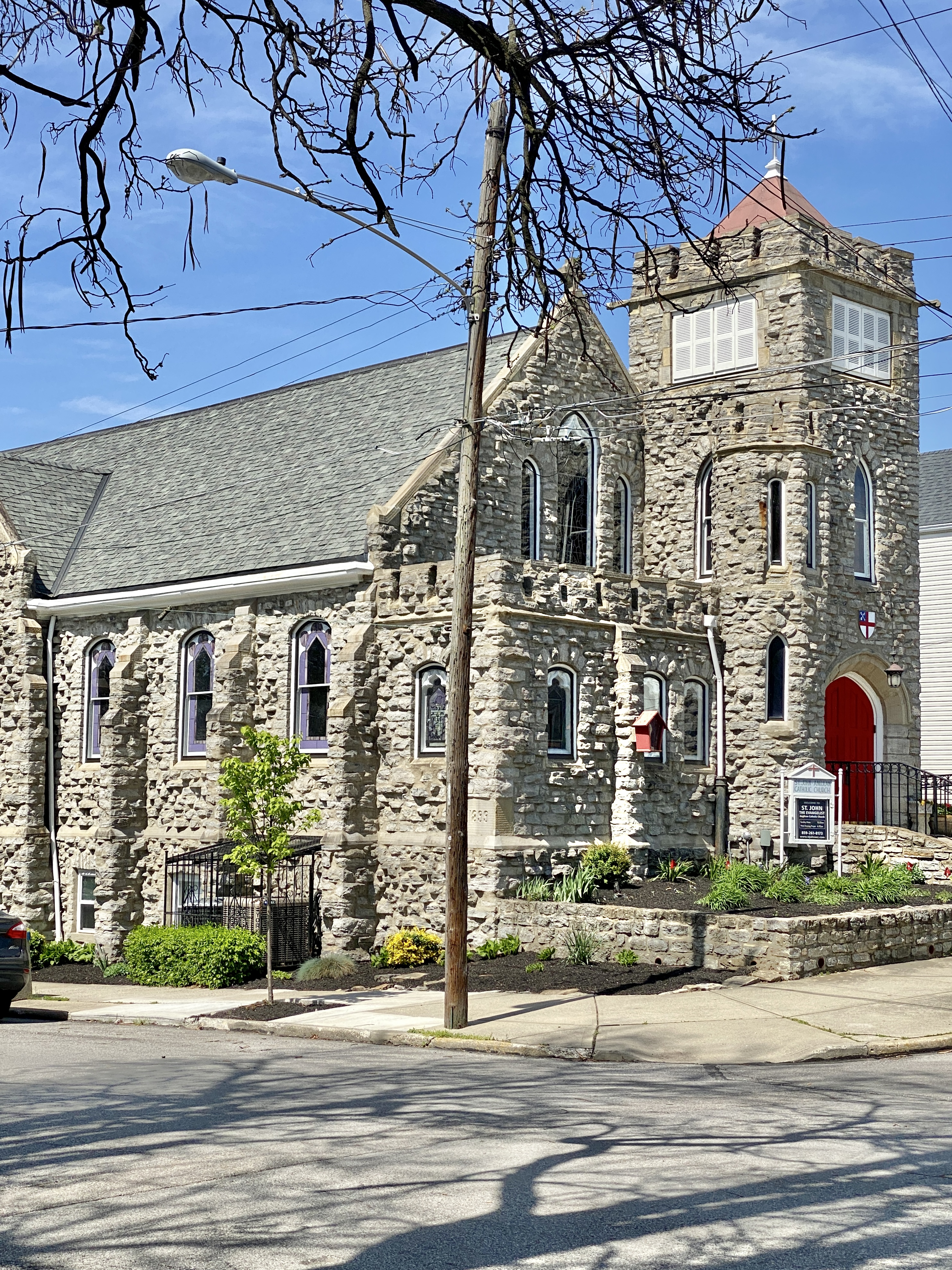
- St. John the Evangelist in Dayton, Kentucky
  St. John the Evangelist, Dayton, Kentucky
- St. John's Anglican Catholic Church, Menomonee Falls, Wisconsin
- St. Mary's Anglican Catholic Church, Akron, Ohio
- The Anglican Catholic Church of St. James, Cleveland, Ohio

== Notable persons ==
- The Most Reverend William O. Lewis (? – September 23, 1997), bishop of the Diocese of the Midwest (1979–1987), bishop of the Diocese of the South (1987–1997), and archbishop (1991–1997)
- The Right Reverend Joseph Philip Deyman (11 June 1940 - 23 May 2000), bishop of the Diocese of the Midwest (1988–2000)
- The Venerable Joseph DeHart (June 1, 1939 - February 26, 2010), Archdeacon
- William G. Batchelder III (December 19, 1942 – February 12, 2022), longtime member of St. Mary's Anglican Catholic Church, Akron, Ohio.
- The Right Reverend Rommie Michael Starks (January 7, 1955 — August 21, 2023), Bishop Ordinary 2000-2023
