= Holy Catholic Church Anglican Rite =

American Christian denomination, 1999-

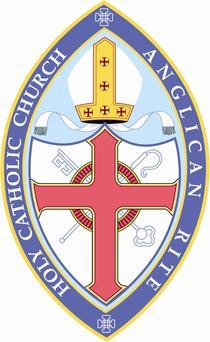
- Classification: Continuing Anglican
- Orientation: Anglo-Catholic
- Polity: Episcopal
- Region: United States, Latin America, China, India
- Origin: 1999
- Separated from: Anglican Catholic Church
- Official website: holycatholicanglican.org

The Holy Catholic Church Anglican Rite (HCCAR), also known as the Anglican Rite Catholic Church, is a body of Christians in the Continuing Anglican movement. It is represented by dioceses and missionary jurisdictions in the United States, Latin America, and India.

== History ==
=== Founding and apostolic succession ===
In 1991, the Anglican Catholic Church, a Continuing Anglican body led at the time by Archbishop Louis Falk, split over its merger agreement with the American Episcopal Church. Parishes that refused the merger, a majority, continued under the name Anglican Catholic Church, Original Province (ACC-OP). The apostolic succession of the bishops of the Holy Catholic Church (Anglican Rite) can be traced back to the Anglican succession maintained in the original consecrations of Continuing Anglicans. This succession includes the following bishops: the Right Reverend Albert A. Chambers, the Right Reverend Francisco Pagtakhan, the Right Reverend Charles Doren, and the Right Reverend Robert S. Morse.

=== Western Rite conflict ===
In 1997, a succession dispute arose among the bishops of the ACC-OP, which led to the formation of the Holy Catholic Church Anglican Rite. In March of that year Archbishop William Lewis, metropolitan of the ACC-OP, suffered a stroke, an event which led to questions about his ability to continue in his post. Thereafter a dispute arose regarding whether Thomas J. Kleppinger or John Cahoon was the senior bishop ordinary in line to become acting metropolitan upon the death or disability of Lewis.

In June 1997, Lewis submitted the question to the ACC-OP's provincial court. An attempted settlement of the issue in July fell apart at a meeting of the bishops on August 4, which ended abruptly. The next day, bishops James McNeley, Arthur Seeland, and Leslie Hamlett announced that Archbishop Lewis was incapacitated and declared Bishop Kleppinger acting metropolitan. On August 6, Kleppinger, Hamlett, and Seeland called on the bishops, clergy, and lay members of the church to repudiate "Traditional Episcopalians". Kleppinger signed the letter under the title of acting metropolitan, also joined later by bishops McNeley and Alexander Price. On August 7, Archbishop Lewis issued a writ of inhibition against McNeley (suspending him from the exercise of his office), alleging that McNeley had struck Bishop Joseph Deyman at the meeting and thereby excommunicated himself. On August 19, Lewis charged the five with "invasion of the patrimony of the metropolitan" and issued writs of inhibition against the rest of the group.

On August 28, the ACC's provincial court ruled that Cahoon was senior bishop ordinary, and when Lewis died on September 23, 1997, Cahoon assumed the role of acting metropolitan. He was succeeded by a new metropolitan, Bishop Michael Stephens, elected by a biennial provincial synod in Norfolk, Virginia on October 15. Meanwhile, the five dissenting bishops, Bishop Thomas J. Kleppinger, Bishop McNeley, Bishop Seeland, Bishop Leslie Hamlett and Bishop Victor Cruz-Blanco, met as another synod in Allentown, Pennsylvania, and elected Bishop Hamlett as metropolitan.

By 1999, the dissenting bishops had separated into groups forming two new churches, the Holy Catholic Church Western Rite, friendly to Eastern Orthodox theology and skeptical about Anglicanism's doctrinal comprehensiveness, and the Holy Catholic Church Anglican Rite, following traditional Anglo-Catholic theology.

In 2005, Bishop Leslie Hamlett, along with Bishop Appleton and Bishop James, were deposed and expelled. Bishop Michael M. Wright was elected as the new metropolitan of the Holy Catholic Church—Western Rite, with the support of Cruz-Blanco, Banzana and Kleppinger. and held that position until his death in 2009. Bishop Wright had previously been the archdeacon of the Missionary Diocese of the United Kingdom of the Anglican Catholic Church.

In 2008, Bishop Leo Michael succeeded Bishop McNeley as bishop of the Diocese of the Great Plains. After the death of Bishop Wright, Bishop Michael took leadership of the church.

=== 2010 reunion attempt ===
In March 2010, the bishops of the Holy Catholic Church Western Rite and the Holy Catholic Church Anglican Rite entered into full communion as one church, but retaining both names, in addition to a third name, Anglican Rite Catholic Church, Original Province, with Bishop Kleppinger as metropolitan.

At the time of the 2010 union, these dioceses were reported:

- Diocese of the Holy Trinity and Great Plains
- Diocese of the Pacific and Southwest
- Diocese of the Resurrection
- Diocese of the Caribbean and New Granada
- Missionary Diocese of American Indian People
- Diocese of Europe
- Diocese of Umzi Wase Tiyopiya (Africa)

By the end of 2010, however, the HCC-AR magazine, Koinonia, had dropped references to Kleppinger from its pages and Bishop Leo Michael, in an editorial, had criticized suggestions of diluting the Anglican identity of HCC-AR through "Western Rite" approaches.

== Leadership ==
=== Diocese of the Holy Trinity and Great Plains ===
- The Most Rev. J. Leo Michael, Presiding Bishop & Primate

=== Missionary Jurisdiction of India ===
- The Rt. Rev. Edmund Jayaraj, missionary bishop

=== Province of South America ===
- The Rt. Rev. Luis Carlos García Medina, bishop ordinary

==== Deceased ====
The Right Reverend Arthur David Seeland (October 31, 1931 - October 23, 2009), retired bishop of the Diocese of the Pacific Southwest (1993-2008)

The Right Reverend Michael Wright (??? - March 23, 2009), metropolitan (2005-2009)

== Monastic communities ==
=== Third Order of Saint Francis ===
- A third order within the Franciscan movement founded by St. Francis of Assisi. The Franciscan orders in the Anglican Rite Catholic Church are a continuation of the orders brought to the British Isles in 1224 by Agnellus of Pisa. In 1976, the Franciscan order was continued in the HCC-AR under the organization of the Rt. Rev'd Frank Knutti.

== Publications ==
=== Koinonia ===
- The provincial newsletter for the Holy Catholic Church (Anglican Rite), called Koinonia, is published quarterly by St. James Anglican Church (Diocese of the Holy Trinity and the Great Plains).
