= Diocese of the United Kingdom =

Diocese of the Anglican Catholic Church

Location
- Country: United Kingdom
- Ecclesiastical province: Anglican Catholic Church Original Province
- Deaneries: North, South

Information
- Denomination: Anglican Catholic Church
- Established: 1992
- Cathedral: Pro-Cathedral of St Augustine of Canterbury

Current leadership
- Bishop: Damien Mead

Website
- anglicancatholic.org.uk

The Diocese of the United Kingdom is a diocese of the Anglican Catholic Church (ACC). Encompassing the entire area of the United Kingdom, it is one of the dioceses of the original province of the Anglican Catholic Church and is not a part of the Church of England or the Anglican Communion. It is also separate from the Free Church of England, the Personal Ordinariate of Our Lady of Walsingham, the Society of St Wilfred and St Hilda and the Church of England (Continuing). The diocese was formed, like the rest of the ACC, in response to changes doctrinal changes within the Anglican Communion.

The Diocese of the United Kingdom is a part of the Continuing Anglican movement which arose from the Congress of St. Louis in 1977. It was established in 1992 as the Missionary Diocese of England and Wales.

== History ==
The Reverend Leslie Hamlett and his congregation from Stoke-on-Trent were instrumental in the founding of the missionary diocese. He had been ordained in the Church of England in 1962 and was a parish priest. Hamlett and his congregation left the Church of England in 1983. In March 1992, Hamlett was elected bishop when the archbishop of the Anglican Catholic Church, William O. Lewis, visited his parish. On 1 August 1992, he was consecrated as the diocese's first bishop ordinary by bishops James Orin Mote, William Francis Burns, Thomas Justin Kleppinger, Michael Dean Stephens, Joseph Philip Deyman and James Richard McNeley. In the 1993 debate in Parliament concerning the Priests (Ordination of Women) Measure, Lord Sudeley advocated for the Anglican Catholic Church as the alternative for those rejecting the measure.

Hamlett was bishop ordinary until leaving the Anglican Catholic Church in 1997 to form the Holy Catholic Church Anglican Rite. The diocese was without a bishop until 2008 and was administered by episcopal visitors appointed by the metropolitan archbishop and a vicar general. The episcopal visitors were the Most Revd John T. Cahoon Jr. (1997–2001), the Most Revd Mark Haverland (2001–2004) and the Right Revd Rommie M. Starks (2004–2008).

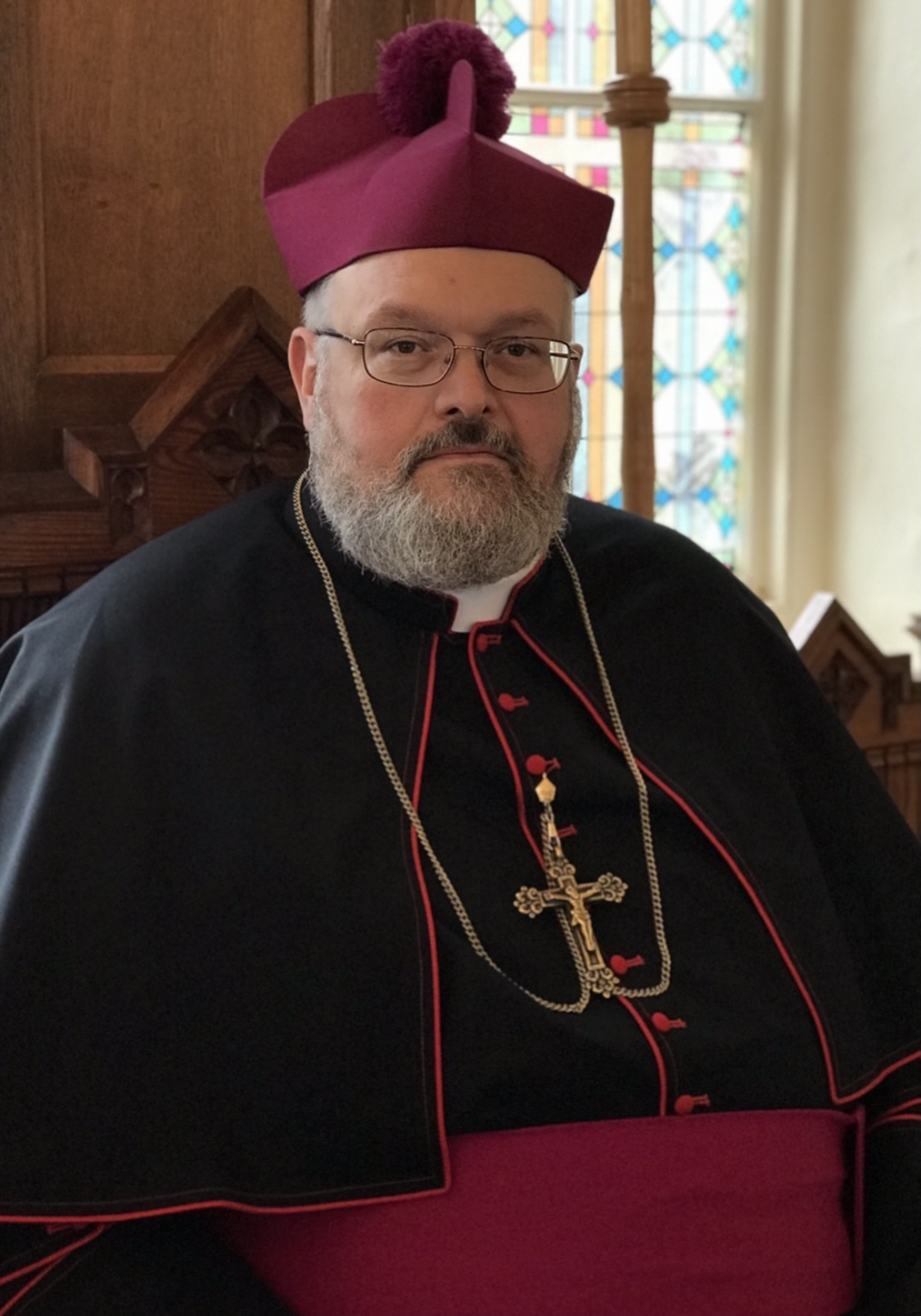
The Right Revd Damien Mead

In March 2008, the Revd Damien Mead was elected by the diocese to be the second bishop ordinary. Previously, Mead had been the vicar general. On 20 September 2008, he was consecrated as bishop by Starks (ACC Bishop of the Diocese of the Midwest, USA), the Right Revd Arthur Roger Dawson (ACC retired Bishop of Caracas, Venezuela) and the Right Revd Denis Ian Dermot Hodge (ACC Bishop of New Zealand).

Since 1998, it has been a registered charity in England and Wales (1068168).

== Organisation ==
The Diocese of the United Kingdom is governed by the constitution and statutes of the original province of the Anglican Catholic Church as well as its own diocesan canons.

The bishop ordinary is assisted by diocesan officers elected at annual synods as well as a council of advice.

== Ecumenical dialogue ==
As a part of the ACC dialogue with the Polish National Catholic Church, a member church of the Union of Scranton, meetings between the Nordic Catholic Church (an Old Catholic denomination of high church Lutheran patrimony) and the ACC Diocese of the United Kingdom were held in March 2019 and September of 2019 and again in February 2020.

In 2024, Bishop Damien Mead was presented with the Sant' Óscar Romero medal for ecumenism by the Sant' Óscar Romero Center in Capo d'Orlando.

== Locations ==
The diocese currently has four churches and missions in England and Wales.

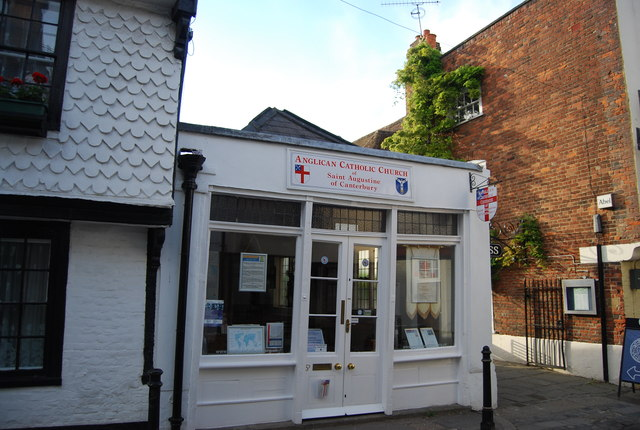
Church of Saint Augustine of Canterbury on Best Lane, Canterbury

The Pro-Cathedral of Saint Augustine of Canterbury had previously been located in Canterbury, but moved to its present location in the former Whitehill Methodist Chapel in Painters Forstal, Faversham, Kent, in 2017.

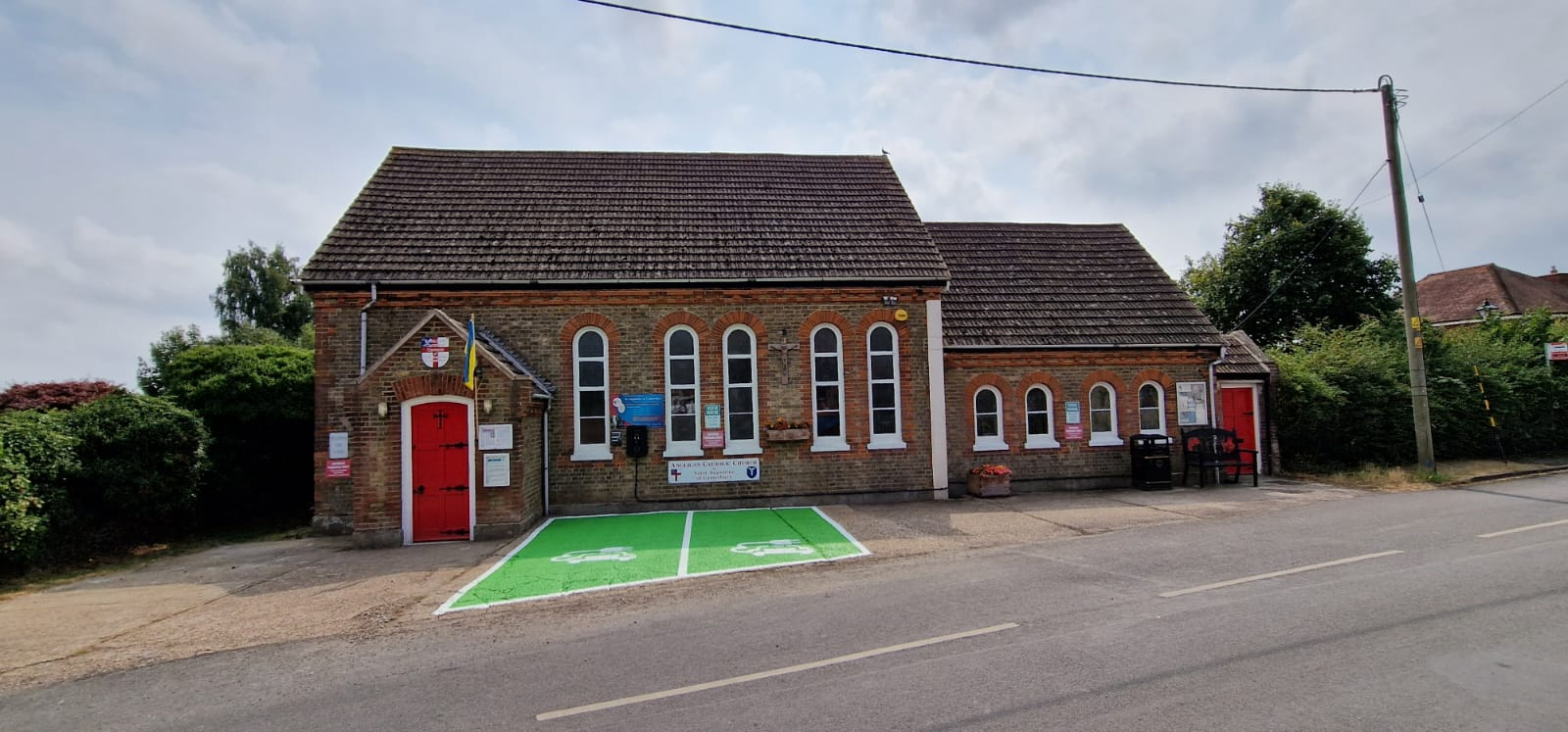
Church of Saint Augustine of Canterbury in Faversham

== Publications ==
The diocesan magazine, ACC-UK, is published twice a year. Books on religious topics and service books are also distributed through the diocese.
