= Alan Kenyon-Hoare =

American Continuing Anglican bishop

The Right Reverend Alan Kenyon-Hoare
- Bishop Ordinary of the Missionary Diocese of Southern Africa
- Church: Anglican Catholic Church
- Diocese: Missionary Diocese of Southern Africa
- In office: 2010–2015
- Other post(s): Vicar General of the Missionary Diocese of Southern Africa

Orders
- Consecration: 2010 by Mark Haverland

Alan Kenyon-Hoare was a Continuing Anglican bishop. He was Bishop Ordinary of the Missionary Diocese of Southern Africa in the Anglican Catholic Church since 7 November 2010 until 1 March 2015, when he resigned for health reasons. He died on 20 January 2021.

An Anglican Catholic Church priest, Kenyon-Hoare moved from the United States to South Africa, to work in their Missionary Diocese of Southern Africa. Kenyon-Hoare was the founder and he is the Rector of the Parish of the Holy Paraclete, in Edgemead, Cape Town, South Africa. He was nominated Vicar General, after the death of Innocent Nyoni, in July 2005.

He was consecrated Bishop Ordinary of the Missionary Diocese of Southern Africa on 7 October 2010 and enthroned on 7 November 2010.

In August 2013, in an article published in The Trinitarian, the official organ of his denomination, he declared the Presiding Bishop of the Episcopal Church of the United States to be anathema, having committed the sin of blasphemy against the Holy Spirit.
