= Anglican Catholic Church =

Continuing Anglican denomination

- Coat of arms of the Anglican Catholic Church
- Abbreviation: ACC
- Classification: Christian
- Orientation: Anglican
- Theology: Anglo-Catholicism
- Polity: Episcopal
- Metropolitan Archbishop: Mark Haverland
- Full communion: Anglican Province of America; Anglican Province of Christ the King; Anglican Church of India (CIPBC)
- Region: United States, Canada, Africa, Latin America, United Kingdom, Caribbean, Pakistan, Australia & New Zealand, Philippines
- Liturgy: Book of Common Prayer, 1928 edition
- Origin: 1977; St. Louis, Missouri, U.S.
- Separated from: the Episcopal Church in the United States and the Anglican Church of Canada
- Absorbed: Anglican Church in America. Diocese of the Holy Cross.
- Congregations: 300+ globally, 154+ in the United States
- Members: 35,000
- Official website: anglicancatholic.org

The Anglican Catholic Church (ACC), also known as the Anglican Catholic Church (Original Province), is a body of Christians in the continuing Anglican movement, which is separate from the Anglican Communion. This denomination is separate from the Anglican Catholic Church in Australia and the Anglican Catholic Church of Canada.

The continuing Anglican movement, including the Anglican Catholic Church, grew out of the 1977 Congress of St. Louis. Within historic Anglicanism the ACC sees itself as "rooted in a Catholic stream of faith and practice that embraces Henrician Catholicism, the theological method of Hooker and the Carolines, the piety and learning of Andrewes, the recovering liturgical practice of the Non-Jurors, the Oxford Movement, through the Ritualists, to modern Anglo-Catholicism."

== Name ==
"Anglican Catholic Church" had previously been considered as a possible alternative name for the Episcopal Church. What had provisionally been called the Anglican Church in North America (Episcopal) at the Congress of St. Louis was renamed the Anglican Catholic Church at the constitutional assembly in Denver, 18–21 October 1978. The name was registered with the US Patent Office in 1979.

According to the church, Anglican in this context simply means "English", while Catholic (meaning "universal") indicates that the church sees itself as part of the universal undivided church.

== History ==
The Congress of St. Louis was held in response to the Episcopal Church's revision of the Book of Common Prayer, which organizers felt abandoned a true commitment to both scripture and historical Anglicanism. The decision to allow the ordination of women was one part of a larger theological position opposed by the congress. As a result of the congress, various Anglicans separated from the Episcopal Church and formed the "Anglican Catholic Church" to continue the Anglican tradition as they understood it. Its adherents have therefore claimed that this church is the true heir of the Church of England in the United States.

The congress's statement of principles (the "Affirmation of St. Louis") summarized the new church's reason for being as follows:

... the Anglican Church of Canada and the Protestant Episcopal Church in the United States of America, by their unlawful attempts to alter Faith, Order and Morality (especially in their General Synod of 1975 and General Convention of 1976), have departed from Christ's One, Holy, Catholic and Apostolic Church.

In January 1978, four bishops (Charles Doren, James Orin Mote, Robert Morse, and Francis Watterson) were consecrated. The new church continued to appeal to disaffected Episcopalians to join. The Anglican Catholic Church created the missionary diocese of the Caribbean and New Granada in 1982, and consecrated Justo Pastor Ruiz, a former Episcopal priest, its first bishop.

Questions over jurisdiction and authority caused the church to be eventually divided. The Canadian parishes formed the Anglican Catholic Church of Canada, and American parishes formed three separate bodies, the Anglican Catholic Church, the United Episcopal Church of North America and the Diocese of Christ the King. In 1981, the Anglican Catholic Church had 8 dioceses and a missionary district, each with their own bishop, with around 200 congregations in 38 states. The number of members was estimated to be between 10,000 and 20,000 persons. In 1983, a statement of unity led to the coalescence of the Anglican Catholic Church. Those opposed to the newly organized church and the adoption of the Constitution and Canons that were drafted in 1978 in Dallas, left with Bishop Robert Harvey of the Diocese of the Southwest, among whom was Fr. Lester Kinsolving. In 1984 a portion of the Anglican Episcopal Church of North America which had not previously merged with the American Episcopal Church, including the bishops Walter Hollis Adams, Thomas Kleppinger, and Robert G. Wilkes, merged with the ACC to become the non-geographical Diocese of St. Paul. In 1986, Adams and some congregations left the ACC and reconstituted the Anglican Episcopal Church of North America.

In 1988 the church reported 12,000 members, with 200 parishes and priests, in the United States. Worldwide membership included an additional 8,000 members. In addition to the eight dioceses in the United States, there were missionary dioceses in Australia, South Africa, Columbia, and the United Kingdom. At the 1989 Provincial Synod, Archbishop Louis Falk proposed that the Anglican Catholic Church become a worldwide traditional alternative to the Anglican Communion. In 1990, the ACC was reported to have 10 dioceses, 14 bishops and 200 U.S. congregations serving 20,000 people.

Due to resistance to aspects of Falk's plan, in 1991 a number of parishes left the Anglican Catholic Church to merge with the American Episcopal Church and form the Anglican Church in America, and Falk left the ACC to become primate of the newly formed Traditional Anglican Communion. In 1997 additional parishes and five bishops left and formed the Holy Catholic Church (Anglican Rite).

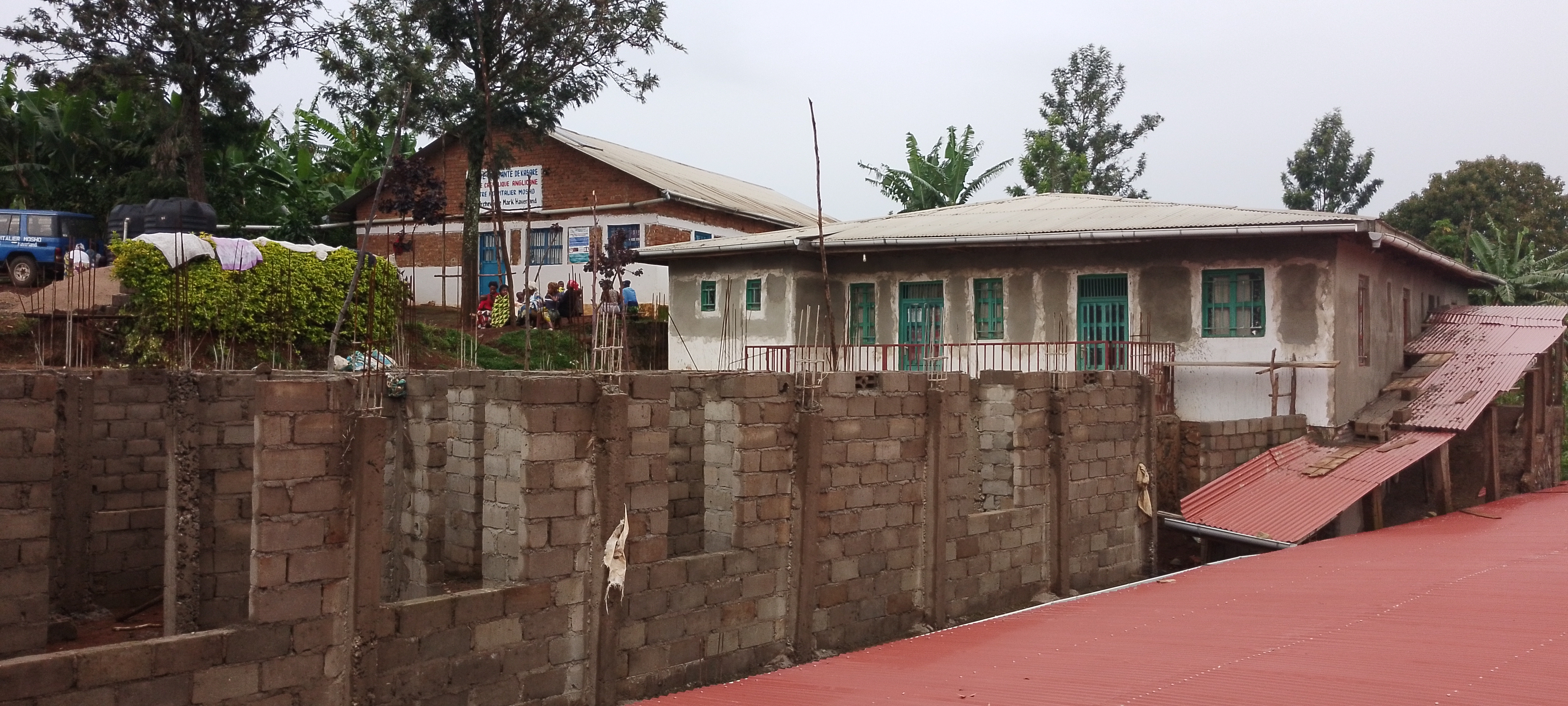
Archbishop Mark Haverland Hospital Centre in Mosho, DRC, a charitable institution built with funds from the ACC

Since 1990 the Anglican Catholic Church has expanded to six continents and nearly two dozen countries, including the Americas, the United Kingdom, Australia, and Africa, so that today the Anglican Catholic Church has over 250 parish churches and missions worldwide, and at the end of 2015 the membership of the Original Province was counted as 30,711. Worldwide mission and development is done through the St. Paul Mission Society, which was founded to "provide funding, personnel, and other forms of support for domestic and international missions," and to assist in "the amelioration, relief, and assistance of persons and communities distressed by natural or man-made events or disasters or by adverse social or political situations." Based in the US, the main focus of the Society is in the developing world. At Provincial Synod, October 2007, Wilson Garang and his Diocese of Aweil in Sudan were received into the Anglican Catholic Church. In 2015, the number of ACC dioceses in South Africa grew to four. At the 24th Provincial Synod, in September 2021, a new province, the province of South Africa, was canonically erected. In 2024, the ACC expanded into Tanzania. Archbishop Haverland installed Bp. Kutta as the first ACC bishop in Tanzania on September 15, 2024.

In October 2005 Mark Haverland of Athens, Georgia, replaced John Vockler, who was in charge from 2001 to 2005, as archbishop and metropolitan. In 2017 the ACC signed the Atlanta Concordat with the Anglican Church in America, the Anglican Province of America, and the Diocese of the Holy Cross forming the "G4." At the Provincial Synod in September 2021, the Diocese of the Holy Cross voted to join the ACC as a non-geographical diocese.

In January 2025, the Anglican Catholic Church received international media attention when it decided to remove Fr. Calvin Robinson from active ministry. This decision followed a controversial gesture made by Robinson at the 2025 National Pro-Life Summit. Robinson had moved to the United States in September 2024 to serve as Priest-in-Charge of an ACC parish in Grand Rapids, Michigan. The ACC released a statement indicating that Robinson's license was revoked due to his engagement in online trolling and other behaviors deemed incompatible with the priesthood. Following extensive media coverage, the ACC issued a follow-up statement clarifying that Robinson had not been "defrocked" in the sense of being deposed from the priesthood, but was at liberty to seek alternative ecclesial membership.

=== Ecumenical relations and relations with other Anglican jurisdictions ===
==== ACC-APCK-UECNA-ACA ====
From 2005 to 2011, the ACC and the United Episcopal Church of North America (UECNA) explored opportunities for greater cooperation and the possibility of achieving organic unity. On May 17, 2007, Archbishop Haverland signed an inter-communion agreement negotiated with the United Episcopal Church of North America. In July, Archbishop Haverland published a statement on church unity, calling on UECNA and the Anglican Province of Christ the King (APCK) to join him in building "full organic unity." Bishop Presley Hutchens of the ACC addressed delegates to the UECNA convention of October 2008 and discussed the possibility of uniting the ACC and UECNA. Although well received at the time, there was a feeling among many of the delegates that the proposal was being rushed, and that no proper consideration was being given to the theological, constitutional, and canonical issues thrown up by the move. In January 2009 one bishop from each jurisdiction consecrated three suffragan bishops in St. Louis, intending that they serve all three jurisdictions. Moves towards unity with the Anglican Catholic Church were referred for further discussion and subsequently stalled in 2011 by the decision of UECNA to remain an independent jurisdiction.

The ACA voted to merge with the ACC on June 6, 2025.

On August 1, 2025, the ACC ended intercommunion with the UECNA due to doctrinal differences around the Affirmation of St. Louis and the Anglican Formularies.

==== GAFCON and ACNA ====
In 2008, Archbishop Mark Haverland published a response to the 2008 meeting of Global Anglican Future Conference (GAFCON) in Jerusalem, which states "GAFCON produced a now widely published statement which does not address the innovations that led to the formation of our own Continuing Church in 1976-8: namely the "ordination of women," a new and radical Prayer Book, and a pro-abortion policy." The response concludes:

We call upon all self-described Anglicans to reject clearly and decisively all of the liturgical, moral, and theological errors of recent years, beginning with the ordination of women. We call upon all self-described Anglicans to return to the central Tradition of Christendom and to recognize that evangelical and neo-Pentecostalist Protestantism is no safe haven. We welcome GAFCON as a small step in the right direction. But we confidently predict that the ambiguities and silences that characterize its statement will lead rapidly to fragmentation and confusion without any countervailing theological achievement. The only issue addressed in a somewhat adequate fashion by GAFCON is homosexuality. Far more is at stake.

In 2009, Archbishop Mark Haverland published a letter to Bishop Robert Duncan, concerning the invitation to participate in the inaugural provincial assembly of the Anglican Church in North America on June 22–25, 2009. The letter indicates that the differences between the ACC and ACNA are "first principles" which do not allow unity, but offers a dialogue in the future if those "first principles" are resolved. In December 2012, Archbishop Mark Haverland, together with the Rt. Rev. Paul Hewett (Diocese of the Holy Cross), the Most Rev. Walter Grundorf (Anglican Province of America), the Most Rev. Brian Marsh (Anglican Church in America), and the Most Rev. Peter D. Robinson (United Episcopal Church of North America) published a joint open letter to ACNA titled "An Appeal from the Continuing Anglican Churches to the ACNA and Associated Churches" which called for ACNA to re-examine the post-1976 innovations they have accepted:

We call upon ACNA to heed our call to return to your classical Anglican roots.We commend to your prayerful attention the Affirmation of Saint Louis, which we firmly believe provides a sound basis for a renewed and fulfilled Anglicanism on our continent. We urge you to heed the call of Metropolitan Jonah, whose concerns we share. Anglicanism in North America cannot be both united and orthodox on a partially revolutionized basis. We call upon you to repudiate firmly any claim to alter doctrine or order against the consensus of the Catholic and Orthodox world. We call upon you to embrace the classical Prayer Book tradition.

==== Personal Ordinariate of the Chair of Saint Peter ====
In 2009, Archbishop Mark Haverland published a response to Rome's announcement of the erection of the Personal Ordinariate of the Chair of Saint Peter. The response states that it "does not mark in any respect an ecumenical advance" and that as it provides only for "relatively one-sided conversions of former Anglicans with minimal concessions, we fear that the Note and Constitution in fact will harm and retard genuine ecumenical progress" and concludes:

We hope eventually for a genuine dialogue concerning the Petrine Office and long for the day when we, with our Orthodox and Oriental Christian friends, may again find in the successor of Saint Peter a patriarch with the primacy of honor and with high authority both as an organ for strengthening the Church's unity and also as an instrument for the articulation of the Church's teaching. We regret that the forthcoming Constitution, while kindly meant, seems set to delay that happy day.

Archbishop Haverland later characterized the concessions to Anglicans as "trivial" as they were policies that already existed in the Pastoral Provision, without addressing key theological concerns. He stated that the offer may attract Anglicans unhappy in their current churches rather than traditional Anglicans, and viewed the lack of interest in the papal offer among ACC members as a sign of their stability and commitment to their faith.

Other clergy of the ACC also wrote critically of Anglicanorum Coetibus.

==== Anglican Joint Synod ====
The Anglican Catholic Church invited representatives from the Anglican Province of America, the Anglican Church in America, the Diocese of the Holy Cross and the Reformed Episcopal Church to its 2015 Provincial Synod. In January 2016, the Anglican Catholic Church reached a formal accord with the Anglican Church in America, the Anglican Province of America, and the Diocese of the Holy Cross. Forming the Anglican Joint Synod, a "Group of 4" churches, called the G-4, pursuing eventual corporate unity.

On October 6, 2017, at a joint synod in Atlanta, Georgia, the primates of the Anglican Province of America, the Anglican Church in America, the Anglican Catholic Church, and the Diocese of the Holy Cross signed a concordat of full communion. The Most Rev. Brian R. Marsh (ACA), the Most Rev. Mark Haverland (ACC), the Most Rev. Walter H. Grundorf (APA), and the Rt. Rev. Paul C. Hewett (DHC) signed the following document, called the Atlanta Concordat, which reads in part:

We acknowledge each other to be orthodox and catholic Anglicans in virtue of our common adherence to the authorities accepted by and summarized in the Affirmation of St. Louis in the faith of the Holy Tradition of the undivided Catholic Church and of the seven Ecumenical Councils. We recognize in each other in all essentials the same faith; the same sacraments; the same moral teaching; and the same worship; likewise, we recognize in each other the same Holy Orders of bishops, priests, and deacons in the same Apostolic Succession, insofar as we all share the episcopate conveyed to the Continuing Churches in Denver in January 1978 in response to the call of the Congress of Saint Louis; therefore, We welcome members of all of our Churches to Holy Communion and parochial life in any and all of the congregations of our Churches; and, We pledge to pursue full, institutional, and organic union with each other, in a manner that respects tender consciences, builds consensus and harmony, and fulfills increasingly our Lord's will that His Church be united; and, We pledge also to seek unity with other Christians, including those who understand themselves to be Anglican, insofar as such unity is consistent with the essentials of Catholic faith, order, and moral teaching.

Kevin Kallsen of Anglican TV Ministries interviewed the G-4 bishops, the Most Rev. Brian R. Marsh (ACA), the Most Rev. Mark Haverland (ACC), the Most Rev. Walter H. Grundorf (APA), and the Rt. Rev. Paul C. Hewett (DHC), on October 9, 2017, concerning the recently signed concordat.

In 2019, a joint mission and evangelism ministry called Continuing Forward was formed for these G-4 jurisdictions.

On September 23, 2021, the Diocese of the Holy Cross voted to join the Anglican Catholic Church as a non-geographical diocese, making the "Group of 4" a "Group of 3" (G-3) churches. The Anglican Joint synods further consolidated on October 15, 2025, when the Anglican Church in America merged into the Anglican Catholic Church, resulting in the Joint Synods being a Communion of two Churches.

==== Dialogue with the Polish National Catholic Church ====
A dialogue between the G-3 (at the time, G-4) churches and the Polish National Catholic Church (PNCC) was opened, resulting from the desire to restore the kind of intercommunion that the PNCC had shared with the Protestant Episcopal Church in the United States before 1978. The meetings began after representatives of the PNCC were invited to attend the Anglican Joint Synods of the G-4 in 2017.

The first official dialogue was held January 15, 2019, in Dunwoody, Georgia. The jurisdictions of the G-4 were represented by their presiding bishops and archbishops from the Anglican Catholic Church, the Anglican Church in America, the Anglican Province of America, and the Diocese of the Holy Cross. Also in attendance was a bishop of the Anglican Catholic Church of Canada (ACCC). The PNCC was represented by three bishops, including Prime Bishop Anthony Mikovsky and Bishop Paul Sobiechowski, and two senior priests. Annual meetings between these churches have continued, and G-3 representatives were also in attendance with the bishops of the PNCC at the 125th anniversary and General Synod of the Polish National Catholic Church in Scranton, Pennsylvania.

==== Dialogue with the Nordic Catholic Church ====
As a part of the ACC's worldwide efforts with the Union of Scranton, meetings have been held between the ACC Diocese of the United Kingdom and the Nordic Catholic Church, an Old Catholic denomination of High Church Lutheran patrimony.

== Church governance ==
The Anglican Catholic Church holds to the Affirmation of St. Louis as a guiding document of faith and ecclesiology. It is further organized and governed according to the principles and terms laid out in its constitution and canons. In the Constitution, the church receives its name and it ecclesiastical structure. The method for establishing dioceses and provinces is established, and various processes related to the election of bishops and calling synods are laid out. The canons are an expansion of the principles laid out in the Constitution and provide a detailed legal framework for the governance of the church. The Original Province is further governed by its own canons and statutes. Each diocese is also governed by its own diocesan canons.

The polity of the ACC is episcopal and synodal. Regular synods are scheduled in the canons, with voting in joint sessions as well as separate sessions of the House of Clergy and House of Laity. The administration of each province and diocese includes appointed and elected officers, such as chancellor, treasurer, secretary, and judges of canonical courts, most of whom may be laity.

The Colleges of Bishops, under the presidency of the metropolitan, are in charge of the government and administration of the provinces of the Anglican Catholic Church. They are also responsible for the promulgation of official teaching and the instruction of the faithful. The colleges are composed of all bishops of the Provinces, active and retired, as well as any suffragans or coadjutors. The College of Bishops is responsible for overseeing administrative departments, each headed by a bishop and charged with a specific mission within the church. There are currently seven such departments in the Original Province.

- The Department of Ecumenical Relations (The Most Reverend Mark Haverland)
- The Department of Ministry (The Right Reverend Damien Mead)
- The Department of Theological Education (The Right Reverend Presley Hutchens)
- The Department of the Armed Forces (The Right Reverend Donald Lerow)
- The Department of Evangelism (The Right Reverend Stephen Scarlett)
- The Department of Stewardship (currently vacant)
- The Department of Multi-Lingual Resources (currently vacant)

== Sacraments and worship ==
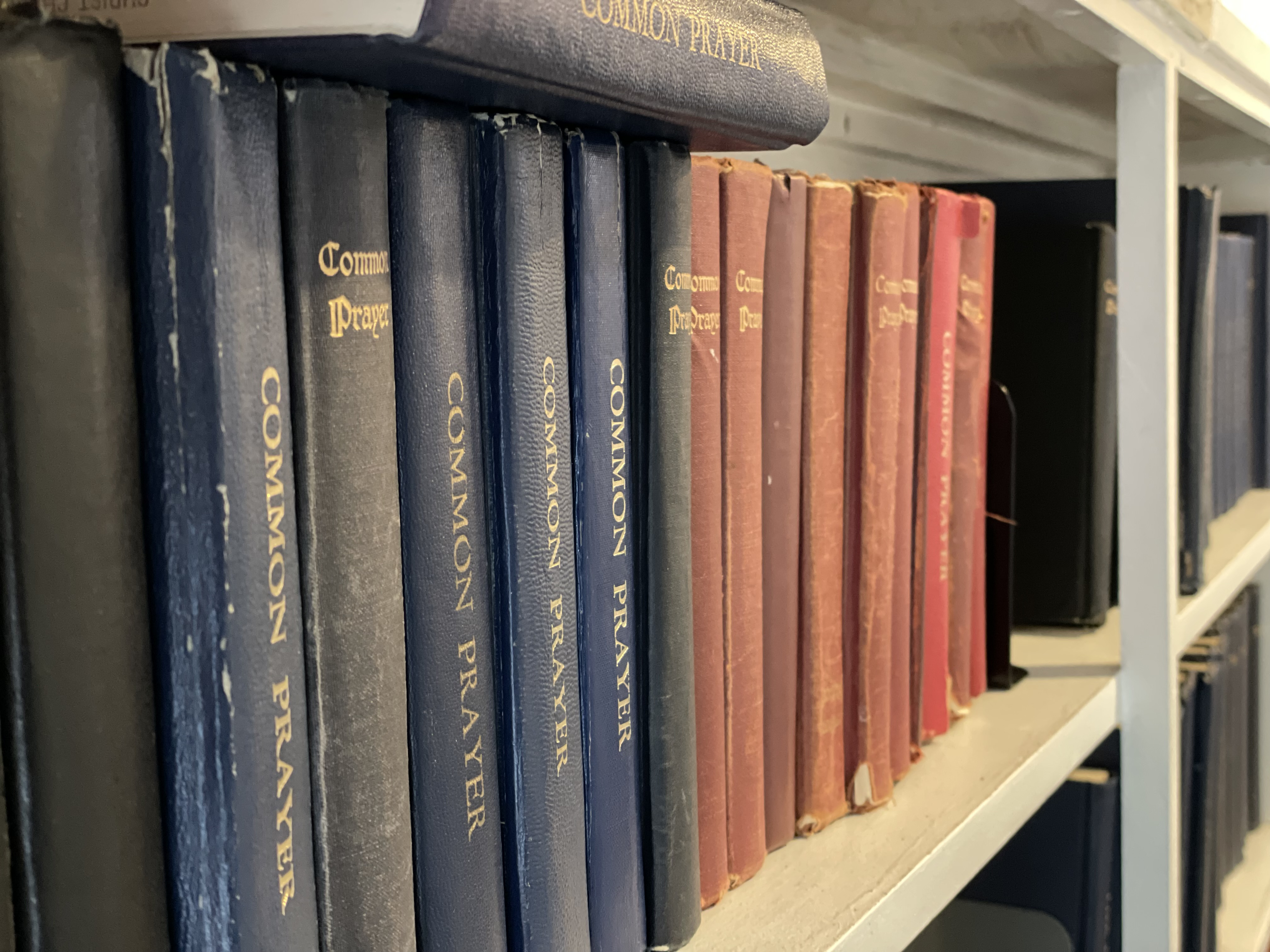
Copies of the 1928 prayer book at an Anglican Catholic Church parish.

The ACC holds to seven sacraments, "The Sacraments of Baptism, Confirmation, the Holy Eucharist, Holy Matrimony, Holy Orders, Penance, and Unction of the Sick, [are] objective and effective signs of the continued presence and saving activity of Christ our Lord among His people and as His covenanted means for conveying His grace." Following the principles outlined in the Affirmation of St. Louis, the ACC holds to a high eucharistic theology, allowing reservation, adoration, Benediction, and Corpus Christi processions as "logical and godly extension of the facts of the objective and salvific Real Presence of Jesus Christ, God the Son, in and through his sacramental Body and Blood."

The celebration of the Eucharistic service is directed to be the norm for Sunday worship. The Constitution of the ACC further instructs that liturgical services may be celebrated from:

The Book of Common Prayer in its 1549 English, 1928 American, 1954 South African, and 1962 Canadian editions, and the 1963 edition of the Church of India, Pakistan, Burma, and Ceylon as well as The Supplement To The Book of Common Prayer (C.I.P.B.C.) of 1960 shall be the Standard of Public Worship of this Church, together with The Anglican Missal, The American Missal, The English Missal, and other missals and devotional manuals, based on and conforming to those editions of The Book of Common Prayer. The Book of Common Praise of 1938 (Canada), The Hymnal, 1940, and The English Hymnal (New Edition, 1933) should be the primary musical standard for Public Worship.

The Ordinal contained in the accepted prayerbooks are used for the ordination of sacred ministers. In 1994, a proposed amendment to permit the use of the 1662 Book of Common Prayer failed to pass all three houses at the Provincial Synod, on the grounds that the Black Rubric allowed a receptionist view of the Eucharist. Following the rubrics common to liturgical practice before the 1979 Book of Common Prayer, as well as the rubrics of the allowed Missals, liturgical celebration in the ACC follows a usus antiquior form of worship, including the ad orientem posture of the celebrant and the frequent use of communion rails. Following Anglican custom, communion is usually given to the laity under both kinds. The Ornaments Rubric is retained and permitted.

The ACC publishes an annual Ordo Calendar, which provides a standard for feasts, fasts, and general rubrics for liturgical services. The Ordo Calendar generally follows pre-1969 traditions with Anglican adaptations and makes provision for local Anglican feasts.

== Doctrine ==
In addition to the dogmatic theology expressed in the Affirmation of St. Louis, the ACC expressly follows classical Anglo-Catholic theology. The Apostles' Creed, the Nicene Creed (with the restoration of the word "Holy") and the Athanasian Creed are accepted as binding expressions of Christian dogma. The filioque is recognized as a later addition, open to non-orthodox interpretation, and an obstacle between the ACC and the Eastern Orthodox. The Virgin Birth and the title of Theotokos as expressed at the Council of Ephesus are considered biblically founded dogmas. Other Marian beliefs, such as Perpetual Virginity, the New Eve, the Assumption, and the Immaculate Conception are considered to be widely held theological views consistent with the faith and are liturgically celebrated. The term "mediatrix of all graces" is rejected as novel and open to misinterpretation, though the intercession of Mary and the practice of Marian devotions is affirmed. The prayers of the saints in heaven to assist the faithful on earth is affirmed, as well as the practice of requesting those prayers from the saints. Purgatory as a particular state or place is considered speculative, though prayers for the dead are allowed as efficacious. The Eucharist is understood as a sacrifice, re-presenting Christ's death, in which Christ is truly present and gives grace. Good deeds are not considered to earn salvation, but are instead "a natural response to God's free and unelicited gift of grace to man in Christ." God gives grace freely, with which God's people are called to cooperate by a godly, righteous, and sober life. The XXXIX Articles are not considered to have normative, independent authority on matters of doctrine or practice, but are believed to be in line with Catholic and Apostolic doctrine when rightly interpreted.

== Morals and ethics ==
The Anglican Catholic Church believes in the sanctity of human life. The archbishop of the ACC, Mark Haverland, authored academic articles on bioethics, particularly end-of-life issues. He signed the Statement Opposing Brain Death Criteria released by Citizens United Resisting Euthanasia. At the 2019 Anglican Joint Synods, the ACC along with the other G-4 churches, released a joint proclamation on abortion in response to the Reproductive Health Act that had been passed by the New York State legislature earlier that year. The proclamation affirms a right to life as given by natural law, and calls for evangelistic action to curtail abortion laws through prayer and support for crisis pregnancy centers.

The ACC holds that sexual acts are licit and moral only within monogamous heterosexual marriage. A homosexual orientation is defined as objectively disordered but not subjectively sinful. Marriage, as one of the seven sacraments, is held to be an indissoluble union between a man and a woman for the purposes of mutual comfort and the procreation of children. At the provincial synod in 2015 the canons of the ACC were modified to clarify that marriage was defined as a permanent and life-long union between a natural man and a natural woman, and to protect parishes and priests from possible litigation from the refusal to host or perform a wedding for anyone other than a natural man and a natural woman.

== Original Province ==
The original organizational structure of the Anglican Catholic Church was as a single province, now called Original Province. All dioceses of the province meet biennially in a provincial synod.

=== Synods of the Original Province ===
No.	City	Year	Dates
I	Dallas, Texas	1978	October 19–21
II	Indianapolis, Indiana	1979	October 18–20
III	Mobile, Alabama	1980	October 22–25
IV	Kansas City, Missouri	1982	June 9–12
V	Orlando, Florida	1983	October 17–20
VI	Cincinnati, Ohio	1985	October 8–11
VII	New Orleans, Louisiana	1987	September 30 - October 2
VIII	Denver, Colorado	1989	October 2–6
IX	Charlotte, North Carolina	1991	September 18–20
X	Kansas City, Missouri	1993	September 29 - October 1
XI	San Mateo, California	1995	September 27–29
XII	Norfolk, Virginia	1997	October 13–17
XIII	Indianapolis, Indiana	1999	October 20–22
XIV	Denver, Colorado	2001	October 22–24
XV	New Orleans, Louisiana	2003	October 22–24
XVI	Grand Rapids, Michigan	2005	October 26–27
XVII	Cleveland, Ohio	2007	October 10–11
XVIII	Richmond, Virginia	2009	October 28–30
XIX	Palm Beach, Florida	2011	October 5–7
XX	Newport Beach, California	2013	October 23–24
XXI	Athens, Georgia	2015	October 28–29
XXII	Atlanta, Georgia	2017	October 4–5
XXIII	Atlanta, Georgia	2019	January 16–17, 2020
XXIV	Athens, Georgia	2021	September 22–23
XXV	Orlando, Florida	2023	October 9–13
XXVI	Charleston, South Carolina	2025	October 13–17

=== Dioceses of the Original Province ===
==== Dioceses in the Americas ====
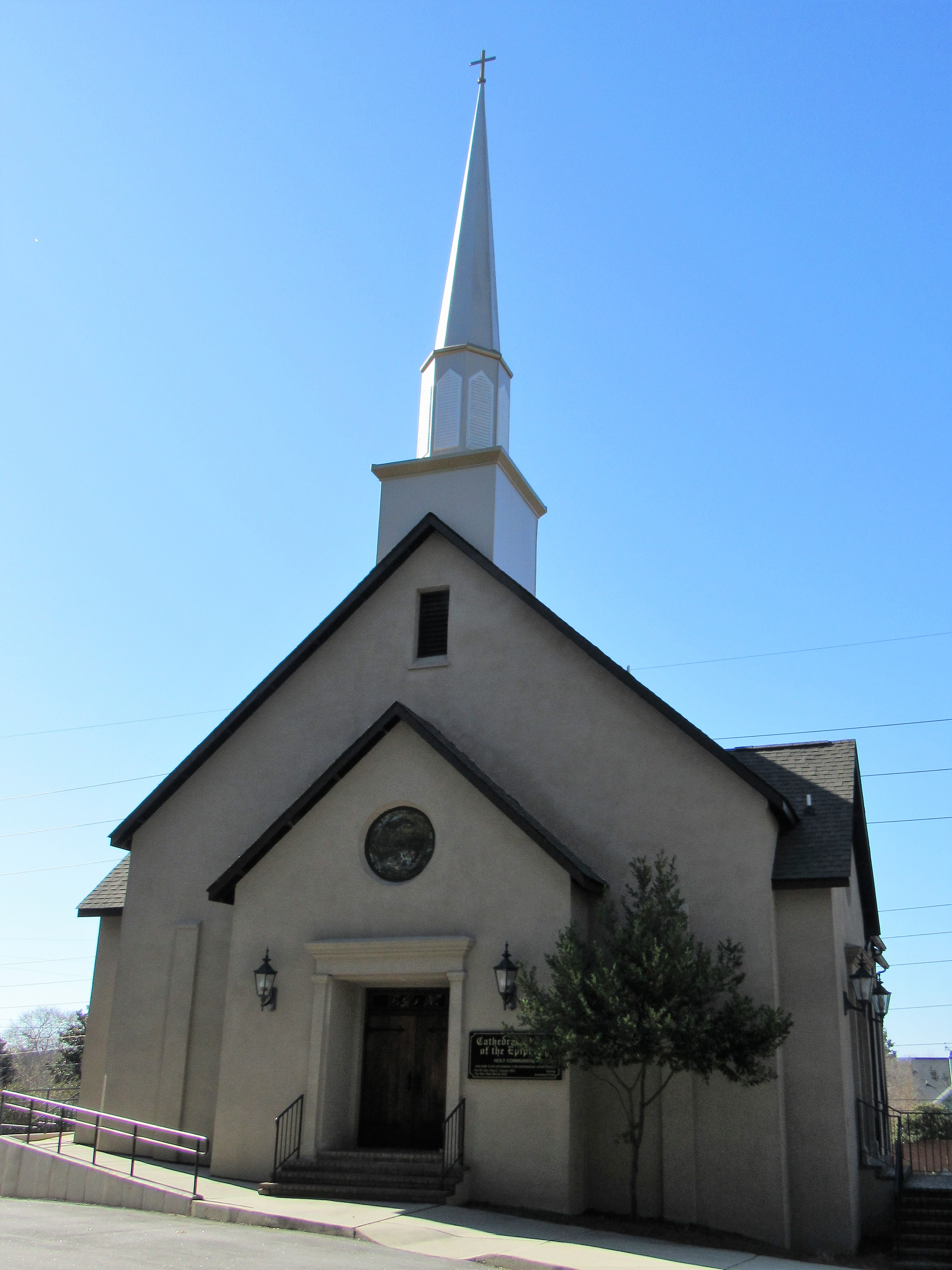
- Cathedral Church of the Epiphany in Columbia, South Carolina. It is the cathedral church of the Diocese of the Holy Cross
  Diocese of the Holy Cross
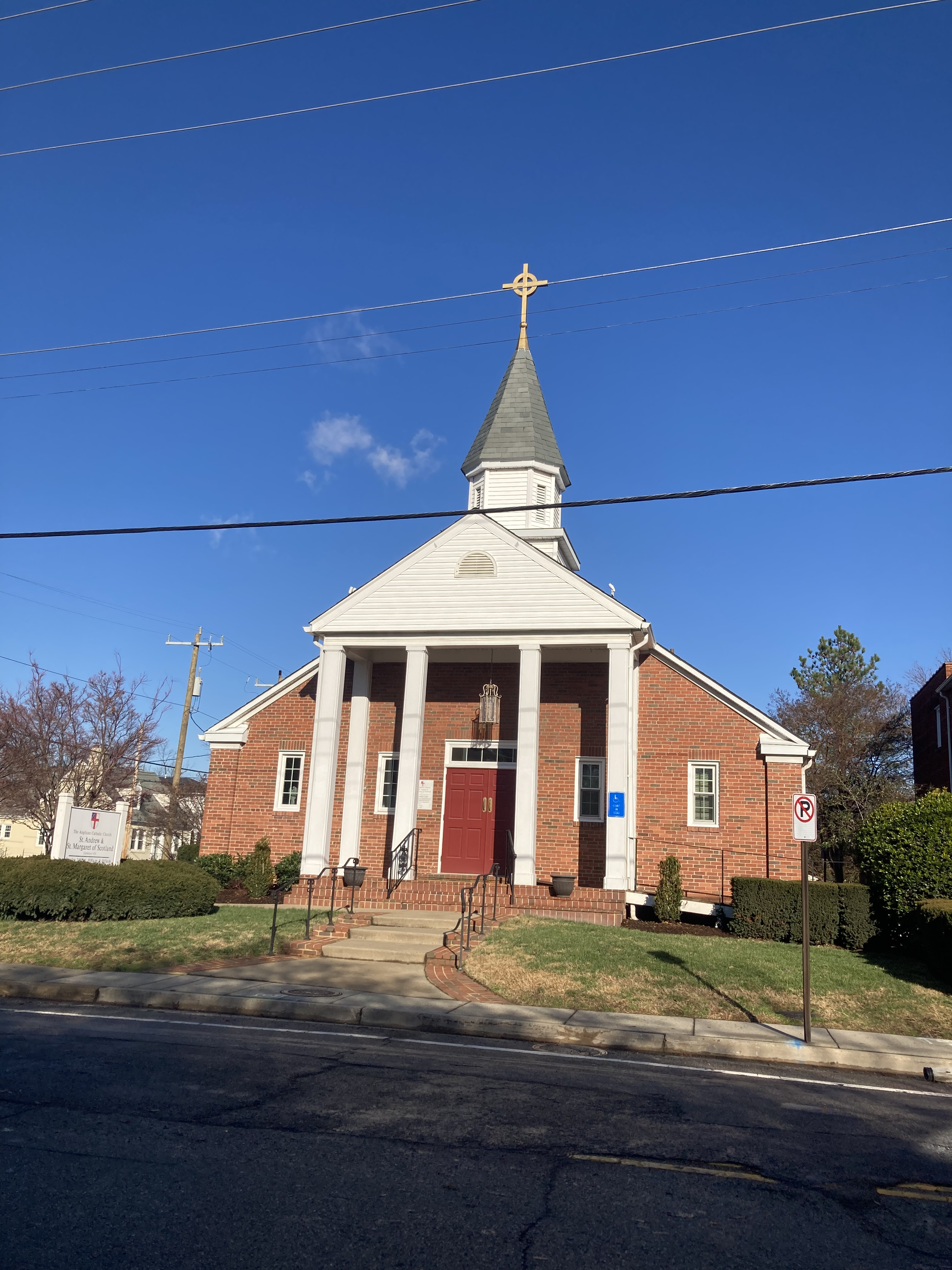
- The Anglican Catholic Church of St. Andrew and St. Margaret of Scotland in Alexandria, Virginia, a parish of the Diocese of the Mid-Atlantic States
  Diocese of the Mid-Atlantic States
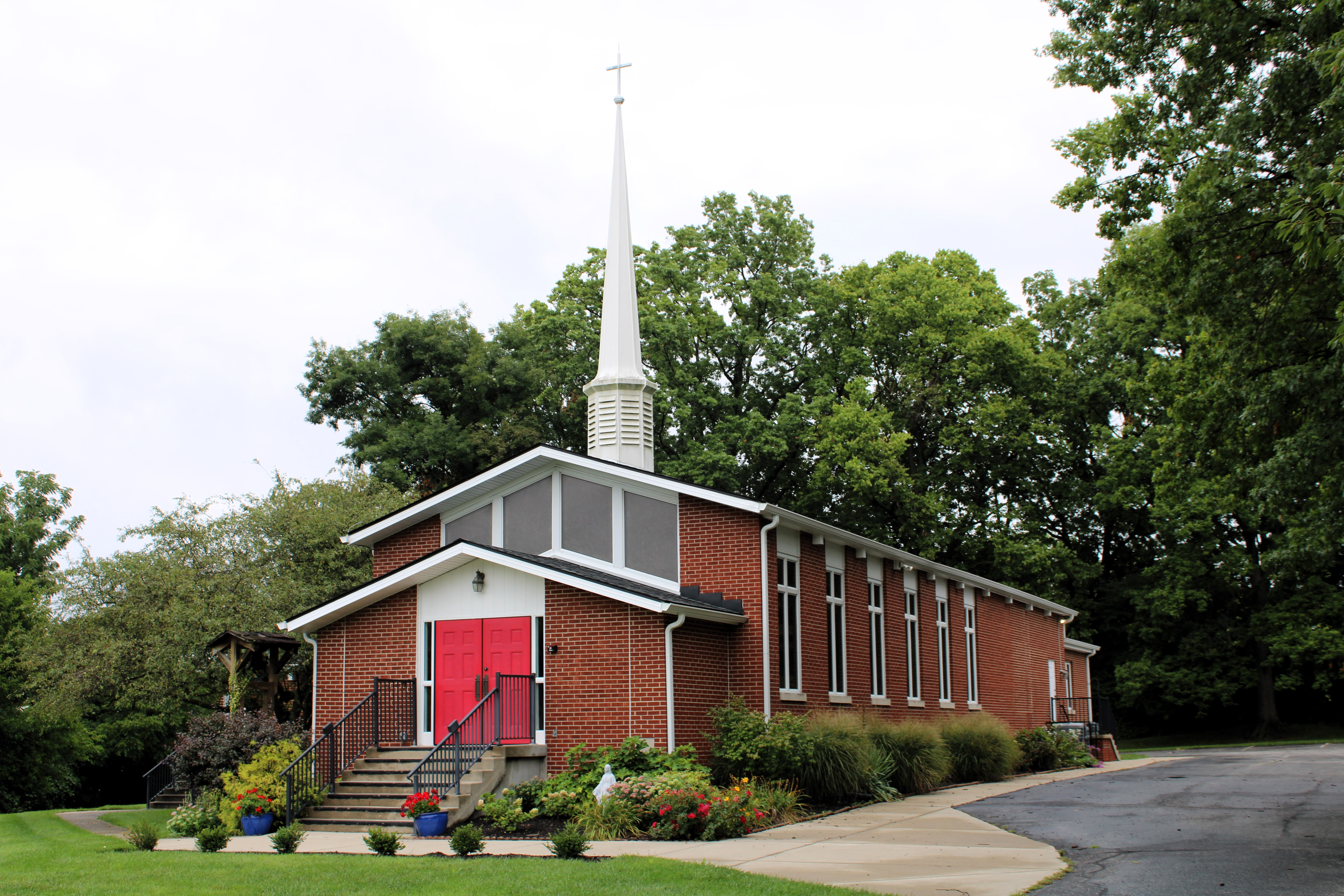
- St. Edward the Confessor Anglican Church in Indianapolis, Indiana. It is the cathedral church of Diocese of the Midwest
  Diocese of the Midwest
- Diocese of New Orleans
- Diocese of the Holy Trinity
- Diocese of the Northeast
- Diocese of the Resurrection
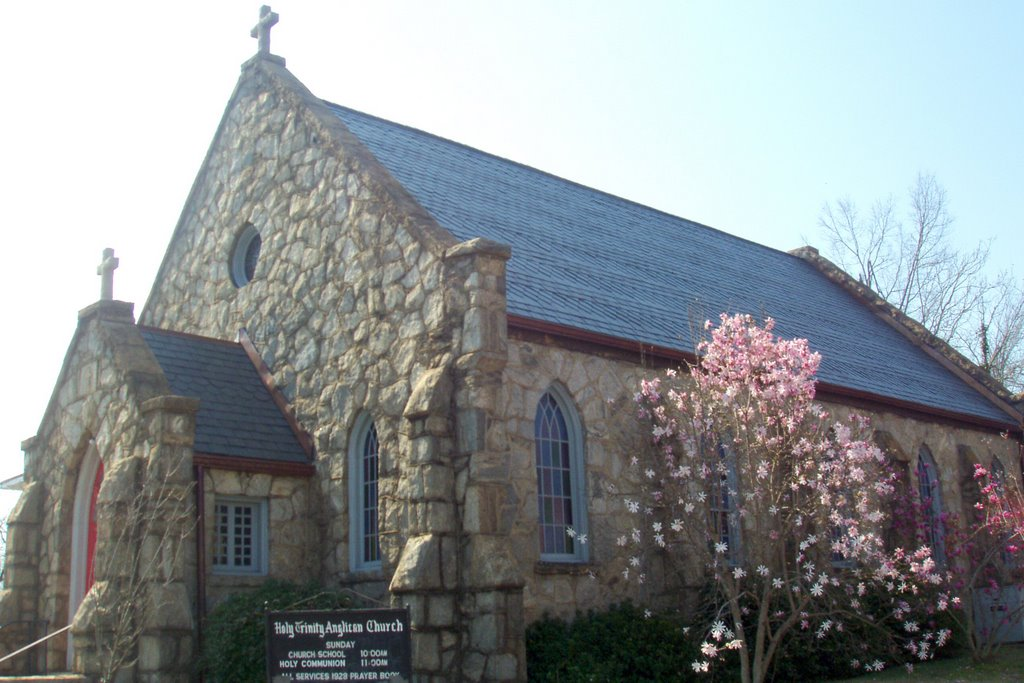
- Holy Trinity Anglican Church in Greenville, SC, a parish of the Diocese of South
  Diocese of the South
- Diocese of the New Grenada (Colombia, Venezuela, Chile and Brazil)
- Diocese of the West
- Anglican Diocese of the Eastern United States
- St. John's Cathedral in Quincy, Illinois. It is the cathedral church of Diocese of Missouri Valley
  Diocese of the Missouri Valley
- Diocese of the Caribbean
- Missionary District of Canada

==== Dioceses in Europe ====
- Diocese of the United Kingdom
- Deanery of Europe

==== Dioceses in Oceania ====
- Missionary Diocese of Australia and New Zealand
- Diocese of the Philippines
- Diocese of Mindanao

==== Dioceses in Africa ====
- Diocese of Kenya
- Diocese of Cameroon
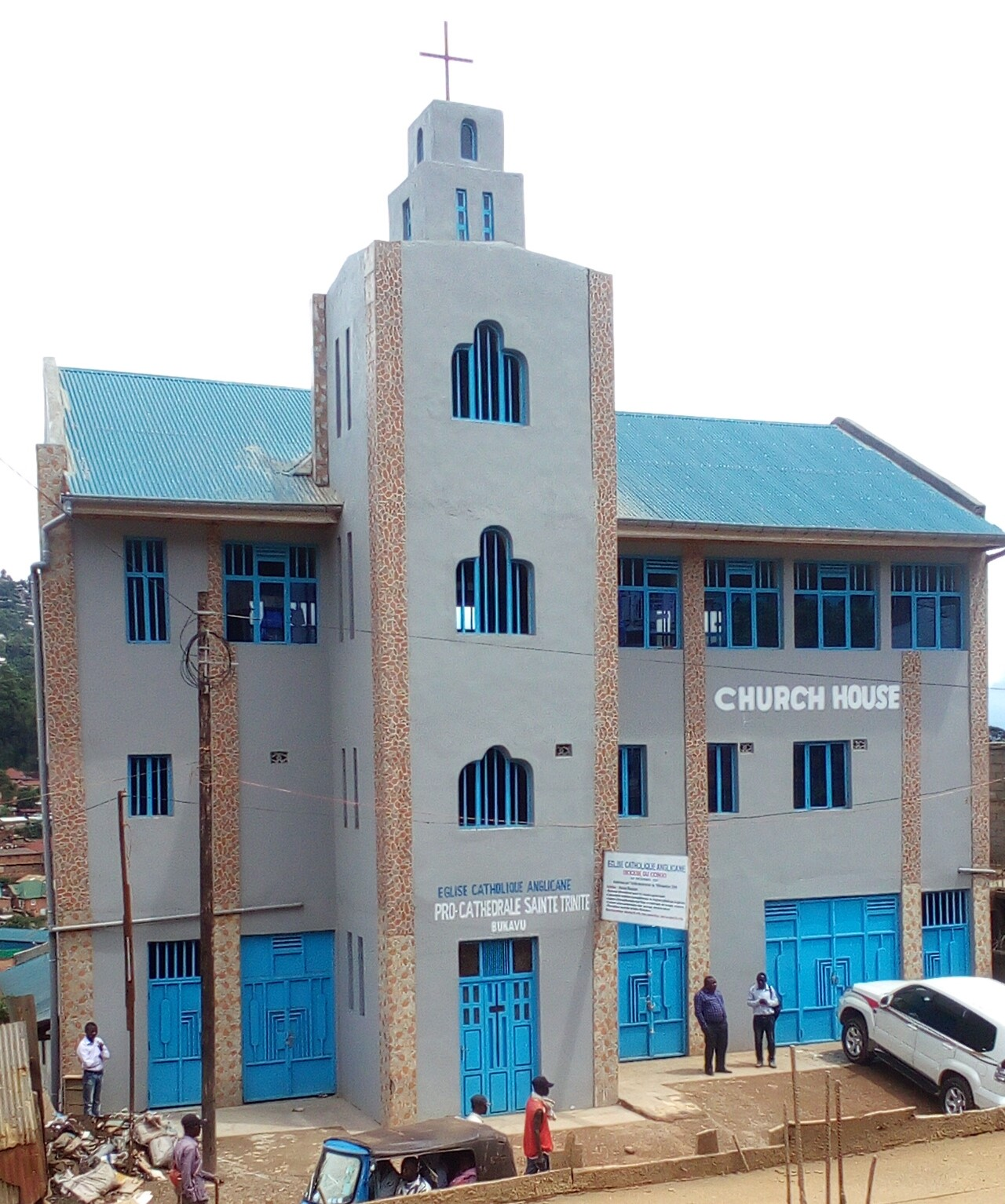
- Pro-Cathedral Sainte Trinité Bukavu and Vocational Training Centre with Conference Room, in Bukavu, Democratic Republic of Congo. It is the cathedral church of the Diocese of Congo
  Diocese of Congo (South Kivu (exclusive Fizi, Uvira and Mwenga), North Kivu, Central, West, North and South)
- Missionary Diocese of Eastern Congo (Fizi, Uvira and Mwenga)
- Missionary Diocese of Rwanda
- Diocese of the Aweil (South Sudan)
- Missionary Diocese of the West (South Africa)
- Diocese of Christ the Redeemer (South Africa). Previously Umzi wase Tiyopiya - Ityalike yomdibaniso.

== Second Province ==
In 1984 the five dioceses of the Church of India (CIBC) were received by the Anglican Catholic Church and constituted as its second province, but they rescinded communion between 2013 and 2017 over matters relating to the status of the second province and became independent. In 2018, Archbishop Mark Haverland and the Most Rev. John Augustine, Metropolitan of the CIPBC, signed an agreement restoring communio in sacris. The Second Province of the ACC now consists of one diocese:

- Diocese of Lahore

== Third Province ==
The Missionary Diocese of Southern Africa (ACC) was established in 2005. In September 2021, by a vote of the Provincial Synod of the Original Province, a third Province, the Province of Southern Africa, was established. The Right Reverend Dominic Mdunyelwa was elected as its first Archbishop and Metropolitan and was installed by Archbishop Mark Haverland on November 14, 2021. Additionally, the Diocese of Umzi Wase Tiyopiya and Rt. Rev. Siviwe Samuel Maqoma were accepted into the newly created province and renamed the Diocese of Christ the King. The newly autonomous Province was composed of 5 dioceses in South Africa, and the one and only diocese in Zimbabwe. The 2 remaining dioceses in South Africa voted to remain part of the Original Province. In 2023, the Province raised the Patrimony of Johannesburg to a diocese, bringing the number of dioceses to 7. The Province consists of the following dioceses:

- Diocese of Kei
- Missionary Diocese of Ekurhuleni
- Missionary Diocese of Saint Paul
- Missionary Diocese of Vaal
- Missionary Diocese of Johannesburg
- Diocese of Christ the King
- Diocese of Zimbabwe
- Diocese of Port Elizabeth
- Diocese of East London
- Missionary Diocese of Qumbu
- Diocese of Tanzania
- Patrimony of the North West (South Africa)
- Patrimony of the Western Cape

== Leadership ==
See: Episcopal succession in the Anglican Catholic Church

The Anglican Catholic Church claims apostolic succession, originating from The Episcopal Church from before the date of ordination of women to the priesthood. It is also stated that there are Old Catholic and Polish National Catholic Church consecrations in the line of succession. The first bishops of the Anglican Church of North America, later named the Anglican Catholic Church, were consecrated on January 28, 1978, in Denver, Colorado. In Denver, Charles Dale David Doren, sometime archdeacon of the Diocese of Taejon in South Korea, was consecrated by the Rt Rev'd Albert Arthur Chambers, sometime Pecusa Bishop of Springfield (PECUSA #588) and acting metropolitan of the ACNA. Joining Bishop Chambers in the consecration of Doren was the Rt Rev'd Francisco de Jesus Pagtakhan of the Philippine Independent Catholic Church. Letters of consent and desire for the Doren consecration were in hand from the Rt Rev'd Mark Pae (Taejon, Korea) and Rt Rev'd Charles Boynton.

In addition to Chambers, Pae, and Boynton, additional bishops of the Anglican Communion have joined the line of episcopal succession of the ACC, including John-Charles Vockler, Haydn Jones, and Harold Lee Nutter.

=== Metropolitan archbishops (Original Province) ===
- Albert Chambers (Acting Metropolitan) 1978
- Charles David Dale Doren (Senior Bishop) 1978–1981
- James Orin Mote (Senior Bishop) 1981 - 1983
- Louis W. Falk 1983 – 1991
- William O. Lewis 1991 – 1997
- Michael Dean Stephens 1997 – 1998
- John T Cahoon, Jnr. 1999 – 2001
- John Vockler 2001 – 2005
- Mark Haverland 2005–present

=== Active episcopate ===
- Metropolitan of the Original Province and Acting Primate: Mark Haverland, Athens, Georgia
- Bishop Ordinary, Diocese of Lahore, Punjab, Pakistan: Mushtaq Andrew
- Metropolitan of the Third Province, Province of Southern Africa: Dominic Mdunyelwa
- Bishop Ordinary, Diocese of the Holy Cross: Paul C. Hewett, Columbia, South Carolina
- Bishop Ordinary, Diocese of the Mid-Atlantic States: Jeffrey S. Johnson, Saluda, Virginia
- Bishop Ordinary, Diocese of New Orleans: Terry Lowe, Natchitoches, Louisiana
- Bishop Ordinary, Diocese of New England: Rocco Florenza, Ansonia, Connecticut
- Bishop Ordinary, Diocese of the Eastern United States: The Rt. Rev. William Bower, SSC, Timonium, Maryland
- Bishop Ordinary, Diocese of the Northeast: The Rt. Rev.. Alexander H. Webb, Amherst, NH
- Bishop Ordinary, Diocese of the Missouri Valley:The Rt. Rev. Patrick S. Fodor, Quincy, IL
- Bishop Ordinary, Diocese of the West: The Rt. Rev. Robert Murray Hammond, Fillmore, CA
- Bishop Ordinary, Diocese of Puerto Rico and the Caribbean:The Most Rev. Juan Garcia, Ponce, PR
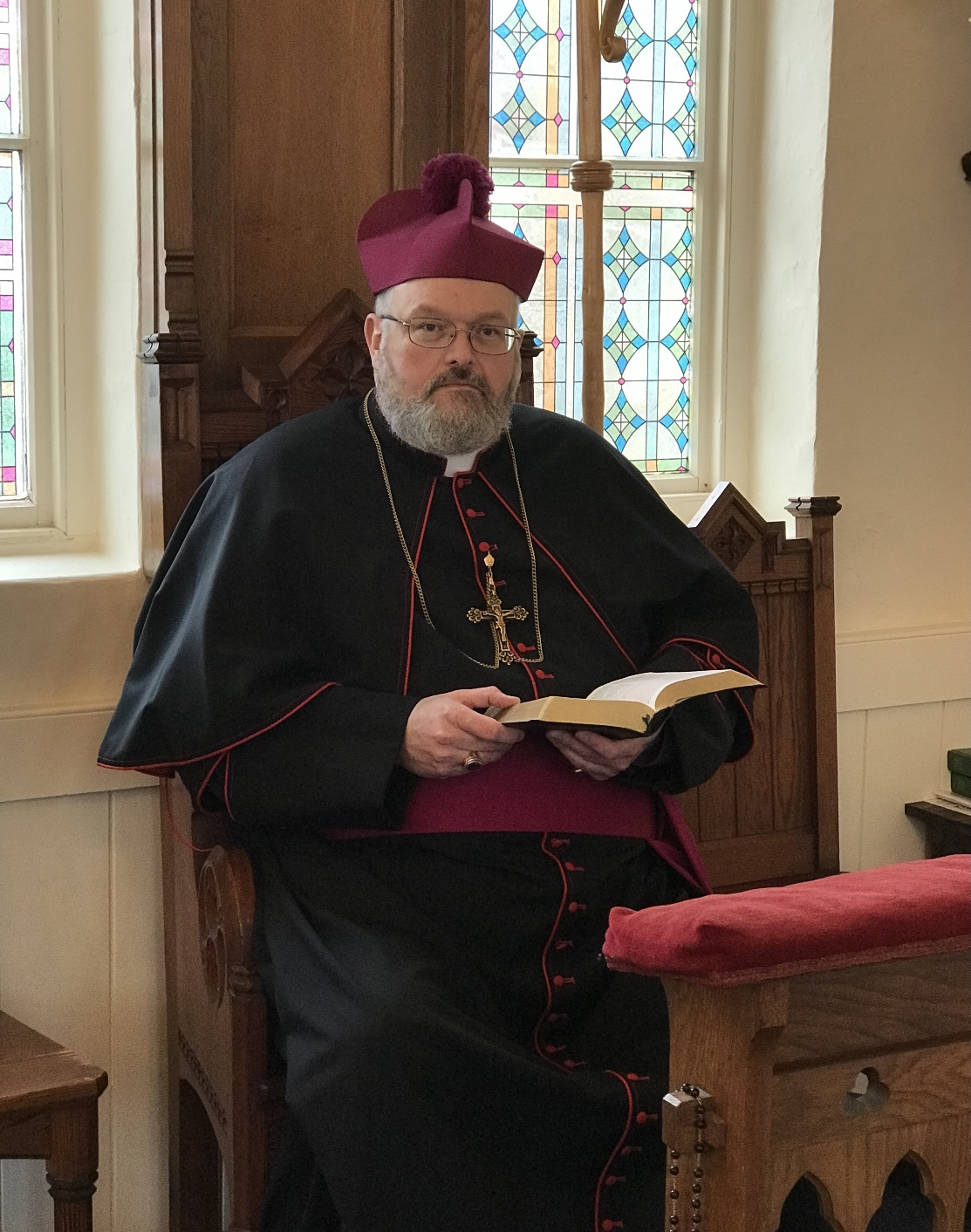
- The Right Revd Dr Damien Mead, Bishop Ordinary of the Diocese of the United Kingdom
  Bishop Ordinary, Diocese of the United Kingdom: Damien Mead, Lydd, Romney Marsh, Kent
- Bishop Ordinary, Diocese of Australia & New Zealand: Ian Woodman, Mermaid Beach, Australia
- Bishop Ordinary, Diocese of Aweil (Sudan): Wilson Garang
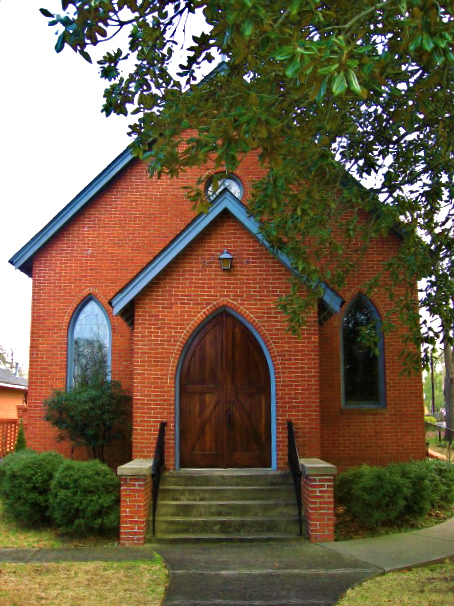
- All Saints Anglican Church, Aiken, SC. A parish of the Diocese of the South.
  Bishop Ordinary, Diocese of the South: Mark Haverland, Athens, Georgia
- Bishop Ordinary, Diocese of the Holy Trinity: Stephen Scarlett, Newport Beach, CA
- Bishop Ordinary, Diocese of Christ the Redeemer (South Africa): Solomzi Mentjies
- Bishop Ordinary, Diocese of the Kei (South Africa): Dominic Mdunyelwa
- Bishop Ordinary, Missionary Diocese of Ekurhuleni (South Africa): Elliot Mnyande
- Bishop Ordinary, Missionary Diocese of the Vaal (South Africa): Jacob Qhesi
- Bishop Ordinary, Diocese of Christ the King (South Africa): Siviwe Samuel Maqoma, Makhanda, South Africa
- Bishop Ordinary, Missionary Diocese of Saint Paul (South Africa), Samuel Mzukisi Banzana, Port Elizabeth, South Africa
- Bishop Ordinary, Missionary Diocese of Johannesburg, Xolani Mhlakaza, Soweto, South Africa
- Bishop Ordinary, Diocese of Zimbabwe: Elfigio Mandizvidza, Harare, Zimbabwe
- Bishop Ordinary, Diocese of Port Elizabeth, Sipho Goba
- Bishop Ordinary, Diocese of East London, Luvo Mandita
- Bishop Ordinary, Missionary Diocese of Qumbu, Siphiwo Maqanda
- Bishop Ordinary, Diocese of Tanzania, Philip Elibarik Kutta
- Missionary Bishop of the Province of Southern Africa, Andile Ntamo
- Bishop Ordinary, Missionary Diocese of Kenya: John Ndegwa, Kayole, Nairobi, Kenya
- Bishop Ordinary, Diocese of Cameroon: Alphonse Ndutiye
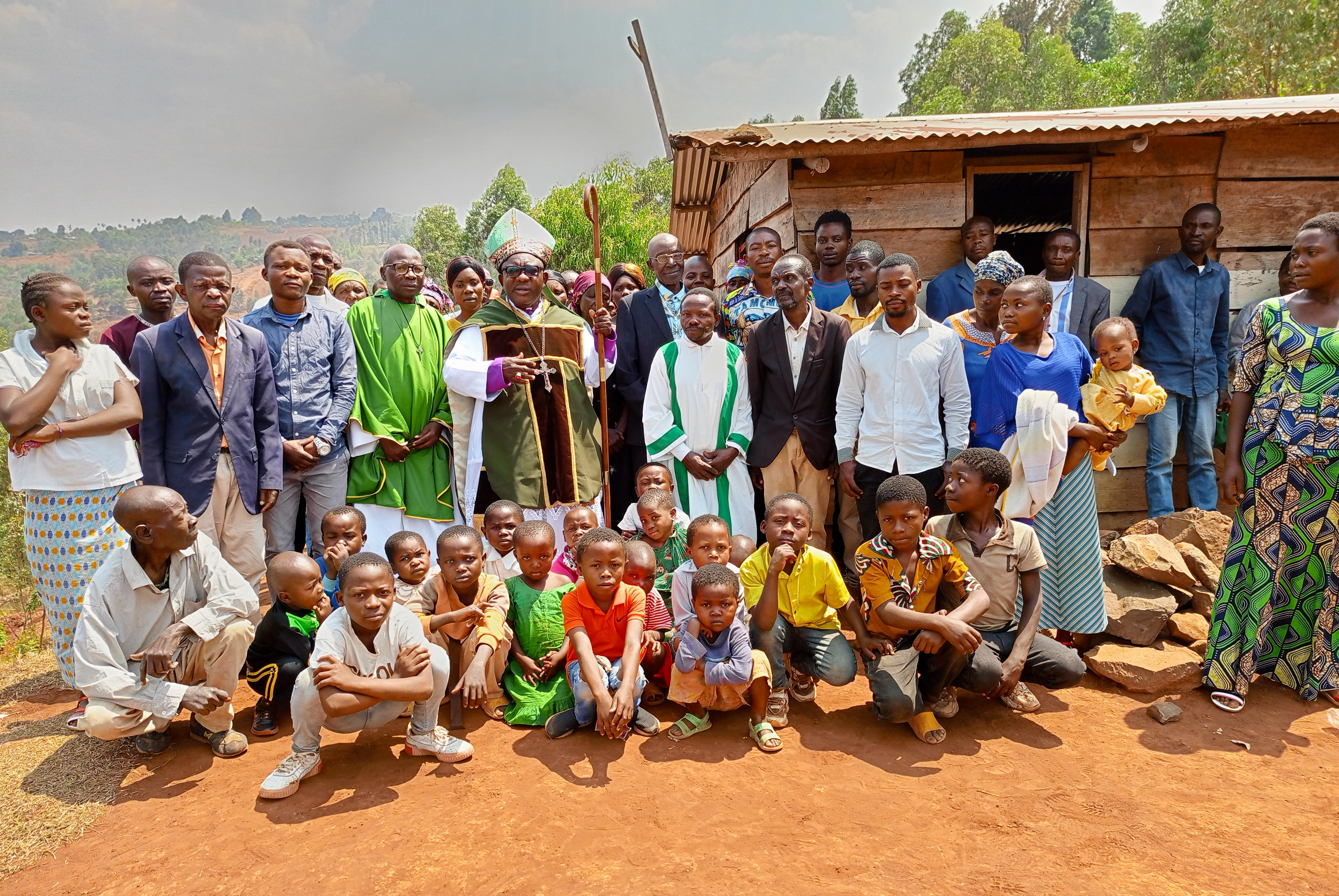
- The Right Revd Dr Steven Ayule-Milenge, Bishop Ordinary of the Diocese of Congo, during an episcopal visit at Saint Jean Baptiste Evangeliste Cirhavanyi, Territory of Kabare Province of South-Kivu, DRC
  Bishop Ordinary, Diocese of the Congo: Steven Ayule-Milenge, Bukavu, DRC
- Bishop Ordinary, Missionary Diocese of Eastern Congo: Lamek Mtundu
- Bishop Ordinary, Diocese of the New Granada: Germán Orrego Hurtado, Pereira, Colombia
- Bishop Ordinary, Diocese of the Philippines: Arthur Dejes Rosales
- Bishop Ordinary, Diocese of Mindanao: Jun Paul Ledres Canillo

=== Retired ===
- The Right Reverend Presley Hutchens (Diocese of New Orleans 2005 – 2012)
- The Right Reverend Denis Hodge (Diocese of Australia and New Zealand)
- The Right Reverend Stanley Lazarczyk (Diocese of the South)
- The Right Reverend Donald Lerow (Diocese of the Mid-Atlantic States)

=== Deceased ===
- The Most Reverend William O. Lewis (? – September 23, 1997), bishop of the Diocese of the Midwest (1979–1987), bishop of the Diocese of the South (1987–1997), and archbishop (1991–1997)
- The Most Reverend Michael Dean Stephens (1940 – March 29, 1998), bishop of the Diocese of New Orleans (1986–1998) and archbishop (1997–1998)
- The Right Reverend William Rutherford (1919–2001), retired bishop of the Diocese of the Mid-Atlantic States (1981–1995)
- The Right Reverend Joseph Philip Deyman (11 June 1940 - 23 May 2000), bishop of the Diocese of the Midwest (1988–2000)
- The Most Reverend John T. Cahoon, Jnr. (January 3, 1948 – October 4, 2001), bishop of the Diocese of the Mid-Atlantic States (1995–2001) and archbishop (1999–2001)
- The Right Reverend Harry Burgoyne Scott III (May 13, 1947 - September 19, 2002), bishop of the Mid-Atlantic States (2002)
- The Right Reverend James Orin Mote (January 27, 1922 – April 28, 2006), retired bishop of the Diocese of the Holy Trinity (1978–1994)
- The Right Reverend John Vockler, FODC (July 22, 1924 – February 6, 2014), retired bishop of the Diocese of New Orleans (1999–2005) and retired archbishop (2001–2005)
- The Right Reverend Arthur Roger Dawson (September 9, 1938 – July 2, 2016), retired bishop of Caracas, Venezuela
- The Right Reverend John-Benedict (McDonald), CGS (December 20, 1956 – December 8, 2018), bishop of the Missionary Diocese of the Philippines (October 20, 2016 – December 8, 2018)
- The Right Reverend Edward Ethan LaCour (November 4, 1928 – February 1, 2020), retired Vicar General in the Diocese of the South
- The Right Reverend Alan Kenyon-Hoare (December 21, 1936 – January 20, 2021), retired bishop of the ACC Missionary Diocese of South Africa (November 7, 2010 – March 1, 2015)
- The Right Reverend Rommie Starks (January 7, 1955 – August 21, 2023), bishop of the Diocese of the Midwest (2000–2023)
- The Right Reverend Augustine Koliti, (? - June 25, 2025), suffragan bishop of the Diocese of the Kei
- The Right Reverend William McClean (Diocese of the Mid-Atlantic States)

== Publications ==
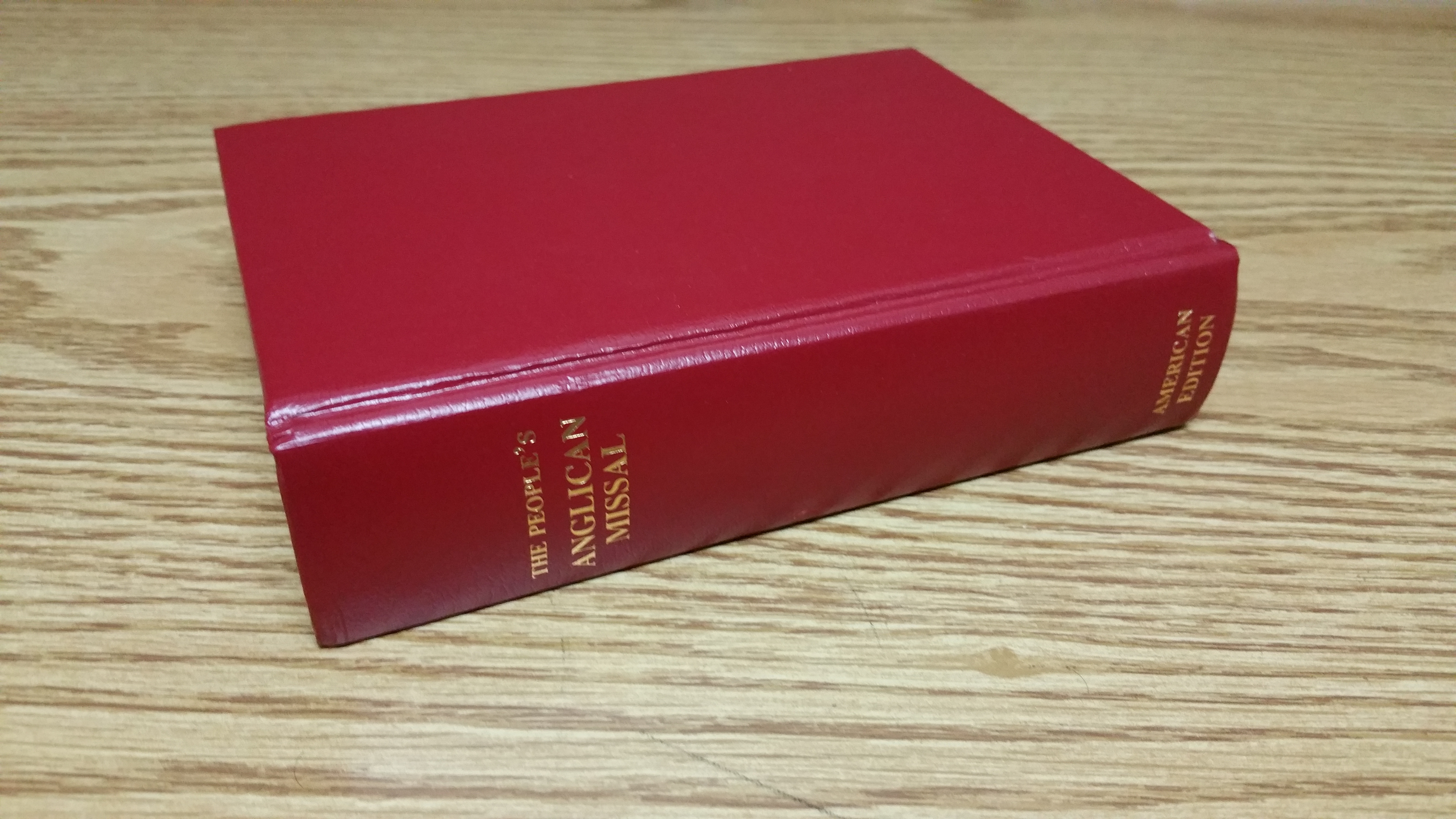
People's Anglican Missal

The official publishing house of the ACC is the Anglican Parishes Association, an organization founded in 1981 by the then Right Reverend William O. Lewis. It operates from Athens, Georgia. In 2020, the Anglican Parishes Association republished a new edition of the Anglican Missal, containing the Ordinary and Canon from the English (1549), American (1928), South African (1954), Canadian (1962), and Indian (1963) Prayer Books, along with a parallel text of the Gregorian Mass in Latin and in English. The missal also contains in its calendar propers for Anglican Servants of God, many of whom were included in the 1933 Supplement to the Missal edited by The Reverend James Tait Plowden-Wardlaw (Clement Humilis, M.A.).

=== Official gazettes ===
The Trinitarian is the Official Gazette of the Anglican Catholic Church. It was founded in 1979 as the diocesan newsletter of the Diocese of the Holy Trinity, and in 1982 became the principal news outlet of the ACC. Since 2018 it has also carried official news of the other G-4 churches.

==== Diocesan newsletters ====
- Fortnightly (Diocese of the Holy Cross)
- ACC-UK (Diocese of the United Kingdom)
- The Credo (Diocese of the Mid-Atlantic States)
- The Southern Cross (Diocese of the South)
- The Traditional Anglican News (The Traditional Anglican Church of Canada)

== See also ==
- Congress of St. Louis
- Continuing Anglican movement
- Episcopal succession in the Anglican Catholic Church
- Province of Southern Africa
- Diocese of the Holy Cross
- Diocese of the Mid-Atlantic States
- Diocese of the Midwest
- Diocese of the United Kingdom
- Diocese of Congo
