= Diocese of the Mid-Atlantic States =

American Anglican Catholic Church

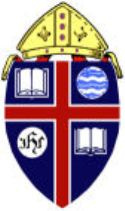
- Coat of arms

Location
- Country: United States
- Territory: Virginia, Delaware, Maryland, Washington D.C., West Virginia (except Cabell and Wayne counties), and the counties of Sullivan and Washington in Tennessee
- Ecclesiastical province: Anglican Catholic Church Original Province
- Metropolitan: Mark Haverland

Information
- Denomination: Anglican Catholic Church
- Established: 1979

Current leadership
- Bishop: Jeffrey Johnson

Website
- https://dmas-acc.org/

The Diocese of the Mid-Atlantic States is the official organization of the Anglican Catholic Church in Virginia, Delaware, Maryland (including Washington D.C.), West Virginia (except Cabell and Wayne counties), and the counties of Sullivan and Washington in Tennessee.

After the creation of the Anglican Catholic Church following the Congress of St. Louis, the Diocese of the Mid-Atlantic States was formed in 1979 and held its first Synod. Bishop Charles Dale Doren was the first bishop of the newly created diocese. William J. Rutherford was elected in 1980 as bishop coadjutor, and consecrated on March 8, 1980. In 1980, the diocese claimed 22 parishes. Bishop Doren later left the Anglican Catholic Church to form the United Episcopal Church of North America, and Bishop Rutherford became Bishop Ordinary from 1981 until his retirement in 1995. In 1983, a number of clergy and their parishes opposed to the newly organized church and the adoption of the Constitution and Canons that were drafted in 1978 in Dallas, left with Bishop Robert Harvey of the Diocese of the Southwest, among whom was Fr. Lester Kinsolving. Bishop Rutherford was succeeded by Bishop Coadjutor John T. Cahoon Jr. Bishop Cahoon was made archbishop of the Anglican Catholic Church in 1999, a position he held concurrently until his death in 2001. He was succeeded by Harry Burgoyne Scott III, who died within a year. William McClean Jr. was consecrated March 15, 2003 to be the fifth bishop ordinary, and held that office until his retirement in 2011.

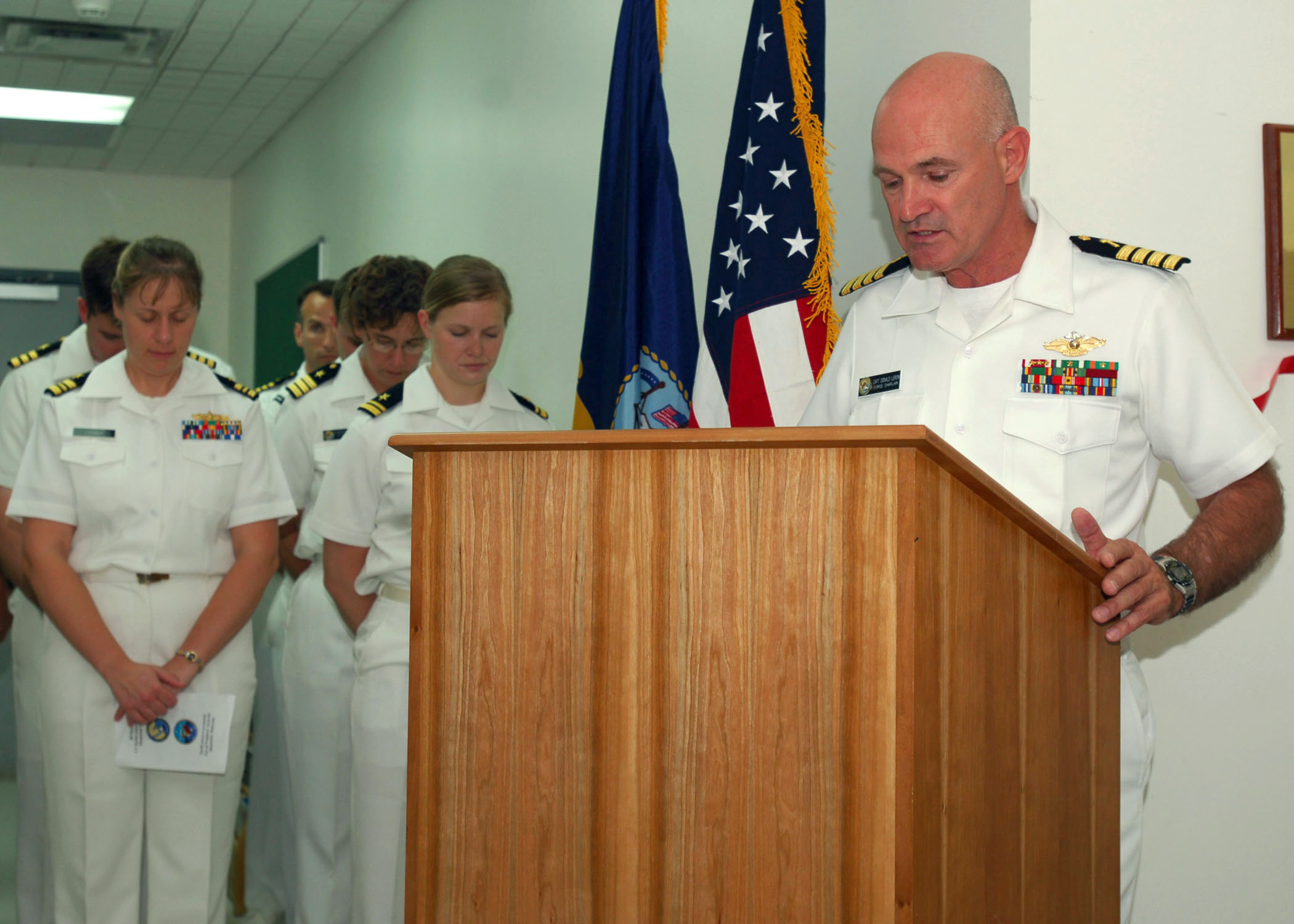
Donald F. Lerow, retired Bishop Ordinary of the Diocese of the Mid-Atlantic States

Bishop Donald Francis Lerow was consecrated in 2012 as Bishop of the Armed Forces (ACC) and the episcopal visitor for the Diocese of the Mid-Atlantic States (ACC). He became the Bishop Ordinary in 2013, a post he held until he announced his retirement in 2024.Bishop Lerow, also a Captain of the U.S. Navy, has been the endorser of chaplaincy for the Anglican Catholic Church with the U.S. Department of Defense.

Jeffrey Scott Johnson, Rector of All Saints Anglican Church in Saluda, Virginia, was elected in June 2024 to be the seventh Bishop Ordinary of the diocese. He was consecrated at St. Alban's Anglican Catholic Church in Richmond, Virginia on October 12, 2024.

== Parishes ==
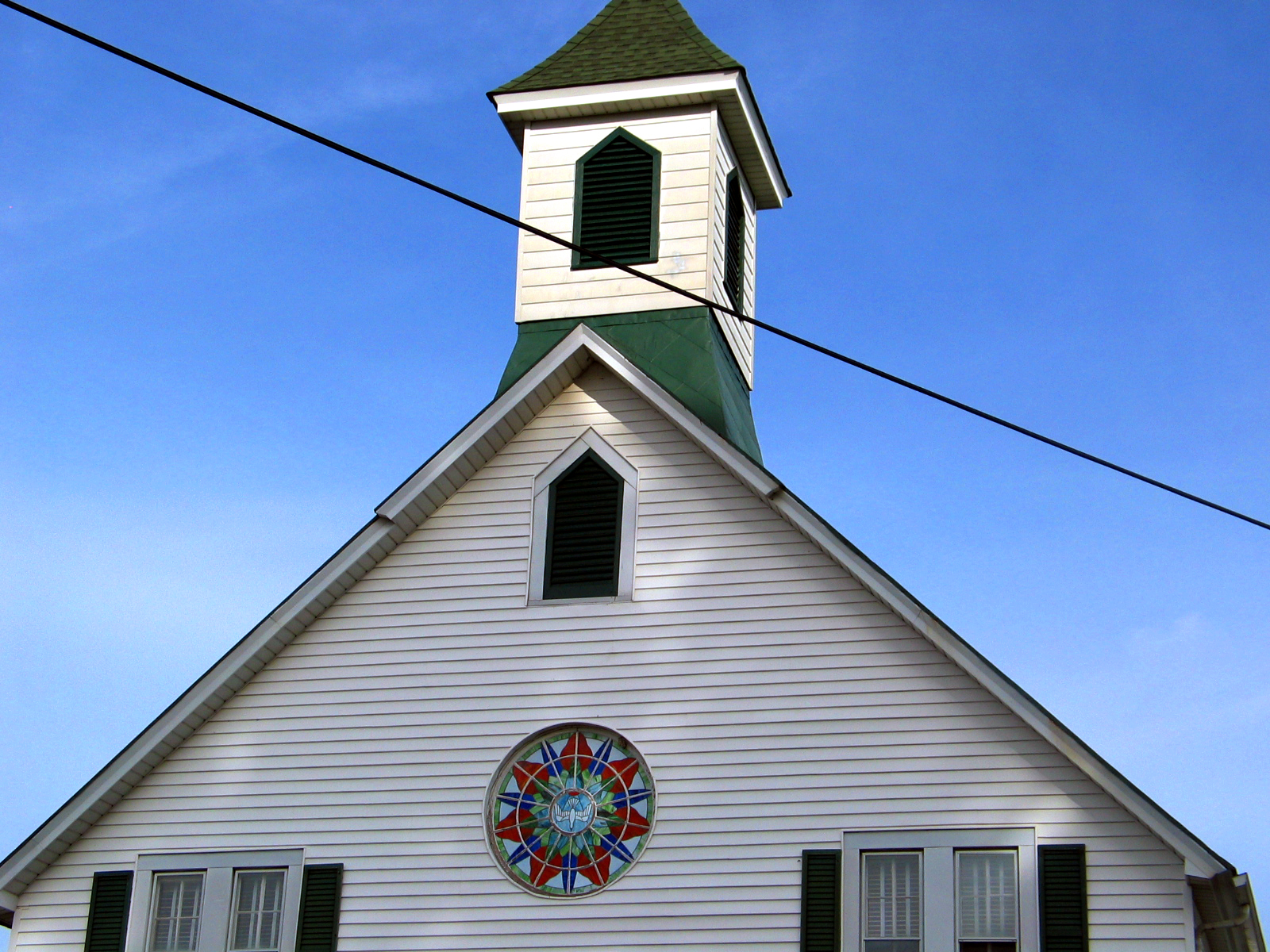
All Saints Anglican Church, Saluda, Virginia

- All Angels Anglican Catholic Church, Alexandria, Virginia
- All Saints Anglican Church, Saluda, Virginia

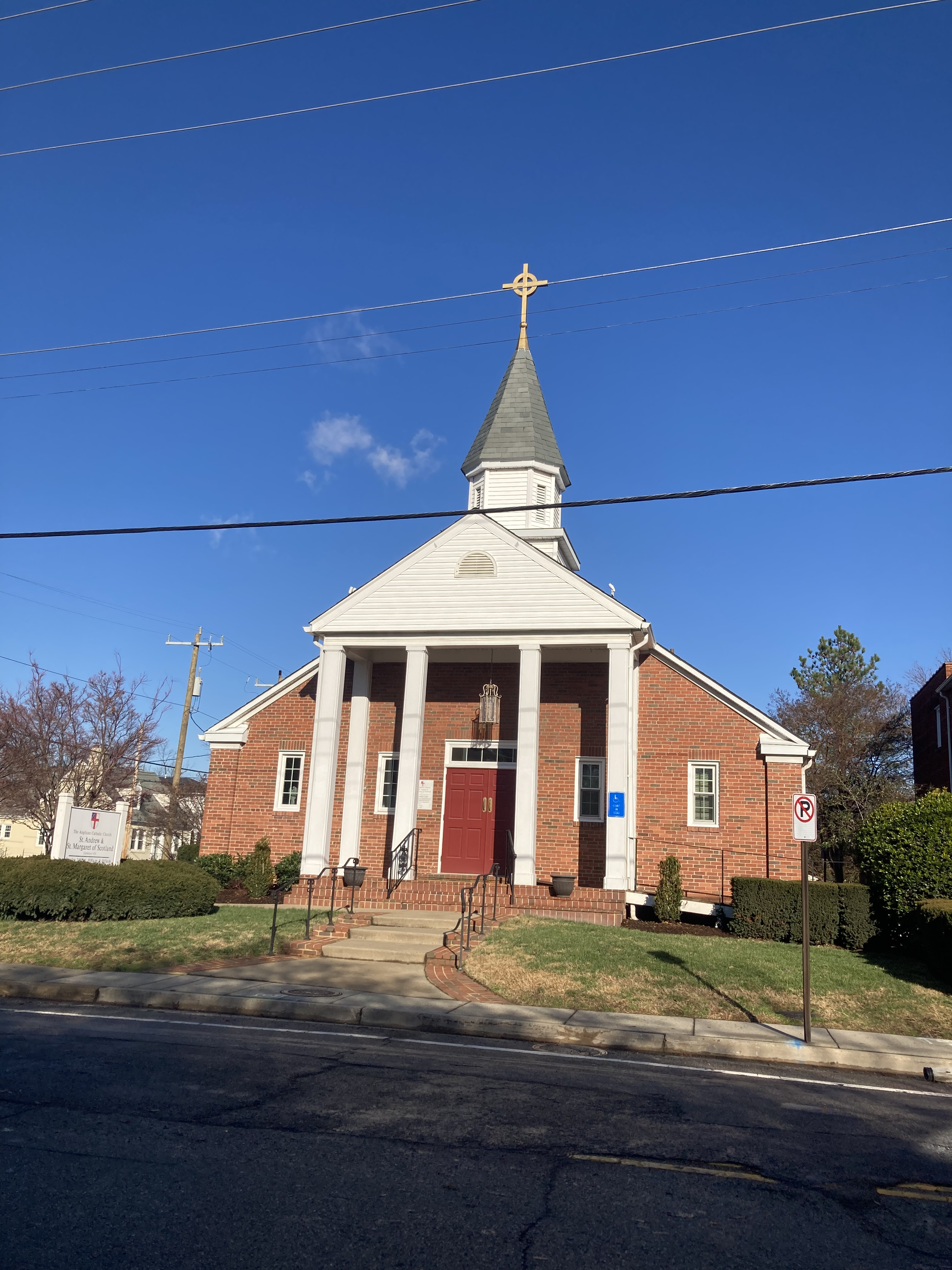
Church of St. Andrew and St. Margaret of Scotland, Alexandria, VA

- Church of St. Andrew and St. Margaret of Scotland, Alexandria, Virginia
- Our Lady of Good Hope Monastery, Montross, Virginia
- St. Alban's Anglican Church, Richmond, Virginia
- St. Anne's Anglican Church, Charlotte Hall, Maryland
- St. David's Anglican Church (Mission), Charlottesville, Virginia
- St. John's Anglican Church, Virginia Beach, Virginia
- St. Leonard's Anglican Church (Mission), Keystone, West Virginia
- St. Luke's Anglican Church, Fredericksburg, Virginia
- St. Mary's Anglican Church, Wilmington, Delaware
- St. Michael the Archangel Anglican Catholic Church in Petersville, Maryland (formerly in Frederick)

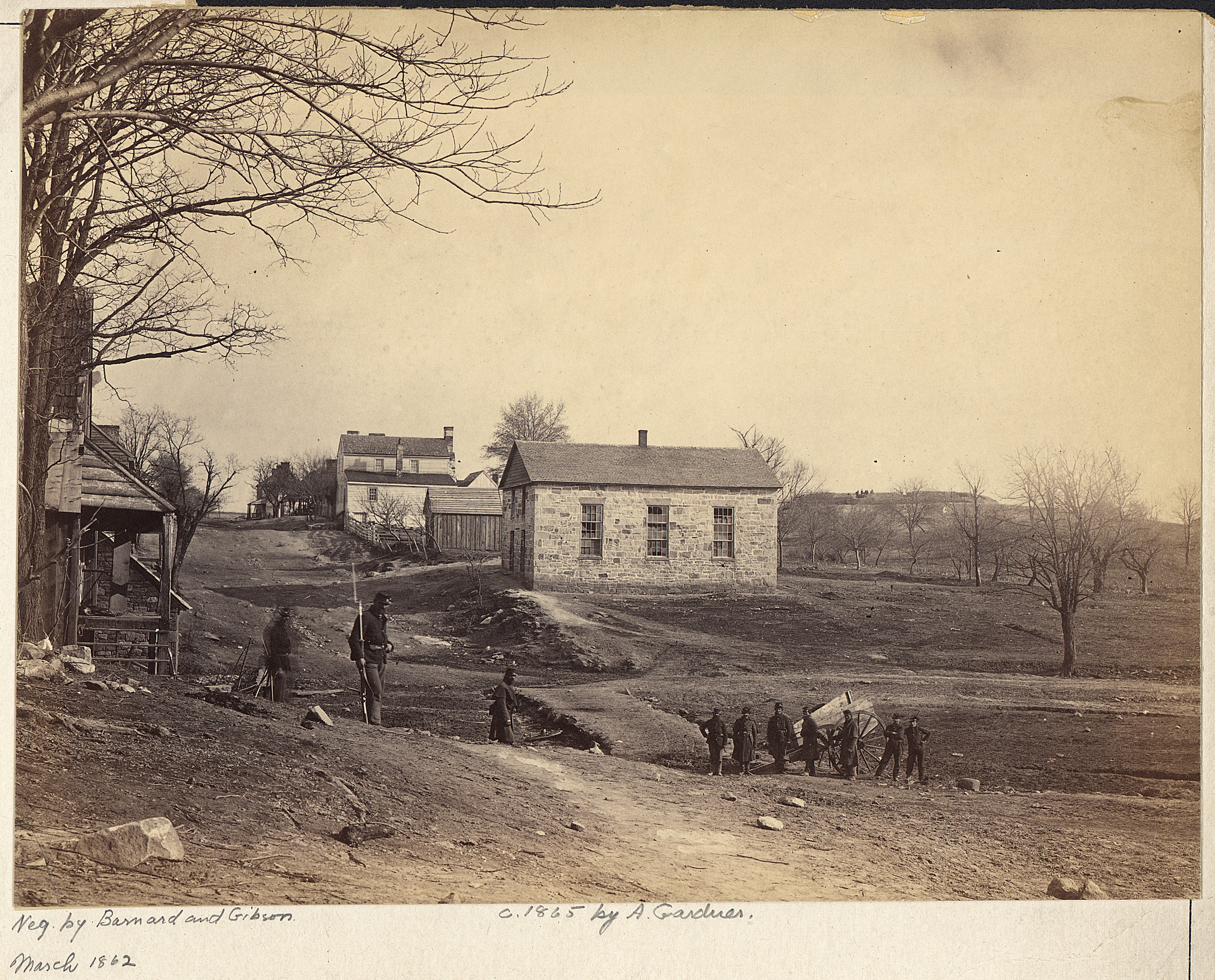
Old Stone Church, a historic site in Centreville, VA, now the location of The Church of the Ascension since 1992

- St. Peter the Apostle, Christiansburg, Virginia
- St. Stephen's Anglican Church, Clifton Forge, Virginia
- St. Thomas of Canterbury, Roanoke, Virginia
- The Church of the Ascension, Centreville, Virginia

== Notable persons ==
- The Right Reverend William Rutherford (1919–2001), retired bishop of the Diocese of the Mid-Atlantic States (1981–1995)
- The Most Reverend John T. Cahoon, Jnr. (January 3, 1948 – October 4, 2001), bishop of the Diocese of the Mid-Atlantic States (1995–2001) and archbishop (1999–2001)
- The Right Reverend Harry Burgoyne Scott III (May 13, 1947 - September 19, 2002), bishop of the Mid-Atlantic States (2002)
- Rear Adm. Frank S. Haak (January 26, 1924 - January 21, 2011), sometime senior warden of St. Andrew and St. Margaret of Scotland, Alexandria, Va. and executive secretary of the ACC's Military Ordinariate
- Samuel T. ‘Dusty’ Rhodes (December 31, 1926 - January 9, 2014), retired Army lieutenant colonel and longtime member of the Church of St. Andrew and St. Margaret of Scotland, Alexandria, VA
- Reverend Canon Kenneth W. Gunn-Walberg, Ph.D. (January 2, 194 - August 15, 2021)
- D. Bruce Shine (August 11, 1938 — December 6, 2021), Diocesan Chancellor
- Reverend Dennis LeGrand Sossi (September 17, 1942 – September 15, 2024), Provincial and Diocesan Registrar, member of the Provincial and Diocesan Constitution and Canons committees, member of the Provincial Administrative Council
