= Charles Doren =

Charles Dale David Doren was the first bishop consecrated to serve the Continuing Anglican movement, which began in 1977 in reaction to decisions taken in 1976 at the General Convention of the Episcopal Church in the United States of America. He was born on 18 November 1915 in Marvin, South Dakota, the son of Ernest Ray and Mae E. (née Wheeler) Doren. Doren was prepared for Holy Orders at Seabury-Western Theological Seminary and was ordained a priest in November 1944 by Bishop Roberts of the Protestant Episcopal Church. On 16 June 1946 he married Bonney Dixon Ward in Beadle, South Dakota. Doren served at a series of parishes in the USA, including a period as a Canon of St Mark's Cathedral, Minneapolis. He was later a missionary in Korea holding the office of Archdeacon for some years before returning to the United States and settling in Paoli, Pennsylvania.

Following the St Louis Congress of Concerned Churchmen in September 1977, Archdeacon Doren was elected as first bishop of the Diocese of the Midwest in what is now the Anglican Catholic Church. In Denver, Colorado, on 28 January 1978 Doren was consecrated by a retired bishop of the Episcopal Church in the United States of America, the Right Reverend Albert Arthur Chambers, who temporarily held jurisdiction over the original Anglican Church of North America along with Bishop Francisco Pagtakhan of the Philippine Independent Church as co-consecrator. The Right Reverend Mark Pae of the Anglican Church of Korea sent a letter of consent. Bishop Doren, Bishop Chambers, and Bishop Pagtakhan then consecrated James Orin Mote, Robert S. Morse, and Peter Francis Watterson. Bishop Doren is regarded as the "Primus" of the four bishops consecrated for the Continuing Anglican movement. It is these consecrations which began what would become the multi-jurisdictional Continuing Anglican movement.

Bishop Doren was later translated to the smaller Diocese of the Mid-Atlantic States, where he served until late 1980. Following a series of disagreements with Bishop Mote and the leadership of the Anglican Catholic Church, three parishes that had formerly been under Doren's jurisdiction left the ACC and founded the United Episcopal Church of North America in 1981. The new church was intended to be a home for Anglicans of the Low to Central Church ceremonial tradition and to continue the doctrine, discipline, and worship of the old Protestant Episcopal Church with as little alteration as possible.

At its organizing Convention in 1982, the UECNA adopted the 1958 Constitution and Canons of the Protestant Episcopal Church as its own with minimal alterations. However, to distinguish the new jurisdiction from its parent, the title 'Presiding Bishop' was altered to 'Archbishop', and Bishop Doren was elected to fill that office. However, unlike a traditional Archbishop, he did not exercise authority as primate; such authority remained vested in the House of Bishops as a whole. As required by the Canons, he retired as Archbishop of the UECNA in April 1989, this being the General Convention following his 72nd birthday. Bishop Albion Williamson Knight, Jr. (1924 to 2012) was elected to succeed him.

Archbishop Doren lived in retirement in Pennsylvania and later moved to Florida. He died in 2014.

Religious titles
New creation	Archbishop of the United Episcopal Church of North America; 1982–1989	Succeeded by Albion Knight, Jr.
