= Episcopal succession in the Anglican Catholic Church =

These are the bishops consecrated in the Anglican Catholic Church (ACC), starting with the original consecrations performed in Denver, Colorado, on January 28, 1978. The name or number in bold indicates the chief consecrator, who would either be the metropolitan, the acting metropolitan, or a bishop acting with the warrant of the metropolitan or acting metropolitan. An asterisk denotes a bishop who has departed from the communion of the ACC.

Name	Consecrators	Date	Episcopal post	Notes
001 DOREN, Charles Dale David	**Albert A. Chambers** (TEC), Francisco de Jesus Pagtakhan (Philippine Independent Catholic Church), Mark Pae (Anglican Church of Korea) (Consent), Charles Boynton (TEC) (Consent)	January 28, 1978	Bishop of the Diocese of the Midwest (1978-1979);Bishop of the Diocese of the Mid-Atlantic States (1979-1981)	Left to form the United Episcopal Church of North America in 1981.
002 MOTE, James Orin	**Chambers**, Pagtakhan, 001	January 28, 1978	Bishop of the Diocese of the Holy Trinity (1978-1994); Senior Bishop (1981-1983)	Deceased April 28, 2006
003 MORSE, Robert Sherwood	**Chambers**, Pagtakhan, 001	January 28, 1978	Bishop of the Diocese of Christ the King (1978-1991)	Remained independent of the ACC
004 WATTERSON, Peter Francis	**Chambers**, Pagtakhan, 001	January 28, 1978	Bishop of the Diocese of the Southeastern United States (1978-1984)	Left in 1984
005 BURNS, William Francis	**001**, 002, Chambers (Consent)	November 11, 1978	Bishop of the Diocese of the Resurrection (1978-?)	Deceased 2000
006 LEWIS, William Oliver	001, 002, **005**	May 26, 1979	Bishop of the Diocese of the Midwest (1979–1987); Bishop of the Diocese of the South (1987–1997); Archbishop of the Original Province (1991–1997), Acting Metropolitan of Church of India, Pakistan, Ceylon, and Burma (CIPBC)	Deceased September 23, 1997
007 KNUTTI, Frank Russell	001, 002, **005**, 006	January 12, 1980	Bishop of the Diocese of the South (1980-1983)	Deacesed January 25, 1983
008 RUTHERFORD, Wm. deJ.	**001**, 002, 005, 006, 007	March 8, 1980	Bishop Coadjutor of the Diocese of the Mid-Atlantic States (1980-1981) and Bishop of the Diocese of the Mid-Atlantic States (1981–1995)	Deceased 2001
009 HARVEY, Robert Condit	**002**, 005, 006, 008	April 19, 1980	Bishop of the Diocese of the Southwest	Left in 1983 to join the American Episcopal Church
010 FALK, Louis Wahl	**002**, 005, 006, 008	February 14, 1981	Bishop of the Diocese of the Missouri Valley (1981-2005); Archbishop of the Original Province (1983-1991), Acting Metropolitan of Church of CIPBC	Left to form the Traditional Anglican Communion in 1991
011 RUIZ, Justo Pastor	002, 005, **007**	April 17, 1982	Bishop of the Caribbean	Deceased January 2, 1989
012 WILLIAMS, Tillman Beshore	005, **008**, 011	August 27, 1983	Bishop of the Diocese of the South (1983-1986)	Left to join the Diocese of Christ the King in 1986
013 KLEPPINGER, Thos. Justin *	005 (sub conditione)	April 10, 1986	Bishop Coadjutor of the Diocese of the Resurrection (1986-?) and Bishop of the Diocese of the Resurrection (?-1997)	Left to form the Holy Catholic Church Anglican Rite in 1997.
014 STEPHENS, Michael Dean	002, 008, 010 (sub conditione)	August 8, 1986	Bishop of the Diocese of New Orleans (1986–1998); Archbishop of the Original Province (1997–1998)	Deceased March 29, 1998
015 CHAMBERLAIN, Bruce S.	002, 006, **010,** Alfred Woolcock (ACCC)	October 18, 1986	Bishop of the Diocese of New England (1986-1991)	Left to form the Traditional Anglican Communion in 1991
016 DEYMAN, Joseph Philip	006, **010**, Woolcock	January 9, 1988	Bishop of the Diocese of the Midwest (1988–2000)	Deceased 23 May 2000
017 WILLARS, Richard Cecil	002, 005, **010**, 011, 013, 014, 016, Woolcock, Pae	January 30, 1988	Bishop of the Diocese of the Pacific Southwest (1988-1993)	Deceased 1993
018 CONNORS, Robin Bradley	002, 005, **010**, 011, 013, 014, 016, Woolcock, Pae	January 30, 1988	Auxiliary to the Metropolitan	Left to form the Traditional Anglican Communion in 1991
019 RODRIGUEZ-Molina, Ruben	002, 017, 018	March 13, 1988	Bishop of the Diocese of the Caribbean and New Granada	Left to join the Traditional Anglican Communion
020 CAHOON, John Thayer Jr.	002, **003**, Woolcock (received in Orders from APCK, 1989)	January 25, 1986	Bishop Coadjutor of the Diocese of the Mid-Atlantic States (1986-1995) and Bishop of the Diocese of the Mid-Atlantic States (1995–2001); Archbishop of the Original Province (1999–2001)	Deceased October 4, 2001
021 PRICE, Alastair (Alexander) Edwin	002, **006**, 008, 013, 014, 016, John C. Gramley (UECNA)	January 25, 1992	Bishop of the Missionary Diocese of New Zealand	Left to form the Holy Catholic Church Anglican Rite in 1997. Later joined ROCOR.
022 McNELEY, James Richard	002, **006**, 008, 013, 014, 016, Gramley	January 25, 1992	Bishop of the Missionary Diocese of the Great Plains	Left to form the Holy Catholic Church Anglican Rite in 1997
023 HAMLETT, Leslie *	002, **006**, 013, 014, 016, 022	August 1, 1992	Bishop of the Missionary Diocese of England & Wales (1992-1997)	Left to form the Holy Catholic Church Anglican Rite in 1997
024 BROMLEY, James Edward	002, **006**, 013, 014, 016, 022	May 6, 1993	Bishop of the Missionary Diocese of Australia, Acting Metropolitan of Church of CIPBC	Deceased 2004
025 SEELAND, Arthur David	002, **006**, 013, 014, 016, 022	May 6, 1993	Bishop of the Diocese of the Pacific Southwest (1993-1997)	Left to form the Holy Catholic Church Anglican Rite in 1997
026 CRUZ-Blanco. Victor Manuel *	002, **006**, 013, 014, 016, 022 (sub conditione)	May 6, 1993	Bishop of the Diocese of the Caribbean and New Granada (1994-2003)	Left to join the Holy Catholic Church Anglican Rite in 2004
027 VOCKLER, John-Charles	(Received in Orders from Anglican Church of Australia 1994)	November 30, 1959	Bishop of the Diocese of New Orleans (1999–2005); Archbishop of the Original Province (2001–2005)	Deceased February 6, 2014
028 HAVERLAND, Mark David	002, **014**, 016, 020, 024, 026	January 31, 1998	Bishop of the Diocese of the South (1998–present); Archbishop of the Original Province (2005–present)	
029 STARKS, Rommie Michael	002, **020**, 027. 028	August 14, 2000	Bishop of the Diocese of the Midwest (2000–2023)	Deceased August 21, 2023
030 SCOTT, Harry Burgoyne, III	002, 026, **027**, 028, 029	March 2, 2002	Bishop of the Diocese of the Mid-Atlantic States (2002)	Deceased September 19, 2002
031 McCLEAN, William Jr.	002, **028**, 029	March 15, 2003	Bishop of the Diocese of the Mid-Atlantic States	Retired
032 LAZARCZYK, Stanley Francis	**027**, 028, 029, 031	August 2, 2003	Bishop of the Diocese of the Resurrection (1997-2008)	Retired
033 AUGUSTINE, John	**027**, 028, 029, 031, 032	October 22, 2003	Metropolitan of CIPBC	
034 DAWSON, Arthur Roger	002, **028**, 029	November 30, 2003	Bishop of Caracas, Venezuela	Deceased July 2, 2016
035 HUTCHENS, Denver Presley	**028**, 029, 034	October 12, 2004	Bishop of the Diocese of New Orleans (2005 – 2012)	Retired
036 LaCOUR, Edward Ethan	**003**, James P. Clark (APCK), Harold L. Nutter (Anglican Church of Canada) (Consent) (Received in Orders from APCK, March 31, 2006)	October 23, 1993	Vicar General in the Diocese of the South	Deceased February 1, 2020
037 HODGE, Denis Ian Dermot	**028**, 029, 031, 032, 035, 036 (sub conditione)	October 11, 2007	Bishop of the Missionary Diocese of New Zealand	Retired
038 GARANG, Wilson Chan Awac	**028**, 029, 031, 032, 034, 035, 036 (sub conditione)	October 11, 2007	Bishop of the Diocese of Aweil (Sudan)	
039 IVERACH, Brian *	**028**, 029, 031, 032, 035, 036 (sub conditione)	October 11, 2007	Bishop Ordinary of the Missionary Diocese of Australia	Removed February 20, 2014
040 MEAD, Damien Steven Robert	**029**, 034, 037	September 20, 2008	Bishop of the Diocese of the United Kingdom (2008–present)	
041 FLORENZA, Rocco Aldo	**003**, James Provence, Frederick Morrison (Received in Orders from APCK, October 27, 2009)	June 6, 2003	Bishop of the Diocese of the Resurrection (2009–present)	
042 LOWE, Terry Allen	**035,** Stephen Reber, Peter Robinson (UECNA) (sub conditione)	April 24, 2010	Bishop of the Diocese of New Orleans	
043 KENYON-HOARE, Alan	**028**, 029, 031, 035, 036, 038, 040	October 7, 2010	Bishop of the Missionary Diocese of South Africa (November 7, 2010 – March 1, 2015)	Deceased January 20, 2021
044 MENTJIES, Solomzi	**028**, 029, 031, 035, 036, 038, 040	October 7, 2010	Bishop of the Diocese of Christ the Redeemer (South Africa)	
045 ORREGO-Hurtado, German	**028**, 029, 031, 035, 036, 038, 040	October 7, 2010	Bishop of the Diocese of the New Granada (2013–present)	
046 LEROW, Donald Francis	**028,** 031, 035	February 4, 2012	Bishop of the Armed Forces and Bishop of the Diocese of the Mid-Atlantic States (2013-2024)	Retired
047 AYULE-MILENGE, Steven	**028,** 029, 035, 036, 039, 046, and Peter Robinson (UECNA)	October 16, 2012	Bishop of the Diocese of the Congo	
048 SCARLETT, Stephen Coulter	**028,** 029, 038, 039, 040, 041, 042, 043, 044, 045, 046, 047	October 26, 2013	Bishop of Diocese of the Holy Trinity	
049 CANILLO, Rene	**029**, 038, 039, 040, 042, 042, 043, 044, 045, 046, 047 (sub conditione)	October 26, 2013	Bishop of the Missionary Diocese of the Philippines	Deceased
050 MDUNYELWA, Dominic Sonwabo	**028,** 043, 044	February 13, 2015	Bishop of the Diocese of the Kei (South Africa) and Archbishop of the Province of Southern Africa	
051 ANDREW, Mushtaq	**028,** 043, 044	February 13, 2015	Bishop of the Diocese of Lahore	
052 NDEGWA, John Kamande	**028,** 029, 031, 038, 040, 041, 042, 044, 045, 046, 047, 048, 050, 051	October 27, 2015	Bishop of the Missionary Diocese of Kenya	
053 MCDONALD, John Benedict	**028**, 029, 041, 042, 046, 048	October 20, 2016	Bishop of the Missionary Diocese of the Philippines (2016-2018)	Deceased December 8, 2018
054 WOODMAN, Ian	**013**, Leo Michael, 062, Anthony Rasch (Received in Orders from HCC-WR, October 3, 2017)	October 15, 2010	Bishop of the Diocese of Australia & New Zealand	
055 NDUTIYE, Alphonse Vascaniat	**028,** 042, 046, Brian Marsh (ACA), Stephen Strawn (ACA), Chandler Jones (APA)	October 4, 2018	Bishop of the Diocese of Cameroon	
056 MANDIZVIDZE, Elfigio	**028,** 050, 052	October 6, 2019	Bishop of the Diocese of Zimbabwe	
057 HEWETT, Paul Clayton	**Robert Waggener**, Patrick Murphy, 036, Donald Davies, Nutter (Consent)	December 4, 2004	Bishop of the Diocese of the Holy Cross	
058 QHESI, Jacob Katlego	**028**, 050, 055	November 14, 2021	Bishop of the Missionary Diocese of the Vaal (South Africa)	
059 MNYANDE, Elliot Leon	**028**, 050, 055	November 14, 2021	Bishop of the Missionary Diocese of Ekurhuleni (South Africa)	
060 MAQOMA, Siviwe Samuel	**023**, John Milnes, Ralph Torner (Received in Orders from HCC-WR, November 14, 2021)	January 3, 2016	Bishop of the Diocese of Christ the King (South Africa)	Previously the Diocese was of Umzi Wase Tiyopiya
061 MTUNDU, Lamek Mmokywa	038, **047**, 052, 054	January 30, 2022	Bishop of the Missionary Diocese of Eastern Congo	
062 BANZANA, Samuel Mzukisi	021, **023**, Michael Wright (Received in Orders from HCC-WR, May 10, 2022)	August 20, 2000	Bishop of the Missionary Diocese of Saint Paul (South Africa)	
063 MHLAKAZA, Xolani	**050**, 056, 058, 059, 060, 062	April 23, 2023	Bishop of the Missionary Diocese of Johannesburg (South Africa)	
064 NGQONO, Mbulelo Matthew	**010**, John Hepworth (TAC), Trevor Rhodes (TAC), Wellborn Hudson (ACA) (Received in Orders September 18, 2023)	January 11, 2001		
065 KOLITI, Augustine	**Michael Gill** (TAC), Craig Botterill (ACCC), Wellington Murinda (TAC) (Received in Orders December 22, 2023)	June 4, 2022	Suffragan Bishop of the Diocese of the Kei (South Africa)	Deceased June 25, 2025
066 GOBA, Sipho	**050**, 060, 062, 063, 064, 065	February 4, 2024	Bishop of the Diocese of Port Elizabeth (South Africa)	
067 MAQANDA, Siphiwo	**050**, 060, 062, 063, 064, 065	February 4, 2024	Bishop of the Missionary Diocese of Qumbu (South Africa)	
068 MANDITA, Luvo	**050**, 060, 062, 063, 064, 065	February 4, 2024	Bishop of the Diocese of East London (South Africa)	
069 NTAMO, Andile	**050**, 060, 062, 063, 064, 065	February 4, 2024	Missionary Bishop of the Province of Southern Africa	
070 KUTTA, Philip	**050**, 060, 062, 063, 064, 065	February 4, 2024	Bishop of the Diocese of Tanzania	
071 ROSALES, Arthur Dejes	**028**, 042, 046, 057	April 23, 2024	Bishop of the Diocese of the Philippines	
072 CANILLO, Jun Paul Ledres	**028**, 042, 046, 057	April 23, 2024	Bishop of the Diocese of Mindanao	
073 JOHNSON, Jeffrey Scott	**028**, 042, 046, 057, 071	October 12, 2024	Bishop of the Diocese of the Mid-Atlantic States	
