= Bartonville Agreement =

The Bartonville Agreement came from a meeting held in May 1999 by bishops representing both the Anglican Communion's American province (The Episcopal Church) and a number of Continuing Anglican jurisdictions in North America. As such, it was an early effort made by conservative Episcopal bishops and Continuing Anglican bishops to voice a common set of principles which might become the basis of future cooperation between their churches or dioceses. The schism that had divided these church bodies had occurred in 1977 at the Congress of St. Louis when "Continuers" met and formed a new Anglican church in reaction to changes in doctrine and practice that had been approved by the Episcopal Church and the Anglican Church of Canada.

These bishops assembled in Bartonville, Illinois at St. Benedict's Abbey. In his opening comments the host, Abbot Juan Alberto Morales, encouraged those present "to let the Holy Spirit guide us and show us the way that we should go...that as we face the new millennium we may present to the world a portion of the Anglican Communion reconciled and united, which in turn, may be an example to imitate for all good and faithful Anglicans and for the Church in general." The result of the meeting was the signing of a "Call to prayer" for unity and a determination to meet again.

A second convocation of bishops took place in Bartonville on October 29 of the same year. The result of this meeting was the signing of the Articles of Ecclesiastical Fellowship.

The signatories of the original compact were the following:

- Keith Ackerman, Episcopal Diocese of Quincy
- Robert Crawley, Anglican Catholic Church of Canada
- A. Donald Davies, Episcopal Missionary Church Primate *
- Louis Falk, Anglican Church in America Primate
- Herbert Groce, Anglican Rite Synod in America
- Walter Grundorf, Anglican Province of America Primate
- John Hepworth, Anglican Catholic Church in Australia
- Jack Leo Iker, Episcopal Diocese of Fort Worth
- Joel Johnson, Anglican Rite Synod in the Americas
- Edward MacBurney, retired Episcopal bishop of Quincy
- Scott Earle McLaughlin, Orthodox Anglican Church
- Robert Mercer, Anglican Catholic Church of Canada Primate
- Donald Parsons, retired Episcopal bishop of Quincy
- Donald Perschall, American Anglican Church/Anglican Synod Primate
- Larry Shaver, Diocese of St. Augustine, Anglican Rite Synod in America

^{*} It is reported that Davies was present but did not sign the document.

Present but not empowered to sign were:

- Joseph Deyman, Diocese of the Midwest, Anglican Catholic Church
- Royal U. Grote, Jr. Diocese of Mid-America, Presiding Bishop of the Reformed Episcopal Church

The following were signatories of the Articles of Ecclesiastical Fellowship:

- Louis Falk, ACA Primate
- Herbert Groce, ARSA Primate
- Walter Grundorf, APA Primate
- Scott Earle McLaughlin, OAC
- Donald Perschall, AAC & AS Primate
- Larry Shaver ARSA
- Richard Boyce, Diocese of the West, Anglican Province of America
- Ronald Johnson, Philippine Independent Catholic Church
- Robert J. Godfrey, Orthodox Anglican Church

== See also ==
- Congress of St. Louis
