= Diocese of the Holy Cross =

US Anglican Church

- Classification: Continuing Anglican
- Orientation: Anglo-Catholic
- Polity: Episcopal
- Bishop: Paul Hewett
- Associations: Intercommunion with Anglican Church in America, and the Anglican Province of America since 2017
- Region: United States
- Origin: 2003
- Separated from: Anglican Province of Christ the King
- Merged into: Anglican Catholic Church
- Official website: www.dioceseoftheholycross.org

The Diocese of the Holy Cross (DHC) is a constituent diocese of the Anglican Catholic Church, a continuing Anglican church body in the United States. Unlike most dioceses, it is not geographically defined.

== History ==
The DHC was formed by clergy and parishes belonging to the Anglican Province of Christ the King (APCK). On March 5, 2003, Ash Wednesday, the Diocese of the Holy Cross seceded from the Anglican Province of Christ the King over questions surrounding the successor of Robert S. Morse, James Provence, following a disagreement with the APCK over the election of a divorced and remarried priest to be a bishop in the church.

The diocese's founding bishop, Robert Waggener, unsuccessfully sought to lead the diocese into the Eastern Orthodox Church. Meeting with little support, Waggener left Anglicanism to become a Western-Rite Orthodox priest in the Antiochian Orthodox Christian Archdiocese of North America.

The DHC became a member of the Federation of Anglican Churches in the Americas, of Forward in Faith UK, and maintains friendly relations with other continuing churches.

In response to the Apostolic Constitution for a Personal Ordinariate, Bishop Paul Hewett characterized the initiative as "generous, courageous, creative and unprecedented" but determined that the offer needed careful discernment and that it should not be a distraction from "the vital work of setting our own house in order."

In January 2016, the Anglican Catholic Church, the Anglican Church in America, the Anglican Province of America, and the Diocese of the Holy Cross reached a formal accord. Forming the Anglican Joint Synods, a "Group of 4" churches, called the G-4, pursuing eventual corporate unity.

On October 6, 2017, at a joint synod in Atlanta, Georgia, the primates of the Anglican Province of America, the Anglican Church in America, the Anglican Catholic Church, and the Diocese of the Holy Cross signed a concordat of full communion, pledging to pursue full, institutional, and organic union.

On September 23, 2021, the Diocese of the Holy Cross voted to join the Anglican Catholic Church as a non-geographical diocese. Upon immediate acceptance, the DHC became a constituent diocese of the Anglican Catholic Church.

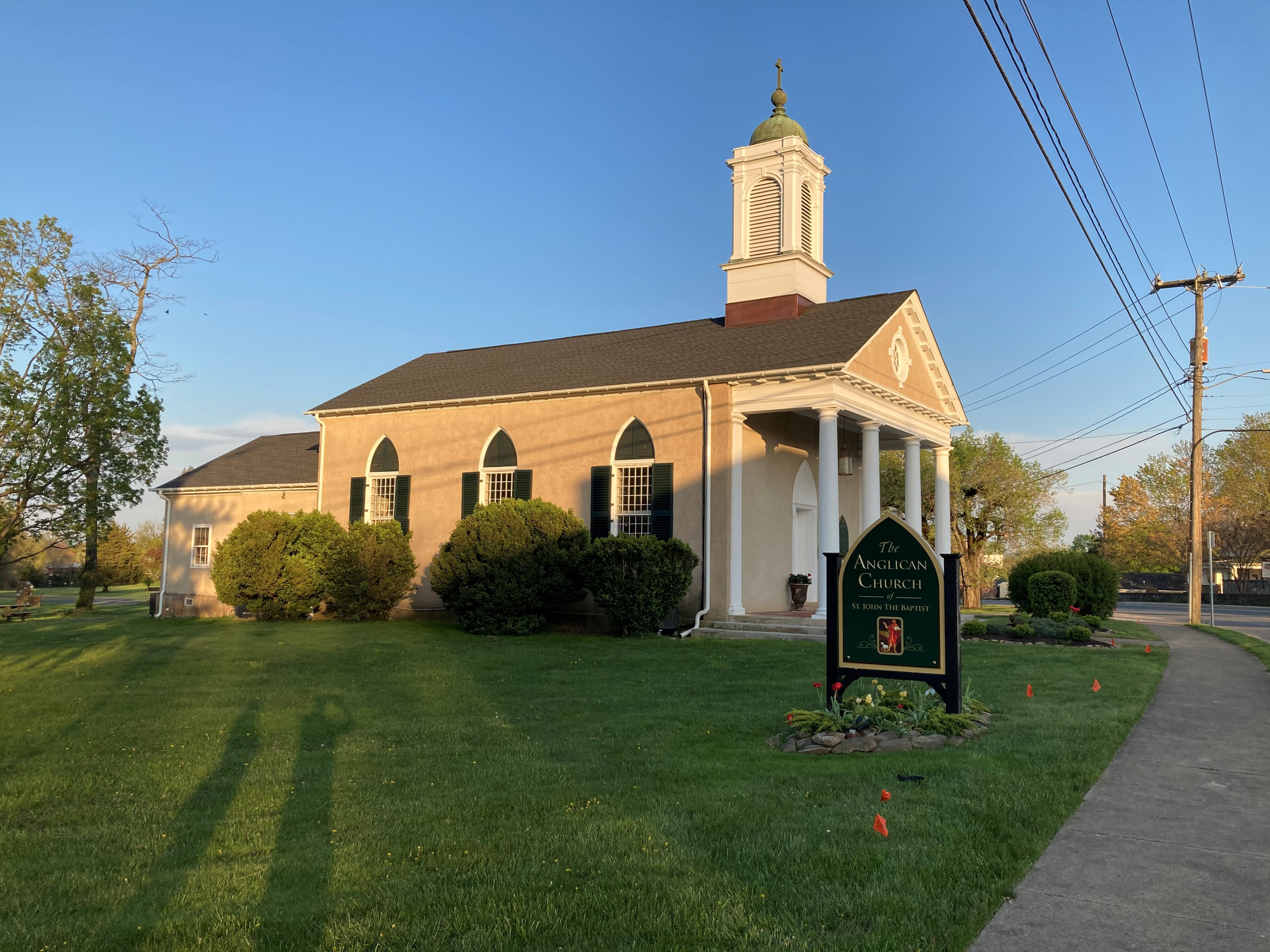
Trinity Episcopal Church (built in 1849) in Marshall, Virginia, currently leased to the Anglican Church of St. John the Baptist (Diocese of the Holy Cross)

The diocese currently has 20 parishes and missions in 10 U.S. states.

== Leadership ==
The current bishop of the Diocese of the Holy Cross is Paul Hewett, SSC, who was consecrated on December 4, 2004. Hewett had been a priest in the Episcopal Church until 1978, when he was deposed for aligning with Albert Chambers and the Continuing Anglican movement. Bishop Hewett's father, the Rev. Clayton Hewett had also been an early supporter of the Continuing Anglican Movement. Bishop Hewett is based at the Anglican Cathedral Church of the Epiphany, Columbia, South Carolina. The assisting bishop is Timothy Farmer, former rector of St. Francis' Church, Spartanburg, South Carolina. Until his death in 2009, Patrick Murphy served as retired bishop in residence and rector of St. Peter's Anglican Church in Houston, Texas.

=== Standing Committee ===
The bishop is assisted by a Standing Committee consisting of clergy and laypersons.

Its members currently consist of:

- The Rt. Rev'd Paul C. Hewett, SSC, Ordinary
- The Rev'd. Canon John A. Needham, SSC, President
- The Very Rev'd. Zachary Braddock, SSC
- The Rev'd. Thomas L Monnat
- The Rev'd. Canon Jonathan J D Ostman, SSC
- Mr George O Hillard III
- Mr Rick Hubbard
- Dr. Steven Prewitt
- Mr. William Talbott

== Anglican Fellowship of the Delaware Valley ==
The Anglican Fellowship of the Delaware Valley, so named because it encompassed Anglican churches and missions within the Delaware Valley, was formed in 2003 and was led by Bishop Paul C. Hewett. It was an association of Anglican churches in Pennsylvania, Delaware, and New Jersey that subscribed to the Affirmation of St. Louis and affiliated with Forward in Faith-UK. In 2005, the Anglican Fellowship of the Delaware Valley sponsored the conference The Affirmation of St. Louis: Seeking a Path to Reconciliation and Unity, which brought together traditionalists in the Episcopal Church and members of the continuing movement to discuss a path to jurisdictional unity. The Fellowship continues to organize local events. Alice C. Linsley gave a lecture on April 19, 2023 titled "How the Binary Reasoning of the Bible Informs Christian Morality and Ethics."

== News ==
The official newsletter, the Fortnightly, is published bi-weekly by Bishop Hewett.

== Bibliography ==
- Hewett, Paul C. (2020). The Day-spring from on High. ISBN 978-1647535513
- Hewett, Paul C. (2021). A Mighty Salvation: Cathedral Sermons. ISBN 978-1647536343
- Hewett, Paul C. (2021). To Perform the Mercy: Notes on the Liturgy of the 1928 Book of Common Prayer and the 1940 Hymnal and the Canons of the Diocese of the Holy Cross. ISBN 978-1647536572
