= Philippine Independent Catholic Church =

Independent Catholic denomination in the Philippines

International Conference of Philippine Independent Catholic Churches of Jesus Christ
- Iglesia Catolica Filipina Independiente
- Abbreviation: ICPICCJC, ICFI
- Type: Christian (Western)
- Classification: Catholicism, Protestantism
- Orientation: Mix of Independent Catholic, Anglo-Catholic and Nationalist
- Scripture: Bible
- Theology: Chicago–Lambeth Quadrilateral, Jerusalem Declaration
- Polity: Episcopal
- Supreme bishop: Armando L. de la Cruz
- Provinces: 8 (Metro Manila; Northern Luzon; Eastern Visayas and Japan; Mindanao; United States; United Kingdom, European Union and Madagascar)
- Dioceses: 18
- Full communion: Anglican Church in North America
- Headquarters: Manila
- Founder: Macario V. Ga
- Origin: 1981
- Separated from: Philippine Independent Church
- Separations: Aglipayan Christian Church Inc. Legion of Mary (1995)
- Congregations: 3,000 (2000)
- Members: 1,000,000 (2000)
- Other name: Philippine Independent Catholic Church (before 2019)

The International Conference of Philippine Independent Catholic Churches of Jesus Christ, commonly known as the Philippine Independent Catholic Church (Iglesia Catolica Filipina Independiente, or ICFI), is an independent Catholic denomination based in the Philippines. It was formed in 1981 as an offshoot of the Philippine Independent Church (Iglesia Filipina Independiente, or IFI). Formed amid conflicts within the IFI, it was the largest of several splinter groups from the IFI in the 1980s, accounting for as much as 40% of IFI members. The conflicts were exacerbated by the participation of its bishops in the consecration of continuing Anglican bishops in the United States in the early 1980s over the objections of the Episcopal Church, a full communion partner of the IFI. It encompasses 18 dioceses across eight provinces, primarily in the Philippines. Estimates of its membership have varied widely, ranging from less than 53,000 to as many as three million according to its own reporting. Having subscribed to Anglican doctrinal statements and orders of ordained ministry, in 2024 the ICFI entered full communion with the Anglican Church in North America, which included several churches and dioceses that had left the Episcopal Church during the Anglican realignment.

== History ==
The Philippine Independent Church was riven by conflict during the 1970s. While the IFI remained in communion with the U.S.-based Episcopal Church (and drew its apostolic succession from Episcopal bishops starting in 1948), IFI missionary bishop Francisco Pagtakhan and two other IFI bishops participated in the consecrations of several bishops in the continuing Anglican movement that was breaking away from the Episcopal Church over the ordination of women, including bishops who would go on to found the Anglican Catholic Church, the Anglican Province of Christ the King and the United Episcopal Church of North America. These actions resulted in strained relations between the Episcopal Church and the IFI. The ICFI attributed the disagreement to the IFI's adoption of a revised constitution and canons in 1977 that its says embraced congregational polity and departed from the church's previous "Catholic ethos".

As a result of the conflict and disagreement within the IFI over Pagtakhan's participation in the consecrations, the church's synod did not re-elect Macario V. Ga as supreme bishop. Ga led about 40% of the IFI out of the church in 1981 to form what it called the Iglesia Catolica Filipina Independiente, or Philippine Independent Catholic Church. The ICFI was the largest of several churches to split from the IFI during the 1980s.

In 1981, Pagtakhan along with bishops Sergio Mondala and Lupe Rosete conditionally consecrated several more Anglican continuum bishops due to concerns that their consecration history was irregular. They consecrated Tony Clavier, Walter Grundorf and Raymond Hanlan of the American Episcopal Church and Walter H. Adams, John Hamers and Frank Benning of the Anglican Episcopal Church.

During the 1990s, Ga and some of his followers returned to the IFI. In 2000, the IFI sued and sought a court order asking the ICFI to cease using the name "Philippine Independent Catholic Church", which the Aglipayan church claimed was a variant of its Securities and Exchange Commission-registered name. The SEC registration was revoked in 2003 and since 2019 the church has formally been registered as the International Conference of Philippine Independent Catholic Churches of Jesus Christ.

In 2004, on behalf of the ICFI, Supreme Bishop Armando L. de la Cruz endorsed Gloria Macapagal Arroyo in that year's presidential election. The ICFI entered full communion with the Anglican Church in North America in April 2024, with ACNA Archbishop Foley Beach and Bishops Ray Sutton and Mark Engel signing the concordat of communion alongside the ICFI bishops in Marikina.

== Doctrine and practices ==
According to the concordat of communion signed with the ACNA, the ICFI subscribes to the Chicago–Lambeth Quadrilateral and the Jerusalem Declaration, both Anglican formularies. It also subscribes to 20 articles originally adopted by the IFI in 1947 that outline the doctrine of the Trinity, Nicene Christology, soteriology, the Holy Scriptures. The church recognizes seven sacraments but holds that only two—baptism and the Eucharist are "generally necessary" for salvation. While the ICFI commends "reverent remembrance" of the saints, it rejects their "deification" and specifies that "[v]eneration of the Saints must not obscure the duty of the faithful to a direct approach to God through Jesus Christ".

The concordat states that the ICFI recognizes a threefold order of ordained ministry: bishops, priests and deacons, and it does not require clerical celibacy. The ICFI constitution and canons open ordination as priests and deacons to women, although the church says no ordinations of women have yet taken place as of 2024. The canons do not provide for women bishops.

== Structure ==
The ICFI is organized into eight provinces: Metro Manila; Northern Luzon; Eastern Visayas and Japan; Mindanao; United States; United Kingdom, European Union and Madagascar. The Philippine provinces collectively encompass 18 dioceses.

The ICFI is presided over by a supreme bishop (obispo supremo in Spanish). The first supreme bishop of the ICFI following its separation from the IFI was Macario V. Ga, who served until 1994, after which he reunited with the IFI. His successor as supreme bishop of the ICFI was Armando L. de la Cruz, who has served since 1994.

== Membership ==
There are inconsistent and highly variable estimates of the size of the ICFI. According to the 2001 edition of the World Christian Encyclopedia, the church had approximately one million adult members in 3,000 congregations. The 2020 Philippines census estimated that the church had 52,637 adherents, while in 2024 the ICFI claimed three million members.

== See also ==
- Anglican Rite Jurisdiction of the Americas
