= North American Anglican Conference =

The North American Anglican Conference (NAAC) was a federation of Continuing Anglican church bodies in the United States and Canada. It was founded on August 15, 2008, by an assembly of bishops, clergy, and laity gathered in Romulus, Michigan, for the purpose of ratifying the association's proposed statement of principles.

According to its constituting declaration, the North American Anglican Conference is not intended to be a first step towards a merger of member churches, but exists for the purposes of Anglican churches and clergy working together in support of Evangelism, for fellowship, and for the "transmission of Holy Orders, especially for the Episcopate."

In November, 2009 four bishops of NAAC cooperated in the consecration of David Pressey as bishop suffragan of the Anglican Episcopal Church. The ceremony took place in Mariner's Church, Detroit, famous for its annual memorial services for seamen lost on the Great Lakes and for being referred to in Gordon Lightfoot's ballad about the wreck of the Edmund Fitzgerald.

The members of the North American Anglican Conference were the Anglican Episcopal Church, with parishes in California, Arizona, Nevada, Florida, and Alabama, and the Diocese of the Great Lakes with parishes in Michigan. The bishop of the Anglican Diocese of Texas signed the NAAC statement of principles in 2010.

The impetus behind the establishment of the NAAC, however, was not a perceived need for inter-Anglican cooperation in general. Rather, it was the founding churches' belief that many of the world's Anglican churches have deteriorated in recent years because of liberal trends. The NAAC points to the "abandonment of Holy Scripture", "non-compliance" with the rubrics and spirit of the Book of Common Prayer (1928), and the redefining of the meaning of the Thirty-nine Articles of Religion by both liberal and some Anglo-Catholic jurisdictions as a reason for "Biblically-based Anglican bodies" to stand and work together.

The Anglican Episcopal Church and the Diocese of the Great Lakes have since become part of the United Episcopal Church of North America.

== See also ==
- Evangelicalism
- Low church
