= Federation of Anglican Churches in the Americas =

Association of Christian churches

Logo of the Federation of Anglican Churches in the Americas.

The Federation of Anglican Churches in the Americas (FACA) was an association of six Continuing Anglican jurisdictions with nearly 600 parishes in the Americas. The Federation, which was founded in 2006 to enable a closer association of these and other jurisdictions, did not include any provinces of the Anglican Communion. The patron of FACA was Presiding Bishop Gregory Venables of the Anglican Church of South America. Member churches included the Anglican Church in America, the Anglican Mission in the Americas, the Anglican Province of America, the Diocese of the Holy Cross, the Episcopal Missionary Church and the Reformed Episcopal Church. FACA members agreed to "hold to the primacy of Holy Scripture, the Ecumenical Creeds and Councils, adhere to the Thirty-Nine Articles of Religion, and the principles of the Chicago-Lambeth Quadrilateral." Members cooperated in federation while each used its own version of the Book of Common Prayer and exercised its own autonomy. By 2026, FACA had been dissolved.
