= Continuing Anglican movement =

Groups outside the Anglican Communion

The Continuing Anglican movement, also known as the Anglican Continuum, encompasses a number of Christian churches, principally based in North America, that have an Anglican identity and tradition but are not part of the Anglican Communion. These churches generally believe that traditional forms of Anglican faith and worship have been unacceptably revised or abandoned within some churches of the Anglican Communion, but that they, the Continuing Anglicans, are preserving or "continuing" both Anglican lines of apostolic succession and historic Anglican belief and practice. In 2014, Reuters reported that there were 400,000 members of the Traditional Anglican Communion, a communion of "Continuing Anglican" churches. In 2020, the World Christian Encyclopedia and World Christian Database estimated that there were approximately 2.4 million Anglicans among the churches "independent" of the Anglican Communion.

The term was first used in 1948 to describe members of the Church of England in Nandyal who refused to enter the emerging Church of South India, which united the Anglican Church of India, Burma and Ceylon with the Reformed (Presbyterian and Congregationalist) and Methodist churches in India. Today, however, the term usually refers to the churches that descend from the 1977 Congress of St. Louis, at which the foundation was laid for a new Anglican church in North America and which produced the Affirmation of St. Louis, which opens with the title "The Continuation of Anglicanism". Some church bodies that pre-date the Congress of St. Louis (such as the Free Church of England and the Reformed Episcopal Church), or are of more recent origin (such as the Church of England (Continuing), have referred to themselves as "Continuing Anglican" as they are traditional in belief and practice, though they did not emerge subsequent to the Congress of St. Louis.

The churches defined as "Continuing Anglican" are historically separate from GAFCON, comprising Confessing Anglican denominations such as the Anglican Church in North America, which is not a member of the Anglican Communion, though in literature GAFCON members have been referred to as "Continuing Anglican" in the sense that they seek to embody "conservative Anglicanism" or "Traditional Anglicanism".

== Relations with the Anglican Communion ==
Continuing Anglican churches were formed by clergy and laity who left churches belonging to the Anglican Communion. Continuing Anglican churches believe that those churches have been compromised by adopting secular cultural standards and liberal approaches to theology. Continuing Anglicans generally believe that the faith of some churches in communion with the Archbishop of Canterbury have become heterodox and even heretical, and therefore have not sought affiliation with the Anglican Communion. Although the term Anglican historically refers also to those churches in communion with the Church of England and the Archbishop of Canterbury, many Continuing churches, particularly those in the United States, use the term Anglican to differentiate themselves from the Episcopal Church of the United States, which they consider heterodox.

In 1978, Presiding Bishop John M. Allin released a statement with the Archbishop of Canterbury, Dr. Donald Coggan, that the Anglican Church formed from the consecrations performed by Bishop Chambers was in communion neither with the See of Canterbury, nor the Episcopal Church, nor the wider Anglican Communion. At the 1998 Lambeth Conference, Resolution IV.11, Continuing Churches, was added, which asked the Archbishop of Canterbury and the Primates' Meeting to consider how best to initiate and maintain dialogue with such groups with a view to the reconciliation of all who partake of the Anglican tradition.

== Theological unity and diversity ==
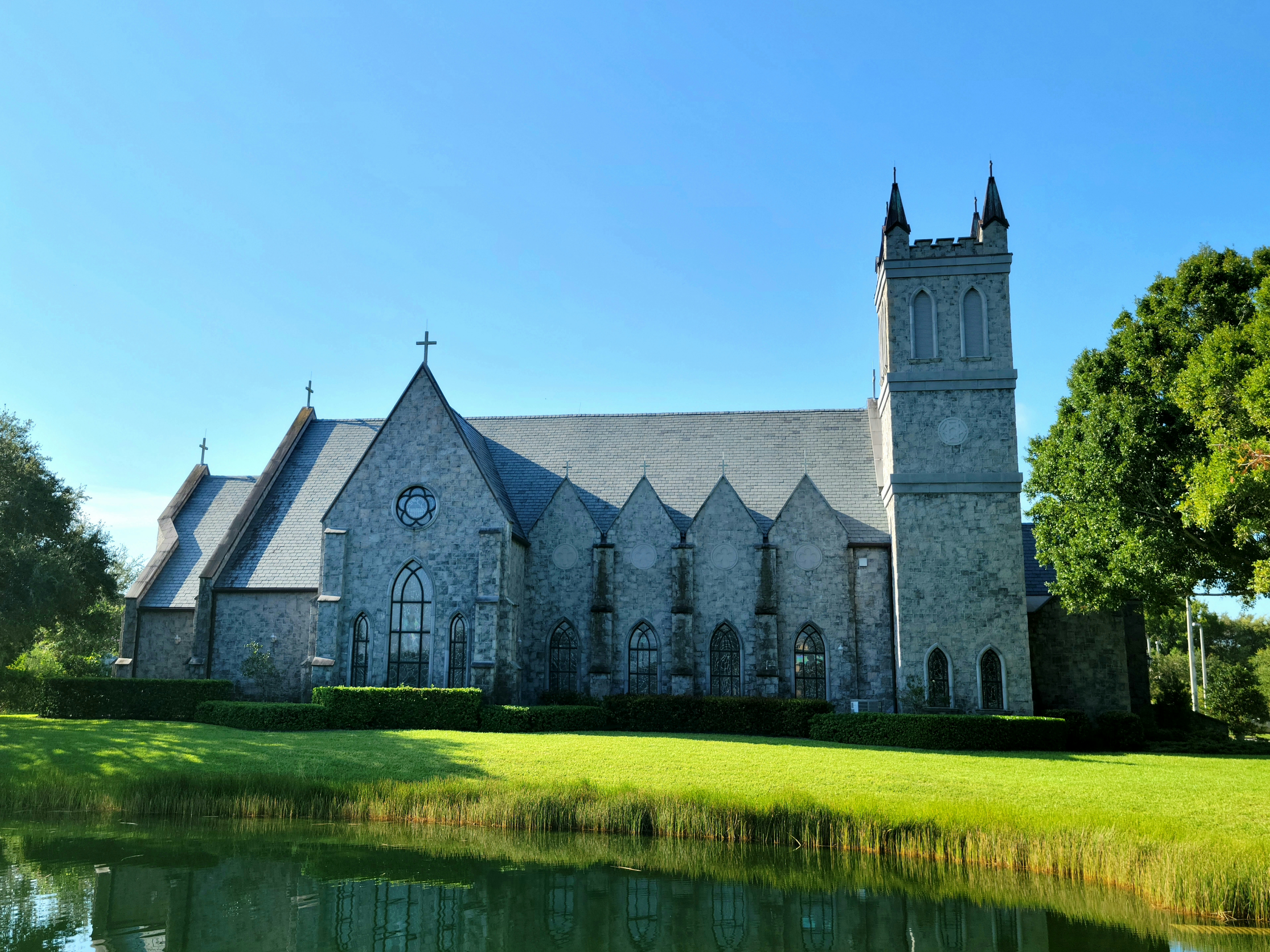
St. Mark's Anglican Church, Vero Beach, Florida, is a parish of the Diocese of the Eastern United States in the Anglican Province of America.

Anglicanism in general has historically viewed itself as a via media between the Protestant tradition and the Roman Catholic tradition, and after the Oxford Movement, certain clerics have sought a balance of the emphases of Catholicism and Protestantism, while tolerating a range of expressions in evangelicalism and ceremony. Clergy and laity from all Anglican churchmanship traditions have been active in the formation of the Continuing Anglican movement.

There are high church, broad church, and low church Continuing Anglican jurisdictions. Some are Anglo-Catholic with richly ceremonial liturgical practices, such as the Anglican Province of Christ the King, the Anglican Catholic Church, the Anglican Province of America, and the Anglican Church in America. Others that belong to the Reformed Anglican tradition, such as the United Episcopal Church of North America, support the Thirty-Nine Articles and, in some parishes, alternate Morning Prayer with Holy Communion.

The Continuing churches in the United States reject the 1979 revision of the Book of Common Prayer by the Episcopal Church (United States) and instead use the American 1928 version, or earlier official versions of the Book of Common Prayer, for their services.

The liturgical use of the 1611 Authorized Version of the Bible (known in the United States as the King James Version) is also a common feature. This is done for many reasons, including aesthetic preferences and theological opposition to what the churches regard as liberal or progressive theology, which is said to characterize some more recent translations.

The Affirmation of St. Louis—adopted at the Congress of St. Louis (September 14–16, 1977) by over 2000 bishops, clergy, and laypeople—and to a lesser extent the Thirty-nine Articles of Religion and The Books of Homilies serve as standards of faith and unity for most Continuing churches.

== History ==
=== Origins ===
The Continuing Anglican movement originated in the Episcopal Church in the United States of America and the Anglican Church of Canada. Related churches in other countries were founded later.

In 1976, the General Convention of the Episcopal Church in the United States of America voted to approve the ordination of women to the priesthood and the episcopate, and also provisionally adopted a new and doctrinally controversial Book of Common Prayer, later called the 1979 version. During the following year, several thousand dissenting clergy and laypersons responded to those actions by meeting in St. Louis, Missouri, under the auspices of the Fellowship of Concerned Churchmen, where they adopted a theological statement, the Affirmation of St. Louis of 1977. The Affirmation expressed a determination "to continue in the Catholic Faith, Apostolic Order, Orthodox Worship, and Evangelical Witness of the traditional Anglican Church, doing all things necessary for the continuance of the same".

Out of this meeting came a new church with the provisional name "Anglican Church in North America (Episcopal)". The first bishops of the new church, later named the Anglican Catholic Church, were consecrated on January 28, 1978, in Denver, Colorado. The main Continuing Anglican churches claim apostolic succession, originating from The Episcopal Church from before the date of ordination of women to the priesthood. It is also stated that there are Old Catholic and Polish National Catholic Church consecrations in the line of succession.

In Denver, the first bishop of the new church, Charles Dale David Doren, formerly an Archdeacon of the Diocese of Daejon in South Korea, was consecrated by The Rt. Rev. Albert Arthur Chambers, formerly the Episcopal Church's Bishop of Springfield (PECUSA #588) and Acting Metropolitan of the ACNA.

Joining Bishop Chambers in the consecration of Doren was The Rt. Rev. Francisco de Jesús Pagtakhan of the Philippine Independent Catholic Church. Letters of Consent and Desire for the Doren consecration were in hand from The Rt. Rev. Mark Pae (Taejon, Korea) and The Rt. Rev. Charles Boynton. Originally, a minimum of four consecrating bishops was sought, following the precedent of PECUSA. However, Bishop Boynton did not attend due to ill health. Bishop Pae reportedly intended to be present, but upon the release of his name, the Archbishop of Canterbury ordered him not to attend. The canonicity of the third consecrator by letter of written consent was defended at the consecration. The newly consecrated Charles Doren then joined with Chambers and Pagtakhan in consecrating as bishops James Orin Mote, Robert S. Morse, and Peter Francis Watterson. Watterson left the movement shortly afterward and became a Roman Catholic priest.

What had provisionally been called the Anglican Church in North America (Episcopal), was renamed the Anglican Catholic Church at the constitutional assembly in Denver, October 18–21, 1978. "Anglican Catholic Church" had previously been considered as a possible alternative name of the Protestant Episcopal Church USA before the decision to adopt the name by which it is commonly known, The Episcopal Church. The new church continued to appeal to disaffected Episcopalians to join. Some parishes of The Episcopal Church attempted to join the Anglican Catholic Church with their church building and property, leading to numerous court challenges. Only a few parishes were able to retain their property outright, such as St. James, Cleveland. By 1985, it was estimated that up to 20,000 people had left the Episcopal Church for the newly formed Anglican Catholic Church.

=== Early fractures and realignment ===
During the process of ratifying the new church's constitution, disputes developed that split its dioceses into two American churches and a separate Canadian church. These were the Anglican Catholic Church led by James Orin Mote, the Diocese of Christ the King (now the Anglican Province of Christ the King) led by Robert S. Morse, and the Anglican Catholic Church of Canada. In 1981, Charles Doren and others left the Anglican Catholic Church to found the United Episcopal Church of North America in opposition to the alleged inhospitality of the other jurisdictions towards low churchmen.

In 1983, a statement of unity led to the coalescence of the Anglican Catholic Church. In 1984 a portion of the Anglican Episcopal Church of North America merged with the ACC to become the non-geographical Diocese of St. Paul.

Some Continuing Anglican bishops began discussing forming an international communion of Continuing Anglican churches in 1988, and met in 1989 to form the Traditional Anglican Communion. In 1991, multiple Anglican jurisdictions were invited to attend a conference in October in Deerfield Beach, Florida, to create a united church. The United Episcopal Church of North America and the Diocese of Christ the King declined to participate. At that meeting, a number of parishes left the Anglican Catholic Church to merge with the American Episcopal Church and form the Anglican Church in America as a part of the Traditional Anglican Communion. Some of those later formed the Anglican Province of America after the resignation of Bishop Anthony F. M. Clavier as bishop ordinary of Diocese of the Eastern United States (ACA) in 1995. In 1997, additional parishes left the Anglican Catholic Church and formed the Holy Catholic Church (Anglican Rite).

In 1999, Bishop Richard Boyce requested membership in the Anglican Province of America as the Diocese of the West. In 2003, the Anglican Rite Synod in the Americas (ARSA) under Bishops Larry Shaver (formerly of the American Episcopal Church and the Anglican Jurisdiction of the Americas) and Herbert M. Groce were received into the Anglican Province of America as the non-geographical Diocese of St. Augustine, later renamed the Diocese of Mid-America.

On March 5, 2003, Ash Wednesday, the Diocese of the Holy Cross seceded from the Anglican Province of Christ the King over questions surrounding James Provence, the successor of Robert S. Morse. On July 25, 2007, Bishop Rocco Florenza and most of the parishes in the Eastern Diocese of the Anglican Province of Christ the King withdrew, joining the Anglican Church in America.

The 2007/08 Directory of Traditional Anglican and Episcopal Parishes, published by the Fellowship of Concerned Churchmen, contained information on over 900 parishes affiliated with either the Continuing Anglican churches or the Anglican realignment movement.

=== International growth ===
Some Continuing Anglican bodies have added dioceses outside North America. The two largest international jurisdictions are the Traditional Anglican Church and the Anglican Catholic Church. The Traditional Anglican Church comprises national provinces with dioceses, parishes and missions in Australia, Canada, Colombia, El Salvador, Great Britain, Guatemala, India, Ireland, South Africa, the United States, Venezuela, Zambia, and Zimbabwe.

The Anglican Catholic Church has a presence on six continents and nearly two dozen countries. In 1984, the five dioceses of the Church of India (CIPBC) were received by the Anglican Catholic Church and constituted as its second province, but they rescinded communion between 2013 and 2017 over matters relating to the status of the second province and became independent. In 2018, Archbishop Mark Haverland and the Most Rev. John Augustine, Metropolitan of the CIPBC, signed an agreement restoring communio in sacris. In September 2021, by a vote of the provincial synod of the Anglican Catholic Church, a third province, the Province of Southern Africa, was established, comprising five dioceses in South Africa and the one diocese in Zimbabwe. The Province now constitutes eleven dioceses, including one diocese in Tanzania.

The Anglican Province of America also includes global partnerships, with links to congregations in Ecuador, Haiti, India, and the Philippines.

== Reunification efforts ==
Procession of clergy from three Continuing Anglican churches: the Anglican Catholic Church, the Anglican Province of Christ the King, and the United Episcopal Church of North America

Grassroots partnerships have been formed between parishes in geographical regions. The Anglican Fellowship of the Delaware Valley, so named because it encompassed Anglican churches and missions within the Delaware Valley, was formed in 2003 and was led by Bishop Paul C. Hewett of the Diocese of the Holy Cross. It was an association of Anglican churches in Pennsylvania, Delaware, and New Jersey that subscribed to the Affirmation of St. Louis and affiliated with Forward in Faith-UK. In 2005, the Anglican Fellowship of the Delaware Valley sponsored the conference The Affirmation of St. Louis: Seeking a Path to Reconciliation and Unity, which brought together traditionalists in the Episcopal Church and members of the continuing movement to discuss a path to jurisdictional unity. In 2006, representatives from seven Anglican churches announced the formation of Common Cause Appalachia, an alliance of Anglican churches in the Appalachian area of the southeastern United States, to which some continuing Anglican churches in Georgia, Kentucky, North Carolina, and Tennessee belonged.

In September 2004, Bishops and clergy of the Anglican Catholic Church (ACC), the Anglican Province of Christ the King (APCK), and the Anglican Church in America (ACA), together with some clergy of Forward in Faith, made a joint pilgrimage to the tomb of Bishop Charles Grafton in Fond du Lac, Wisconsin.

=== ACC-APCK-UECNA ===
From 2003 to 2011, the Anglican Catholic Church, the Anglican Province of Christ the King, and the United Episcopal Church of North America (UECNA) explored opportunities for greater cooperation and the possibility of achieving organic unity. In 2003, Archbishop John-Charles Vockler of the ACC in a letter, called for prayers for healing of damaged relations between the ACC and the APCK. On May 17, 2007, Archbishop Mark Haverland of the ACC signed an intercommunion agreement negotiated with the United Episcopal Church of North America. In July, Archbishop Haverland published a statement on church unity, calling on UECNA and the APCK to join him in building "full organic unity". Bishop Presley Hutchens of the ACC addressed delegates at the UECNA convention in October 2008 and discussed the possibility of uniting the ACC and UECNA. Although well received at the time, there was a feeling among many of the delegates that the proposal was being rushed, and that no proper consideration was being given to the theological, constitutional, and canonical issues thrown up by the move. In January 2009, one bishop from each jurisdiction consecrated three suffragan bishops in St. Louis, intending that they serve all three jurisdictions. Moves towards unity with the Anglican Catholic Church were referred for further discussion and subsequently stalled in 2011 by the decision of UECNA to remain an independent jurisdiction. The ACC rescinded intercommunion with UECNA in 2025 due to disagreements with actions by the Presiding Bishop of UECNA.

=== Approaches and responses to the Roman Catholic Church ===
One Continuing Anglican church body, the Traditional Anglican Communion (TAC), sought union with the Roman Catholic Church. In 2004, Archbishop John Hepworth of the TAC reported that based on eight years of dialogue, Rome could recognize the TAC as an Anglican church in full communion with the Holy See. In 2007, the TAC made a formal proposal to the Roman Catholic Church for admission into "full corporate and sacramental union" with that church in a manner that would permit the retention of some of its Anglican heritage. The Vatican announced on July 5, 2008, that it was giving serious consideration to appeals received from various Anglican groups seeking union with itself, observing that "the situation within the Anglican Communion in general has become markedly more complex". On October 29, 2009, the Congregation for the Doctrine of the Faith announced Pope Benedict XVI's intention to create a new type of ecclesiastical structure, called a "personal ordinariate", for groups of Anglicans entering into full communion with the See of Rome. The initial response to this announcement was not entirely positive.

On November 4, 2009, Pope Benedict XVI signed an apostolic constitution, Anglicanorum coetibus. The House of Bishops of the Anglican Church in America—the American province of the TAC—responded on March 3, 2010, voting unanimously to request acceptance under the personal ordinariate provision. Within months, however, a majority of the eight ACA bishops made known their opposition to the move, and the church declared its intention to remain a Continuing Anglican body. Difficulties with the conditions placed on TAC clergy and parishes, particularly in Canada, resulted in many in the Anglican Catholic Church of Canada to remain Anglicans.

The Most Rev. Mark Haverland (ACC) wrote a response to Anglicanorum coetibus, declining to participate. While the Most Rev. Walter H. Grundorf (APA) offered an initial cautious welcome of Rome's offer, there was no interest for the Anglican Province of America as an institution to join.

In 2012, the TAC College of Bishops met and formally accepted the resignation of Archbishop John Hepworth. Archbishop John Hepworth was officially dismissed from the TAC College of Bishops on October 10, 2012.

=== Common Cause Partnership ===
Through the Federation of Anglican Churches in the Americas, the Anglican Province of America was associated with the Common Cause Partnership, an organization seeking to unite various Anglican jurisdictions to form a new conservative province of the Anglican Communion in North America, but in January 2008 declined to become a full partner. When, in July 2008, the APA voted to delay a decision on its membership until a number of contentious issues were resolved in the Common Cause Partnership, including whether or not to accept the practice of ordaining women, the APA's Diocese of the West disaffiliated. It subsequently joined the Reformed Episcopal Church and, through her, the Common Cause Partnership. On March 4, 2009, the Anglican Province of America (APA) reorganized its Diocese of the West (DOW) with parishes that had chosen not to follow Richard Boyce out of the APA.

=== North American Anglican Conference and UECNA ===
The Anglican Episcopal Church and the Diocese of the Great Lakes formed the North American Anglican Conference for mutual assistance between "Biblical Anglican" churches. A suffragan bishop was consecrated for the Anglican Episcopal Church in late 2008 by its presiding bishop and three bishops of the Diocese of the Great Lakes. In July 2014, the Diocese of the Great Lakes, under Bishop David Hustwick, joined the UECNA as its diocese for the Great Lakes states and eastern Canada. In January 2015, a petition was received from Bishop George Conner of the Anglican Episcopal Church at the behest of that jurisdiction's standing committee asking for admission as a non-geographical diocese of the UECNA. This was granted on February 11, 2015.

=== Anglican Joint Synods – G-4 to G-3 ===
In January 2016, the Anglican Catholic Church, the Anglican Church in America, the Anglican Province of America, and the Diocese of the Holy Cross reached a formal accord. Forming the Anglican Joint Synods, a "Group of 4" churches, called the G-4, pursuing eventual corporate unity. A joint synod was planned for all four jurisdictions to discuss common mission and unity.

On October 6, 2017, the Anglican Church in America, the Anglican Catholic Church, the Anglican Province of America, and the Diocese of the Holy Cross signed a communio in sacris agreement at jointly held synods in Atlanta, Georgia, pledging to pursue full, institutional, and organic union.

On October 13, 2017, Archbishop Shane Janzen, then primate of the Traditional Anglican Communion and Metropolitan of the Anglican Catholic Church of Canada, together with Bishop Craig Botterill, released a statement expressing the hope that the "initiative will lead to further ecumenical dialogue, cooperation and reconciliation between and among the Continuing Anglican Churches around the world, as well as here in Canada".

In 2019, a joint mission and evangelism ministry called Continuing Forward was formed for these G-4 jurisdictions. All four were represented at a second joint synod held January 13–17, 2020 in Atlanta.

On September 23, 2021, the Diocese of the Holy Cross voted to join the Anglican Catholic Church as a non-geographical diocese, making the "Group of 4" a "Group of 3" (G-3) churches.

On February 16, 2022, the primates of the Anglican Province of America and the Traditional Anglican Church announced the establishment of a full communion agreement between the two traditional Anglican churches. On May 22, 2022, Rogation Sunday, the Anglican Province of America and the Traditional Anglican Church officially signed the agreement of full sacramental communion at Saint Barnabas Cathedral, Dunwoody, Georgia. At the 2023 Anglican Joint Synods, the House of Bishops of the Anglican Church in America resolved to seek "fullest unity possible with the Anglican Catholic Church while maintaining the integrity and unity of the Traditional Anglican Church." In October 2025, this was accomplished at a joint synod which merged the dioceses of the Anglican Church in America into the Anglican Catholic Church.

==== Dialogue with the Polish National Catholic Church ====
A dialogue between the G-3 (at the time, G-4) churches and the Polish National Catholic Church (PNCC) opened, resulting from the desire to restore the kind of intercommunion that the PNCC had shared with the Protestant Episcopal Church in the United States before 1978. The meetings began after representatives of the PNCC were invited and attended the Anglican Joint Synods of the G-4 in 2017. The dialogue has addressed various issues and ways the churches can continue to grow closer together and achieve unity.

The first official dialogue was held January 15, 2019, in Dunwoody, Georgia. The Jurisdictions of the G-4 were represented by their presiding bishops and archbishops from the Anglican Catholic Church, the Anglican Church in America, the Anglican Province of America, and the Diocese of the Holy Cross. Also in attendance was a bishop of the Anglican Catholic Church of Canada (ACCC). The PNCC was represented by three bishops, including Prime Bishop Anthony Mikovsky and Bishop Paul Sobiechowski, and two senior priests.

On July 28, 2020, the G-4/PNCC Ecumenical Dialogue Group met via Zoom.

On October 5–6, 2021, the G-3/PNCC Ecumenical Dialogue Group met at Holy Trinity Cathedral in Manchester, New Hampshire.

On March 15–16, 2022, the G-3/PNCC Ecumenical Dialogue Group met at the Anglican Cathedral of the Epiphany in Columbia, South Carolina.

G-3 representatives were also in attendance with the bishops of the PNCC at the 125th anniversary and General Synod of the Polish National Catholic Church in Scranton, Pennsylvania.

As a part of the ACC's worldwide efforts with the Union of Scranton, meetings have been held between the ACC Diocese of the United Kingdom and the Nordic Catholic Church, an Old Catholic denomination of High Church Lutheran patrimony.

On January 23–25, 2023, delegates of the G-3 and the PNCC met for their 7th Dialogue at St. Paul's Anglican Church (APA), Melbourne, Florida, and produced this statement:

We, the Bishops and members of the G-3 and the PNCC celebrate the anniversary of our Ecumenical Dialogue. We began our initial discussions on January 11, 2019 for the purpose of discussing God's will for our mutual journey in Christ.

Over the past four years, we have gathered for worship and sacred fellowship. We have grown to know each other as brothers in Christ, and committed ourselves to find ways we may work together for mutual support and the ever challenging task of becoming one.

Though we gratefully share the fullness of the Catholic faith, we are aware that the goal of unity may take many years. Nevertheless, we believe that our work together is essential to the fulfillment of God's will.

We will keep our Churches in prayer that our efforts may bear the necessary spiritual fruit and be ever pleasing to God.

==== Dialogue with the Lutheran Church-Missouri Synod ====
In May 2024, representatives of the G3 churches met with representatives of the Lutheran Church – Missouri Synod (LCMS) in St. Louis, Missouri. Continuing meetings were planned for the future for the purpose of both parties coming to understand the other better, and to form joint statements on pressing theological or moral matters.

== Churches ==
There have been occasional surveys of "orthodox" Anglican churches conducted by the Fellowship of Concerned Churchmen, with numbers reported from 2007 and 2011 and 2015.

The following is a list of denominations and dioceses worldwide that derive from the Congress of St. Louis and the January 28, 1978, consecrations.

=== North America ===
The approximate number of parishes and missions is shown in parentheses.

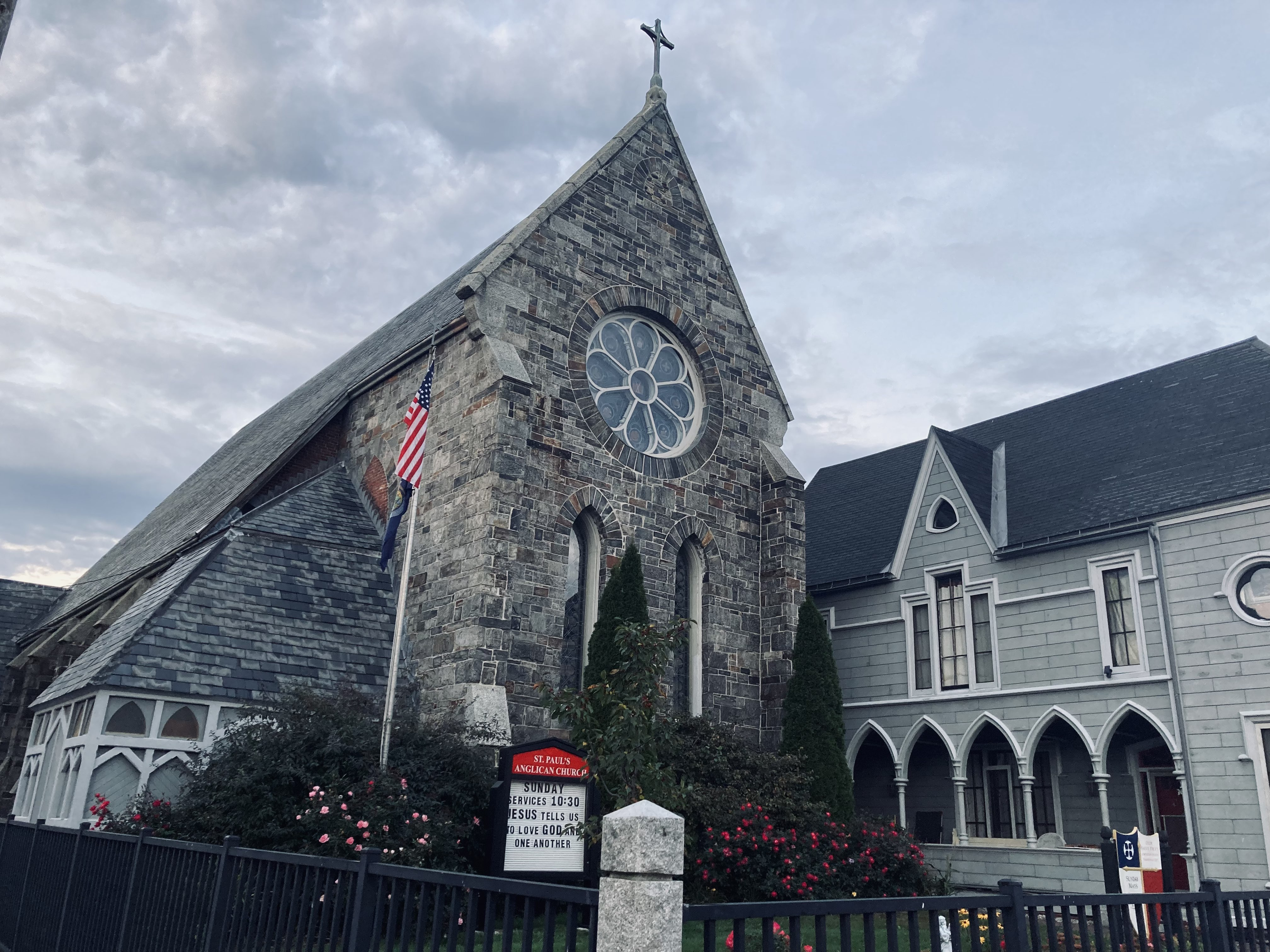
St. Paul's Anglican Church in Portland, Maine, a parish of the United Episcopal Church of North America

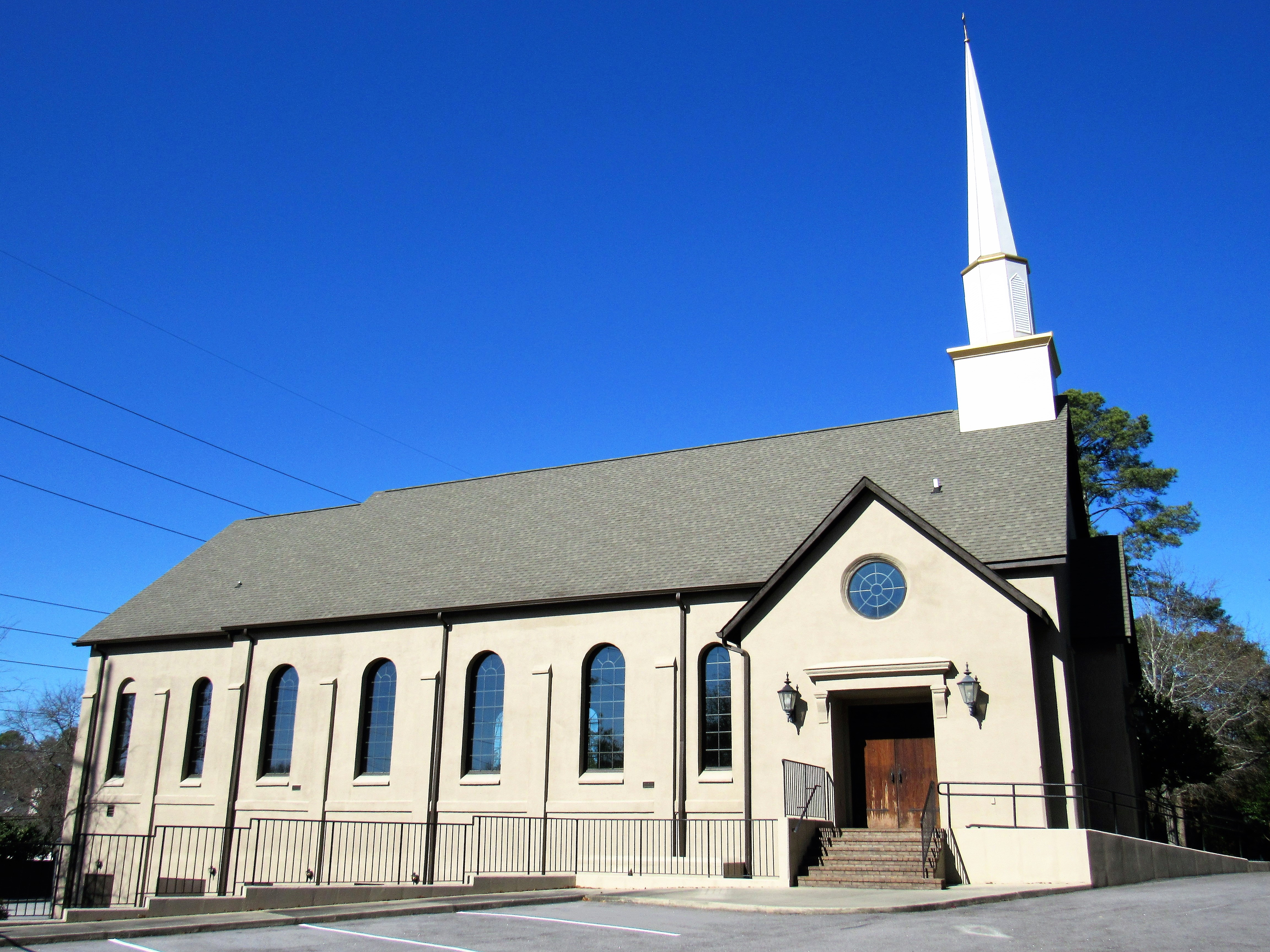
Cathedral Church of the Epiphany, Columbia, South Carolina, the cathedral parish of the Diocese of the Holy Cross

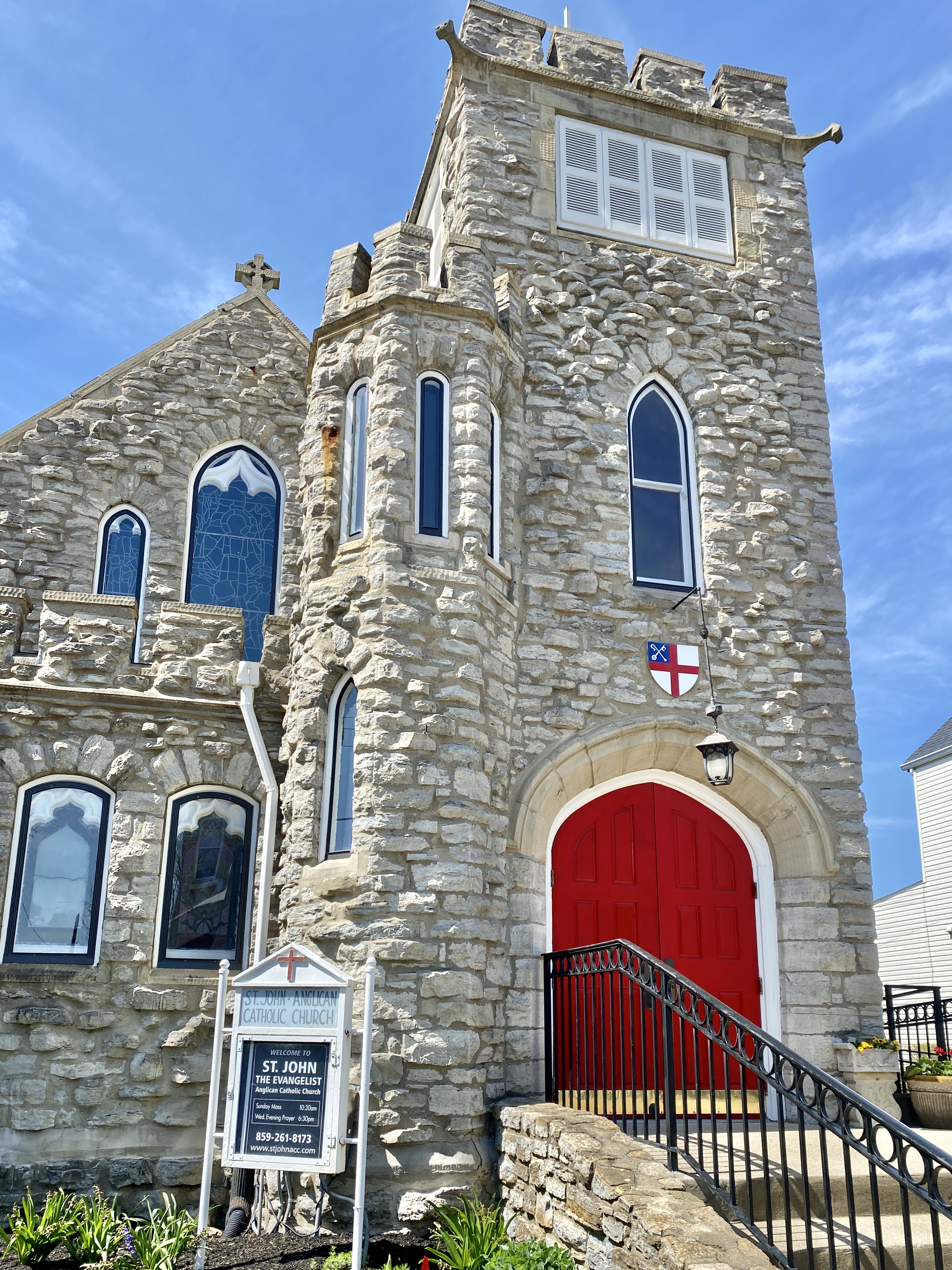
St. John's Anglican Catholic Church in Dayton, Kentucky, a parish of the Diocese of the Midwest of the Anglican Catholic Church

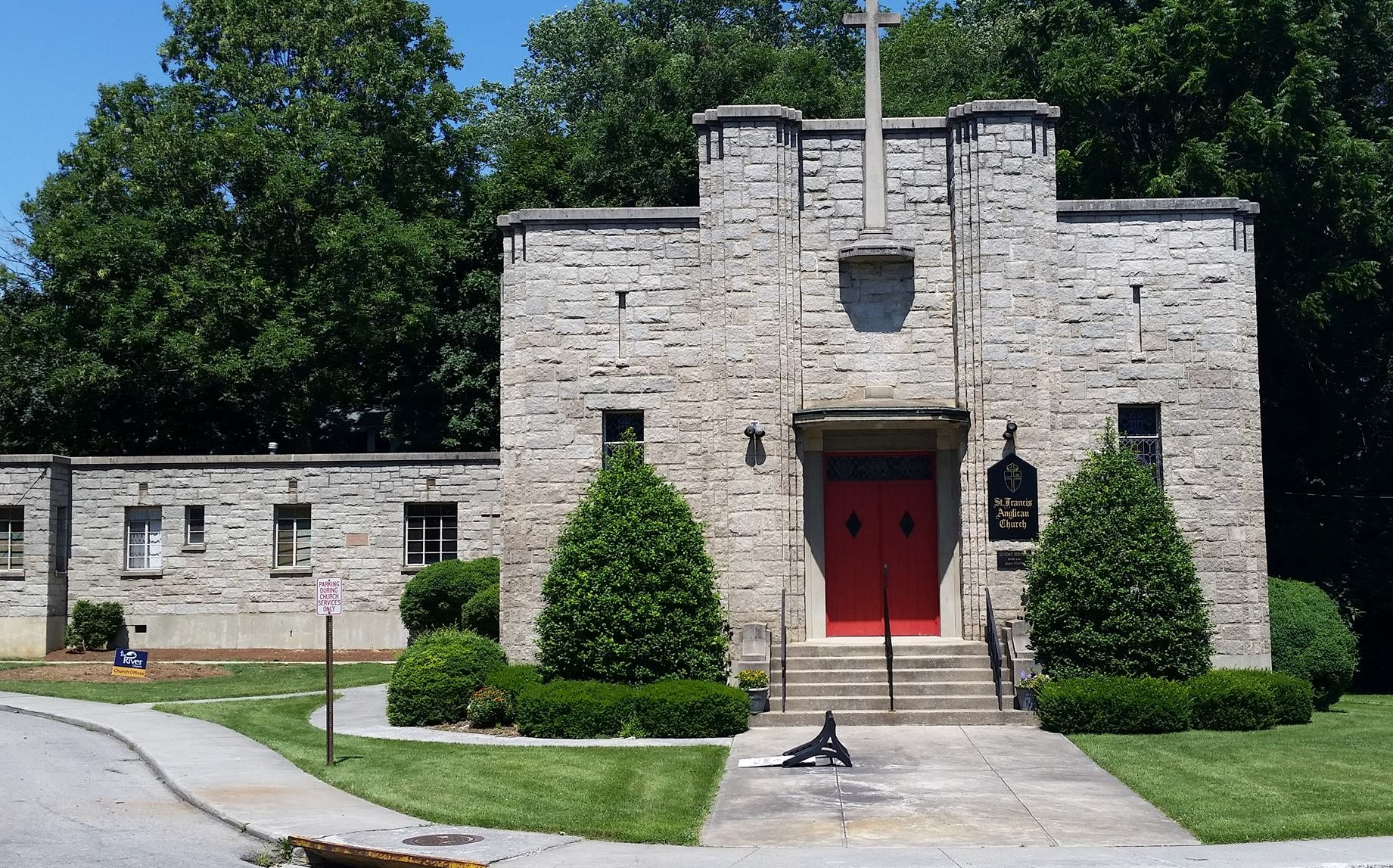
St. Philip's Anglican Church in Blacksburg, Virginia, a parish of the Diocese of the Eastern United States of the Anglican Province of America

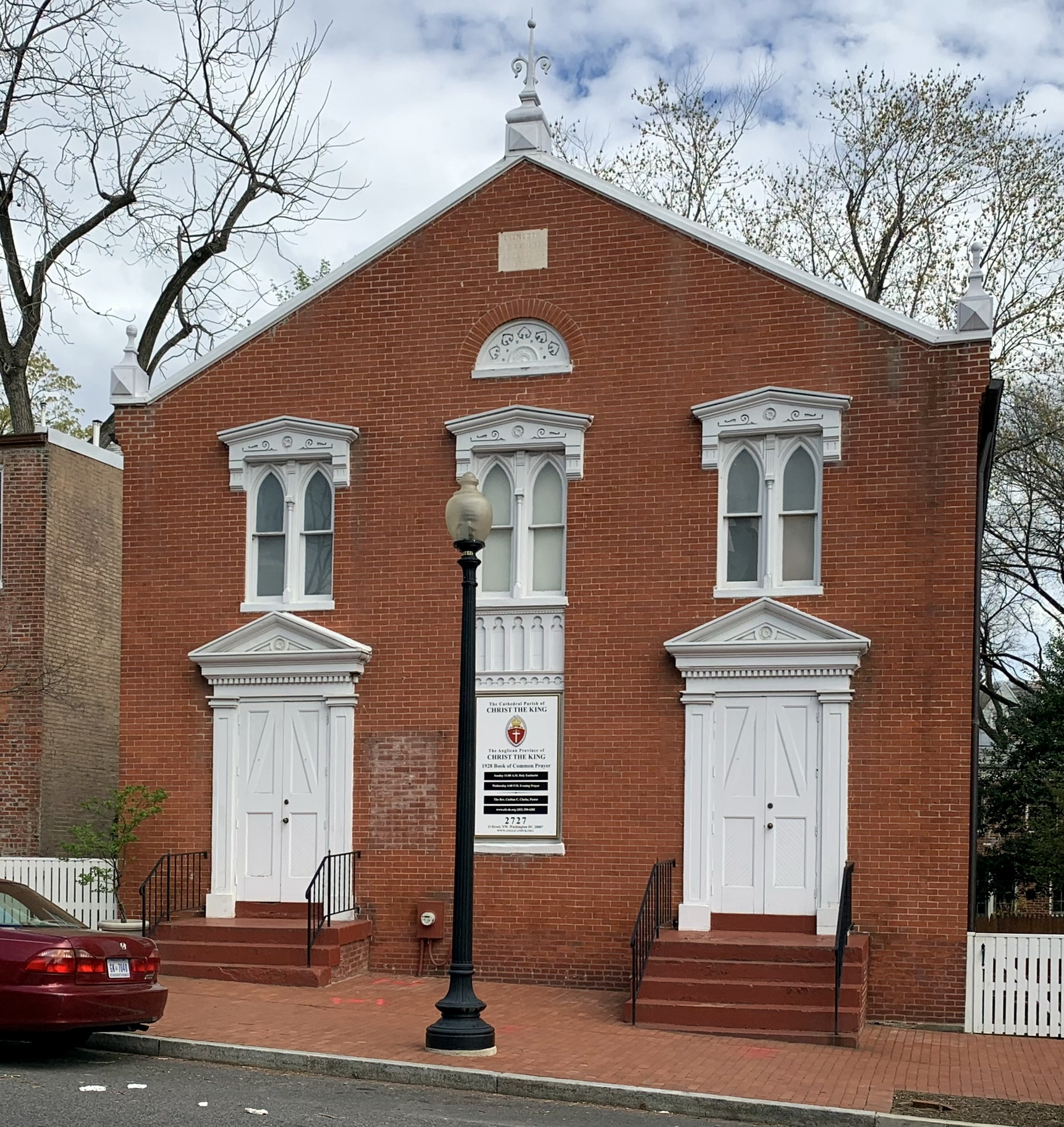
Anglican Parish of Christ the King in Georgetown, Washington, D.C., a parish of the Anglican Province of Christ the King

- Anglican Catholic Church (now including the formerly independent Diocese of the Holy Cross and the Anglican Church in America (TAC)) (154)
- Anglican Catholic Church of Canada (TAC) (12)
- Anglican Province of America (36)
- Anglican Province of Christ the King (34)
- Holy Catholic Church (Anglican Rite) (7)
- Traditional Anglican Church of Canada (ACC) (9)
- United Episcopal Church of North America (20)

=== South America and Caribbean ===
- Diocese of the New Grenada (Colombia, Venezuela, Chile and Brazil) (ACC)
- Indigenous Pastorale of the Anglican Province of America in Ecuador (APA)
- Missionary Diocese of the Caribbean (ACC)
- Traditional Anglican Church in Latin America (TAC)
- Diocese of Puerto Rico and the Caribbean (TAC)

=== Europe ===
- Church of England (Continuing)
- Church of Ireland – Traditional Rite (TAC)
- Deanery of Europe (ACC)
- Diocese of the United Kingdom (ACC)
- Traditional Anglican Church in Britain (TAC)

=== Africa ===
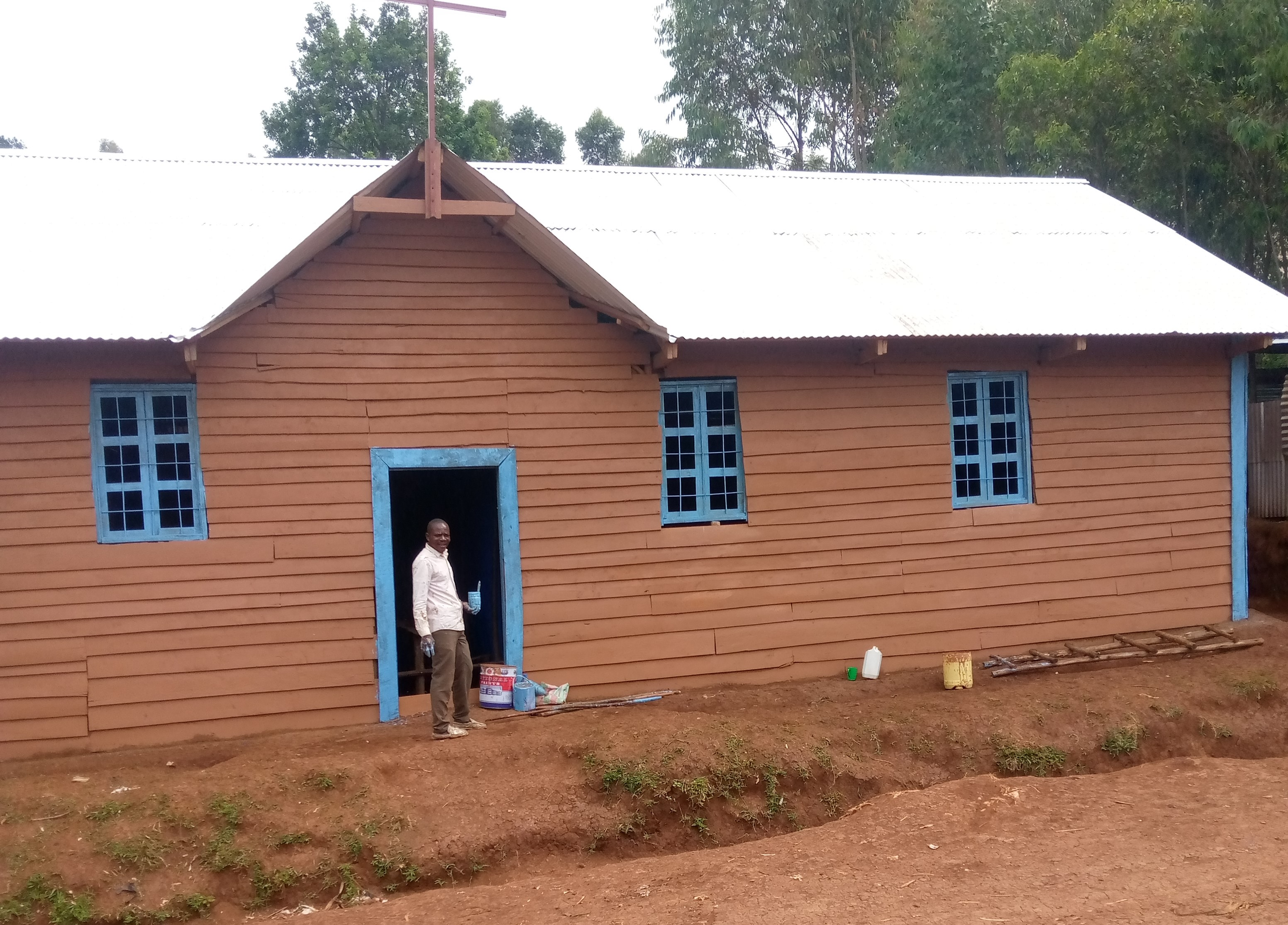
Saint Michel Bagira Mission in the city of Bukavu Province of South-Kivu, DRC, a parish of the Diocese of Congo of the Anglican Catholic Church

- Anglican Church in Southern Africa (TAC)
- Continuing Anglican Church in Zimbabwe (TAC)
- Diocese of the Aweil (Sudan) (ACC)
- Diocese of Cameroon (ACC)
- Diocese of Christ the Redeemer (South Africa) (ACC)
- Diocese of Congo (South Kivu (exclusive Fizi, Uvira and Mwenga), North Kivu, Central, West, North and South) (ACC)
- Diocese of Kenya (ACC)
- Missionary Diocese of Eastern Congo (Fizi, Uvira and Mwenga) (ACC)
- Missionary Diocese of Rwanda (ACC)
- Missionary Diocese of the West (South Africa) (ACC)
- Province of Southern Africa (ACC)
  - Diocese of Kei
  - Missionary Diocese of Ekurhuleni
  - Missionary Diocese of Saint Paul
  - Missionary Diocese of Vaal
  - Missionary Diocese of Johannesburg
  - Diocese of Christ the King
  - Diocese of Zimbabwe
  - Diocese of Port Elizabeth
  - Diocese of East London
  - Missionary Diocese of Qumbu
  - Diocese of Tanzania
  - Patrimony of the North West (South Africa)
  - Patrimony of the Western Cape
- Traditional Anglican Church in Zambia (TAC)

=== Asia ===
- Anglican Church of India – CIPBC (TAC)
- Church of India-CIPBC (ACC)
- Diocese of Lahore (Pakistan) (ACC)
- Anglican Church in America (ACA) Deanery of Indonesia

=== Oceania ===
- Church of the Torres Strait (TAC)
- Missionary Diocese of Australia and New Zealand (ACC)
- Missionary Diocese of the Philippines (ACC)
- Traditional Anglican Church in Australia (TAC)

=== Other Continuing Anglican churches ===
Other church bodies commonly called "Continuing Anglican" were founded independently of the Continuing Anglican movement of the 1970s, some before and others later. Among the older ones are the Free Church of England (the first congregations of which were founded in 1844), the Reformed Episcopal Church (founded in 1873), the Orthodox Anglican Church (founded in 1963 as the Anglican Orthodox Church), and the Southern Episcopal Church (founded in 1965).

North American communities that fall into this category (with approximate number of congregations) are:

- Reformed Episcopal Church (119)
- Episcopal Missionary Church (10)
- Orthodox Anglican Church (9)
- Independent Anglican Church Canada Synod (7)
- Christian Episcopal Church of North America (6)
- Anglican Orthodox Church (6)
- Southern Episcopal Church (3)
- Reformed Anglican Church (2)
- American Anglican Church
- United Anglican Church

Communities in other regions:

- Anglican Church of India
- Reformed Evangelical Anglican Church of South Africa

=== Defunct churches ===
Other American churches that emerged from the jurisdictions derived from the Congress of St. Louis, then merged with existing jurisdictions or otherwise ceased:

- American Episcopal Church (1970–1991)
- Anglican Episcopal Church of North America (1972–1984)
- Anglican Rite Jurisdiction of the Americas (1981–1994)
- Anglican Rite Synod in the Americas (1993–2003)
- Anglican Rite Synod of America
- Anglo-Catholic Church in the Americas (2000–2009)
- Traditional Protestant Episcopal Church (1991–2011)
- Diocese of the Holy Cross (2003-2021)
- Anglican Church in America (TAC) (1991-2025)

== Affiliated educational institutions ==
=== Saint Joseph of Arimathea Theological College ===
Originally founded in 1952 by Robert S. Morse as the Episcopal Chaplaincy at Stanford University, it was renamed the St. Joseph of Arimathea Foundation in 1960. In 1964, the current location one block south of the University of California, Berkeley was purchased. Due to disagreements between Robert S. Morse and the current Episcopal bishop, James Pike, in 1963 Morse resigned as chairman but filled the Board with Orthodox and Catholic clergy, including Prince Vasili Romanov and the Very Rev. Alexander Schmemann. The St. Joseph's Student Center hosted Orthodox, Catholic, and Anglican services throughout the week. The chapel, also named for Saint Joseph of Arimethea, was built in 1975 and features a sixteenth century crucifix. Saint Joseph of Arimathea Anglican Theological College was founded in 1979 as a seminary for the newly formed Diocese of Christ the King. It continues to offer classes, in person and online, mostly for prospective clergy of the Anglican Province of Christ the King.

=== Holyrood Seminary ===
Holyrood Seminary was established by the Anglican Catholic Church in 1981 to address the shortage of priests in the newly formed church. The building purchased was former hospital in Liberty, New York. The building had previously been purchased in 1979 by St. Alban's Anglican Catholic Holyrood Seminary of Richmond, Virginia. The seminary produced many graduates who were ordained in the Anglican Catholic Church and other continuing churches. The seminary closed in 1998.

=== Saint Bede's Anglican Catholic Theological College ===
Saint Bede's Anglican Catholic Theological College was established in 2001 to serve the needs of the Anglican Catholic Church of Canada and Traditional Anglican Church as well as other Continuing Anglican Churches. It offers courses leading to Bachelor in Theology (B.Th.), Master of Divinity (M.Div.), or Master of Theological Studies (M.T.S) degrees. In 2018, Saint Bede's Anglican Catholic Theological College was accredited by Accreditation Service for International Schools, Colleges and Universities (ASIC). Based in Victoria, British Columbia, it also offers classes online.

== See also ==
- Anglican realignment
- Bartonville Agreement
- Federation of Anglican Churches in the Americas
- Continuing church
- Convergence Movement
- Independent sacramental movement
