= Anglican Rite Jurisdiction of the Americas =

The Holy Catholic Church, Anglican Rite Jurisdiction of the Americas (ARJA) was an Anglican traditionalist church originating in 1981 from within the Anglican Catholic Church (ACC) in the United States and with the assistance of the Philippine Independent Catholic Church (PICC), an offshoot of the mainline Philippine Independent Church. Citing political infighting within the Anglican Catholic Church, four of its clergy sought the help of the Philippine church in consecrating them to be bishops of a daughter province in which each of them would serve as bishop ordinary of a diocese covering one-quarter of the United States.

== History ==
In 1981, the PICC's ecumenical officer, Francisco J. Pagtakhan, consecrated three clergy in San Diego, California - Robert Q. Kennaugh of Texas, G. Wayne Craig of Ohio and Forrest Ogden Miller of California (the fourth candidate, Herman Nelson of Florida, asked for his consecration to be delayed - in 1985 he was received back into the ACC).

The Anglican Rite Jurisdiction of the Americas sought to consecrate bishops with valid orders in an unbroken lineage of apostolic succession (the PICC had Old Catholic Union of Utrecht orders) in order to serve the needs of conservative Episcopalians who objected to the revision of the 1928 Book of Common Prayer, to the ordination of women, and to the Episcopal Church's relaxation of traditional rules concerning marriage and sexuality. One of ARJA's hopes was to be a force for uniting other Continuing Anglican churches which had remained independent of the Anglican Catholic Church.

Of the initial three bishops of the church, Miller and Kennaugh are deceased, and Craig retired in 1987. Along with his former parish in Columbus, Ohio, he subsequently joined the Episcopal Missionary Church (EMC).

At its height, ARJA consisted of approximately a dozen parishes in the United States.

In 1987, ARJA gained a diocese in Australia, headed by Kenneth Graydon, and in 1993 after ARJA's Archbishop Stephen Clark had visited England, they jointly began a missionary Diocese of Lambeth in London. Before its demise, this latter had several successive episcopal visitors and was administered by an archdeacon who later converted to Orthodoxy.

When efforts to unite with other Continuing Anglican bodies repeatedly proved unsuccessful, and following the departure of most of its parishes to various other Continuing Anglican jurisdictions, the ARJA began conversations with the Episcopal Missionary Church. The EMC had been founded in the early 1990s by Donald Davies, a retired ECUSA bishop. The talks were successful and a merger of the remaining ARJA parishes and clergy was agreed upon. In 1994, the ARJA was dissolved and merged with the EMC.

== See also ==
- Christianity in the Philippines
