= Stephen C. Reber =

- Former Presiding Bishop
- Church: United Episcopal Church of North America
- In office: 1996 to 2010
- Predecessor: John C. Gramley
- Successor: Peter D. Robinson
- Previous post(s): Bishop Coadjutor, UECNA

Orders
- Consecration: 1996

Personal details
- Born: September 6, 1938 (age 86)

Stephen C. Reber Sr. of Statesville, North Carolina, is a former Presiding Bishop of the United Episcopal Church of North America (UECNA). Before being elected as Presiding Bishop of the UECNA, Reber had some years previously been a presbyter in the Anglican Orthodox Church and rector of St. Peter's Anglican Church in Statesville. He is married to Judy and is an avid Anglophile.

Reber served as the Presiding Bishop of the United Episcopal Church from late 1996 until 2010. During that time he drove many thousands of miles in the eastern and south central United States re-establishing the UECNA's presence in those areas. His initial inter-jurisdictional efforts focused on the Anglican Province in America, but after they signed an agreement with the Reformed Episcopal Church, he became disenchanted with that arrangement and refocused his thinking on better relations with the Anglican Catholic Church.

On September 6, 2010, Reber retired as the Archbishop/Presiding Bishop of the United Episcopal Church. He continued his ministry as the rector of All Saints' United Episcopal Church in Hillsborough, North Carolina, until the end of April 2014 at which point he retired completely from active ministry.

Religious titles
Preceded by John C. Gramley	Presiding Bishop of the United Episcopal Church of North America	Succeeded by Peter D. Robinson
