= Southern Episcopal Church =

American Anglican denomination

- Arms of the Southern Episcopal Church
- Classification: Anglican
- Presiding bishop: William Martin Sloane
- Origin: 1962
- Separated from: Episcopal Church in the United States
- Official website: southernepiscopal.us

The Southern Episcopal Church (SEC) is an Anglican Christian denomination established in Nashville, Tennessee in 1962, in reaction to liberal political and theological trends within the Episcopal Church USA. It is connected to the Continuing Anglican movement, although it was formed more than a decade before the movement began.

The SEC does not consider itself a new denomination, but rather as providing a church home for Episcopalians who wished to maintain their Anglican faith and tradition. It uses the 1928 Book of Common Prayer for its liturgy.

The leader of the initial group was Burnice Hoyle Webster, a medical doctor who became presiding bishop. The current presiding bishop is William Martin Sloane.

The SEC has one seminary, the Holy Trinity College and Seminary, which offers classes by distance studies.
