= American Anglican Church =

Continuing Anglican jurisdiction

- Abbreviation: AAC
- Classification: Protestant
- Orientation: Anglican (including Anglo-Catholic, High, Broad, Low, and Evangelical churchmanships)
- Scripture: Holy Bible
- Theology: Anglican Doctrine
- Polity: Episcopal
- Governance: Synodical
- Presiding Bishop: John Herzog
- Associations: Province of the Good Sheperd
- Full communion: United Anglican Church Province II
- Liturgy: Book of Common Prayer 1928 U.S. (official) Book of Common Prayer 1662 (authorized) Anglican Missal American Edition (authorized) English Missal (authorized)
- Headquarters: Holy Innocents Anglican Church, New York, United States (de facto headquarters)
- Territory: United States
- Origin: Late 1990s New York, United States
- Separations: St. Stephen's Independent Anglican Church (2018) St. John's Community Church (2019) St. Matthew's Anglican Church (2020)
- Official website: http://www.americananglicanchurch.org
- Slogan: Lord Direct Us

The American Anglican Church (AAC) is a Continuing Anglican jurisdiction that counts at present thirteen parishes and missions in North America. It was founded later in the history of the Continuing Anglican movement, ultimately deriving from controversies in the Episcopal Church. These were over the ordination of women to the priesthood, liberal or progressive theology, and a new revision of the Book of Common Prayer (1979). Holy Innocents Anglican Church in New York serves as the AAC headquarters.

== History ==
The American Anglican Church was founded as the product of an internal reorganization of the now defunct American Anglican Church of the Anglican Synod in the late 1990's, following unclear governance circumstances.

== Beliefs ==
The American Anglican Church is a product of the Continuing Anglican movement and its doctrines are generally within the orthodoxy of that movement. It summarizes its doctrine, discipline, and worship in its mission statement:

We believe the Holy Scriptures of the Old and New Testaments to be the Word of God; The Creeds (as the standard of faith) mean exactly what they say; Christian morality of the New Testament is the sole guide of faith and practice.

The denomination assents to the Affirmation of St. Louis, though was not organized at the time of the Congress of St Louis.

== St. Andrew's Institute of Theology ==
The American Anglican Church has one theological seminary. St. Andrew's Institute of Theology is an unaccredited seminary.

While not a correspondence school, there is no physical seminary facility. Instruction is decentralized, and course work and teaching feedback come through a tutor system governed by the church. While courses are open to anyone, the institute is primarily focused on training internal candidates for ordination.
