= Anglican Episcopal Church =

Continuing Anglican church

The Anglican Episcopal Church (AEC) was a Continuing Anglican church consisting of parishes in Arizona, Alaska, and Florida served by a presiding bishop and several other clergy. The AEC was founded at St. George's Anglican Church in Ventura, California.

The church described its faith as being based on the 1928 Book of Common Prayer, the King James Version of the Bible, and the Thirty-nine Articles of Religion. Now the AEC functions as a non-geographical Diocese of the United Episcopal Church of North America.

== History ==
The Anglican Episcopal Church's first bishop was Reginald Hammond (1918 to 2004). Hammond was consecrated for the Anglican Episcopal Church on 20 April 2000 by Robert J. Godfrey, a former presiding bishop of the Anglican Orthodox Church. The co-consecrators were: Richard Boyce of the Anglican Province of America and Scott McLaughlin, Hesbon Njera, and Thomas Shank, all of the Orthodox Anglican Church. Following Hammond's death on 5 May 2004, the church was reduced from three parishes to the one parish in Ventura which then voted to ask for the episcopal oversight of two bishops of the Anglican Diocese of the Good Shepherd: Melvin Pickering and George Connor.

In 2006, St. George's withdrew from its association with the Diocese of the Good Shepherd along with several other parishes. Delegates to an October 2006 General Convention which had been called for the purpose of re-establishing the Anglican Episcopal Church elected Conner to be its presiding bishop. David Pressey of St. George's parish was elected by the AEC Convention of 2008 to be a suffragan bishop. He was consecrated on 22 November 2008. In September 2014, St. George's withdrew from membership in the AEC and is currently an independent parish.

In 2008, the Anglican Episcopal Church entered into a close working association with the Diocese of the Great Lakes; both of these churches have since joined the United Episcopal Church of North America as dioceses of the UECNA.

This Anglican Episcopal Church is not to be confused with the Anglican Episcopal Church of North America founded in 1972 by Bishop Walter Hollis Adams (1907 to 1991), with the Anglican Episcopal Church, Celtic Rite which was founded in 1993 by Bishop Robert Harold Hawn (1928 to 1999), with the Anglican Episcopal Church International which was founded by Bishop Norman S. Dutton in 2008, or with the Anglican Episcopal Church of Europe which was founded more recently.
