= Robert S. Morse =

Robert Sherwood Morse (April 10, 1924 – May 28, 2015) was an American bishop who became the founding archbishop of the Anglican Province of Christ the King.

A 1950 graduate of Seabury-Western Theological Seminary, he was ordained to the diaconate on July 8, 1950, and to the priesthood on February 22, 1951.

An early organizer of the Congress of St. Louis, he was suspended from the Episcopal Church in 1977. In 1978 he became one of the four bishops consecrated by Albert Chambers in Denver, Colorado, forming the Continuing Anglican movement.

He founded the Anglican Province of Christ the King in 1977 and was a leader in the American Church Union.

Robert Morse founded the St. Joseph of Arimathea Theological College and remained as provost until his death. Originally founded as a college chaplaincy, Morse remained involved with students at the University of California, particularly the Men's Rowing Team.
