= Anglican Province of America =

American Continuing Anglican denomination

- Classification: Anglo-Catholic
- Orientation: Anglican
- Polity: Episcopal
- Presiding Bishop: Chandler Holder Jones, SSC
- Full communion: Anglican Catholic Church; Traditional Anglican Church; United Episcopal Church of North America; Reformed Episcopal Church
- Region: United States, Ecuador, India, Philippines, Haiti
- Headquarters: Dunwoody, Georgia, U.S.
- Origin: 1995; 31 years ago
- Congregations: ~36
- Members: ~ 6,000
- Official website: anglicanprovince.org

The Anglican Province of America (APA) is a Continuing Anglican church in the United States. The church was founded by former members of the Episcopal Church in the United States.

== History ==
In the 1960s, the Episcopal Church in the United States (ECUSA) increasingly involved itself with the civil rights movement. Some in the church began to question areas of ECUSA's involvement which seemed to them to be supporting radical causes. At the same time, revisions made in Roman Catholic liturgies caused many within the ECUSA leadership to champion an updating of the Episcopal Book of Common Prayer.

Opposition to these actions led to the founding of the American Episcopal Church (AEC) in March 1968. At a meeting held in Mobile, Alabama, it was agreed that a new body was needed in order to preserve traditional Anglicanism.

== Leadership ==
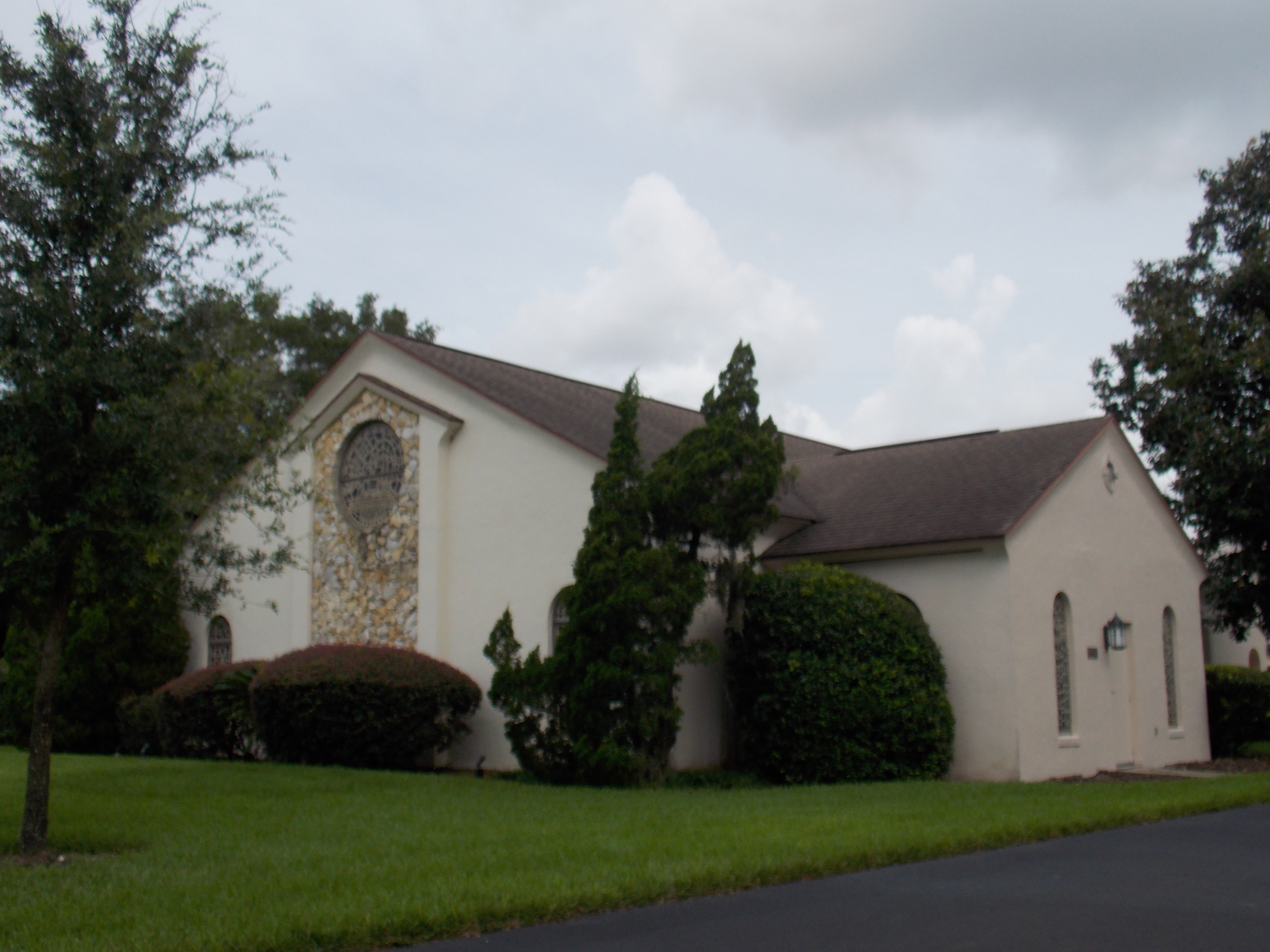
St. Alban's Cathedral in Oviedo, Florida

The Presiding Bishop of the APA from its founding until 2021 was Walter Howard Grundorf, who was consecrated on October 3, 1991, by the Rt. Rev. Robert William Stanley Mercer, CR, sometime Bishop of Matabeleland in the province of Central Africa, the Rt. Rev. Robert Herbert Mize, Junior, sometime Bishop of Damaraland in the province of Southern Africa, and the Rt. Rev. Charles Francis Boynton, sometime Bishop Suffragan of New York and Missionary Bishop of Puerto Rico. Grundorf was a signatory to the Bartonville Agreement of 1999 which outlined a plan for cooperation between some of the Continuing Anglican churches and conservatives in the Episcopal Church.

On June 10, 2010, the Rev. Canon Chandler Holder Jones SSC, was elected Bishop Suffragan of the Diocese of the Eastern United States at the 42nd annual synod of the diocese, held in Orlando, Florida. He was consecrated on September 18, 2010, at Saint Alban's Cathedral in Oviedo, Florida by the Most Rev. Walter Howard Grundorf, assisted by the Rt. Rev. Larry Lee Shaver, the Rt. Rev. C. Peter Brewer, the Rt. Rev. Paul C. Hewett (Diocese of the Holy Cross), the Rt. Rev. Clark Dorman, and the Rt. Rev. Arthur Rushlow.

On July 18, 2019, Bishop Chandler Jones was elected Bishop Coadjutor of the Diocese of the Eastern United States at the 51st annual synod, held in Orlando, Florida.

On July 19, 2012, the Rev. Robert Todd Giffin was elected Bishop Suffragan of the Diocese of Mid-America at the 3rd annual synod of the diocese, held in Lima, Ohio. He was consecrated on October 6, 2012, by the Most Rev. Walter Howard Grundorf, assisted by the Rt. Rev. Chandler Holder Jones, SSC, the Most Rev. Brian Richard Marsh (Anglican Church in America) and the Rt. Rev. Larry Lee Shaver. On February 22, 2014, the Rt. Rev. Robert Todd Giffin was elected Bishop Coadjutor of the Diocese of Mid-America at an election synod held in Merrillville, Indiana. On June 20, 2015, Bishop Giffin was installed and enthroned by the Most Rev Walter Howard Grundorf, Presiding Bishop of the Anglican Province of America, as the new Bishop Ordinary of the DMA at the diocese's 6th annual synod. The synod, installment and enthronement were held at the Pro-Cathedral of St. Andrew the Evangelist in Merrillville, Indiana. Bishop Giffin succeeded the Rt. Rev. Larry Lee Shaver as the second bishop of the diocese, which was formed in 2010. The Rt. Rev. Larry Lee Shaver was transferred to the Anglican Catholic Church (ACC), Diocese of the Midwest, by Letters Dimissory dated October 5, 2022.

On July 22, 2021, upon consent and ratification by the Provincial Synod, the Diocese of Mid-America and the Diocese of the West joined to form the Diocese of the Central and Western States. Bishop Robert Todd Giffin was elected the Bishop Ordinary of the new diocese, which held its Primary Synod on August 22, 2021. In 2025, Bishop Giffin left the APA with some of the parishes, with the intention of creating a new non-geographic diocese. Bishop Giffin then founded the Anglican Missionary Church and the International Communion of the Anglican Missionary Church.

Upon Bishop Grundorf's retirement at the 53rd annual Synod of the Diocese of the Eastern United States held in Dunwoody Georgia, on July 22, 2021, Bishop Chandler Holder Jones was enthroned as the fourth Bishop Ordinary of the Diocese of the Eastern United States at the newly designated Saint Barnabas Cathedral in Dunwoody, Georgia. The following day, July 23, 2021, Bishop Jones was elected by the Provincial Synod as the new Presiding Bishop of the Province, and was installed by the retired Presiding Bishop Grundorf at Saint Barnabas Cathedral. Presiding Bishop Jones now serves as the Primate of the Anglican Province of America, and Metropolitan of the APA affiliated Churches in India, Ecuador, the Philippines, and Haiti.

In 2015, Bishop Jones addressed Forward in Faith North America at the International Catholic Congress of Anglicans.

== Ecumenical agreements ==
Through the Federation of Anglican Churches in the Americas, the APA was associated with the Common Cause Partnership, an organization seeking to unite various Anglican jurisdictions to form a new conservative province of the Anglican Communion in North America. But when, in July 2008, the APA voted to delay a decision on its membership until a number of contentious issues were resolved in the Common Cause Partnership, including whether or not to accept the practice of ordaining women, the APA's Diocese of the West disaffiliated. It subsequently joined the Reformed Episcopal Church and, through her, the Common Cause Partnership. On March 4, 2009, the Anglican Province of America (APA) reorganized its Diocese of the West (DOW) with parishes that had chosen not to follow Richard Boyce out of the APA.

There have recently been discussions of unifying elements of the Anglican Church in America with the Anglican Province of America. The Traditional Anglican Communion, including its American branch, the ACA, has long sought unity with the Roman Catholic Church. In October 2009, the Vatican responded with Anglicanorum Coetibus, which allows for the establishment of Anglican personal ordinariates under papal authority. Some members of the ACA agreed to join the ordinariate, while others have not. Instead, the latter continued as the Anglican Church in America and pursued establishing closer relationships with other Continuing Anglican jurisdictions, particularly their former brethren, the APA. In July 2011, the APA's provincial synod voted unanimously to approve an intercommunion agreement with the ACA, anticipating a formal reunion of the two bodies at some time in the future.

In January 2016, the APA reached a formal accord with the ACA, the Anglican Catholic Church, and the Diocese of the Holy Cross.

On October 6, 2017, at a joint synod in Atlanta, Georgia (U.S.), the primates of the Anglican Province of America, the Anglican Church in America, the Anglican Catholic Church, and the Diocese of the Holy Cross signed a concordat of full communion. The Most Rev. Brian R. Marsh (ACA), the Most Rev. Mark D. Haverland (ACC), the Most Rev. Walter H. Grundorf (APA), and the Rt. Rev. Paul C. Hewett (DHC) signed the following document, called the Atlanta Concordat: "We acknowledge each other to be orthodox and catholic Anglicans in virtue of our common adherence to the authorities accepted by and summarized in the Affirmation of St. Louis in the faith of the Holy Tradition of the undivided Catholic Church and of the seven Ecumenical Councils. We recognize in each other in all essentials the same faith; the same sacraments; the same moral teaching; and the same worship; likewise, we recognize in each other the same Holy Orders of bishops, priests, and deacons in the same Apostolic Succession, insofar as we all share the episcopate conveyed to the Continuing Churches in Denver in January 1978 in response to the call of the Congress of Saint Louis; therefore, We welcome members of all of our Churches to Holy Communion and parochial life in any and all of the congregations of our Churches; and, We pledge to pursue full, institutional, and organic union with each other, in a manner that respects tender consciences, builds consensus and harmony, and fulfills increasingly our Lord’s will that His Church be united; and, We pledge also to seek unity with other Christians, including those who understand themselves to be Anglican, insofar as such unity is consistent with the essentials of Catholic faith, order, and moral teaching."

On February 16, 2022, it was announced that the APA has entered into an agreement of full sacramental communion (communio in sacris) with the Traditional Anglican Church. The Most Reverend Shane B. Janzen, Metropolitan of the Anglican Catholic Church of Canada, serves as Primate of the TAC.

== International communities ==
The Indigenous Pastorale of the Anglican Province of America in Ecuador comprises thirty-two communities totaling about 20,000 people. This Global Partnership was established and recognized by the government of Ecuador in July 2016. The communicants of the IPAPAE were formerly under the jurisdiction of the Roman Catholic Diocese of Riobamba.

== Liturgy ==
According to the Constitution of the Anglican Province of America (2022), the 1928 American Edition of the Book of Common Prayer is to be used. In addition "other traditional Anglican liturgies" as may be authorized by the bishop ordinary, are "permitted for general use" in the worship of the church. The following are permitted for general use in addition to, and subordination to, The Book of Common Prayer, 1928 American Edition: 1. The Book of Offices, Third Edition, 1970, or earlier editions thereof; 2. The Calendar and the Collects, Epistles, and Gospels contained in the Lesser Feasts and Fasts and Special Occasions (1963 Edition or earlier); 3. The Priest's Manual; 4. The Book of Occasional Offices (1960 Edition); 5. The Hymnal, 1940, and other hymns and music authorized by the incumbent; 6. The Anglican Missal; 7. The American Missal.
