= Anglican Province of Christ the King =

American Christian denomination

- Abbreviation: APCK
- Classification: Christian
- Orientation: Anglican
- Theology: Anglo-Catholic
- Polity: Episcopal
- Intercommunion: Anglican Catholic Church; United Episcopal Church of North America
- Region: United States
- Founder: Robert S. Morse
- Origin: 1977; St. Louis, Missouri, US
- Separated from: Episcopal Church in the United States of America
- Congregations: 34
- Members: 8,300 (World Christian Database, 2020)
- Official website: www.anglicanpck.org

The Anglican Province of Christ the King (APCK) is a Continuing Anglican church with traditional forms both of doctrine and liturgy. It is considered one of the more Anglo-Catholic jurisdictions among Continuing Anglican church bodies. In 2020, the World Christian Encyclopedia and World Christian Database reported that the APCK claimed 8,300 members.

== History ==
At the founding of the Continuing Anglican movement in 1977 at the Congress of St. Louis, a proposed constitution for a new Anglican church in North America was put before the four existing dioceses for ratification. The two which did ratify the constitution later adopted the name Anglican Catholic Church. The two which did not ratify because of concerns that the role of the new church's bishops was overly narrow, elected to continue under the original name of the movement. One of these non-ratifying dioceses, the Diocese of the Southeastern States, dissolved within a short time leaving only the Diocese of Christ the King under its bishop ordinary, Robert Morse of California. In 1981, the Diocese of Christ the King reported 40 parishes across the United States, with more than 35 clergy. A new name, Province of Christ the King, was adopted as the church expanded to become a nationwide jurisdiction spanning the United States. The province was renamed as the Anglican Province of Christ the King in 1991.

On July 25, 2007, the bishop and most of the parishes in the Eastern Diocese of the APCK withdrew, joining the Anglican Church in America. However, four of its parishes decided to remain within the APCK.

On June 29, 2007, James E. Provence was elected as successor to Morse upon the latter's retirement as archbishop of the province. Morse continued as provost of St. Joseph of Arimathea Anglican Theological Seminary which he was instrumental in founding in 1979. Provence was installed as Archbishop in 2008. He resigned on July 20, 2015 after allegations of misconduct. Frederick G. Morrison was elected to succeed him as archbishop. Morrison retired on January 1, 2020, and was replaced by Archbishop John E Upham. Upham had been consecrated a Suffragan Bishop of the Diocese of the Atlantic States on August 15, 2012. Archbishop Upham deceased in February, 2023.

On June 14, 2023, Blair W. Schultz was elected as the fifth archbishop of the Anglican Province of Christ the King. Archbishop Schultz was consecrated bishop suffragan of the Diocese of the Atlantic States in Tulsa, Oklahoma, on September 21, 2017, by the Most Reverend Frederick G. Morrison, the Right Reverend Donald M. Ashman, the Right Reverend John E. Upham, and the Right Reverend Frank W. Brulc.

From 2003 to 2011, the Anglican Catholic Church (ACC), the Anglican Province of Christ the King (APCK), and the United Episcopal Church of North America (UECNA) explored opportunities for greater cooperation and the possibility of achieving organic unity. In 2003, Archbishop John-Charles Vockler of the ACC in a letter, called for prayers for healing of the damaged relations between the ACC and the APCK. In 2007 intercommunion was formally established between the APCK and the ACC and UECNA. In January 2009, one bishop from each jurisdiction consecrated three suffragan bishops in St. Louis, intending that they serve all three jurisdictions.

Archbishop Robert Morse died in 2015.

== Publications ==
The publishing arm of the APCK is known as the American Church Union (ACU). The APCK publishes a newsletter called The Shepherd's Staff.

== Parishes ==
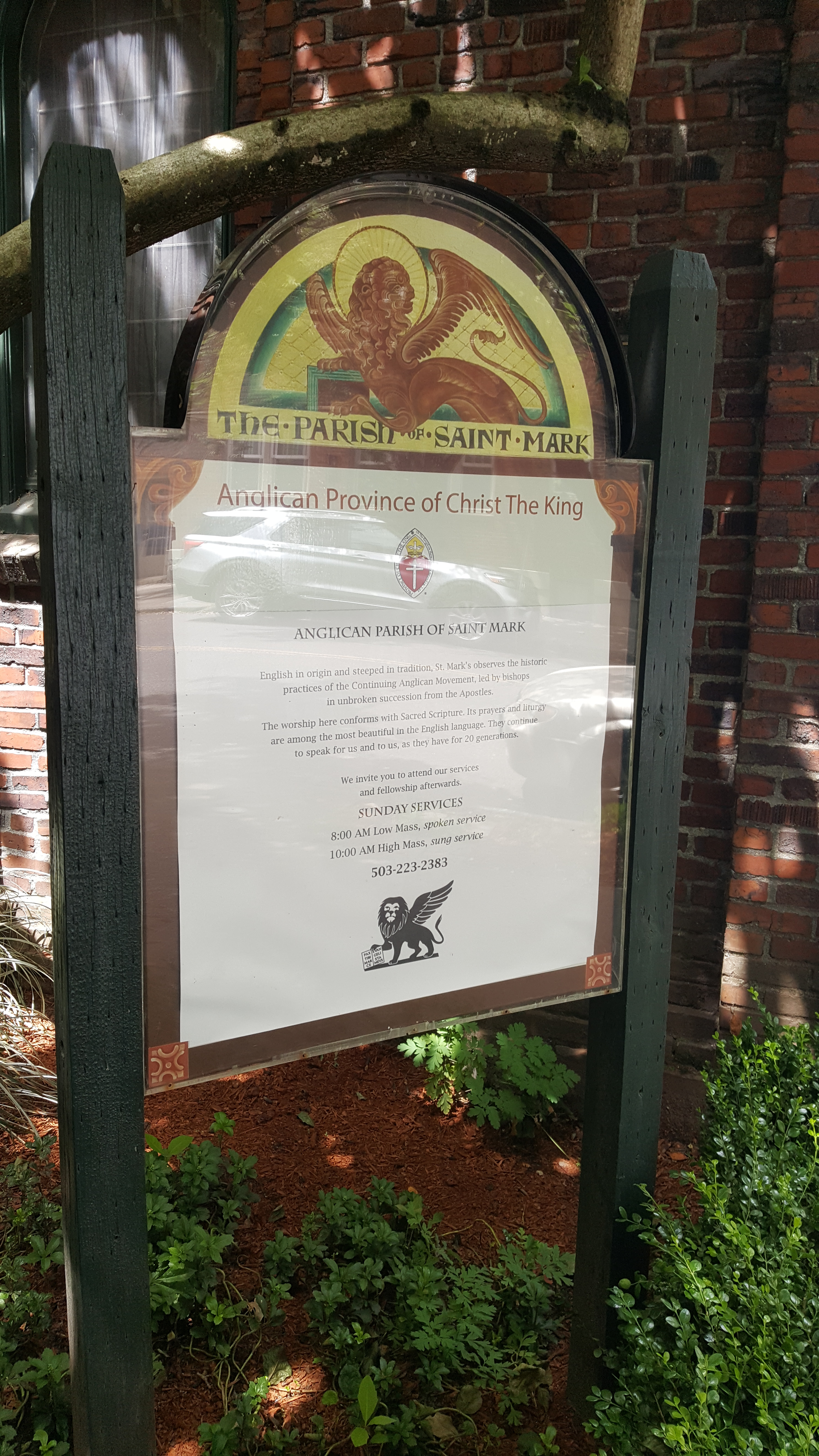
The Parish of Saint Mark, Portland, Oregon.

The APCK has around 34 parishes across three dioceses organized geographically. Twelve of its parishes are in California.

== Seminary ==
Saint Joseph of Arimathea Anglican Theological College was founded in 1979 as a seminary for the newly formed Diocese of Christ the King. It continues to offer classes, in person and online, mostly for prospective clergy of the APCK. It is located one block south of the University of California, Berkeley.

The college had originally been founded in 1952 by Robert S. Morse as the Episcopal Chaplaincy at Stanford University, with the St. Joseph of Arimathea Foundation established in 1960. In 1964 the current location was purchased. Due to disagreements between Robert S. Morse and the then Episcopal bishop, James Pike, in 1963 Morse resigned as chairman but filled the board with Orthodox and Catholic clergy, including Prince Vasili Romanov and the Very Rev. Alexander Schmemann. The St. Joseph’s Student Center hosted Orthodox, Catholic, and Anglican services throughout the week.
