= Congress of St. Louis =

1977 gathering of Anglicans in Missouri

The September 14–16, 1977 Congress of St. Louis was an international gathering of nearly 2,000 Anglicans in St. Louis, Missouri, united in their rejection of theological changes introduced by the Anglican Church of Canada and by the Episcopal Church in the United States of America (then known as Protestant Episcopal Church USA) in its General Convention of 1976. Anglicans who attended this congress felt that these changes amounted to foundational alterations in the American and Canadian provinces of the Anglican Communion and meant that they had "departed from Christ's One, Holy, Catholic and Apostolic Church." Theological liberalism, financial support for political action groups, participation in the Consultation on Church Union (COCU), revisions to the Book of Common Prayer, and the ordination of women priests were not the only reasons for the split, but they were seen by these churches as evidence of the mainline church's departure from Anglican orthodoxy. The idea for a congress originated with the Reverend Canon Albert J. duBois in 1973 in preparation for the Louisville General Convention of the Episcopal Church. Canon duBois and the group called "Anglicans United" toured parishes in advance of the Congress to garner support. In 1976, the Fellowship of Concerned Churchmen, an organization founded in 1973 as a coordinating agent for laypeople and clergy concerned about the breakdown of faith and order within the Episcopal Church and the Anglican Church of Canada, met to organize a Church Congress in St. Louis the following year.

== The Congress ==
Prior to the Congress, the Presiding Bishop of the Episcopal Church, John Allin, met with five priests active in the movement in which he expressed the hope that "no one will decide to leave" the church.

On September 14, 1977, Holy Cross Day, after Evening Prayer, Perry Laukhuff, President of the Fellowship of Concerned Churchmen, called the Congress to session. There were then three keynote addresses, by George W. Rutler, Carroll E. Simcox, and Thomas G. Barnes. Rutler spoke to the question of remaining in communion with the See of Canterbury, expressing the hope that the Archbishop of Canterbury would join with their cause but noting "Communion with Canterbury is like communion with anybody else in Christ, a good and joyful, beautiful and blessed thing to have... but it is not of the essence and quidity of Anglicanism."

On September 15, the day opened with Morning Prayer and Sung Eucharist, with Albert Chambers presiding, accompanied by Charles F. Boynton and Clarence R. Haden. Participation in the liturgy was limited to members of the Episcopal or Canadian Anglican churches who were sympathetic to the movement, excluding observers from the Anglican Orthodox Church and the American Episcopal Church. Reception of Holy Communion was allowed to all present, including the Presiding Bishop of the Episcopal Church, John Allin, who was present but did not address the congress. In the afternoon, more speeches were given, including those of Carmino de Catanzaro, George H. Clendenin, and Dorothy Faber. Later in the day, representatives from the Diocese of the Holy Trinity, which was under Albert Chambers as Episcopal Visitor, elected James O. Mote as the first bishop of the new movement.

On the final day, September 16, the Affirmation of St. Louis was presented, as well as the proposed name of the new church, Anglican Church in North America (Episcopal). The closing discussion concerned finding three bishops to consecrate Fr. Mote, as well as drawing up a Constitution.

In addition to Presiding Bishop Allin, nine other bishops of the Episcopal Church were present, as well as bishops of the Independent Episcopal Church, the Episcopal Church of North America (Evangelical), and the Anglican Orthodox Church.

== Reactions ==
The Executive Council of the Episcopal Church immediately responded on September 18, 1977, with a resolution that called for the Episcopal Church "to continue to talk with our estranged colleagues and not to close any doors to those who choose to separate themselves, with the hope that we will be reunited in God's church."

As a result of the Anglican – Roman Catholic dialogue, Cardinal Seper was aware of the impending split early in 1977, and presented a proposal for consideration of what later became the Pastoral Provision to the Rt. Rev. Albert Chambers and Bishop-elect James O. Mote. Only the Pro-Diocese of St. Augustine of Canterbury, which contained parishes that left the Diocese of the Holy Trinity to seek union with Rome, made use of the Pastoral Provision. Bishop Bernard Law was appointed to oversee the process, and Father James Parker was named as his assistant.

The press coverage of the Congress was quite extensive in national and church media, including the television networks, and resulted in the PECUSA schism being voted by the Religion Newswriters Association as the top religion story of 1977. The New York Times ran a special report on September 17, 1977.

== The Affirmation of St. Louis ==
The Affirmation of St. Louis was first germinated at the Nashville meeting of the Fellowship of Concerned Churchmen on November 4 and 5, 1976. Bishop Clarence Haden, of the Episcopal Diocese of Northern California, who was present as a visitor, suggested that the Fellowship of Concerned Churchmen must profess a specific and unswerving basis for its stand if it were to lead a movement to set up a Continuing Episcopal Church. Dr. Harold Weatherby, of the Society for the Preservation of the Book of Common Prayer, concurred that the principles on which a Continuing Church would be based needed to be formed. In the public statement released by the Fellowship of Concerned Churchmen following this meeting, it was announced that the drafting of a statement of moral and devotional principles upon which a Continuing Church would be based had been commissioned. The drafting committee met several times during the spring and summer of 1977. At the final pre-Congress meeting of the Fellowship of Concerned Churchmen, less than twenty-four hours before the Congress opened, a complete draft of the Affirmation of St. Louis was presented. After several hours of deliberation, the draft was approved unanimously with some amendments. It was read out to the 1,800 attendees at the Congress and received a standing ovation without debate or discussion.

The Congress of St. Louis produced the Affirmation of St. Louis which authorized the formation of the "Anglican Church in North America (Episcopal)". The first chapter, Principles of Doctrine, was written for the most part by the Rev. Dr. Carmino de Catanzaro, future first bishop of the Anglican Catholic Church of Canada. Although it was not put to a vote at the Congress, most Continuing Anglican churches nevertheless consider it to be an official statement of their faith.

The Affirmation consists of an Introduction and five sections. The main points of the Introduction are:

- Dissolution of Anglican Church structures: That the churches to which the delegates had previously belonged had ceased to have a valid ministry through the act of ordaining women to the priesthood.
- Continuation of Anglicanism: That Anglicanism could only continue through a complete separation from the structures of the Episcopal Church in the USA and the Anglican Church of Canada.
- Invalidity of Schismatic Authority: That the churches to which the delegates had previously belonged had made themselves schismatic by their break with traditional order and, therefore, had ceased to have any authority over them or other members.
- Continued Communion with Canterbury: That communion with Canterbury and all faithful parts of the Anglican Communion would continue. On October 17, 2014, the College of Bishops of the Anglican Catholic Church formally derogated this statement, ruling that there were "obliged no longer to count the Sees of Canterbury and York or any other Sees taking, implementing or subscribing to [the ordination of women as priests or bishops] as being faithful parts of the Anglican Communion."

Chapter 1, Principles of Doctrine, contains dogmatic theology and affirms the three confessions of faith of the Nicene Creed, the Apostoles' Creed, and the Creed of St. Athanasius. Likewise, the Seven Ecumenical Councils are affirmed, as well as Seven Sacraments, with Baptism and Holy Eucharist highlighted as being incorporation into Christ and "the sacrifice which unites us to the all-sufficient Sacrifice of Christ on the Cross and the Sacrament in which He feeds us with His Body and Blood", respectively. The ecumenical goal of seeking full sacramental communion and visible unity with other Christians who hold the Catholic and Apostolic Faith is declared.

Chapter 2, Principles of Morality, covers original sin, sanctity of human life, and marriage as a sacrament between one man and one woman.

Chapter 3, Constitutional Principles, discusses organizational principles for the selection of bishops, structure of synods, and establishment of ecclesiastical courts. It also called for a Constitutional Assembly to draft a Constitution and Canons which would be based on the Affirmation, ancient Custom and the General Canon Law, and the former law of the American and Canadian provinces. This Constitutional Assembly met in 1978 as the Synod of Dallas.

Chapter 4, Principles of Worship, permits the Book of Common Prayer only in the editions of The Canadian Book of 1962 and the American Book of 1928. Service books conforming to and incorporating them are also allowed.

Chapter 5, Principles of Action, concerns temporal affairs of finances, pensions, and education. Membership in the World Council of Churches or Consultation of Church Union is explicitly rejected. Communion with the See of Canterbury and the Anglican Communion is again repeated. This section was also repealed by the College of Bishops of the Anglican Catholic Church on October 17, 2014, interpreting it instead as "full communio in sacris should actively be sought with those Apostolic and Catholic Churches that subscribe fully to the Affirmation of St. Louis and uphold its principles in practice."

== See also ==
- Continuing Anglican Movement
- American Church Union
- Anglican Use
- Anglican Catholic Church
- Anglican Catholic Church of Canada
- Anglican Province of Christ the King
- United Episcopal Church of North America

== Bibliography ==
- Doenecke, J. D. (1986). Schism in Perspective: A Comparative View. Historical Magazine of the Protestant Episcopal Church, 55(4), 321–325. http://www.jstor.org/stable/42974144
- Andrews, Robert M. (2022). Continuing Anglicanism? The History, Theology, and Contexts of “The Affirmation of St Louis” (1977). Journal of Religious History, 46(1), 40–60. https://doi.org/10.1111/1467-9809.12821
- Warner, C. V. (2010). Recognizing Anglican Catholic identity: an historical review of the Anglican Catholic Movement, the affirmation of St. Louis and the traditional Anglican Communion. https://scholar.acadiau.ca/islandora/object/theses:3832
- Sullins, D. P. (2017). The History of the 1980 Anglican Pastoral Provision. The Catholic Historical Review, 103(3), 529–558. http://www.jstor.org/stable/45178727
- Tighe, W. J. (2022). The St. Louis Congress: Forty-Five Years Later. New Oxford Review, 89(10), 16–24. https://wikipedialibrary.idm.oclc.org/login?auth=production&url=https://search.ebscohost.com/login.aspx?direct=true&db=a9h&AN=160851339&site=eds-live&scope=site
