= United Episcopal Church of North America =

Part of the Continuing Anglican movement

- UECNA crest
- Classification: Protestant
- Orientation: Anglican
- Polity: Episcopal
- Archbishop: Peter D. Robinson
- Associations: Intercommunion with the Anglican Province of Christ the King
- Region: United States
- Founder: Charles Doren
- Origin: 1981; 45 years ago Pittsburgh, Pennsylvania, US
- Separated from: Anglican Catholic Church
- Congregations: 20 parishes, missions, and affiliated congregations
- Official website: unitedepiscopal.org

The United Episcopal Church of North America (UECNA) is a church in the Anglican tradition and is part of the Continuing Anglican movement. It is not part of the Anglican Communion.

The UECNA describes itself as "embracing the broad base of ceremonial practice inherent in the Historic Anglican Communion" although historically the UECNA has tended to be low or broad church in its ceremonial practice. The UECNA uses the 1928 American Book of Common Prayer and 1662 English prayer book in the US and, in Canada, the 1962 Canadian prayer book and 1662 prayer book.

The changes in the Episcopal Church and the Anglican Church of Canada that the UECNA and other continuing churches objected to include the theology of the newer liturgies such as the Episcopal Church's 1979 prayer book, the ordination of women, attitudes toward divorce and abortion, and differing interpretations of how the authority of scripture is perceived.

== History ==
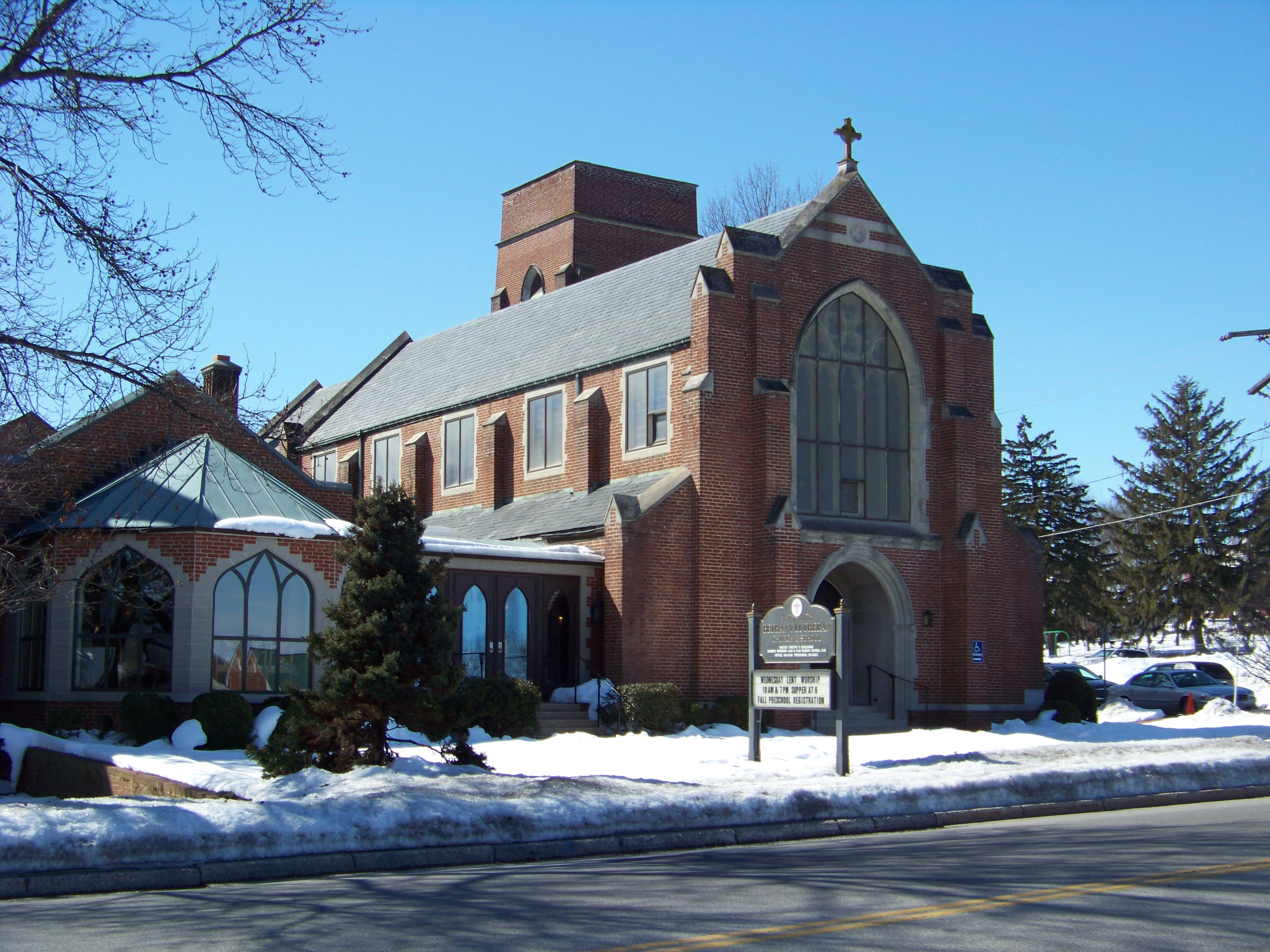
Good Shepherd Anglican Church in Waynesboro, Virginia

The origins of the United Episcopal Church of North America lie with the Congress of St. Louis in September 1977, and with Charles D. D. Doren, the first bishop consecrated for the new "Anglican Church in North America (Episcopal)," later named the Anglican Catholic Church. Doren had been elected bishop of the Diocese of the Midwest immediately following the St. Louis meeting, and was consecrated on 28 January 1978 by Albert A. Chambers, acting bishop of the ACNA(E), and Francisco Pagtakhan. Letters of consent were received from bishops Mark Pae of Taejon, Korea, and Charles Boynton, formerly Assistant Bishop of New York. He was translated to the Diocese of the Mid-Atlantic States in 1979, but he soon backed away from active participation in the Anglican Catholic Church.

Parallel to Doren's departure from active episcopal ministry in the ACC, three parishes sympathetic to Doren's concerns left the Anglican Catholic Church, and set about the task of forming a new body. This led to the creation of the United Episcopal Church of North America at a meeting held in Pittsburgh, Pennsylvania, in October 1981. The standing committee of the new jurisdiction invited Doren to be its first bishop and, subsequently, the first archbishop.

Since then, the church has described itself as representing the Broad, Central and low church traditions, but it also has one or two parishes from the Anglo-Catholic tradition. The church's constitution and canons are modeled on the PECUSA's 1958 code with some amendments, including provisions for the establishment of dioceses in Canada, and more specific direction is given as to the circumstances in which the jurisdiction will consecrate bishops for overseas. The last major revision of the UECNA canons was made in 2023, and the Constitution was revised in 2020.

Under the leadership of archbishops Doren (1981–1987) and Knight (1987–1992), the UECNA grew to almost forty congregations.

From 2007 to 2011, the ACC and the UECNA explored opportunities for greater cooperation and the possibility of achieving organic unity. Bishop Presley Hutchens of the ACC addressed delegates to the UECNA convention of 2008 and discussed the possibility of uniting the ACC and UECNA. Although well received at the time, there was a feeling among many of the delegates that the proposal was being rushed, and that no proper consideration was being given to the theological, constitutional and canonical issues thrown up by the move. Moves towards unity with the Anglican Catholic Church were referred for further discussion and subsequently stalled.

At the 2008 General Convention, the delegates elected three suffragan bishops with the intention that they would serve the UECNA and also assist the ACC and APCK when requested. Two of them subsequently departed the UECNA for the Reformed Episcopal Church, leaving Peter D. Robinson as the sole suffragan bishop in UECNA until his appointment as Bishop of the Missionary District of the West in November, 2009. Robinson was named as Archbishop Coadjutor by the National Council in April 2010 to succeed Stephen C. Reber upon his retirement on September 6, 2010. He was elected as Presiding Bishop by the 10th General Convention, held in Heber Springs, AR, on May 12, 2011. Under Robinson's leadership, the UECNA has positioned itself emphasizing its continuity with the old Protestant Episcopal Church and the English Reformation.

The UECNA had an intercommunion agreement with the Diocese of the Great Lakes prior the Diocese's full incorporation on July 19, 2014. Bishop David Hustwick led this previously independent diocese into the UECNA, becoming its diocese for the Great Lakes states and eastern Canada. In January, 2015, a petition was received from Bishop George Conner of the Anglican Episcopal Church at the behest of that jurisdiction's standing committee asking for admission as a non-geographical diocese of the UECNA. This was granted on February 11, 2015.

Between 2018 and 2024, the UECNA Eastern Missionary Diocese worked with a group of former Evangelical and Reformed Church congregations that had embraced Episcopal polity with a view to incorporating them into the United Episcopal Church. This was ultimately unsuccessful due to a lack of support by the House of Bishops. In September 2024, Bishop Robinson, assisted by Bishop Robert Biermann, consecrated the Rev. Aaron Long as Bishop and President of the Evangelical and Reformed Synod, resulting in a disavowal from within the UECNA House of Bishops. In the aftermath of this disagreement, the United Episcopal Church has refocused on its Classical Anglican identity, exacerbating tension with the Anglican Catholic Church which, as of August 1, 2025, ended intercommunion with the UECNA due to differences surrounding the interpretation of the Anglican Formularies and the Affirmation of St Louis.

== Doctrine ==
The doctrinal position of the United Episcopal Church is defined by the preface to the Constitution of the UECNA and the Declaration of Conformity contained in Article VIII of the UECNA Constitution.

The UECNA considers the Affirmation of St. Louis to be one of its founding documents, but has never incorporated into its Constitution and Canons. Instead, it prefers the older standards of the Thirty-nine Articles of Religion, The Book of Homilies, and the Book of Common Prayer as the basis of its doctrine. This position was reaffirmed by a Resolution of the 2020 General Convention of the UECNA which was carried unanimously.

== Publications ==
- Glad Tidings – the Quarterly Magazine and Journal of the UECNA

== See also ==
- Good Shepherd Anglican Church (Waynesboro, Virginia)
- St. Paul's Church and Rectory
