= Anglican Church in America =

Continuing Anglican church body

- Coat of arms of the Anglican Church in America
- Classification: Christian
- Orientation: Anglican
- Theology: Anglo-Catholicism
- Polity: Episcopal
- Leader: Juan Garcia
- Full communion: Anglican Province of America and Anglican Catholic Church
- Region: United States
- Headquarters: Belchertown, MA
- Founder: Louis Falk
- Origin: 1991
- Merger of: American Episcopal Church (AEC) and approximately 1/3 of the parishes of the Anglican Catholic Church (ACC)
- Separations: Anglican Province of America American Anglican Church
- Merged into: Anglican Catholic Church
- Congregations: c. 65
- Members: 5,200
- Official website: www.anglicanchurchinamerica.org

The Anglican Church in America (ACA) was a Continuing Anglican church body and the United States branch of the Traditional Anglican Church (TAC). The ACA, which is separate from the Episcopal Church (TEC), is not a member of the Anglican Communion. It comprised five dioceses and around 5,200 members. In 2025, the church's House of Bishops unanimously voted to reunite with the Anglican Catholic Church and disaffiliate with Traditional Anglican Church. On October 15 of the same year, the Anglican Catholic Church received the Anglican Church in America and the ACA ceased to exist.

== History ==
ACA Cathedral of St. John, Quincy, Illinois

The Anglican Church in America was created in 1991 following extensive negotiations between the Anglican Catholic Church (ACC) and the American Episcopal Church (AEC). The effort was aimed at overcoming disunity in the Continuing Anglican movement. This was only partially successful. Most ACC parishes declined to enter the new ACA, resulting in a continuing existence for the ACC, while the remainder of its parishes and some of its bishops joined the AEC in forming the new church. In 1995, some parishes which had formerly been part of the AEC, primarily in eastern states and the Pacific Northwest, withdrew from the ACA and formed the Anglican Province of America under the leadership of Bishop Walter Grundorf.

In 2006, Bishop George Langberg, bishop of the Diocese of the Northeast, publicly opposed actions taken at the Convention of the Episcopal Church and held a requiem "in observance of the death of the Episcopal Church."

The Traditional Anglican Communion had been seeking unity with the Roman Catholic Church while still retaining aspects of its Anglican heritage. In 2007, in Portsmouth, England, all TAC bishops present accepted the ministry of the Bishop of Rome and the Catechism of the Catholic Church and requested a means of establishing full communion. The petition was signed on the altar. The Vatican has a record of making some accommodations for Anglicans. In 1980, the Pastoral Provision was issued which allowed the creation of the Anglican Use and the establishment of Anglican Use parishes within dioceses of the United States. These parishes were initially composed of former members of the Episcopal Church.

The Vatican answered the requests of various Anglican groups for full communion by issuing the apostolic constitution Anglicanorum Coetibus, thus opening the possibility of corporate reunion with Rome for some Anglicans. On March 3, 2010, in Orlando, Florida, the eight members of the House of Bishops of the ACA voted unanimously to accept the Pope's proposal by formally petitioning the Vatican for a personal ordinariate in the United States. The ACA petition to establish an ordinariate in the United States urged it be established "as soon as possible" and indicated that they were establishing an interim governing council.

In September 2010, however, the bishop of the ACA Diocese of the West, Daren K. Williams, announced that the bishops were divided on the matter and that parishes had left the church since the earlier news broke that union with the Roman Catholic Church was anticipated by the bishops. He also stated that talks between the ACA and the Anglican Province of America concerning a possible intercommunion agreement between the two were planned. That agreement was finalized in September, 2011. As of 2016, a reconciliation committee with bishops and priests from the ACA and the APA, under the leadership of Bishop George Langberg, is working on ways to unite the two churches.

On February 5, 2011, the chancellor of the Anglican Church in America issued a statement on behalf of the bishops of the ACA announcing that the church would remain a Continuing Anglican Church. The statement also reported that one diocesan bishop who favored acceptance of the Pope's proposal had submitted his resignation and that approximately fifteen parishes were expected to leave the ACA with him.

Brian R. Marsh was president of the ACA House of Bishops from 2011 to 2020. Since 2020, the Presiding Bishop has been Juan Garcia.

The ACA voted to merge with the ACC on June 6th, 2025. This was accomplished on October 15th at a Joint Synod held in North Charleston, SC.

== Organization ==
At the time it merged into the ACC, the ACA consisted of five dioceses:

- Diocese of the Northeast (DNE), Bishop Ordinary, The Rt. Rev.. Alexander H. Webb, Amherst, NH This diocese merged into the ACC's Diocese of the Resurrection, and Bishop Webb became the Ordinary.
- Diocese of the Eastern United States (DEUS), Bishop Ordinary, The Rt. Rev. William Bower, SSC, Timonium, Maryland This diocese was received as a non-geographic diocese of the ACC.
- Diocese of the Missouri Valley (DMV), Bishop Ordinary, The Rt. Rev. Patrick S. Fodor, Quincy, IL This diocese was received as a diocese of the ACC.
- Diocese of the West (DOW), Bishop Ordinary, The Rt. Rev. Robert Murray Hammond, Fillmore, CA This diocese was received as a non-geographic diocese of the ACC.
- Diocese of Puerto Rico and the Caribbean (DPRC), Bishop Ordinary, The Most Rev. Juan Garcia, Ponce, PR This diocese merged into the ACC's Diocese of the Caribbean, and Bishop Garcia became the Ordinary.
