= National Register of Historic Places listings in Waynesboro, Virginia =

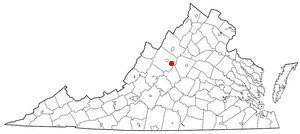
Location of Waynesboro in Virginia

This is a list of the National Register of Historic Places listings in Waynesboro, Virginia.

This is intended to be a complete list of the properties and districts on the National Register of Historic Places in the independent city of Waynesboro, Virginia, United States. The locations of National Register properties and districts for which the latitude and longitude coordinates are included below, may be seen in a Google map.

There are 11 properties and districts listed on the National Register in the city.

This National Park Service list is complete through NPS recent listings posted June 20, 2025.

== Current listings ==
	Name on the Register	Image	Date listed	Location	Description
1	Coiner-Quesenbery House	Coiner-Quesenbery House	November 7, 1976 (#76002232)	332 W. Main St. 38°04′06″N 78°53′18″W	
2	Crompton-Shenandoah Plant	Crompton-Shenandoah Plant	August 18, 2011 (#11000555)	200 W. 12th St. 38°03′48″N 78°53′18″W	
3	Fairfax Hall	Fairfax Hall	September 9, 1982 (#82004609)	Winchester Ave. 38°04′13″N 78°52′14″W	
4	Fishburne Military School	Fishburne Military School	October 4, 1984 (#84000058)	225 S. Wayne Ave. 38°04′03″N 78°53′31″W	Founded in 1879, one of oldest military academies in nation
5	General Electric Specialty Control Plant	General Electric Specialty Control Plant	March 29, 2012 (#12000180)	1 Solutions Way; 38°05′27″N 78°52′15″W	
6	Plumb House	Plumb House	January 24, 1991 (#90002178)	1012 W. Main St. 38°04′11″N 78°53′44″W	House museum covering Plumb family history and also Battle of Waynesboro, Virginia nearby
7	Port Republic Road Historic District	Port Republic Road Historic District	April 12, 2002 (#02000368)	Alpha, Beta, and Elkton Sts., Fairview Ave., Fontaine St., Minden Pl., Port Republic Rd., Riverside Dr., and Shiloh Ave. 38°04′26″N 78°53′10″W	
8	Rose Cliff	Rose Cliff	August 30, 2006 (#06000755)	835 Oak Ave. 38°03′45″N 78°54′09″W	
9	Tree Streets Historic District	Tree Streets Historic District	April 12, 2002 (#02000369)	Roughly bounded by Pine Ave., 11th St., S. Wayne Ave., 16th St., and Oak Ave. 38°03′52″N 78°53′49″W	Oldest residential area in Waynesboro; includes Pine, Locust, Cherry, Oak and other Avenues
10	Virginia Metalcrafters Historic District	Virginia Metalcrafters Historic District	November 16, 2015 (#15000810)	1010 E. Main St. 38°03′51″N 78°52′26″W	
11	Waynesboro Downtown Historic District	Waynesboro Downtown Historic District	January 24, 2002 (#01001511)	Federal St., Main St., Wayne Ave. 38°04′08″N 78°53′25″W	

== See also ==
- List of National Historic Landmarks in Virginia
- National Register of Historic Places listings in Virginia
- National Register of Historic Places listings in Augusta County, Virginia
