= Crompton (surname) =

Crompton is an English surname, originating from the town of Crompton in Lancashire, England, which in turn comes from Old English crumbe "river bend" and tun "enclosure, settlement, town".

The name has the variations Crumpton (mainly in the West Midlands) and Crampton.

== List of people named Crompton ==
- Alan Crompton (born 1958), English footballer
- Andy Crompton, English footballer
- Arthur Crompton (1903–1987), English footballer
- Ben Crompton (born 1974), English actor
- Bob Crompton (1879–1941), English footballer
- Charles Arthur Crompton (1848–1875), English rugby union player
- Charles Crompton (1833–1890), English barrister and liberal politician
- Sir Charles John Crompton (1797–1865), justice of the Court of Queen's Bench
- Colin Crompton (1931–1985), English stand-up comedian
- Darren Crompton (born 1972), English rugby union player
- Dennis Crompton (1935–2025), English architect
- Dennis Crompton (footballer) (1942–2015), English footballer
- Drew Crompton, American lawyer of Pennsylvania
- Dwayne Crompton (1946–2022), American educator
- Ellis Crompton (1886–1953), English footballer
- Geoff Crompton (1955–2002), American professional basketball player
- George Crompton (1829–1886), American inventor, manufacturer, and businessman, son of William Crompton (inventor)
- Gigi Crompton (1922–2020), American-British art conservator, botanist and author
- Herb Crompton (1911–1963), American Major League Baseball player
- Jack Crompton (1921–2013), English footballer
- John Battersby Crompton Lamburn (1893–1972). British author writing popular science as John Crompton
- John Crompton (MP), English politician who sat in the House of Commons from 1614 to 1622
- Jonathan Crompton (born 1987), American football quarterback
- Kevin Crompton known as CEvin Key (born 1961), Canadian musician
- Len Crompton (1902–?), English footballer
- Louis Crompton (1925–2009), Canadian scholar
- Martin Crompton, English rugby player
- Matthew Crompton (born 1971), British actor
- Ned Crompton (1889–1950), American Major League Baseball player
- Neil Crompton (born 1960), Australian racing driver
- Neil Crompton (footballer) (1937–2003), Australian rules footballer
- R. E. B. Crompton (1845–1940), British electrical engineer
- Reginald Crompton (1870–1945), British stage and silent film actor and screenwriter
- Richard Crompton, British journalist
- Richmal Crompton (1890–1969), English novelist and short story writer
- Rosemary Crompton (1942–2011), British sociologist and academic
- Samuel Crompton (1753–1827), English inventor
- Sarah Crompton (1802–1881), English children's writer
- Sir Samuel Crompton, 1st Baronet (1786–1827), British politician
- Thomas Crompton (died 1601), English MP for Steyning, Radnor, Leominster and Beverley
- Thomas Crompton (died 1608), English politician who sat in the House of Commons at various times between 1597 and 1609
- Thomas Crompton (Parliamentarian), English politician who sat in the House of Commons at various times between 1647 and 1660
- Wilf Crompton (1908–1971), English footballer
- William Crompton (inventor) (1806–1891), loom technology inventor
- William Crompton (politician) (1811–1886), New Zealand politician
- Wynne Crompton (1907–1988), Welsh footballer
