= George Crompton =

American inventor and businessman (1829–1886)

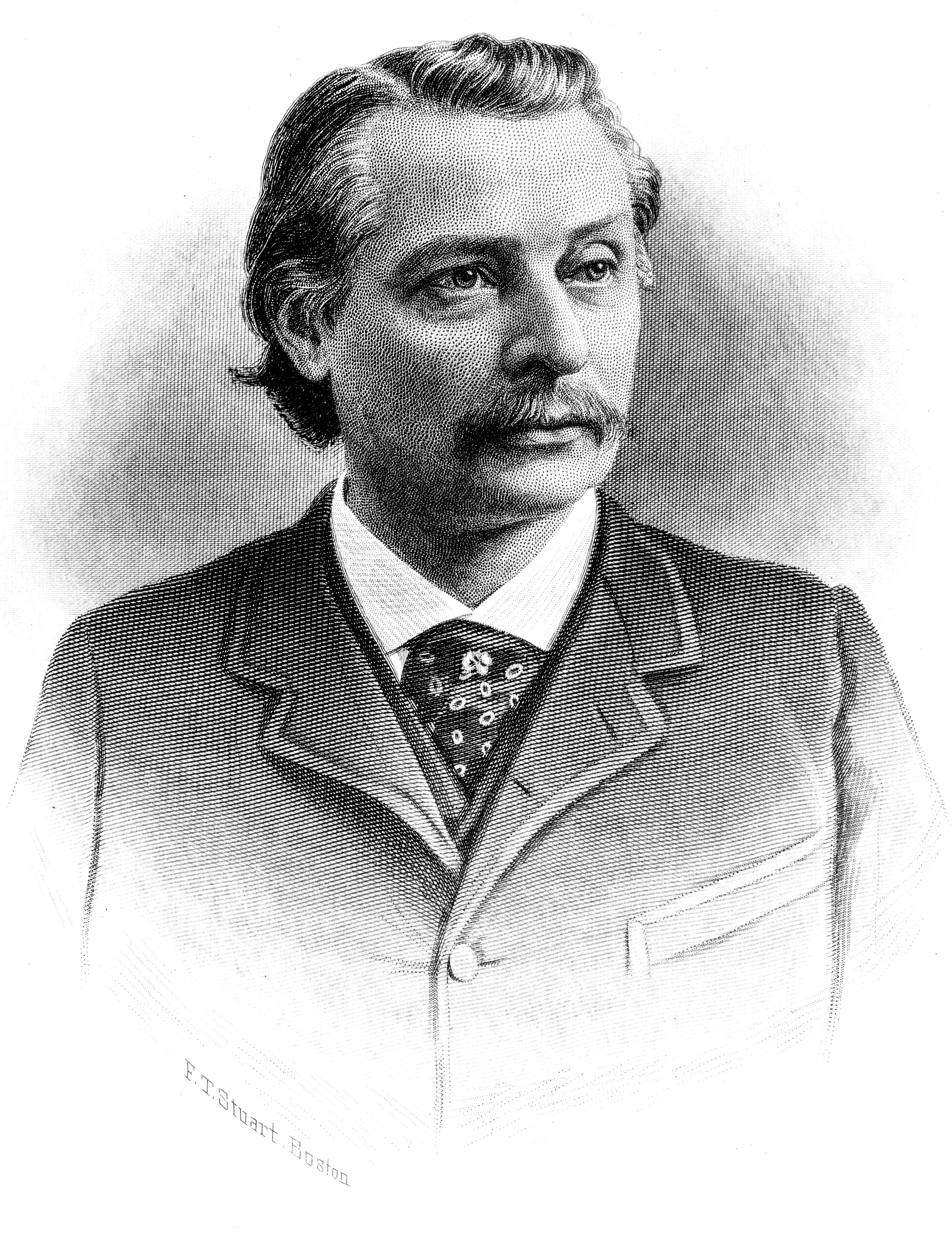
- Born: 23 March 1829; Lancashire, England
- Died: 16 December 1886 (aged 57); Worcester, Massachusetts
- Known for: Invention of the Crompton Loom
- Awards: Paris Exposition (1867); U.S. Centennial Exposition (1876); National Inventors Hall of Fame (2007)
- Scientific career
- Fields: Textiles, Invention, Manufacturing

Signature
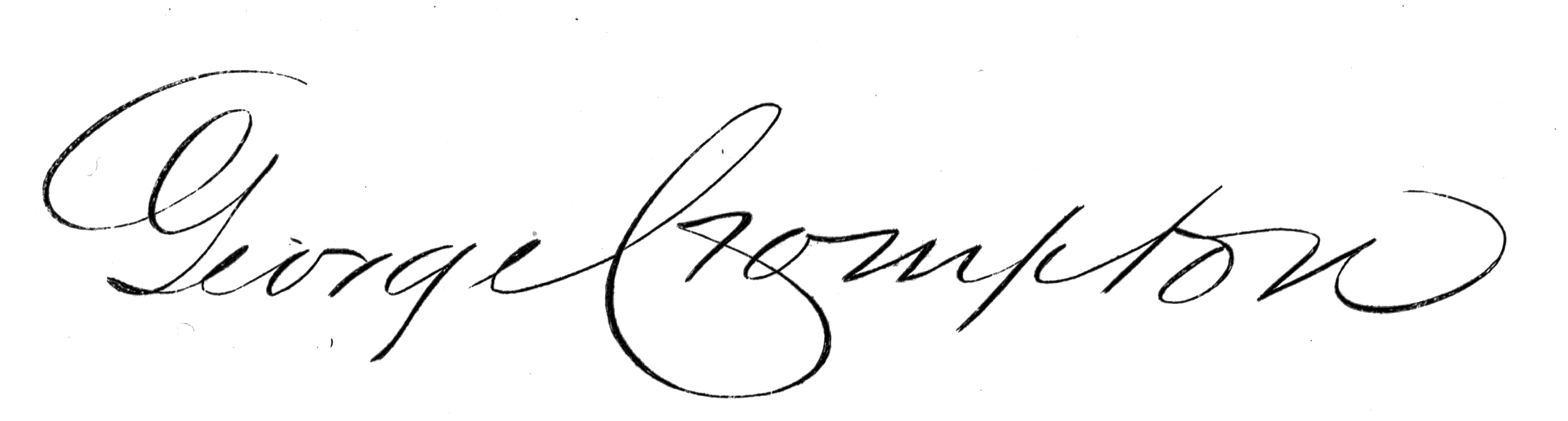

George Crompton (23 March 1829 – 29 December 1886) was an American inventor, manufacturer, and businessman and the son of William Crompton, an inventor. He is best known for his invention, perfection, and popularization of the Crompton Loom, a fancy loom that could reach maximum speeds of eighty-five picks per second, nearly twice the speed of its most efficient predecessors. Crompton Loom Works, located in his hometown of Worcester, Massachusetts, aided in the Civil War effort to provide uniforms and blankets for the U.S. Army. Crompton's looms did have competition from foreign innovations, yet when brought to the Paris Exposition Universelle (1867) his products won a silver medal. His looms were also present at the Philadelphia Centennial Exposition of 1876. From these two events, the Crompton Loom gained popularity and became famous throughout the manufacturing circles. Crompton was also quite involved in his town of Worcester; he was a member of the common council (1860–1861) and held the office of alderman (1863–1864), in addition to running for mayor unsuccessfully in 1871. When he died, Worcester announced that it had lost the man who helped the town transform from a "pretty New England town" to an industrial city. Crompton was inducted into the National Inventors Hall of Fame in 2007 due to the large-scale impact of his loom.

== Early life ==
George Crompton was born at Holcombe, Tottington, Lancashire, England on March 23, 1829, to William Crompton and Sarah Low. The Crompton family immigrated to the United States in 1836 when George was nine and lived in Taunton, Massachusetts. Even early in his life, multiple sources cite Crompton's uncanny mechanical ability and problem-solving prowess.

In 1837, George's father William, who worked in the textile industry, invented the first fancy power loom. Since looms were certainly a part of George Crompton's childhood, his father's invention most likely began to lay the foundation for George's soon-to-be successful career.

== Education ==
Crompton attended elementary school in Belmont, England before his family moved to America. After the immigration, he attended public schools in Taunton and Worcester, Massachusetts. For secondary school he attended Millbury Academy in Worcester, the equivalent of a modern-day high school, and graduated in the normal time period. He did not attend college; rather, he gained occupation-specific experience as a part of the workforce. No mention is made of Crompton's level of achievement in school, subjects he was interested in, or personal opinions of his academic experience.

== Early career ==
After graduating from Millbury Academy, George Crompton held two separate positions, one in his father's office as a bookkeeper, and one as a mechanic for the Colt Company. Crompton saw the innovative skill of Samuel Colt, a manufacturer and owner of the Colt Company, on a daily basis. This insight into an inventor's mind most likely provided another basis for George Crompton's eventual knack for invention and keen business sense, in addition to his interest in the manufacturing industry.

Crompton's first venture took place in 1849, when the patent for his father's loom was about to expire. William Crompton suddenly became incapacitated, so his son took over the family business. This meant that George had to renew the fancy power loom's patent in Washington, D.C. At that time, patents were granted for fourteen years, and he believed that instability in the tariff rates had prevented the invention from achieving its highest profits during the patent's first term. Therefore, George called upon Edson Fessenden, conservator of William Crompton's estate, who gave George money to travel to Washington, D.C., to argue with the patent office. Despite George's young age and lack of experience, the patent office listened to his arguments and renewed the patent.

A few years after taking over the business, in 1851, Crompton joined Merrill E. Furbush, and together they manufactured looms in a factory in Worcester, concentrating on "narrow looms" until 1857. However, in 1854, a fire burned down the entire factory, and the two men were advised to declare bankruptcy due to debt. They refused to do so, however, and instead asked every single creditor for an extension and drove through the countryside to collect money to pay back the debt. After successfully warding off creditors, the two moved their business to Grove Street in Worcester.

It was after the move in 1857 that Crompton began to produce his most important invention, the Crompton Loom.

== Invention of the Crompton Loom ==
In 1857, after spending six years on "narrow looms", Crompton built and implemented a fast-operating broad fancy loom in an attempt to improve upon his father's invention. This new loom had twenty-four harnesses and three boxes at each end, and it could reach speeds of up to eighty-five picks per minute, a pace that almost doubled what even the most efficient loom could reach prior to Crompton's invention (forty-five picks per minute). As stated in an 1882 Los Angeles Times article, the Crompton Loom allowed mills to produce "cashmeres, fine flannels, fancy blankets, buggy robes, etc., and fancy colored stocking yarns". His improvements on his father's loom reduced the labor required to run looms by one half, and made looms easier to maintain and repair while also making them easier and less expensive to build. In all, the Crompton Loom allowed workers to create sixty percent more on a loom that was less expensive and easier to sustain, thus making the process much more efficient.

The Crompton Loom evolved from multiple acquisitions of patents throughout the 1850s and 1860s. Furbush and Crompton held multiple other patents that improved the "narrow looms", such as double reverse motion improvements. James Greenhalgh patented the first open-shed loom in 1852, but in 1857 the patent was found to be too close to William Crompton's power fancy loom, and therefore the Greenhalgh Loom patent was disallowed. William Crompton's patent expired the next year, and when it did, Crompton and Furbush purchased the rights to the Greenhalgh Loom, improved it in several ways, and called it the Crompton Loom. This 1857 version of the loom would improve again, however, until it became one of the best in the world at the Paris Exhibition in 1867, and later would become the standard fancy cotton loom of the United States (around 1870).

Two years after inventing his loom, Crompton broke his partnership with Furbush and formed Crompton Loom Works, which produced and marketed his loom. Since the invention benefited mills so much by making a tedious and expensive process easier with little cost, the Crompton Loom sold quite quickly and easily. This is proven by the fact that Crompton Loom Works produced and sold extraordinary amounts of Crompton looms during the Civil War, a time in which uniforms and blankets were needed in abundance. Since the American Civil War started in the early 1860s and the Crompton Loom was invented in 1857, one can say that the loom became an integral part of the textile industry quite soon after its invention.

== Corporate and political ventures ==
Due to the prolific nature of his product, Crompton received many offers from foreign firms to buy the rights to his product and act as a European distributor. A German firm run by the Schoenherr Brothers bought the rights to the Crompton loom and, contrary to the agreement, immediately cut off all contact with Crompton Loom Works. While the Brothers were supposed to pay fifty dollars in royalties per loom sold, Crompton never received any money. After numerous letters over a ten-year period, he traveled to Germany with a German lawyer to force the Schoenherr Brothers to pay. German courts were troubled by the fact that Crompton could not prove how many looms were manufactured in Germany, and when he tried to peer into the windows of the Schoenherr factory to count, German authorities arrested him on the grounds of breaking patent law. Crompton was quickly released and eventually won the case, yet he received almost no damage payment. Lawyers told him that the German courts would never side with a non-German. Because Crompton could not stop the Schoenherr Brothers, nothing prevented them from spreading his loom all throughout Europe, making it a standard and easily recreated technology.

Since he still made so much money in the domestic markets with the Crompton Loom Works, George Crompton had both the interest and the ability to invest in other Worcester corporations. He was founder and president of the Crompton Carpet Company, and paid over $200,000 upon the company's failure in 1878. He was also on the board of directors of the Worcester Gas Light Company, the Worcester National Bank, and the Hartford Steam Boiler Insurance Company. These corporate ventures proved that, along with his innovative skill, Crompton could be a successful businessman.

Like many wealthy men of his time, Crompton was involved in politics. He was alderman in Worcester from 1863 to 1864, and was a member of the common council of Worcester in 1860–1861. Crompton ran for mayor of Worcester in 1871 as the Republican candidate, and his loss was one of the greatest hindrances to his personal and political goals. He still remained active in the town, however, and presented a speech at the dedication of the Soldiers' Monument in 1874.

== Personal life ==
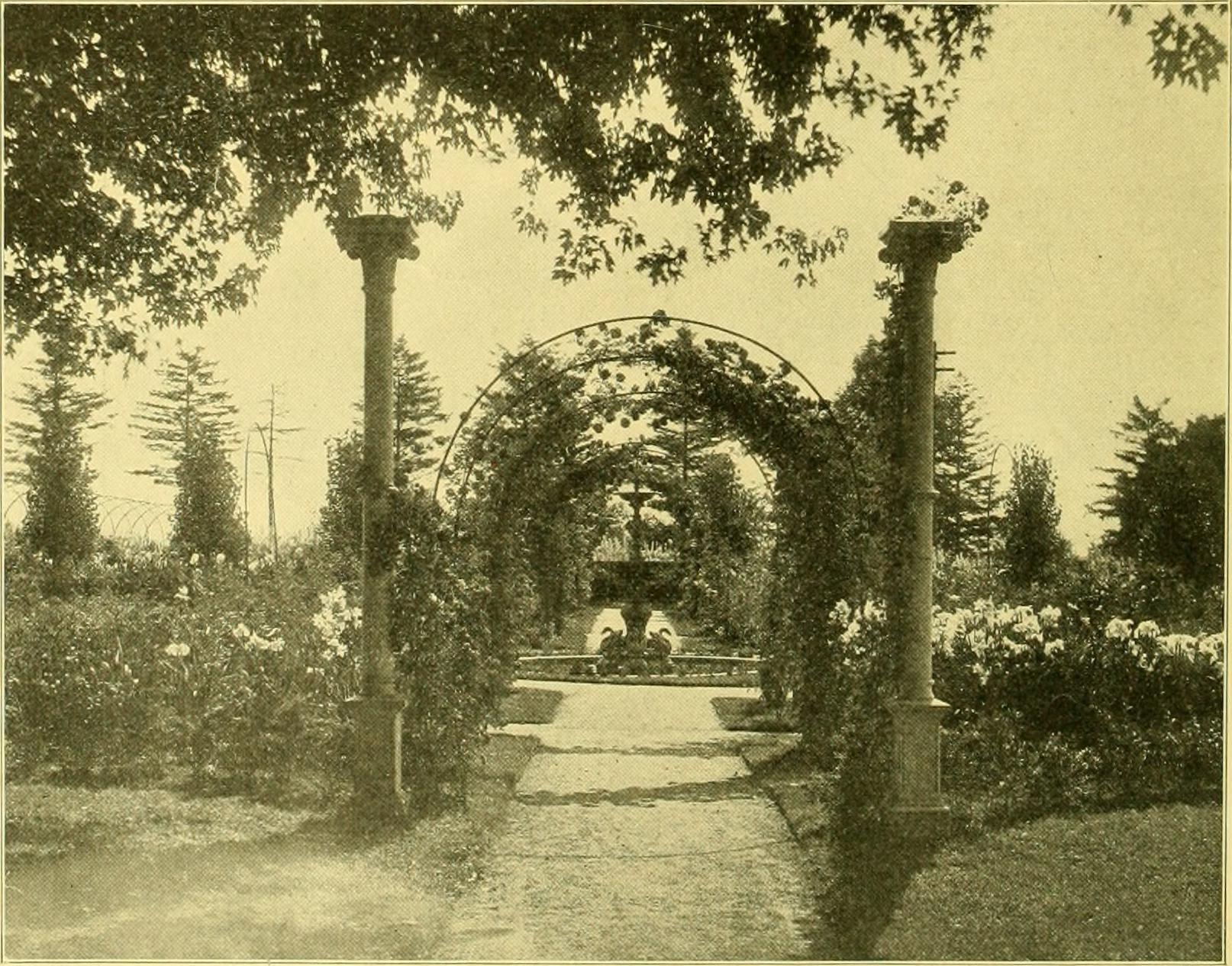
The Cromptons' rose garden was highlighted in a 1906 edition of a florist publication

After much success selling his loom in the late 1850s and early 1860s, Crompton bought a dozen acres of land in Worcester surrounding and including an Elizabethan-style mansion called "Mariemont", along with various other pieces of land throughout Worcester. He started a family, marrying Mary Christina Pratt in 1853, and had nine children who grew up in Mariemont. Although Crompton was technical and intellectual, he was also quite sociable. Mariemont always had guests, either friends of the nine children or friends of George and Mary. Besides being sociable, Crompton was also very learned. He enjoyed reading the many books he had in his libraries, and was said by some to be more learned than most men who had received a college education. He had a defined taste in art, loved to tell stories, and had a tendency to be adventurous. After living at Mariemont for nearly a quarter of a century, Crompton died at home on December 29, 1886. He is entombed at Rural Cemetery and Crematory in Worcester, MA.

== Awards and recognition ==
Crompton was recognized multiple times for his achievements in the textile industry. In 1867, he brought his looms to the Paris Exhibition, where he competed against similar technologies from Belgian, Saxon, English, Prussian, and French looms. According to a transoceanic telegram following the awards ceremony, Crompton's looms won a silver medal, a great recognition at such a prestigious event. In addition, Crompton's looms were present at the Centennial Exhibition in Philadelphia in 1876 where he received an award "for the best looms for fancy weaving hair on shawls, cassimeres, and satinets." In 1920, the Worcester County Trust Company wrote a book called "Forty Immortals of Worcester and Its Country", in which Crompton appeared. For Worcester's centennial celebration, the town included Crompton in a list of twenty-four men who the town felt represented Worcester. Crompton was inducted into the National Inventors Hall of Fame in 2007 because, according to the website, "Over his lifetime, George Crompton's inventive prowess revolutionized the textile industry."

== Legacy ==
Besides producing over one hundred patents surrounding the improvement of his loom, Crompton left behind a legacy that members of the Worcester community easily recognized. He continued his father's trend and successfully brought textile weaving to America from Britain. While Crompton lived in Worcester for the majority of his life, his impact could be felt throughout many New England towns; he brought areas formerly considered "pretty New England" towns into the forefront of the American Industrial Revolution. While Crompton's humility kept him from becoming one of the most celebrated and written about inventors, his Crompton Loom was widely used in the United States for many years, and Crompton Loom Works, which became Crompton & Knowles in 1897, lasted well into the twentieth century. In fact, Crompton & Knowles existed until 1999, when it merged with Witco Corporation to form Crompton Corporation. In 2005, Crompton Corporation merged with Great Lakes Chemical Corporation to form Chemtura Corporation, which in turn merged with Lanxess in 2017, the current manifestation of the original Crompton Loom Works.

== See also ==
- Crompton Corporation

== Patents (examples) ==
- Crompton, U.S. patent 11,933, "Loom: Improvement in harness-operating mechanism"
- Crompton, U.S. patent 80,608, "Loom: Improvement in looms"
- Crompton, U.S. patent 75,530, "Loom: Improvement in looms"
- Crompton, U.S. patent 229,968, "Loom: Shuttle box mechanism for looms"
