= Chemtura =

Former global corporation headquartered in Philadelphia, Pennsylvania

Chemtura Corporation
- Type: Subsidiary
- Traded as: NYSE: CHMT
- Industry: Chemicals, manufacturing
- Founded: 2005, Merger between Great Lakes Chemical Corporation and Crompton Corp.
- Headquarters: Philadelphia, Pennsylvania, U.S.
- Area served: Worldwide
- Key people: Craig A. Rogerson (Chairman, CEO & President)
- Number of employees: 2500 (2015)
- Parent: Lanxess
- Website: Chemtura.com

Chemtura Corporation was a global corporation headquartered in Philadelphia, Pennsylvania, United States, with its other principal executive office in Middlebury, Connecticut. Merged into Lanxess in 2017, the company focused on specialty chemicals for various industrial sectors, and these were transportation (including automotive), energy, and electronics. Chemtura operated manufacturing plants in 11 countries. Its primary markets were industrial manufacturing customers. The corporation employed approximately 2500 people for research, manufacturing, logistics, sales and administration. Operations were located in North America, Latin America, Europe and Asia. In addition, the company had significant joint ventures primarily in the United States. For the year ended December 31, 2015, the company's global core segment revenue was $1.61 billion. Chief executive officer was Craig A. Rogerson, who was also the president and chairman of the board of Chemtura Corporation. On April 21, 2017, Chemtura was acquired by the German chemical company Lanxess.

== History ==
=== Founding and early years ===
Chemtura Corporation was the successor to Crompton & Knowles Corporation, which was incorporated in Massachusetts in 1900 and engaged in the manufacture and sale of specialty chemicals beginning in 1954. Crompton & Knowles traces its roots to Crompton Loom Works incorporated in the 1840s.

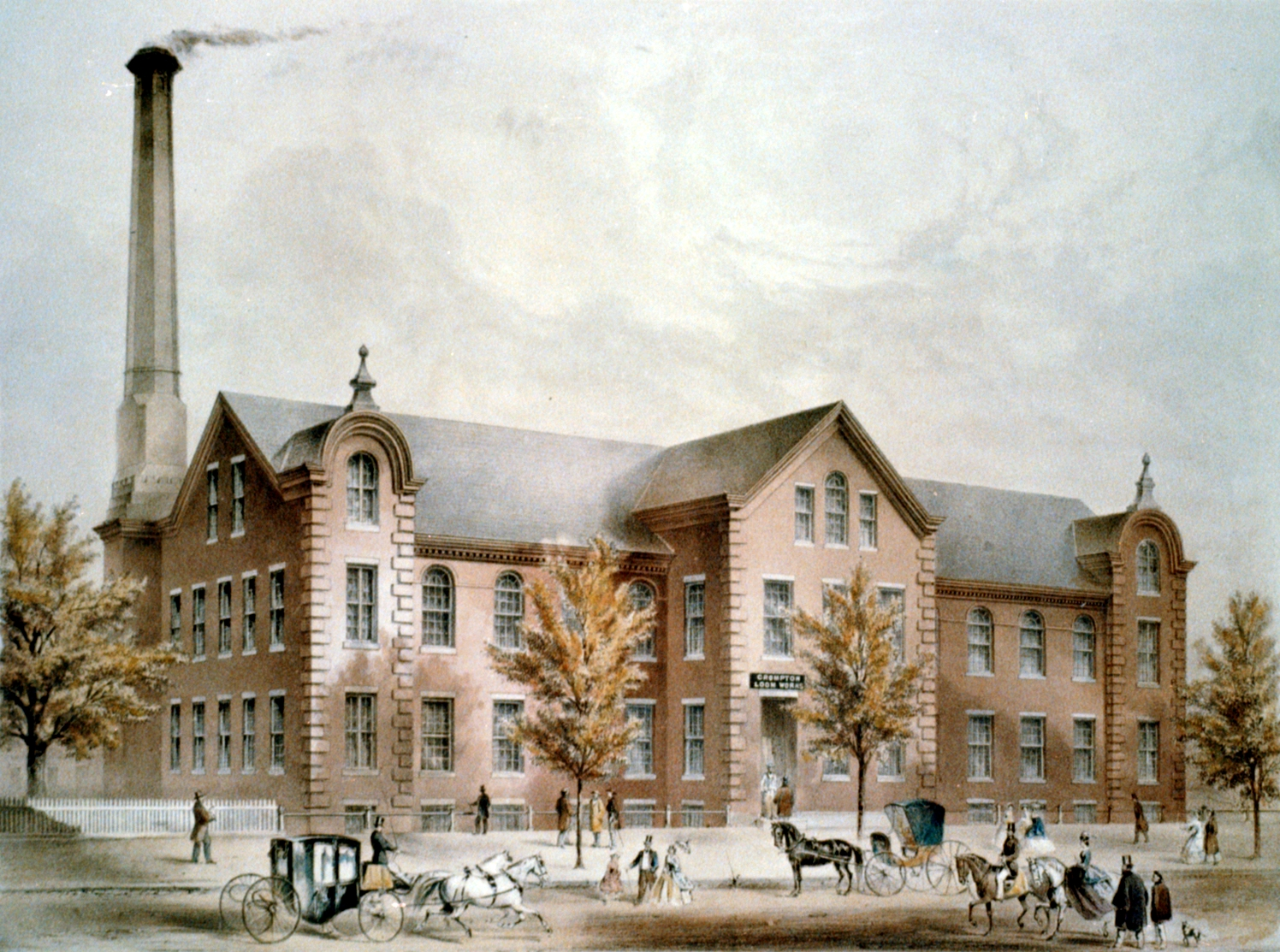
A 19th century print depicting the Crompton Loom Works

In the late 1800s, Worcester, Massachusetts was a leading manufacturing center that attracted inventors and manufacturers. Both William Crompton and Lucius J. Knowles made the city their home and opened their respective loom companies there. Both were the top loom manufacturers in the world. However each company based the method of weaving on a different premise. The companies later merged (in 1879), becoming one entity known as "Crompton & Knowles Loom Works". Still supplying the world market, the new company now applied both theories of weaving.

Meanwhile, in 1843 Charles Goodyear formed the Goodyear Metallic Rubber Shoe Company, Connecticut. A year later he patented the vulcanization of rubber. Goodyear's company then became one of nine companies that formed the founding of the United States Rubber Company in 1892 by Charles R. Flint also in Naugatuck, Connecticut. The rubber company manufactured a large array of products through two world wars, the Cold War, and became the Uniroyal company (Uniroyal Incorporated) in 1961.

In 1986, Uniroyal Chemical Company was formed as a subsidiary of Avery Inc. Then, in 1989, Uniroyal Chemical Company Investors Holding bought Uniroyal Chemical Company from Avery and became Uniroyal Chemical Corporation. In 1996, Uniroyal Chemical Corporation went public and merged with Crompton & Knowles. In 1999, Crompton & Knowles merged with Witco Corporation to form Crompton Corporation. In 2005, Crompton acquired Great Lakes Chemical Company, Inc., of West Lafayette, Indiana, to form Chemtura Corporation. Additionally, Great Lakes Chemical Corporation still existed as a subsidiary company of Chemtura. By January 2014 the company had manufactured and marketed a new brominated polymer flame retardant, replacing the traditional hexabromocyclododecane (HBCD) flame retardant.

=== Acquisitions and DIP (2007–2012) ===
By the end of January 2007 Chemtura completed stock acquisition and ownership of Kaufman Holdings Corporation with an all-cash transaction.

The corporation operated as a debtor-in-possession (DIP) under the protection of the United States Bankruptcy Court for the Southern District of New York from 10 March 2009 through 10 November 2010.

On September 26, 2012, Chemtura entered into a Business Transfer Agreement (BTA) with Solaris ChemTech Industries Limited, an Indian Company, and Avantha Holdings Limited, an Indian Company and the parent company of Solaris ChemTech. As provided in the BTA, Chemtura agreed to purchase from Solaris certain assets used in the manufacture and distribution of bromine and bromine chemicals for cash consideration of $142 million and the assumption of certain liabilities.

=== Acquisitions and sales (2012–2013) ===
In April 2013, Chemtura completed the sale of its Antioxidant business to SK Blue Holdings, Ltd, and Addivant USA Holdings Corp. for $97 million, $9 million in preferred stock issued by Addivant and the assumption by SK and Addivant of pension, environmental and other liabilities totaling approximately $91 million. Additionally, Chemtura paid $2 million in cash as part of a pre-closing adjustment.

On May 15, 2013, Chemtura purchased the remaining 50% interest in DayStar Materials L.L.C. from its joint venture partner, UP Chemical Company. As a result, DayStar became a consolidated entity. The purchase price was $3 million in cash which approximated the fair value of the remaining share of the assets and liabilities, primarily inventory and fixed assets, as of the purchase date. In addition, Chemtura reimbursed UP Chemical for a $3 million loan they had made to DayStar.

In December 2013, Chemtura completed sale of its Consumer Products business, including BioLab Inc. and dedicated manufacturing plants in the United States and South Africa, to KIK Custom Products Inc. for $300 million and the assumption by KIK of pension and other liabilities totaling approximately $8 million.

=== Recent developments (2014–2017) ===
On April 16, 2014, Chemtura entered into a "Stock and Asset Purchase Agreement" to sell its Chemtura AgroSolutions business, led by President and GM Nelson Gibson, to Platform Specialty Products Corporation for approximately $1 billion, consisting of $950 million in cash and 2 million shares of Platform's common stock. The sale became final on November 3, 2014. For the year ended December 31, 2015, the company's global core segment revenue was $1.61 billion.

On September 25, 2016, Chemtura announced they had accepted an offer from Lanxess AG of Germany of 33.50 per share, all cash. The boards of both companies unanimously approved the deal that September, with Chemtura's enterprise value estimated at US$2.7 billion. After US antitrust authorities approved the deal in December 2016, Chemtura shareholders approved the acquisition in February 2017. On April 21, 2017, Chemtura was officially acquired by Lanxess for $2.1 billion in cash. It was the largest acquisition in Lanxess' history, with Lanxess absorbing around 2,500 Chemtura employees at 20 sites in 11 countries.

== Products and distribution channels ==
Chemtura operated in various industries including automotive, construction, electronics, lubricants, packaging, plastics for durable and non-durable goods and transportation Most products were sold to industrial manufacturing customers for use as additives, ingredients or intermediates that add value to their end products. Additionally, the company considered itself a strong competitor in the global market, based on its ranking of its products within given sectors as defined by sector industries and operating segments.

=== Business segments ===
The company had two reporting segments: Industrial Performance Products, including the Petroleum Additives and Urethanes businesses; Industrial Engineered Products comprised the Great Lakes Solutions and Organometallic Specialties businesses.

==== Industrial Performance Products ====
This segment markets synthetic lubricants and greases, synthetic basestocks, lubricant additives, and urethanes.

==== Industrial Engineered Products ====
This segment marketed brominated performance products, flame retardants, fumigants, and organometallics.

== Locations and facilities ==
The company had plants in 11 countries, in locations such as Connecticut, New Jersey, Arkansas, Germany, Italy, China, Taiwan, Mexico, Brazil and the United Kingdom. On April 21, 2017, the company's locations were acquired by Lanxess.

== Legal ==
Firemaster 550 is one of Chemtura's brominated flame retardants. It is marketed as a flammability-decreasing additive for polyurethane foam used in upholstered furniture. As polyurethane foam ages and breaks down into fine dust, additives like Firemaster 550 can leach out and be absorbed, inhaled, or ingested. In a 2012 investigative series, the Chicago Tribune reported that a team of researchers detected harmful effects from Firemaster 550 at levels that were significantly lower than those used in the studies conducted on behalf of Chemtura.

In response to the studies linking flame retardants to accumulation in humans and resulting potential harm, California Governor Jerry Brown proposed a regulation phasing out flame-retardant chemicals in furniture. On January 15, 2013, Chemtura filed a lawsuit in Sacramento County Superior Court attempting to force the State of California to leave the old standards in place. In that lawsuit, the company alleges that Chemtura would be irreparably harmed if the proposed new regulation were not rescinded.

In November 2013, Governor Brown's Office announced publication of the new flammability standards, with mandatory compliance scheduled to begin on January 1, 2015. In mid-January 2014, Chemtura filed a lawsuit against the state of California alleging the (California) Bureau of Electronics and Appliance Repair, Home Furnishings, and Thermal Insulation failed to comply with its legislative mandate by issuing a revised fire safety standard that does not address the risk of ignition from open flame ignition sources. On September 30, 2014, California Governor Jerry Brown signed a bill requiring upholstered furniture labeling indicate whether the product contains toxic flame-retardant chemicals. This labelling requirement has triggered demand for furniture free of flame retardants.

== See also ==
- List of companies based in the Philadelphia area
- List of chemical companies
- List of largest chemical producers
