= BioLab Inc. =

American manufacturer of chemicals

BioLab Inc. is a division of KiK Consumer Products that specializes in the manufacturing of chemicals for use in swimming pools. The company has faced ongoing scrutiny regarding its problematic safety record, most recently following a fire at its Conyers, Georgia plant which put 90,000 citizens of the region under shelter-in-place restrictions.

== Company history ==
BioLab was founded in 1955 by Leon Bloom. Originally, it provided cleaning products to the poultry industry. The company pivoted into pool and spa chemicals with the release of BioGuard in 1962. It was sold to the Lonza group in 1979, after which Bloom retired. The company was then purchased in 1996 by Great Lakes Chemical Corporation which became Chemtura in a merger with Crompton Corporation. After Chemtura's bankruptcy, the company was acquired by Canadian company KiK consumer products, in January 2014, for a sum of 300 million.

In 2003, the company's headquarters moved to Lawrenceville, GA. At the time of Chemtura's bankruptcy, BioLab employed 4,750 employees, most of which were employed at facilities in Lawrenceville.

== Louisiana plant ==
The company acquired its Lake Charles, Louisiana plant in 2013. The original facility had been built in 1979, but was destroyed in 2020 after flooding from Hurricane Laura resulted in water coming into contact with water-reactive chemicals and burned the plant down. At the time of the fire, the plant was the second largest producer of trichloroisocyanuric acid (TCCA) and disodium isocyanurate. The plant being offline, compounded by the 2020 COVID pandemic, resulted in supply shortages that stretched into 2022. This plant was rebuilt in neighboring Westlake, Louisiana, following a $170M investment from KiK. Construction on the site started in June 2021 and the plant reopened in July 2022. In March 2023, a chlorine leak from a pipe in the facility resulted in a shelter in place order and the temporary shutting down of interstate I-10. In July 2024, the Louisiana site warehouse caught fire, resulting in a temporary shutdown of interstate I-10.

== Conyers plant ==
The company's Conyers plant was founded in 1973. At the time of the 2024 fire, the plant was Rockdale County's 8th largest employer, with 484 employees, as well as the company with the highest assessed property value at $113.4 million, representing 3% of the total assessed value of the county.

=== 2004 Conyers plant fire ===
On May 25, 2004, Plant 14 warehouse caught on fire. The building which housed roughly 12.5 million pounds of pool chemicals and oxidizers, was a total loss. The fire resulted in the mandatory evacuation of citizens within a 1.5 mile radius, and the closure of I-20, as well as a voluntary evacuation of citizens north of the now-closed highway. Media reported that 28 people visited hospitals as a result of the fire, with no major injuries.

More than 150 firefighters were involved in fighting the blaze, using nearly 10 million gallons of water, which required Rockdale county to purchase water from nearby DeKalb county to refill its water capacity. Losses for the company were estimated to be in excess of $50 million. The site of the warehouse was later redeveloped into another warehouse, breaking ground in 2019, which subsequently burned down in the 2024 fire.

=== 2020 Conyers plant fire ===
On September 14, 2020, a pipe connecting to a hot-water heater leaked, causing flooding in Plant 6 of the Conyers BioLab complex. The water came into contact with TCCA present on the floor, resulting in the flood water becoming milky-white. This was noticed by employees but soon afterwards began an exothermic decomposition. An employee wearing a respirator attempted to remove non-decomposing bags of TCCA in an attempt to isolate bags undergoing decomposition. After roughly 10 pallets had been moved, deteriorating conditions inside the warehouse made further removal too hazardous.

Rockdale County firefighters used water to spray decomposing bags of TCCA in the hopes of keeping the temperature of the reaction lower than the combustion temperature of the material. While no TCCA is reported to have caught on fire during this incident, decomposition vapors lead nine of the firefighters to be placed under observation at a local hospital. The total damage was estimated at over a million dollars.

Four days later, some of the TCCA that had been relocated to a semi-trailer caught on fire.

=== 2024 Conyers plant fire ===
On the morning of September 29, 2024, at around 5 a.m. EDT, a fire broke out on the roof of a warehouse in the Conyers complex, caused by a malfunctioning fire sprinkler, which drenched TCCA in water, causing a runaway fire and decomposition that sent upwards massive clouds of orange and black smoke. This smoke was visible from Hartsfield–Jackson Atlanta International Airport, 30 miles (48 km) away from the fire. The warehouse walls and roof later collapsed, and the fire was brought under control by 4 pm, although decomposition reactions producing toxic gasses were still happening.

The massive cloud of smoke and toxic decomposition products sparked evacuations and shelter-in-place orders for neighboring areas. Interstate 20 in Georgia was closed due to the event. Residents of Conyers were ordered to evacuate, and a shelter-in-place order was put into effect for all of Rockdale County. EPA air monitoring systems in the area detected chlorine, chloramine, and chlorine compounds produced by the decomposition of TCCA. Areas in Fulton County, Georgia reported a "haze and strong chemical smell".

Drifting clouds of gas forced the evacuation of some Piedmont Rockdale Hospital patients to Newton Hospital 10 miles (16 km) away, though the latter also faced a shelter-in-place order a few hours later.

In the week before the fire, the area had experienced the effects of Hurricane Helene, which brought heavy rain, winds, and flooding to the region, but it is unknown whether the storm had any influence on the fire.

By October 1, six lawsuits had been filed against BioLab and its parent company. Meanwhile, the Rockdale Emergency Management Agency (EMA) issued a daily 7 am to 7 pm shelter-in-place recommendation until Friday, October 4. They cautioned that, due to the effects of weather and inversion layers, air quality could worsen to "concerning levels" at night.

On October 3, the American Red Cross opened a shelter for evacuated residents at Fairview Recreation Center in Stockbridge, Georgia, roughly 15 miles (24 km) southwest of Conyers.

As of October 14, the EPA is providing updated air quality reports for Rockdale County every 12 hours.

=== Other incidents ===
A 2015 fire in an outside storage area of the plant was rapidly contained by Rockdale County Firefighters, but resulted in six firefighters being treated for non-life-threatening injuries.

Smaller fires were also reported in 2010 and 2016.
