= Brahms Mount =

Textile manufacturer

Brahms Mount is a textiles manufacturer, established in 1983 in Hallowell, Maine. It designs and creates a variety of soft furnishings in natural fibers, including blankets and throws, using traditional weaving techniques and antique equipment.

== History ==
The company was established as Brahms Mount Textiles by Claudia Brahms and Noel Mount. They purchased and renovated two buildings formerly used for Hallowell's granite manufacturing industry to create a textile mill and factory store overlooking the Kennebec River. Brahms comes from a family of interior and fashion designers and Mount comes from a linen weaving family in Northern Ireland.

Antique Crompton and Knowles W3 Shuttle power looms were sourced from Knox Mill, Bates Mill, Cascade Mill, and Biddeford Mill, and were Brahms Mount's first production looms.

In early 2009, David Kaufman, formerly of the broadcast industry, bought the company. David renamed it Brahms Mount. The company was later sold to Sferra Fine Linens LLC, and in 2022 was acquired by Faribault Woolen Mill Company.

== The company today ==
Brahms Mount manufactures cotton blankets and is also one of the only domestic manufacturers of top-of-bed linen woven from flax. Brahms Mount produces blankets, throws, linen towels and accessories, all made from natural fibers. Brahms Mount products have been carried by larger scale retail names, such as Neiman Marcus, as well as niche and speciality retailers in the U.S. and internationally. Products are also sold via the company's website, catalogs and factory store.

Claudia Brahms and Noel Mount continue to work with the company, designing fabric and providing engineering consultancy. In 2012, Brahms Mount acquired four more antique shuttle looms of the same vintage to increase production capacity. In 2013, having outgrown its original premises, the factory moved to a larger facility in Monmouth, Maine. The factory store was moved into a historic building in Freeport, Maine.
