= Tree Streets Historic District =

Tree Streets Historic District may refer to:

- Tree Streets Historic District (Johnson City, Tennessee), listed on the National Register of Historic Places in Washington County, Tennessee
- Tree Streets Historic District (Waynesboro, Virginia), listed on the National Register of Historic Places in Waynesboro, Virginia
