= Crompton Mill Historic District =

Historic district in Rhode Island, United States

- U.S. National Register of Historic Places
- U.S. Historic district
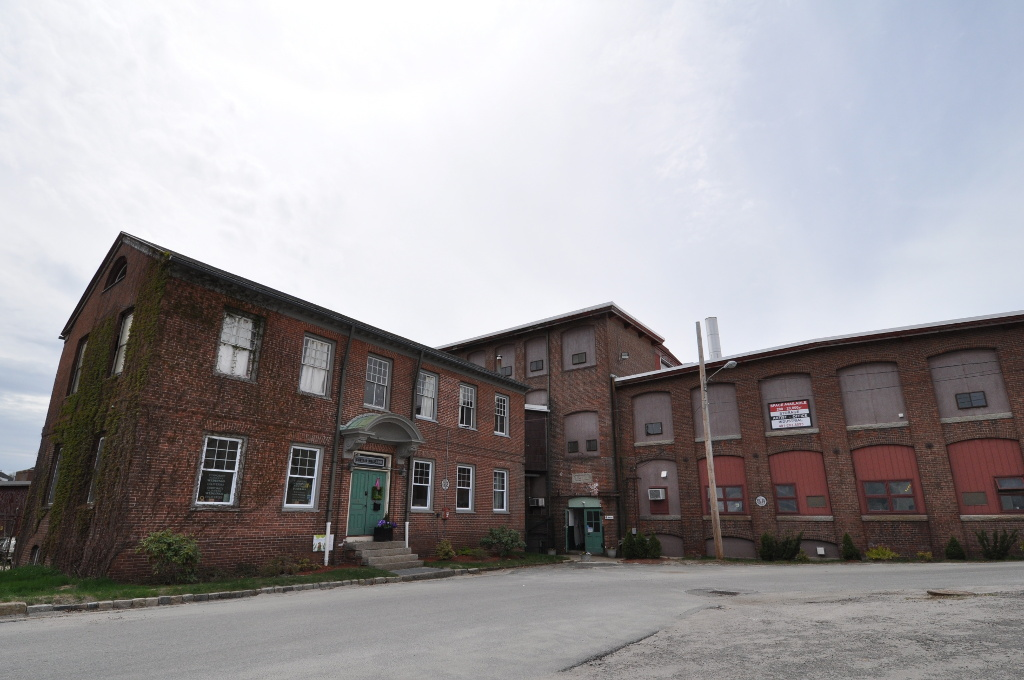

- Location within Rhode Island Location within the United States
- Location: West Warwick, Rhode Island
- Coordinates: 41°41′10″N 71°31′31″W
- Area: 5.12 acres (2.07 ha)
- Built: 1807
- NRHP reference No.: 06000577
- Added to NRHP: July 14, 2006

The Crompton Mill Historic District is a historic district encompassing a mill complex at 20 Remington Street, 53 and 65 Manchester Street in West Warwick, Rhode Island. The mill complex consists of a collection of mainly brick buildings, bounded by the Pawtuxet River and Pulaski, Remington, and Manchester Streets in the village of Crompton. The mill complex formerly extended across the river, but the complex on the west bank was destroyed by fire in 1992. The oldest elements of the complex are the dam site and some of the raceways that provided water power to the mills. The present dam was built in 1908, replacing an 1882 structure. The raceways were built in 1807, around the time of the first mill buildings. The stone Mill No. 1, built 1807, is believed to be the oldest stone mill building in the state. Most of the complex's buildings were built in the late 19th and early 20th centuries by the Providence Manufacturing Company and its successors. The mill was used for textile (mainly cotton) processing until 1946, when the Crompton Corporation ended production.

The district was listed on the National Register of Historic Places in 2006.

== See also ==
- Crompton Loom Works
- Crompton-Shenandoah Plant
- National Register of Historic Places listings in Kent County, Rhode Island
