= GLCC =

GLCC may refer to:

- Great Lakes Chemical Corporation
- Great Lakes Christian College
- Gas Light and Coke Company
