= Robert Wishnick =

American businessman (1892–1980)

Robert Isidore Wishnick (April 5, 1892—February 14, 1980) was the founder of Witco Corporation, who served as its president (1920–1955), chairman of the board (1955–1963), and chairman emeritus (from 1975 until his death).

== Life ==
Robert Wishnick was born in the village of Kolchino, Kaluga Governorate of the Russian Empire, the youngest child to father Eli Wishnick, a Talmudic scholar and part-time rabbi, and mother Minnie Wishnick. Robert's father and his eldest brother emigrated to the United States in 1896, and Robert and his mother followed them in 1898. At the age of seven, Wishnick severely broke his right arm in an accident, and as there were no specialists available in the area to treat a break that complex, half of his arm had to be amputated.

Focusing more on intellectual rather than physical pursuits from then on, Wishnick, while in high-school, won a one-year scholarship to the Armour Institute of Technology (now Illinois Institute of Technology). While in college, he put himself through school with income from working as a salesman. He earned his degree in chemical engineering in 1914, started working as a chemist with the American Magnesium Products Company, served as a night clerk of a cigar stand in his spare time, and continued working on a law degree from Chicago's Kent College of Law during nights. He received his law degree in 1917, but would never actually practice law in life.

Wishnick's early career in chemistry is notable for a perilous incident during his first employment with the American Magnesium Products Company, which was reselling floor wax, complementing its own line of magnesite floor materials. Wishnick's belief was that the company should produce its own floor wax, and in pursuit of this goal he started working on developing his own blend. While boiling the mixture on the factory floor, Wishnick got distracted, and as a result the mixture boiled over and led to an uncontrollable blaze which burned the whole factory and an adjacent warehouse to the ground.

After the accident, Wishnick started working as a salesman for A. Dager & Company in 1918. A year later, at his boss' wedding, he met Freda Frankel, the college roommate of the bride. The two fell in love, married just forty-one days after their meeting, and stayed married for over fifty years. Their daughter Betty June was born in 1921.

In 1920, a disagreement about commissions at Dager forced Wishnick to rethink his employment. Together with brothers David and Julius Trumpeer, Wishnick started a new company, called Wishnick-Trumpeer Chemical Company at inception. The company would buy various chemicals in bulk throughout the Midwest, and resell them in smaller batches in Chicago. Wishnick retained the majority (51%) ownership in the company, the two Trumpeer brothers held 10% each, and the rest was split among several smaller investors. By 1923, the company grew to the point where it opened a branch office in New York, which Wishnick started to run in 1924. In November 1924, Wishnick's son William was born.

In 1944, the name of the company was changed to Witco Chemical Company. Wishnick served as its president until 1955, when he became the chairman of the Board as the company made several significant acquisitions. He had continued to serve in that position until 1964, after which he passed the position to his son William and became the Chairman of the Finance and Executive Committees himself. In 1975, Wishnick became Chairman Emeritus of the company, a position he would hold until his death in 1980. He died on February 14, 1980 at his home in Manhattan and was interred in Mount Pleasant Cemetery in New York.

== Sources ==
- Wishnick, William (1976). The Witco Story. The Newcomen Society of North America.
- Derdak, Thomas, ed. (1988). International Directory of Company Histories. Vol. 1. Chicago and London: St. James Press.
- Clark, Alfred E. (February 15, 1980). "Robert Wishnick, 87; Founder and Executive of Chemical Company; Helped Civic Groups". The New York Times. Section B, p. 17.
