= Crompton-Shenandoah Plant =

- U.S. National Register of Historic Places
- Virginia Landmarks Register
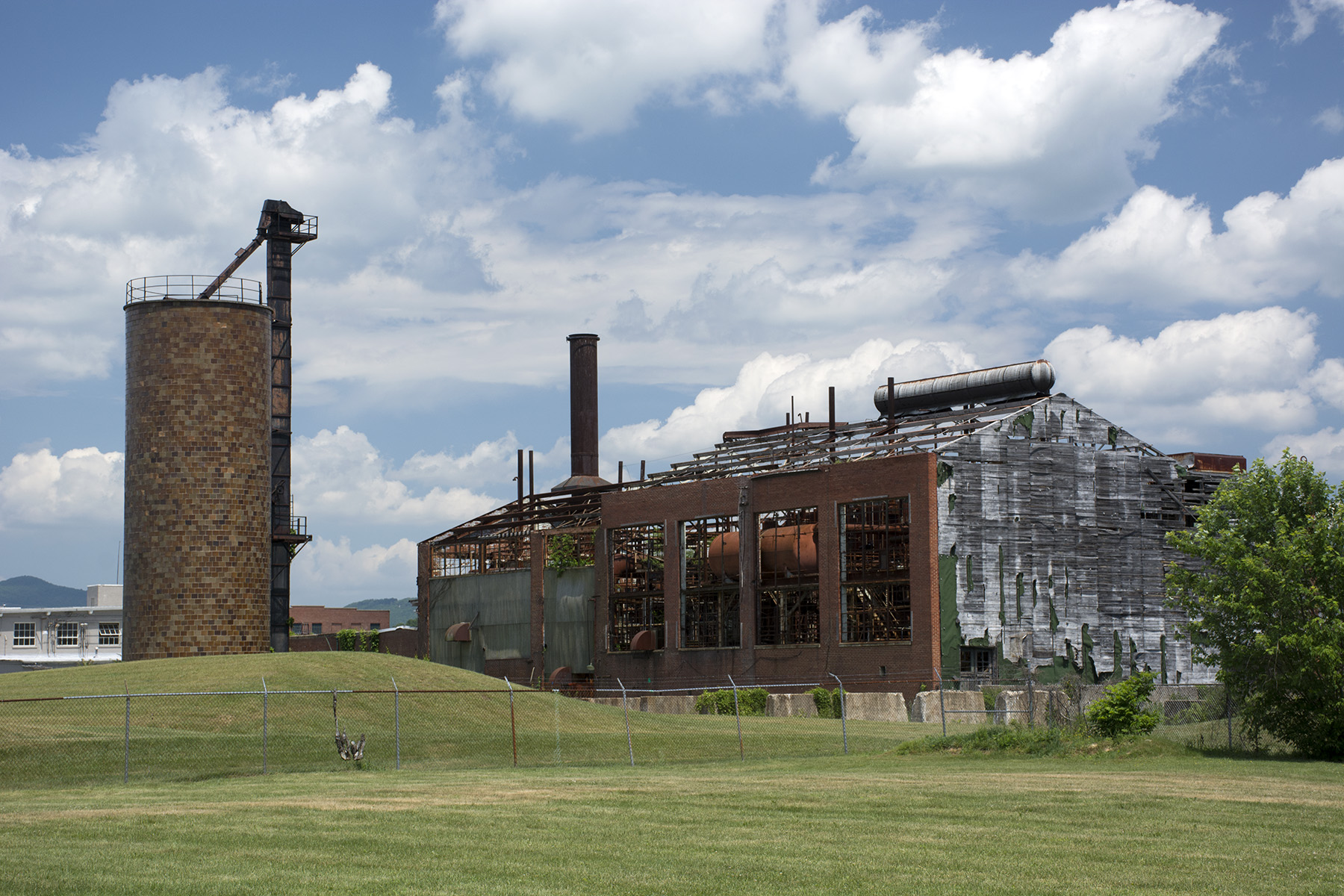

- Location within Virginia Location within the United States
- Location: 200 W. 12th St., Waynesboro, Virginia
- Coordinates: 38°03′48″N 78°53′18″W
- Area: 40.885 acres (16.546 ha)
- Built: 1926, 1936–1939, 1947–1948
- Built by: Southeast Construction Co.
- Architect: Barker & Turoff, Harry Graham Co.
- NRHP reference No.: 11000555
- VLR No.: 136-5056

Significant dates
- Added to NRHP: August 18, 2011
- Designated VLR: June 16, 2011

Crompton-Shenandoah Plant, also known as The Mill at South River, is a historic textile factory complex located at Waynesboro, Virginia, United States. The complex includes 11 contributing buildings and 8 contributing structures involved in the dyeing and finishing of the gray corduroy and velveteen goods. The historic buildings and structures were built beginning in 1926 through 1948. The complex includes two plant buildings, a machine shop/supply storage building, a former enameling plant, a boiler house, a water softener building, a chemical storage building, a lab, a gate house/personnel office, an office building and a retail store. The factory closed in the 1980s along with most Crompton Corporation plants.

It was added to the National Register of Historic Places in 2011.

== See also ==
- Crompton Loom Works
- Crompton Mill Historic District
