= Virginia Metalcrafters Historic District =

Historic district in Virginia, United States

- Virginia Metalcrafters Marketplace and Historic District
- U.S. National Register of Historic Places
- U.S. Historic district
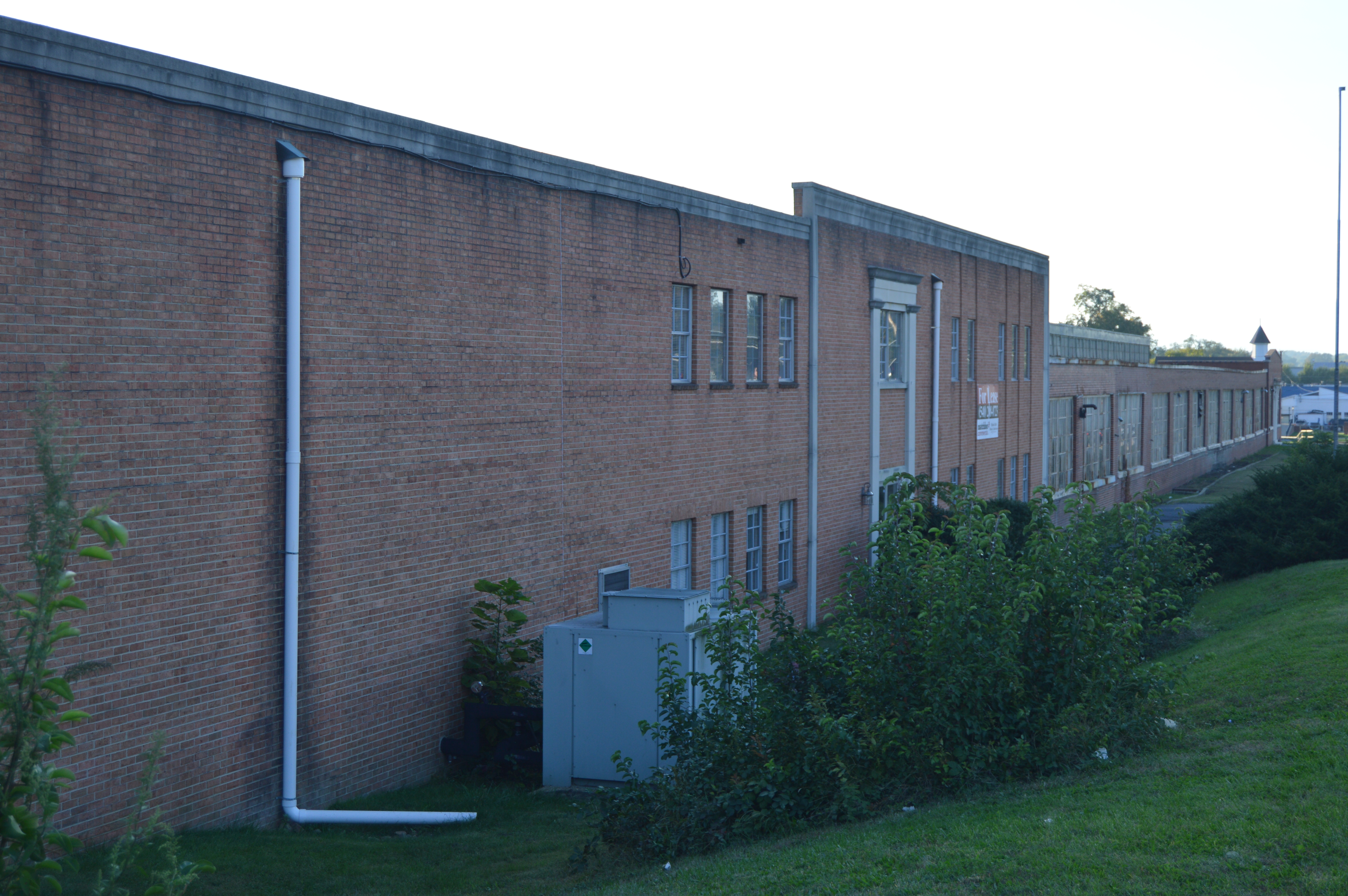
- Front of the main building

- Location within Virginia Location within the United States
- Location: 1010 E. Main St., Waynesboro, Virginia
- Coordinates: 38°3′51″N 78°52′22″W
- Area: 9.4 acres (3.8 ha)
- Built: 1925
- NRHP reference No.: 15000810
- Added to NRHP: November 16, 2015

The Virginia Metalcrafters Marketplace and Historic District encompasses a historic industrial complex at 1010 East Main Street in Waynesboro, Virginia. The complex includes one large multi-section brick factory, a number of small outbuildings (most in deteriorated condition), and the ruins of at least one collapsed building. The district is named for the Virginia Metalcrafters Company, which operated out of the complex from 1925 until 2006 and produced reproduction hardware for historic sites including Colonial Williamsburg, Mystic Seaport, and Old Salem.

The building was added to the National Register of Historic Places in 2015.

The complex was purchased in 2013 by VM Acquisitions and is being renovated as a Virginia Metalcrafters Marketplace with a focus on craftsmanship. Basic City Beer Co. was the first occupant to renovate and begin production of beer within the facility starting in 2016. They currently occupy a portion of the original foundry and the Showroom. The brewery is expanding to include a music venue called The Foundry opening in March 2023 and a restaurant. Common Wealth Crush now occupies a portion of the main building. They work with local winemakers to produce small batch wines in their facility with plans for a tasting room to open in 2023. A local coffee roaster will occupy the building as well.

Renovation work continues on the sawtooth portion of the building, and will provide space for additional tenants.

== See also ==
- National Register of Historic Places listings in Waynesboro, Virginia
