= Good Shepherd Anglican Church (Waynesboro, Virginia) =

Anglican church in Waynesboro, Virginia, US

- Bethany Lutheran Church
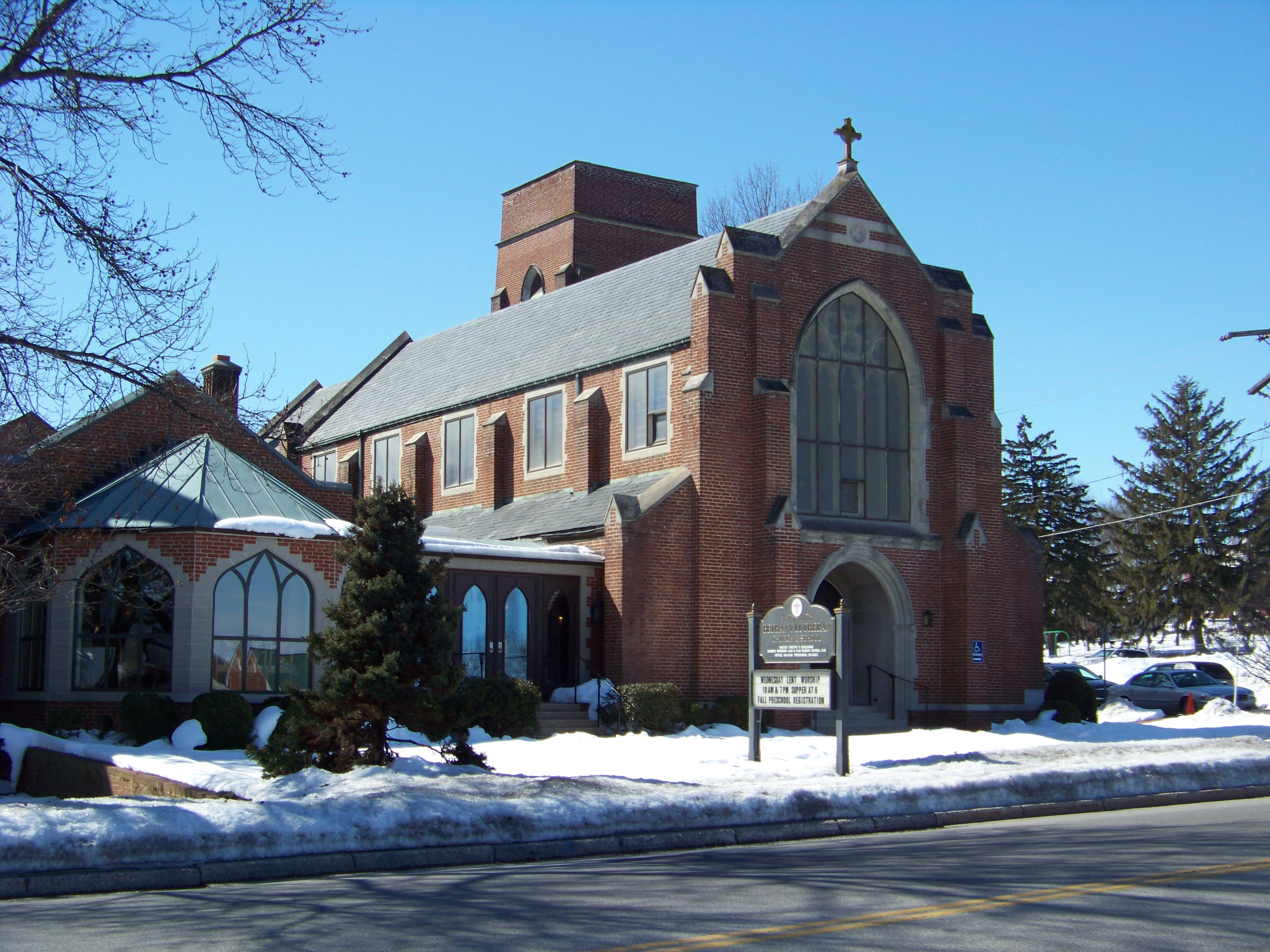
- Good Shepherd Anglican Church
- Good Shepherd Anglican Church
- 38.0689°N 78.8929°W
- Location: Waynesboro, Virginia
- Country: United States
- Denomination: United Episcopal Church of North America
- Previous denomination: Lutheran Church – Missouri Synod
- Website: waynesboroanglican.com

History
- Founded: 2018

Architecture
- Architect: William Collins
- Style: Gothic Revival
- Groundbreaking: 1925
- Completed: 1925
- Construction cost: $63,000 ($1.16 million in 2025)

Specifications
- Capacity: 150
- Materials: Brick, limestone

Administration
- Diocese: East

Clergy
- Rector: Peter D. Robinson
- Bethany Lutheran Church
- U.S. National Register of Historic Places
- U.S. Historic district – Contributing property
- NRHP reference No.: 01001511
- Added to NRHP: January 24, 2002

Good Shepherd Anglican Church is an Anglican church in Waynesboro, Virginia, United States. It is part of the United Episcopal Church of North America (UECNA), a Continuing Anglican denomination. It was formed in 2018 and bought the former Bethany Lutheran Church building in downtown Waynesboro in 2019. The building features large lancet windows, a bell tower and side aisles among other characteristic features of Gothic Revival churches. The building is a contributing property to the Waynesboro Downtown Historic District listed on the National Register of Historic Places.

== History ==
Bethany Lutheran Church traces its origins to 1772. It eventually became part of the Lutheran Church – Missouri Synod. In 1923, the congregation decided to relocate from its deteriorating rural building to downtown Waynesboro. The church building was built in 1923–25 to a design likely by William Collins of the firm of T.J. Collins & Son and with a construction cost of $63,000 ($1.16 million in 2025).

By 2014, Bethany had grown to 300 members and two services in its 150-seat sanctuary. The church evaluated the feasibility of expanding on its site. Ultimately, the church moved to a 13-acre (5.3 ha) tract in nearby Fishersville.

Good Shepherd Anglican Church was founded in 2018 as part of the UECNA and bought the former Bethany building in 2019.

== Architecture ==
GSAC is designed in a Gothic Revival style characteristic of the 1920s. It features a large lancet window in the front north gable. Other stained glass lancet windows feature stone tracery. The nave has four bays on each side, with side aisles. A square entrance tower rises near the rear of the church. The south elevation, above the altar, features three narrow lancet windows.

The church's walls are faced with dark red brick, with light-colored Indiana limestone used for accents such as door and window surrounds, the water table, and coping on buttresses and parapets. The brick is laid in three-course American bond.

The nave is attached to a one-story educational wing completed in 1952 and expanded in 1990 to a design by Eldon Wood.

== Preservation ==
The church has a contributing property to the Waynesboro Downtown Historic District since 2002.
