= Waynesboro Downtown Historic District =

Historic district in Virginia, United States

- U.S. National Register of Historic Places
- U.S. Historic district
- Virginia Landmarks Register
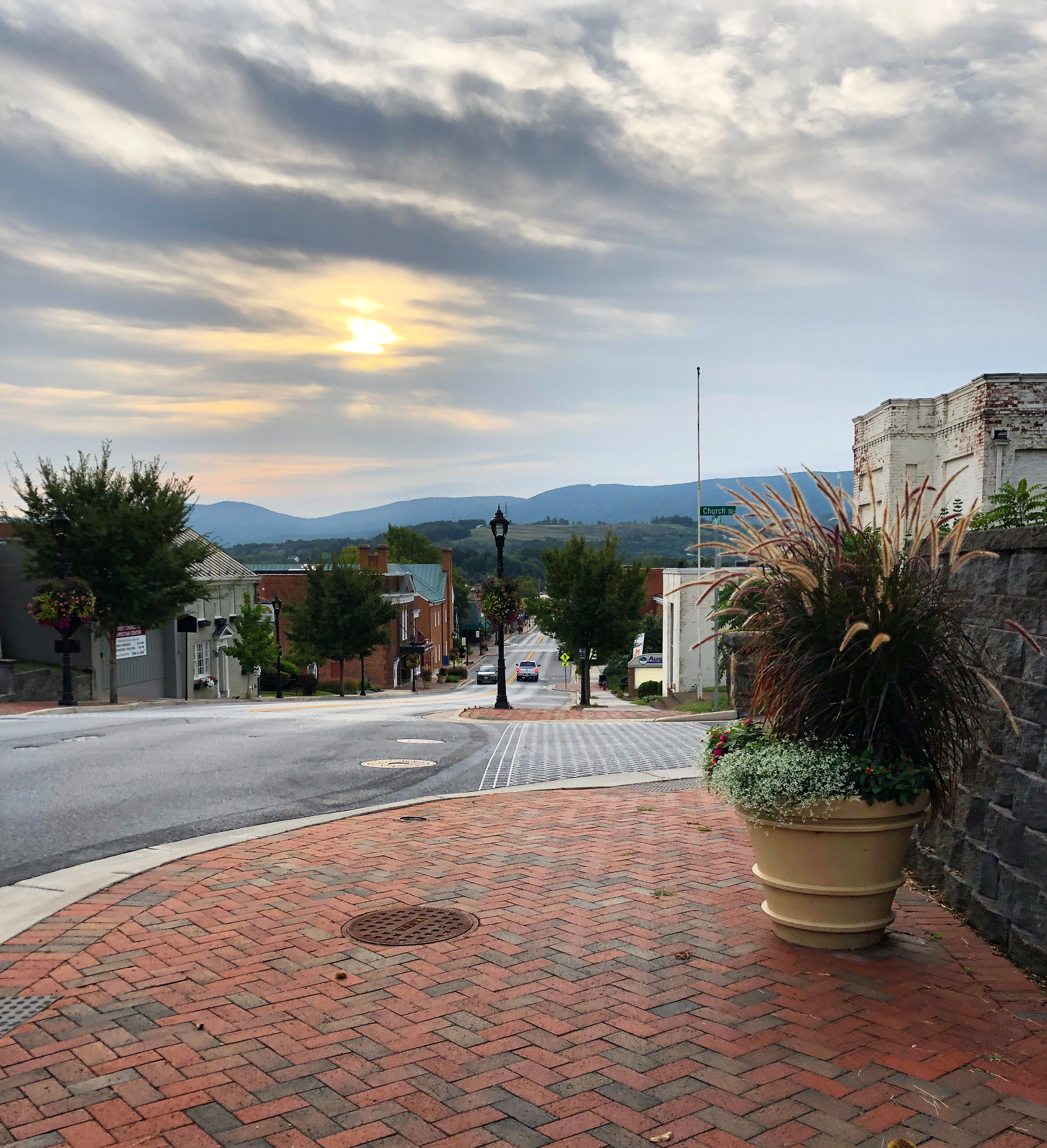
- Downtown Waynesboro showing Main Street looking West

- Location within Virginia Location within the United States
- Location: Federal St., Main St., Wayne Ave., Waynesboro, Virginia
- Coordinates: 38°4′8″N 78°53′25″W
- Area: 16 acres (6.5 ha)
- Built: 1806
- Architectural style: Federal, Italianate, et al.
- NRHP reference No.: 01001511
- VLR No.: 136-5048

Significant dates
- Added to NRHP: January 24, 2002
- Designated VLR: June 13, 2001

The Waynesboro Downtown Historic District is a national historic district in Waynesboro, Virginia. In 2002, it included 43 contributing buildings in the compact central business district of Waynesboro. The district includes churches, houses, mixed-use commercial buildings, banks, specialty stores, offices, a hotel, restaurants, and parking lots. Notable buildings include the First National Bank (1908–09), the former Bethany Lutheran Church (1925), the LB&B Building (1929), and the General Wayne Hotel (1937-1938).

It was listed on the National Register of Historic Places in 2002.

== See also ==
- Port Republic Road Historic District
- Tree Streets Historic District (Waynesboro, Virginia)
