= Rose Cliff =

Historic house in Virginia, United States

- U.S. National Register of Historic Places
- U.S. Historic district – Contributing property
- Virginia Landmarks Register
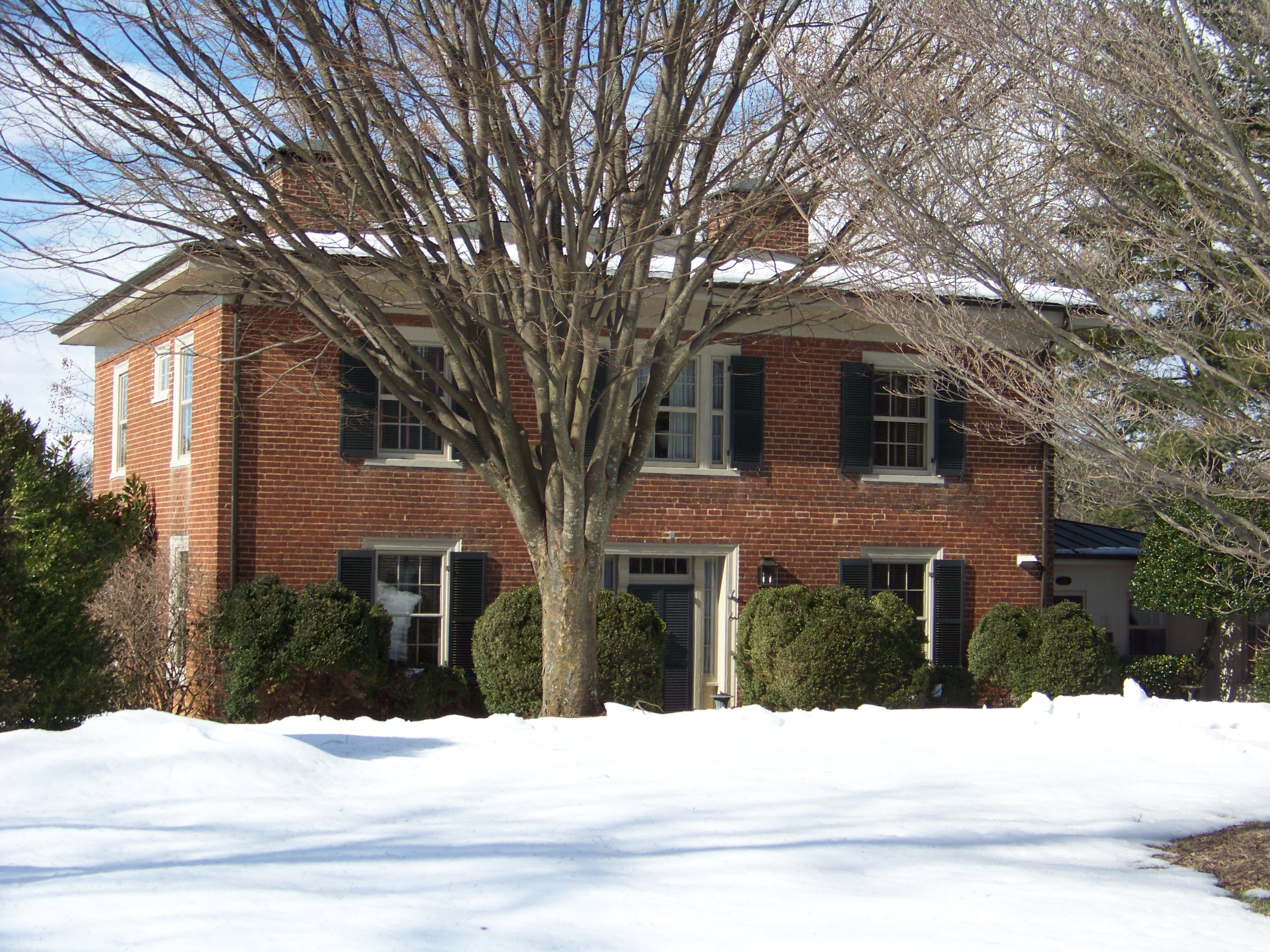
- Rose Cliff, February 2010

- Location within Virginia Location within the United States
- Location: 835 Oak Ave., Waynesboro, Virginia
- Coordinates: 38°3′43″N 78°54′9″W
- Area: 1.6 acres (0.65 ha)
- Built: c. 1850
- Architectural style: Greek Revival
- NRHP reference No.: 06000755
- VLR No.: 136-5051

Significant dates
- Added to NRHP: August 30, 2006
- Designated VLR: June 8, 2006

Rose Cliff, also known as Rose Cliff Fruit Farm, is a historic home located at Waynesboro, Virginia. It was built about 1850, and is a two-story, three-bay, Greek Revival style brick Shenandoah Valley farmhouse. It has a central passage/double-pile plan under a hipped roof. It was once the center of a thriving apple operation that lasted from the late-19th century until 1930.

It was listed on the National Register of Historic Places in 2006. It is located in the Tree Streets Historic District.
