= Port Republic Road Historic District =

Historic district in Virginia, United States

- U.S. National Register of Historic Places
- U.S. Historic district
- Virginia Landmarks Register
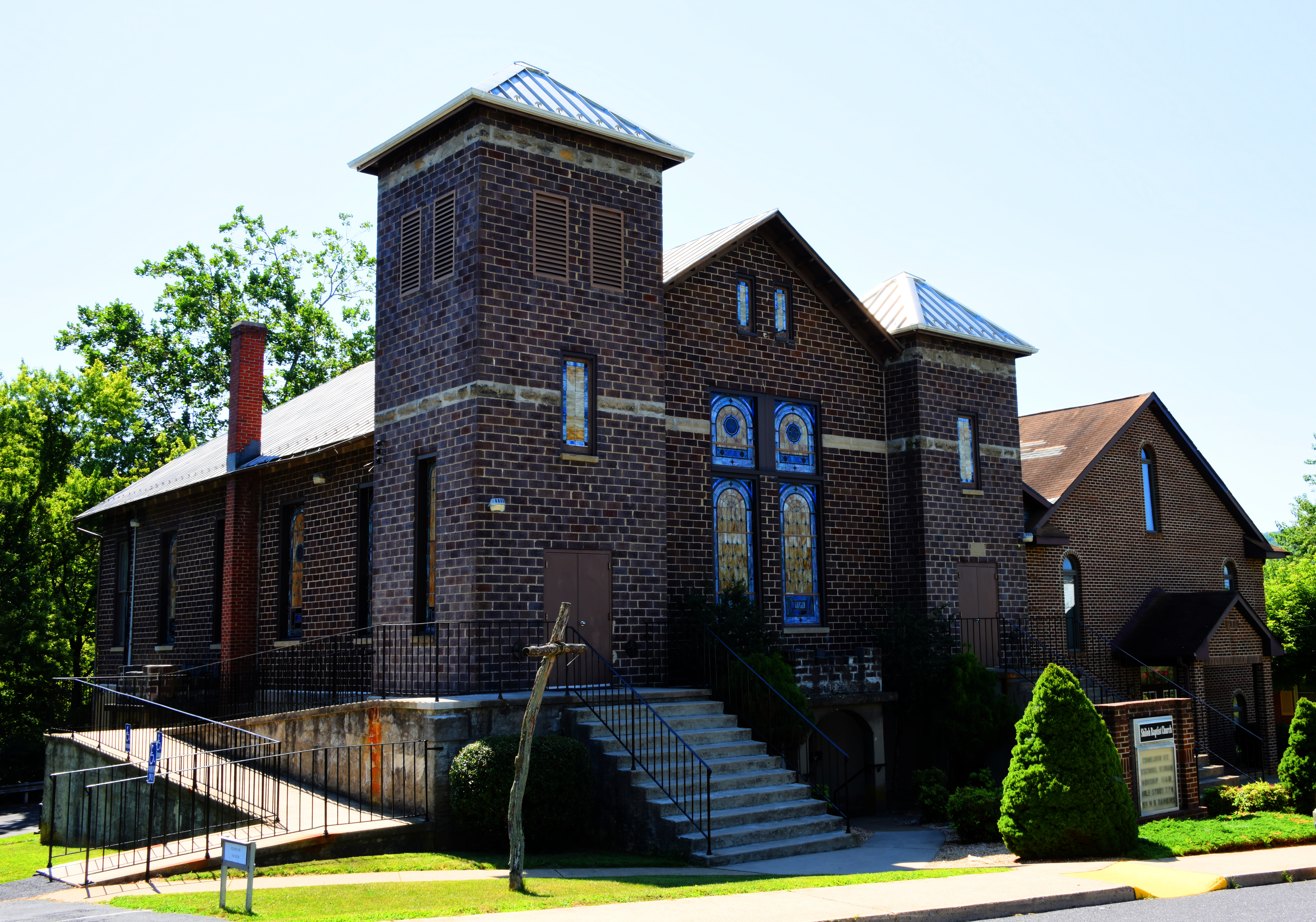
- Shiloh Baptist Church

- Location within Virginia Location within the United States
- Location: Alpha, Beta, Elkton Sts., Fairview Ave., Fontaine St., Minden Pl., Port Republic Rd., Riverside Dr. and Shiloh Ave., Waynesboro, Virginia
- Coordinates: 38°4′26″N 78°53′10″W
- Area: 35 acres (14 ha)
- Architect: Fuller, Jacob
- Architectural style: Federal, Italianate
- NRHP reference No.: 02000368
- VLR No.: 136-5054

Significant dates
- Added to NRHP: April 12, 2002
- Designated VLR: December 5, 2001

The Port Republic Road Historic District is a national historic district in Waynesboro, Virginia. In 2002, it included 83 buildings deemed to contribute to the historic character of the area, plus one other contributing structure and one contributing site, a foundation. They include buildings such as houses, garages, sheds, commercial buildings, churches, and meeting halls, and structures such as carports and animal sheds. The historically African-American neighborhood developed after the American Civil War. Notable buildings include the Shiloh Baptist Church (1924), the early-20th century Elks and Abraham lodges, the Rosenwald School, which incorporates a 1938-39 auditorium/gymnasium, and Tarry's Hotel (1940).

It was listed on the National Register of Historic Places in 2002.

== See also ==
- Tree Streets Historic District (Waynesboro, Virginia)
- Waynesboro Downtown Historic District
