= Wynne Crompton =

Welsh footballer (1907–1988)

Personal information
- Date of birth: 11 February 1907
- Place of birth: Gwersyllt, Denbighshire, Wales
- Date of death: May 1988 (aged 81)
- Place of death: Glyndŵr, Clwyd, Wales
- Position: Defender

Senior career*
Years	Team	Apps	(Gls)
1930–1931	Wrexham		

International career
1930–1931	Wales	3	(0)
- * Club domestic league appearances and goals

Wynne Crompton (11 February 1907 – May 1988) was a Welsh international footballer. He was part of the Wales national football team between 1930 and 1931, playing 3 matches. He played his first match on 25 October 1930 against Scotland and his last match on 22 April 1931 against Ireland.

At club level, he played for Wrexham in the early 30s.

== See also ==
- List of Wales international footballers (alphabetical)
