= Coiner–Quesenbery House =

Historic house in Virginia, United States

- U.S. National Register of Historic Places
- Virginia Landmarks Register
- Location within Virginia Location within the United States
- Location: 332 W. Main St., Waynesboro, Virginia
- Coordinates: 38.068347°N 78.888470°W
- Area: less than one acre
- Built: 1806
- Architectural style: Federal
- NRHP reference No.: 76002232
- VLR No.: 136-0001

Significant dates
- Added to NRHP: November 7, 1976
- Designated VLR: June 15, 1976

The Coiner–Quesenbery House, also known as Casper Coiner House, is a historic home located at Waynesboro, Virginia. It was built in 1806, and is a two-story, three-bay, Federal style house. The house originally had a hall and parlor plan, later modified in the 1820s–1830s to a more conventional side hall plan.

It was listed on the National Register of Historic Places in 1976.
