= Dennis Crompton (footballer) =

English footballer

Personal information
- Date of birth: 12 March 1942
- Place of birth: Bolton, England
- Date of death: 28 July 2015 (aged 73)
- Position: Wing half

Senior career*
Years	Team	Apps	(Gls)
1958–1959	Wigan Athletic	1	(0)
1959–1963	Bolton Wanderers	0	(0)
1963–1964	Doncaster Rovers	23	(0)
1964–1967	Wigan Athletic	121	(16)
1967–1968	Altrincham		
1968–1969	Wigan Athletic	2	(0)
- * Club domestic league appearances and goals

Dennis Crompton (12 March 1942 – 28 July 2015) was an English professional footballer who played as a wing half.

Born in Bolton, Crompton played for Wigan Athletic, Bolton Wanderers, Doncaster Rovers and Altrincham.

He died on 28 July 2015 after a long illness, aged 73.
