= Richard Crompton =

- Born: Manchester
- Occupations: Author, journalist
- Writing career
- Language: English
- Genre: Crime fiction
- Notable works: Hour of the Red God (US)/The Honey Guide (UK), Hell's Gate
- Website: richardcrompton.com

Richard Crompton is a Manchester-born British journalist, and author of crime fiction featuring Mollel, a Maasai detective in Kenya.

Crompton, a former journalist for the BBC, moved to Kenya in 2005 with his wife, a human rights lawyer, who took up a job to prosecute the perpetrators of the Rwandan genocide.

In 2007 Crompton covered the post-election violence in Kenya for CNBC.

In 2010 Crompton won the Daily Telegraph ghost story competition with his short story inspired by Facebook titled Friends.

In 2013 his first novel was published as The Honey Guide in the UK/Commonwealth and Hour of the Red God in the US/Canada. The novel features Detective Mollel, a Maasai police detective with the Kenyan CID.

== Works ==
- The Honey Guide in the UK/Commonwealth and Hour of the Red God in US/Canada
- Hell's Gate
