= Crompton Corporation =

Former chemical company

- Crompton Corporation logo
- Type: Merged
- Predecessor: Crompton Loom Works; Crompton & Knowles Loom Works; Witco Corporation
- Founded: Worcester, Massachusetts (1837)
- Founder: William Crompton
- Defunct: 2005
- Fate: Acquired by Chemtura Corporation
- Successor: Chemtura Corporation
- Headquarters: Middlebury, Connecticut, United States
- Area served: International
- Products: Fine chemicals, inorganic compounds

Crompton Corporation (NYSE: CK, formerly Crompton and Knowles) was a chemical research, production, sales and distribution company headquartered in Middlebury, Connecticut. The company produced specialty chemicals used for polymers, fire suppressants and retardants, pool and spa water purification systems and various other applications. In 2005, Crompton merged with Great Lakes Chemical Corporation to become Chemtura.

It was listed on the New York Stock Exchange under CK ticker symbol.

== History ==
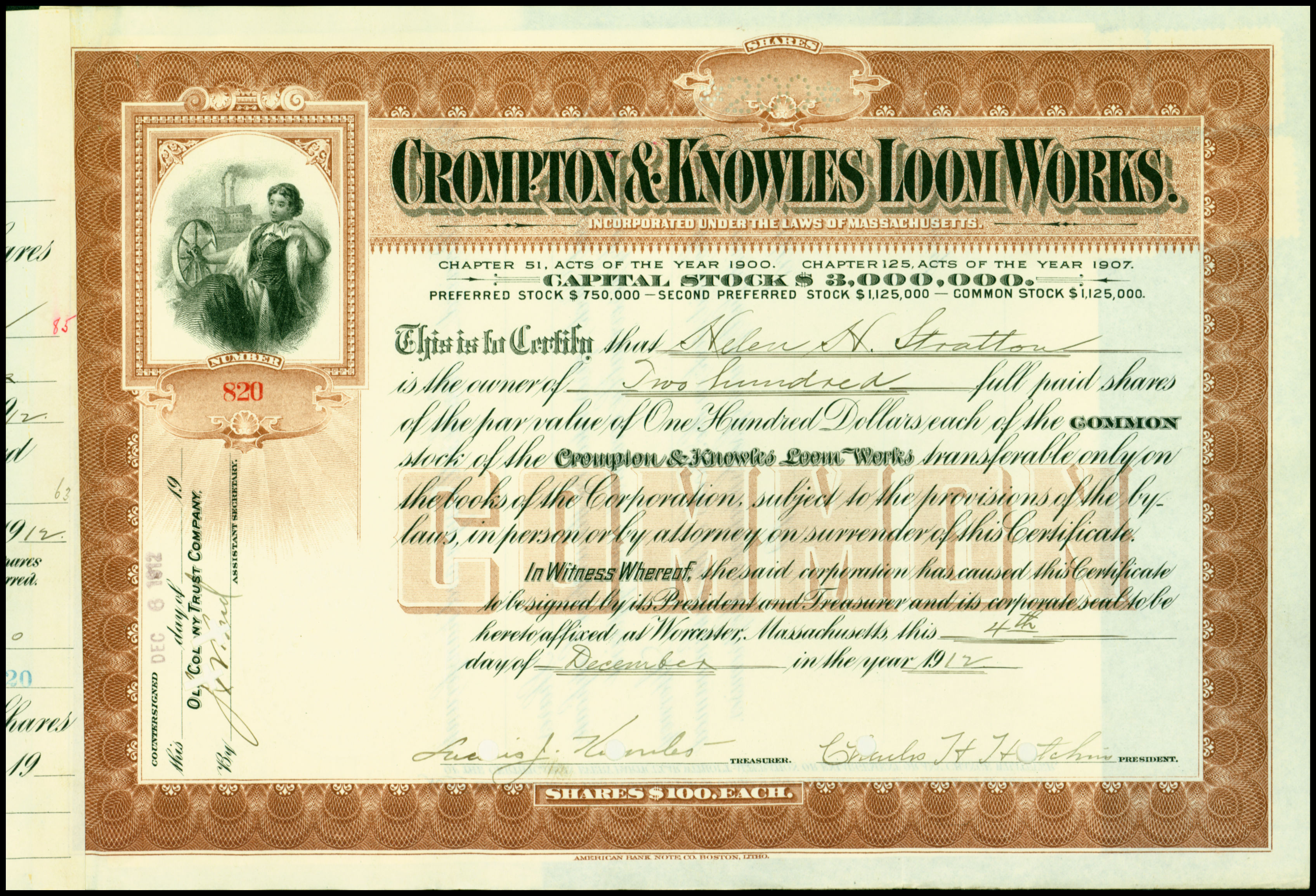
Share of the Crompton & Knowles Loom Works, issued December 4, 1912

Crompton Corporation traced its origins to 1837 when founder William Crompton invented a loom for weaving patterns in cotton, an innovation that led in the 1840s to the founding of Crompton Loom Works in Worcester, Massachusetts by his son George Crompton. The company merged in 1879 with rival Knowles Brothers to form the Crompton & Knowles Loom Works.

In 1999, Crompton & Knowles and Witco Corporation announced an intent to form C & K Witco Corporation. The merger was completed in 2000. Shortly after the merger, the name of the company was changed to Crompton Corporation.

In 2005, Crompton merged with Great Lakes Chemical Corporation of West Lafayette, Indiana, to form Chemtura, headquartered in Philadelphia.

Crompton's ticker symbol on the New York Stock Exchange was CK.

== Sources ==
- "Witco Completes Merger, Sells Oleochemicals Unit". Paint & Coatings Industry. September 20, 2000.
