= Tree Streets Historic District (Waynesboro, Virginia) =

Historic district in Virginia, United States

- U.S. National Register of Historic Places
- U.S. Historic district
- Virginia Landmarks Register
- Location within Virginia Location within the United States
- Location: Roughly bounded by Pine Ave., Eleventh St., S. Wayne Ave., 16th St., and Oak Ave., Waynesboro, Virginia
- Coordinates: 38°3′52″N 78°53′49″W
- Area: 120 acres (49 ha)
- Built: 1889
- Architectural style: Greek Revival, Queen Anne
- NRHP reference No.: 02000369
- VLR No.: 136-5049

Significant dates
- Added to NRHP: April 12, 2002
- Designated VLR: December 5, 2001

The Tree Streets Historic District is a 120-acre (49 ha) historic district in Waynesboro, Virginia. The aptly named district contains portions of Cherry, Chestnut, Locust, Maple, Oak, Pine and Walnut Avenues as well as portions of Eleventh through Sixteenth Streets and part of South Wayne Avenue. It covers the oldest residential neighborhood in Waynesboro and reflects the various stages of development of the city from the 19th century through 1951. It was listed on the National Register of Historic Places in 2002. In 2002, it included 445 buildings deemed to contribute to the historic character of the area, two contributing sites, and seven other contributing structures.

The oldest structure in the district is the Old Stone House, on Oak Avenue overlooking the South River. The age of the house is uncertain, with estimates ranging from the mid-18th century through the early 19th century. Though it has been extensively renovated at least twice, it retains the original 18-inch-thick (460 mm) fieldstone walls, chimneys at each end and some examples of original woodwork within. On the same property sometime before 1866, the neighboring Rose Cliff was erected. The two-story brick Rose Cliff was the plantation house for a large farm and orchard. In 2006, it was listed separately in the National Register of Historic Places for its architectural significance.

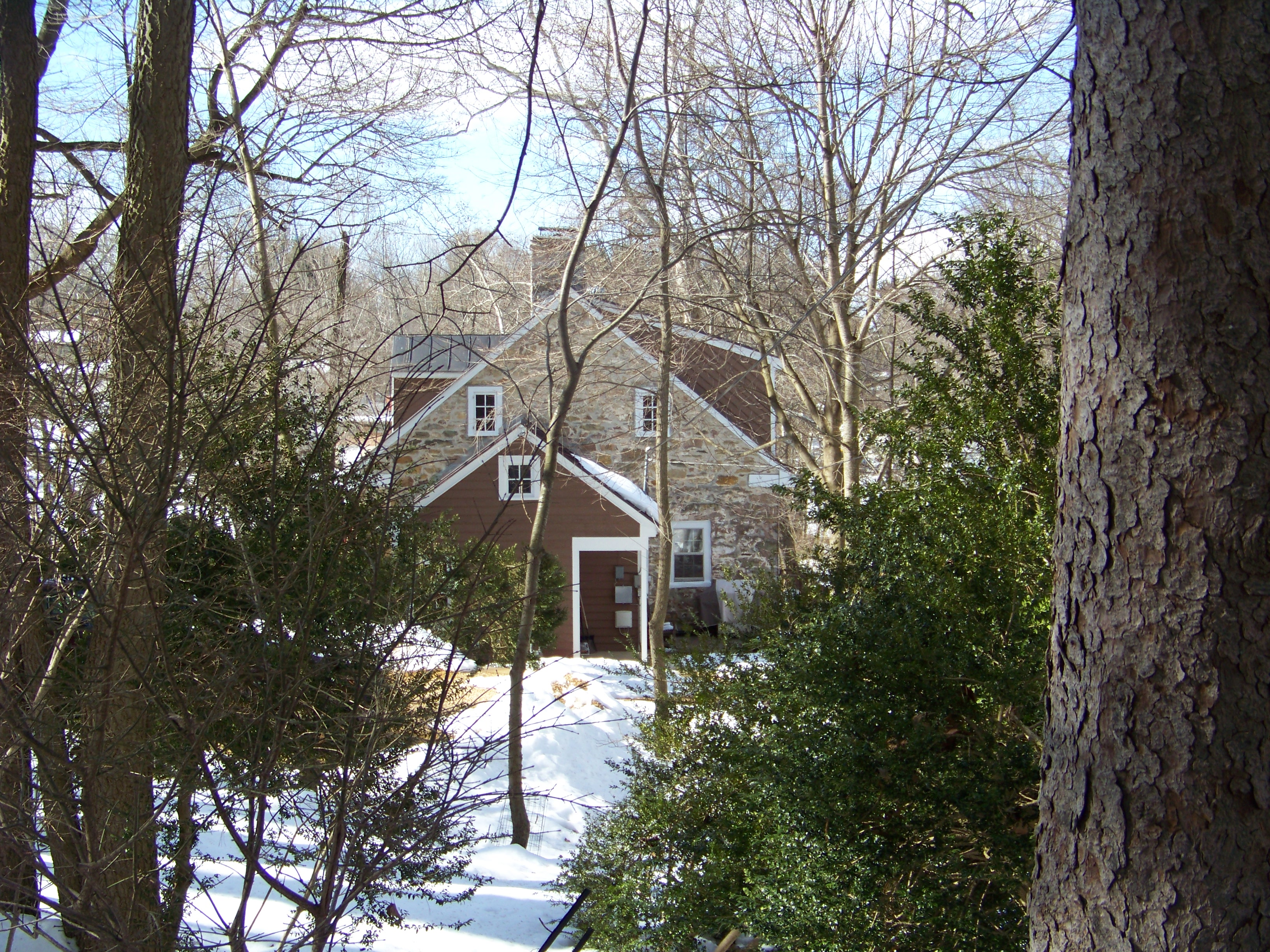
Old Stone House, the oldest structure in the Tree Streets Historic District

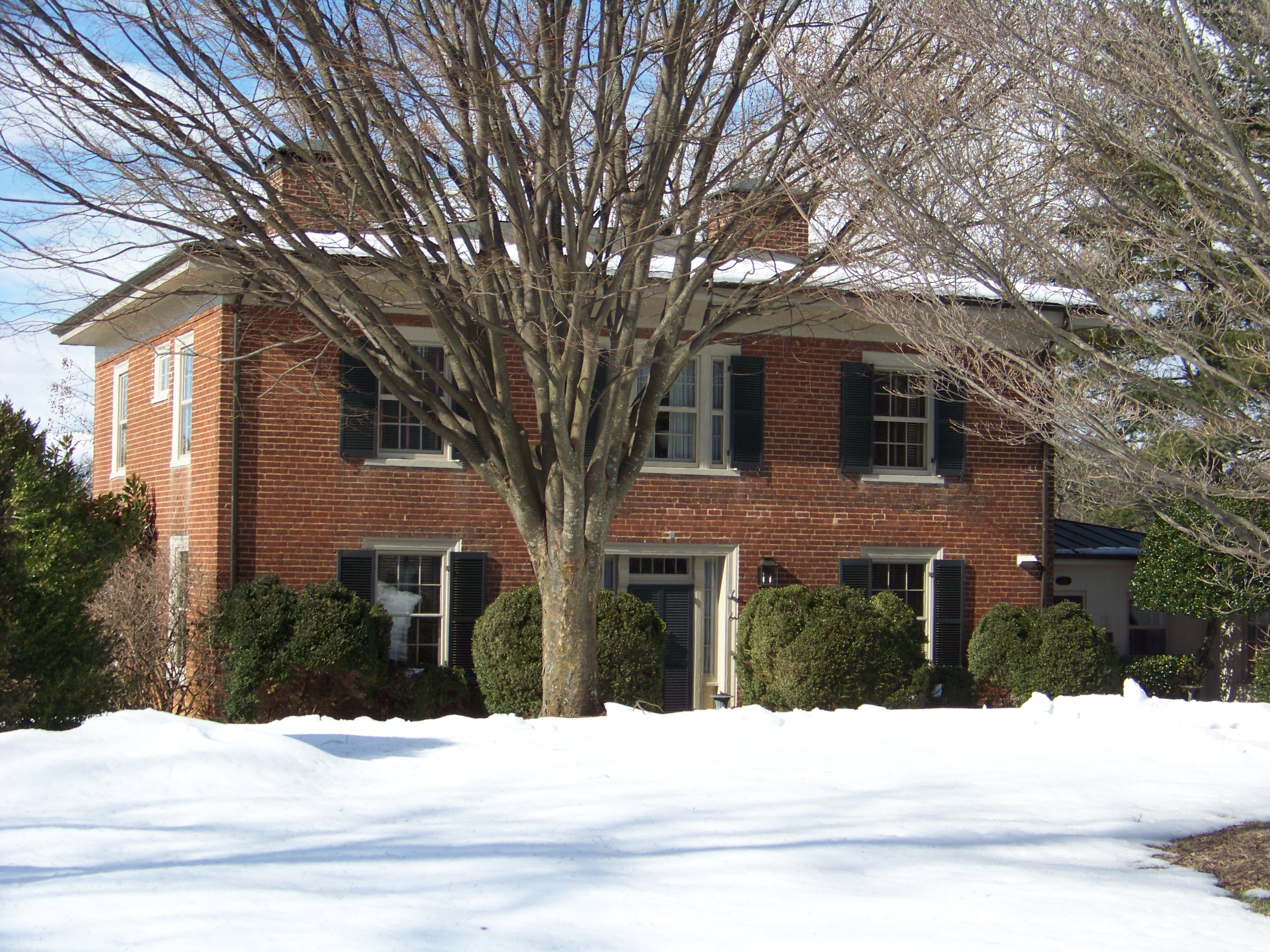
Rose Cliff with an uncharacteristic amount of snow in February 2010

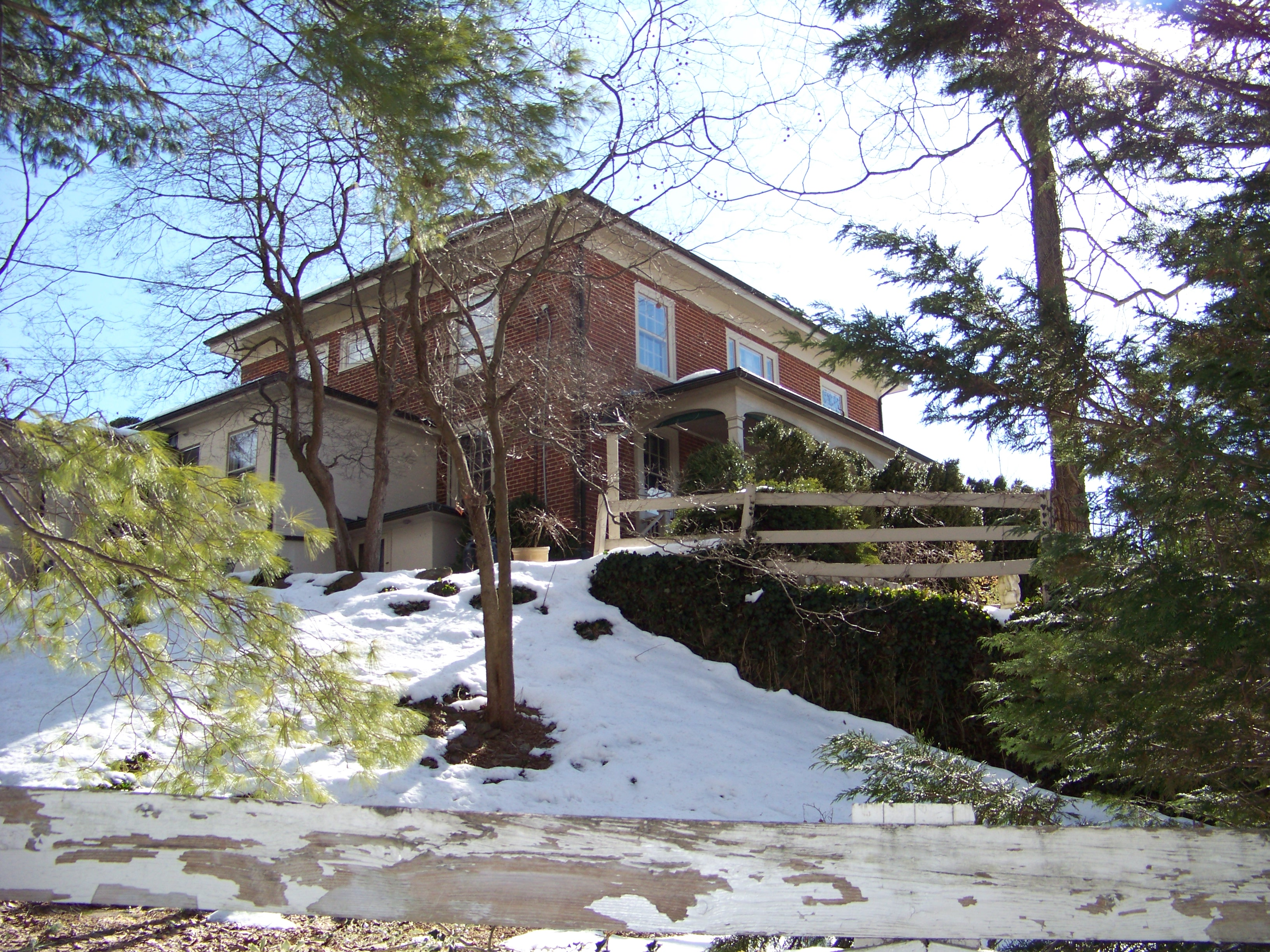
The river-facing side of Rose Cliff

About 1890, development was begun in earnest by the successful Waynesboro Company. Early development of this era included Queen Anne style residences like the W.J. Whitaker House at 517 Walnut Avenue and the Fry House at 428 Maple Avenue. The Fry House was designed by architect Carrington Hubbard, and the Whitaker House seems to be a variation of his design. Similarities between the two houses are many, including bay windows, balconies, patterned spandrels and reeded window surrounds while differences include the Fry House's octagonal turret and the Whitaker House's front door transom window. Related groupings of houses such as these were common during this period of development. Another feature indicative of development at this time is "a circular gable vent with a chrysanthemum-like piercing pattern", like the one at 353-357 Chestnut Avenue.

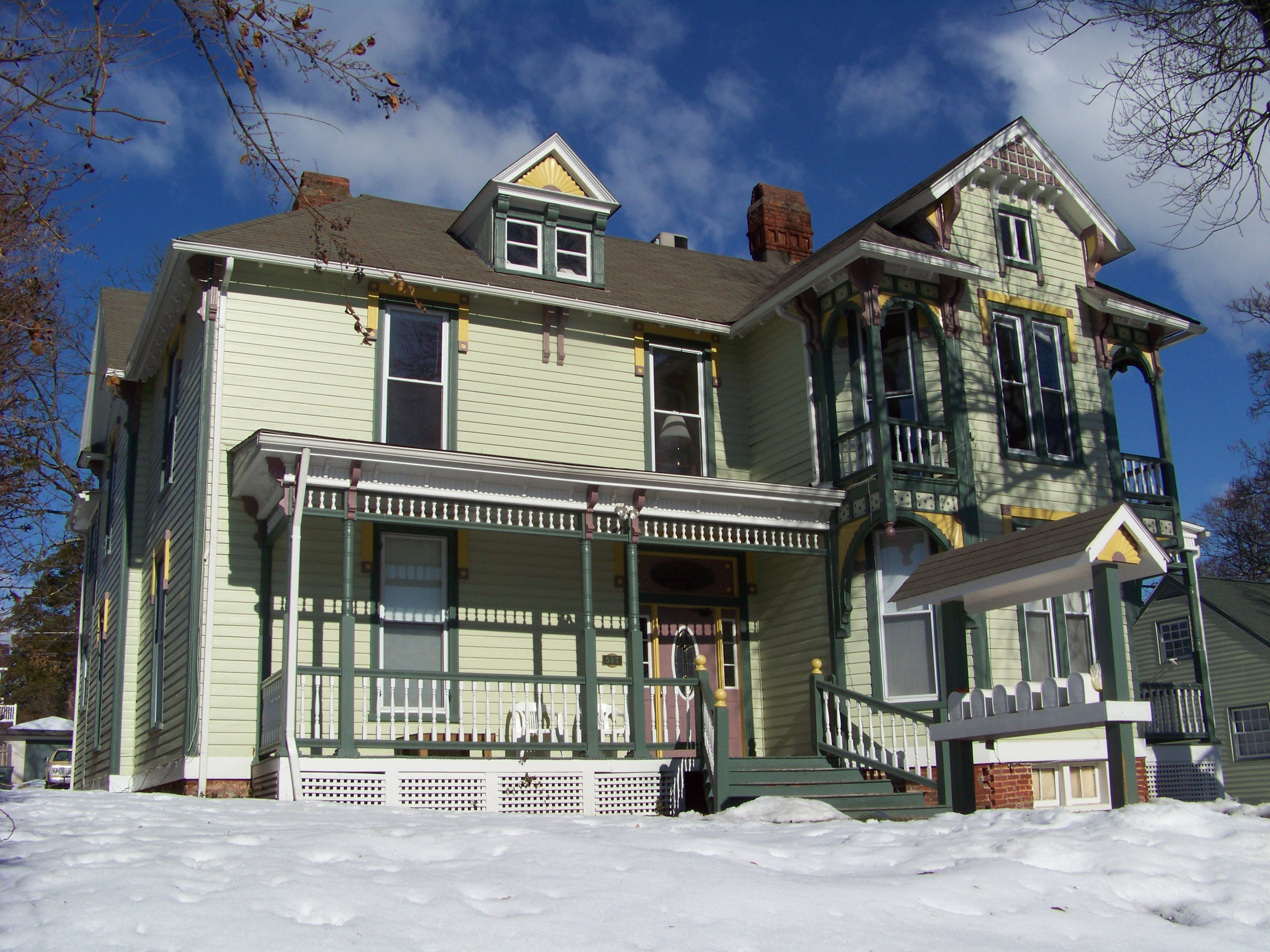
W.J. Whitaker House at 518 Walnut Avenue

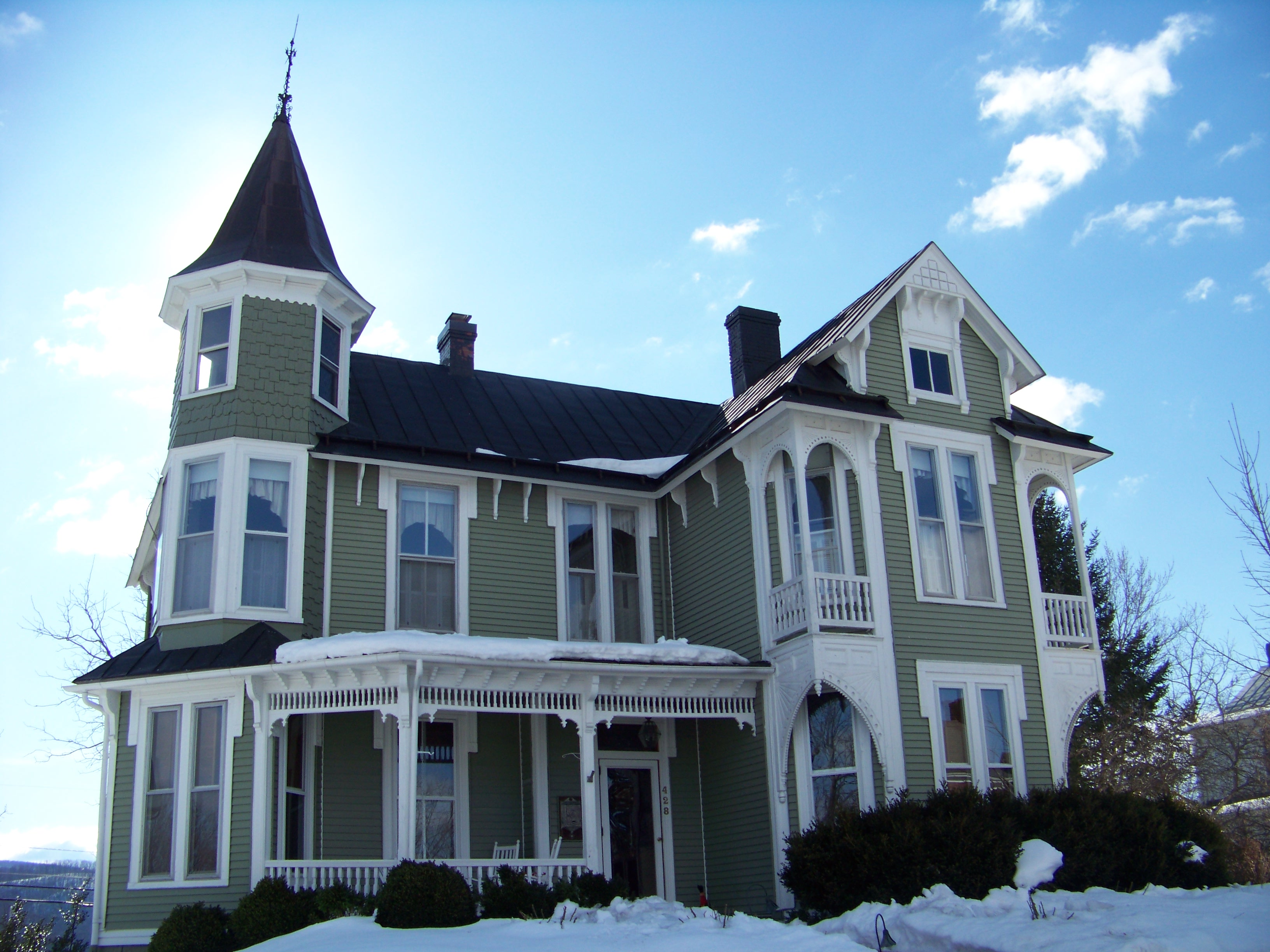
Fry House ast 428 Maple Avenue

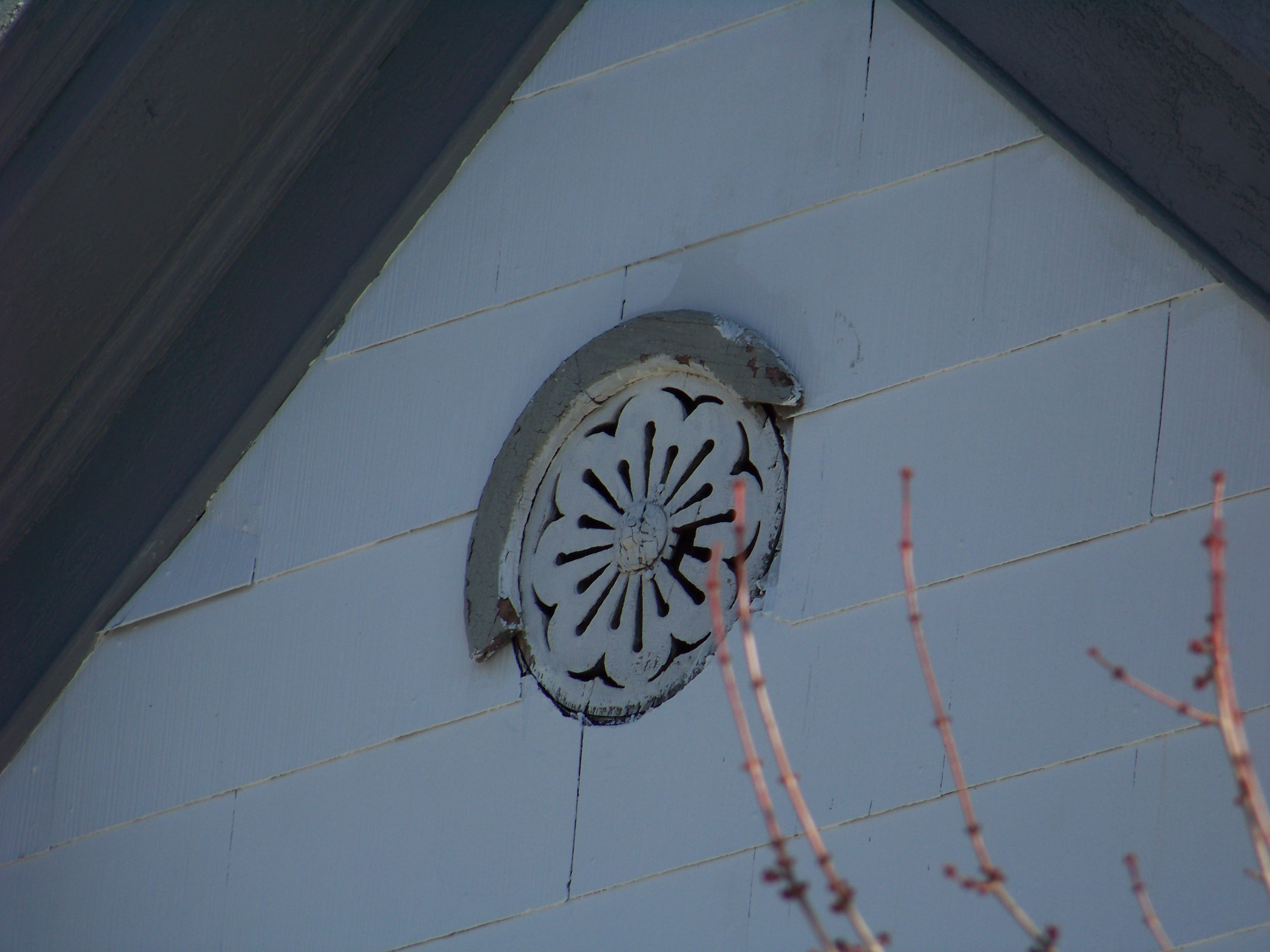
"Circular gable vent with a chrysanthemum-like piercing pattern"

== See also ==
- Port Republic Road Historic District
- Waynesboro Downtown Historic District
