= Great Lakes Chemical Corporation =

Former American chemical company

- Formerly: Great Lakes Oil and Chemical Company
- Industry: Chemical industry
- Founded: 1936 in Michigan
- Headquarters: West Lafayette, Indiana
- Owner: Chemtura
- Website: Chemtura Corporation website

Great Lakes Chemical Corporation was a chemical research, production, sales and distribution company that produced specialty chemicals used for polymers, fire suppressants and retardants, pool and spa water purification systems and various other applications. In 2005, Great Lakes merged with Crompton Corporation to become Chemtura. In 2017, Chemtura was purchased by LANXESS.

== History ==
=== 1930s-1970s ===
Great Lakes Chemical Company was founded in Michigan in 1936 to extract bromine from underground salt water brine deposits. It was acquired by McClanahan Oil in 1948 and rechristened Great Lakes Oil and Chemical Company, but by 1960 the company had moved away from oil and gas, instead focusing on the research and production of bromine-based chemicals. At about this time, the company assumed its current name (Great Lakes Chemical Corporation) and built the world's largest bromine plant in southern Arkansas.

=== 1980s-1990s ===
Great Lakes grew through the following decades, acquiring several smaller companies in its market and establishing its world headquarters in West Lafayette, Indiana. Among those acquired by Great Lakes was BioLab in 1996, a producer of pool and spa products. The ticker symbol for Great Lakes on the New York Stock Exchange was GLK.

On May 22, 1998, Great Lakes spun off their petroleum additives business as Octel Corp (NYSE:OTL).

=== 2000s ===
In July 2005, Great Lakes merged with Crompton Corporation (formerly Crompton and Knowles) to form Chemtura, which was headquartered in Philadelphia. As of 2015 the corporation employed approximately 2700 people for research, manufacturing, logistics, sales and administration. In addition, the company had significant joint ventures primarily in the United States. Net sales in 2014 were $2.2 billion. As of December 31, 2014, Chemtura's global total assets were $2.7 billion.

== Environmental impact ==
Great Lakes is the largest U.S. methyl bromide supplier in the U.S. producing more than 40 million pounds annually at their El Dorado, Arkansas plants. Great Lakes Chemical's involvement in the bromine business has its roots in leaded gasoline. When tetraethyl lead (TEL) was invented as a gasoline additive back in the 1920s, it was found to leave a corrosive byproduct in the engine. Adding ethylene dibromide (EDB) to TEL solved the problem. As leaded gasoline began to be phased out in the U.S., Great Lakes developed international markets for its products. Globalization of leaded gasoline makes TEL responsible for nearly 90 percent of airborne lead pollution in Third World cities. Some EDB in leaded gasoline converts to methyl bromide when burned. The World Meteorological Organization has determined that the continuing exhaust from automobiles using leaded gasoline is one of the three potentially major sources of atmospheric methyl bromide.

Great Lakes was a major producer of polybrominated diphenyl ethers. These compounds were marketed as flame retardants until they were banned in Europe. These persistent compounds can mimic the effect of thyroid hormones, and interfere with reproduction and nerve and tissue development.
