= Crompton Loom Works =

- U.S. National Register of Historic Places
- U.S. Historic district – Contributing property
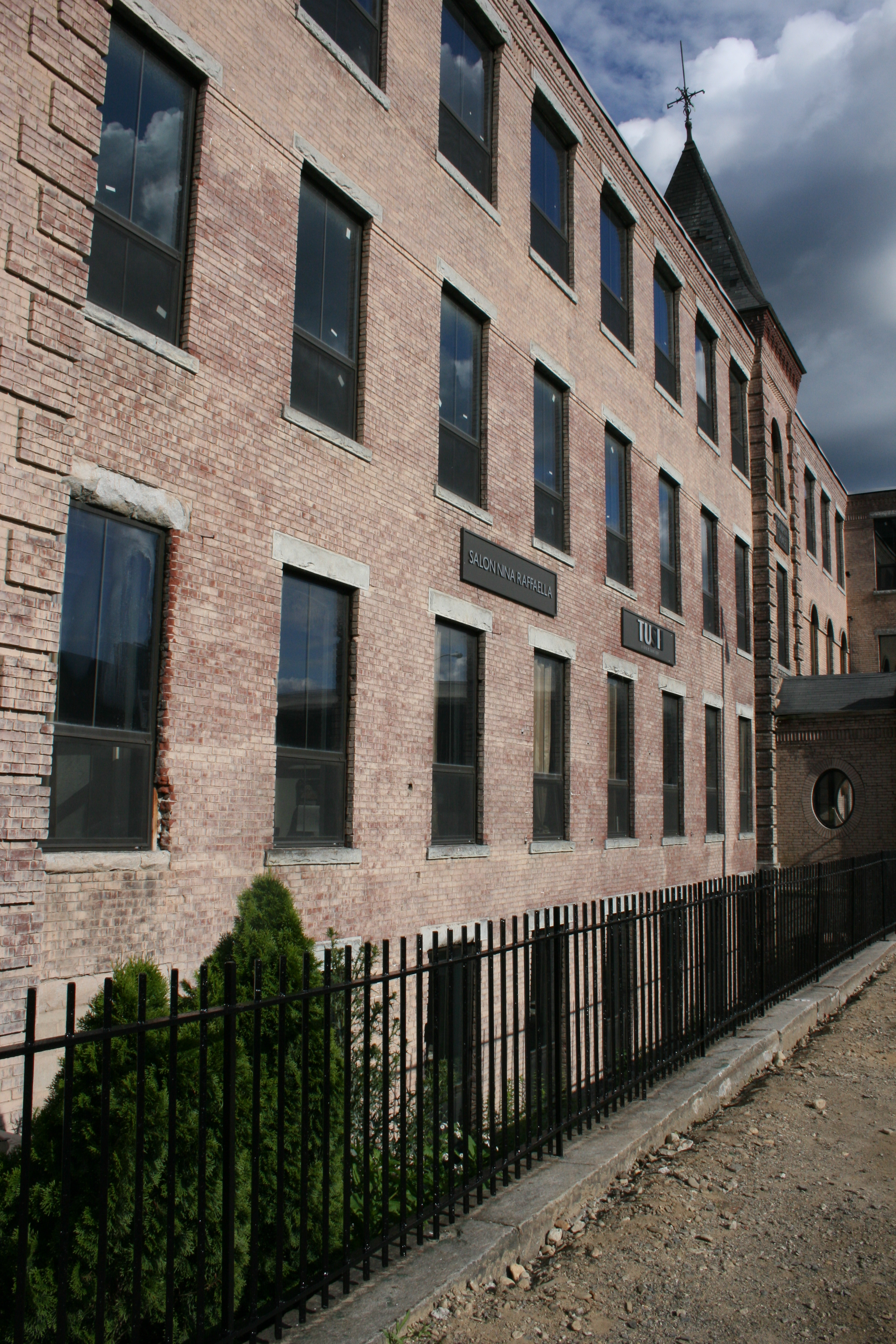

- Location within Massachusetts Location within the United States
- Location: 132-142 Green St., Worcester, Massachusetts
- Coordinates: 42°15′23″N 71°47′53″W
- Area: less than one acre
- Built: 1860
- Architectural style: Italianate
- Part of: Blackstone Canal Historic District (ID71000030)
- MPS: Worcester MRA
- NRHP reference No.: 80000541

Significant dates
- Added to NRHP: March 05, 1980
- Designated CP: August 15, 1995

The Crompton Loom Works is an historic industrial complex of the Crompton Corporation at 132-142 Green Street in Worcester, Massachusetts. The factory manufactured looms for textile factories. With its original portion dating to 1860, the complex is one of the oldest surviving industrial sites in the city. The facility was established by George Crompton, whose father William had invented the first power loom for weaving fancy fabrics. The younger Crompton's business would become of the most significant employers in the city, and his innovative looms would revolutionize the textile industry. Crompton and his successors would operate the loom manufacturing works at Green Street well into the 1960s. The manufacturing capabilities on the site were applied to producing can packaging machines and bowling pinsetters. Capabilities at the Green Street facility included machining, drop hammer forging, a cast iron foundry (which also produced ductile and malleable iron castings), wood working, and pattern making, along with a materials testing lab. The building has subsequently been adapted to other uses. The complex was listed on the National Register of Historic Places in 1980, and included as part of the Blackstone Canal Historic District in 1995.

The Crompton Loom Works is located south of downtown Worcester, at the junction Green and Harrison Streets. It is a complex of connected brick buildings, ranging in height from one to three stories. The building's style is industrial Italianate, with quoined building corners and corbelling on the eave of the main tower. Most windows are rectangular, but there are several in an older section that are set in round-arch openings. When first built, the main building was only two stories tall, and was altered several times, with the tower and third floor added in the 1880s.

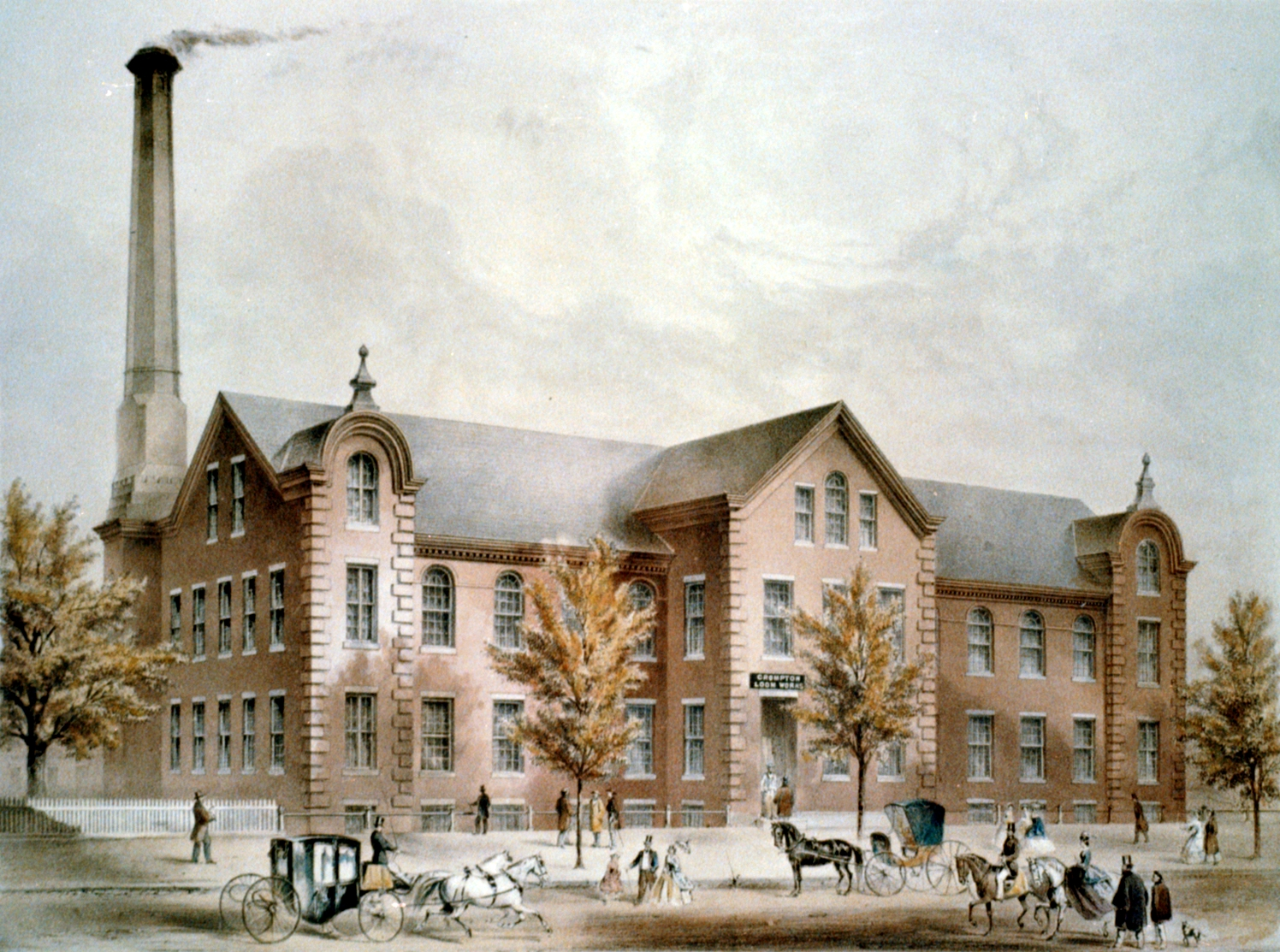
A 19th century print depicting the Crompton Loom Works

== See also ==
- Crompton Mill Historic District
- Crompton-Shenandoah Plant
- National Register of Historic Places listings in northwestern Worcester, Massachusetts
