= Lanxess =

German chemical company

Lanxess AG
- Type: Aktiengesellschaft (Public)
- Traded as: FWB: LXS; MDAX Component
- Industry: Chemicals
- Predecessor: Bayer Chemicals
- Founded: 1 July 2004; 22 years ago
- Headquarters: Cologne, Germany
- Key people: Matthias Zachert (CEO and Chairman of the Board of Management); Rolf Stomberg (Chairman of the Supervisory Board)
- Products: polymers, intermediates and specialty chemicals
- Revenue: ▼€7.2B (2018)
- Operating income: ▲€464 million (2016)
- Net income: ▲€192 million (2016)
- Number of employees: 14,000
- Website: lanxess.com

Lanxess AG is a German specialty chemicals company based in Cologne, Germany. It was founded in 2004 after Bayer AG spun off its chemicals division and parts of its polymers business.

== History ==
The company's roots trace back to 1863, with the founding of Bayer AG. In November 2003, as part of a major restructuring, the Bayer Group decided to spin off a significant portion of its chemical activities, along with approximately one-third of its polymer business, into an independent entity.

Lanxess internally established its new structure on 1 July 2004. In November 2004, at an Extraordinary General Meeting of Bayer AG in Essen, over 99 percent of the capital present voted in favor of the spin-off of Lanxess from Bayer.

Lanxess AG shares were listed on Germany’s DAX from 24 September 2012 to 21 September 2015, and are currently part of MDAX, a mid-cap index. The company is also listed on the Dow Jones Sustainability Index and FTSE4Good Index.

In 2016, the company shifted its focus to the market for additives, specifically for lubricants and fire retardants, through the acquisition of Chemtura and by placing its rubber business into a joint venture with Aramco.

In February 2020, Lanxess acquired Brazilian biocide manufacturer Itibanyl Produtos Especiais Ltda. (IPEL).

In July 2022, Lanxess finalized its acquisition of International Flavors & Fragrances' microbial control unit for US$1.3 billion.
