= Witco Corporation =

Former chemical company

- Type: Merged
- Industry: chemical
- Founded: Chicago, Illinois (1920)
- Founder: Robert Wishnick
- Defunct: 1999
- Fate: Acquired by Crompton Corporation
- Successor: Crompton Corporation
- Headquarters: New York, United States
- Area served: International
- Products: petroleum products, specialty chemicals, materials for special applications
- Number of employees: 8000

Witco Corporation (NYSE: WIT) was a manufacturer of specialty chemicals, petroleum products, and engineered materials headquartered in New York, New York. In 1999, Witco merged with Crompton & Knowles to form Crompton Corporation.

== History ==
The company, originally called Wishnick-Tumpeer Chemical Company, was incorporated on May 6, 1920, in Chicago by Robert Wishnick, a son of a Russian Jewish immigrant, and his two friends, brothers David and Julius Tumpeer. The company would purchase in bulk various chemicals, primarily carbon black and coloring agents used in the printing industry, throughout the Midwest, and resell them in smaller batches in Chicago. Wishnick held the majority (51%) ownership in the company, the two Tumpeer brothers held 10% each, and the rest was split among several smaller investors.

Within the first year of existence, the company faced the Depression of 1920–1921, resulting in decreased sales, and was forced to cut costs wherever possible, including Wishnick's own salary, reduce profit margins, lay off their already minimal staff, and work on increasing the sales volume. The measures were successful and the company even managed to turn a profit after one year. In 1922, the company acquired 20% interest in a carbon black manufacturing plant in Swartz, Louisiana and started to market their product on the commission basis. By 1923, the company expanded further and opened an office in New York, which Julius Tumpeer would head. However, within a short time Tumpeer got homesick and asked to return to the Chicago area, with Wishnick replacing him in New York.

In 1924, noticing the ever increasing sales of asphalts to the rubber industry, the company purchased the first manufacturing facility of their own, Pioneer Asphalt Company in Lawrenceville, Illinois. By 1926, asphalt products constituted so much of the company's business, that the Board made a decision to shorten the name of the company to Wishnick-Tumpeer Incorporated. The business continued to boom throughout the rest of the 1920s, until 1929, when the company was faced with another challenge—the Great Depression.

The company turned back to the cost-cutting measures—the same strategy that worked in 1920. This worked well, and the company was turning a profit each year throughout the 1930s, despite consistently facing cash flow issues. Despite the challenges, the period saw significant growth of demand for carbon black. In 1933, the company acquired a carbon black manufacturing plant in Texas and, together with Continental Oil Company and the Shamrock Oil & Gas Corporation, formed Continental Carbon Company, for which the partner companies supplied natural gas to use as the raw material in production of carbon black, for which Wishnick-Tumpeer in turn became the sole sales agent. 1935 saw the Wishnick-Tumpeer’s expansion overseas, when first an interest was acquired in Harold A. Wilson & Company, a UK supplier of pigments to the United States. The whole company was acquired shortly after. In 1939, Wishnick-Tumpeer built its first true chemical manufacturing plant in Chicago, which produced industrial chemicals and asphaltic products.

The beginning of World War II meant increased business for Wishnick-Tumpeer as chemicals were vital in the war effort. However, much of company's business was still in distribution, and with increased shortages and rationing, the company's suppliers were not always able to deliver. In 1944, the name of the company was changed to Witco Chemical Company, derived from the initials of the two founding families. By the end of the war, while company's annual sales reached a record $7.8 million, it was nevertheless facing new challenges, as many of its suppliers preferred to use their own sales forces instead of relying on distributors such as Witco. As a result, in 1945 Witco's Board made a decision to move away from distribution and focus on its own manufacturing.

The first step in that direction was the expansion of the Chicago plant, which expanded its product line to manufacture metallic stearates. Shortly after, the Franks Chemical Products Company in Brooklyn, also a producer of stearates, was acquired and then moved to Perth Amboy, New Jersey to reduce costs. In 1953, Witco acquired a plant from the India Paint & Varnish Division of American Marietta in Los Angeles and retooled it to produce metallic stearates and driers. In 1954, sales reached a $19.9 million mark, and a compounded synthetic and natural rubber manufacturing facility was acquired in England.

This time of growth was not without its difficulties, however. The Perth Amboy plant had recurring operating problems. In 1952, there was a major fire at the Chicago plant; also that year, the first strike in company's history took place in the Lawrenceville plant where workers demanded a pay increase. Nevertheless, the company was committed to pursuing the manufacturing course, and by 1955 exited the distributing business altogether; a decision influenced in no small part by the Korean War and the resurgence of rationing and shortages it brought. Additionally, with Julius Trumpeer retiring in 1947 and his brother David dying in 1951, a major management reorganization was long overdue. In 1955, Robert Wishnick became the chairman of the board, and Max Minning, a long-time employee, replaced him as company's president. William Wishnick, Robert's son who joined the company back in 1938 as an office clerk and warehouse worker and gradually worked his way to the top, filled the executive vice-president position.

The first major acquisition after the reorganization was the purchase of the chemical division of Emulsol Chemical Corporation in Chicago, which produced emulsifiers and surface-acting agents used as raw materials in production of chemicals, drugs, cosmetics, and agricultural products. The new facility became the base of Witco's organic chemicals division and was a large step towards diversifying their existing product base, which to date had still comprised mostly asphaltic products and a few specialty chemicals. Also in 1955, a 50% interest was acquired in Ultra Chemical Works in Paterson, New Jersey, a major producer of detergent chemicals, detergents, and surfactants. The remaining 50% were acquired the following year. The company also purchased land in Canada in preparations for building a new plant there. By 1957, the sales volume grew to $40 million.

The company went public in 1958, issuing 150,000 shares of common stock, and continued to grow. Not all initiatives were a success, however. A phthalic anhydride plant Witco constructed in Chicago in 1958, and followed by another plant in Perth Amboy in 1960, for example, were using an obsolete technology and ultimately could not compete with more efficient offerings by other manufacturers and had to be closed shortly thereafter. The failure reinforced the company's commitment to focusing on specialty, rather than commodity, chemicals.

The next acquisition happened in 1960, with the purchase of Sonneborn Chemical and Refining Company (Rudolf Goldschmid Sonneborn (1898 – 1986) ), at the time a leading manufacturer of petroleum-derived products. The acquisition also brought a number of people into executive management, who would play major roles in Witco's subsequent growth, and boosted the sales volume to $100 million mark. Shortly after, Witco formed a joint venture with Richfield Oil Company in California to produce raw materials for detergents, and with the United States Rubber Company in England. Investments were made into various other ventures, including in Argentina. 1963 saw the acquisition of Golden Bear Oil Company in California, as well as a number of detergent companies in Canada, Belgium, and France.

1964 was another big year for reorganizations. Robert Wishnick stepped down as the chairman of the board and took the position of the chairman of the finance and executive committees; the position of the board chairman was taken by his son William. Max Minning continued to serve as the president, but was also designated the CEO of the company. By this time, company's sales volume reached $135 million, with the product line including 219 products.

William Wishnick's appointment as the chairman of the board marked the beginning of a new era of expansion. Three new acquisitions were made in 1966 alone, making it the peak year for acquisitions in the entire company's history. First was the Argus Chemical Corporation in Brooklyn, a plastics industry manufacturer of stabilizers and plasticizers. It was followed by the acquisition of the Kendall Refining Company, a producer of specialty petroleum products. The final acquisition of 1966 was of the remainder of Witfield Chemical, makers of biodegradable detergent raw materials, who were the result of an earlier merger of Richfield Oil with the Atlantic Refining Company. At the same time, much attention was paid to modernizing the plants and investing in research and development. In 1967, a new epoxy plasticizer plant was built in Louisiana. The sales volume reached a $195 million mark in 1966 and continued to grow; increasing by 250% in the next ten years.

The name of the company was changed to Witco Chemical Corporation in 1968. In 1969, Witco started a company to produce detergents in Israel; by the 1970s it grew to become the largest detergent operation in that country. 1970 was marked by a fire at the Franklin, Pennsylvania refinery; the facility had to be closed as a result, but at the same time the refinery operations in Bradford was expanded. In 1971, Max Minning resigned as president, and William Wishnick became the chairman, the president, and the CEO of the company. In 1973, a polybutylene plant was constructed in Taft, Louisiana.

The 1973–1975 recession brought the expansion to a halt, with both the sales volume and earning seeing a sharp drop. Also, in 1974, the expiration of Witco's 1933 agreement with the Continental Carbon Company marked a point where Witco completely exited the reselling business and concentrated solely on manufacturing and distribution of its own products.

Things returned more or less to normal in 1975, but the recession did leave a mark. The overall operating earnings were down by almost a quarter, compared to pre-recession years. Nevertheless, Witco resumed its expansion initiatives, albeit at a slower pace than in the past. In 1975, Waverly Oil Work, a small-scale crude oil producer operating in Pennsylvania, Ohio, and West Virginia, was acquired, and the construction of a hydrogenation unit in Petrolia, Pennsylvania started. Another reorganization saw Henry Sonneborn succeeding William Wishnick in the role of president, and Robert Wishnick designated as chairman emeritus of the company, a position he would hold until his death in 1980.

The pace of acquisitions slowed down considerably from 1975 onward. By 1985, the major focus of the company was modernization of existing facilities, rather than acquiring or constructing new ones. In 1985, the company changed its name one last time, becoming Witco Incorporated. By then petroleum products overtook specialty chemicals as the bulk of company's business, with materials engineered for special applications accounting for only 6% of all output. Henry Sonneborn retired, and the position of the president and passed onto William J. Ashe, who was in turn replaced by Thomas J. Bickett, a member of the board of directors, in 1986. William Wishnick gradually disinvolved himself from direct management duties, but still retained 7.5% of the company's shares by the late 1980s. By 1988, the company employed over 8,000 employees and had the sales volume of $1.35 billion.

In 1999, Witco and Crompton & Knowles announced an intent to form C & K Witco Corporation. The merger was completed in 2000. Shortly after the merger, the name of the company was changed to Crompton Corporation.

== Sources ==
- Wishnick, William (1976). The Witco Story. The Newcomen Society of North America.
- Derdak, Thomas, ed. (1988). International Directory of Company Histories. Vol. 1. Chicago and London: St. James Press.
- Mt. Vernon Register-News. Strike Idles 600 at Lawernceville by Associated Press. Vol. XXXII, No. 221, June 16, 1952, p. 1.
- "Witco Completes Merger, Sells Oleochemicals Unit". Paint & Coatings Industry. September 20, 2000.
