= William Crompton (inventor) =

American inventor (1806–1891)

William Crompton (10 September 1806 in Preston, England – 1 May 1891 in Windsor, Connecticut) was an American inventor in the field of loom technology.

Crompton was brought up as a hand loom cotton weaver and, at an early age, learned the trade of a machinist. While superintendent of a cotton mill in Ramsbottom he made many experiments on cotton looms. He went to Taunton, Massachusetts, in 1836 and devised a loom for the manufacture of fancy cotton goods, receiving a patent on 23 November 1837 (U.S. Patent 491). In this loom one part of the warp was depressed while the other was lifted, instead of allowing one part to remain stationary, thus securing more room for the passage of the shuttle. Another feature of it was an endless loop pattern chain, which, with its peculiar apparatus, operated the warp. This allowed many more pattern sequences and made them much easier to change.

Crompton went back to England in 1838 and, after patenting his loom there, returned with his family to America in 1839. In 1840, he adapted his loom to the weaving of fancy woolens for Middlesex Mills in Lowell, Massachusetts, where he worked for two years. Late in his career, he divided his time between manufacturing cotton and woolen goods in Millbury, Massachusetts, and touring New England teaching operators how to use his looms.

Crompton retired from active business in 1849, on account of failing health. His son, George Crompton, continued improving the loom. In 1900, at least three fourths of all the woolen goods made in the United States were woven on the Crompton loom, or on looms embodying its principles.
