= Episcopal Church (United States) =

Anglican denomination

The Episcopal Church
- Arms of The Episcopal Church: Argent a cross throughout gules, on a canton azure nine cross crosslets in saltire of the field.
- Classification: Protestant
- Orientation: Anglican (Note: Broad church (including variations of high church and low church))
- Scripture: Protestant Bible
- Theology: Anglican doctrine (Note: With various theological and doctrinal identities, including Anglo-Catholic, Liberal and Evangelical)
- Polity: Episcopal
- Governance: Unitary (Note: General Convention of the Episcopal Church in the United States of America.)
- Presiding bishop: Sean W. Rowe
- President of the House of Deputies: Julia Ayala Harris
- Chief of Mission: Lester V. Mackenzie
- Communion: Anglican Communion
- Provinces: 9
- Dioceses: 106
- Parishes: 6,707 (2024)
- Associations: National Council of Churches; World Council of Churches; Christian Churches Together
- Full communion: Churches in the Anglican Communion (Note: Including the CoE, ACC and other Anglican provinces.) (since Treaty of Paris, 1783) (Note: Reaffirmed at the first Lambeth Conference, in 1867, during the primacy of John Henry Hopkins.); Union of Utrecht (since 1931) (Note: Via the Bonn Agreement, as a province of the Anglican Communion.); Philippine Independent Church (since 1961); Mar Thoma Syrian Church (since 1974) (Note: As a province of the Anglican Communion, and through its own concordats.); ELCA (since 1999); Moravians (since 2010); CoS (since 2023); ELCIC (since 2018); ELKB (since 2025)
- Region: United States (Note: Further dioceses in Cuba, Haiti, Taiwan, Latin America and the Caribbean, Europe)
- Language: English (Note: Spanish, and French (both metropolitan and Canadian) as major spoken languages but parishes are open to use the language they please.)
- Liturgy: 1979 Book of Common Prayer
- Headquarters: 815 Second Avenue; New York City, New York; U.S.
- Territory: United States, Taiwan, Cuba, Honduras, Ecuador, Venezuela, Europe (partially)
- Origin: 1785; 241 years ago
- Branched from: Church of England
- Absorbed: PECSA (1865); Church of Hawaii (1898)
- Separations: PECSA (1861); REC (1873); SEP (1953); OAC (1964); ACC (1977); APCK (1977); EMC (1992); AMiA (2000); ACNA (2009); Personal Ordinariate of the Chair of Saint Peter (2012)
- Members: 1,425,065 active baptized members (2025); 1,394,769 active baptized members in the U.S. (2023)
- Aid organization: Episcopal Relief and Development
- Official website: www.episcopalchurch.org
- The Archives of the Episcopal Church: www.episcopalarchives.org
- Slogan: "The Episcopal Church Welcomes You"

The Episcopal Church (TEC), also known as the Protestant Episcopal Church in the United States of America (PECUSA), is a member of the worldwide Anglican Communion, based in the United States. It is a Mainline Protestant denomination and divided into nine provinces. The presiding bishop of the Episcopal Church is Sean W. Rowe.

In 2024, The Church of England Yearbook reported a total of 2.4 million members. In 2025 the Episcopal Church was the 9th-largest Protestant denomination in the US, as measured by adherents. A total of 1% of US adults, or approximately 2.7 million people, self-identify as mainline Episcopalians/Anglicans. In 2025, the church reported approximately 1.4 million active baptized members. Membership and Sunday attendance have declined sharply since the 1960s, particularly in the Northeast and Upper Midwest.

The church was organized after the American Revolution, when it separated from the Church of England, whose clergy are required to swear allegiance to the British monarch as Supreme Governor of the Church of England. The Episcopal Church describes itself as "Protestant, yet Catholic", and asserts it has apostolic succession, tracing the authority of its bishops to the apostles via holy orders. The Book of Common Prayer, a collection of rites, blessings, liturgies, and prayers used throughout the Anglican Communion, is central to Episcopal worship. A wide range of theological views is represented within the Episcopal Church, including evangelical, Anglo-Catholic, and broad church views.

Historically, members of the Episcopal Church have played leadership roles in many aspects of American life, including politics, business, science, the arts, and education. About three-quarters of the signers of the US Declaration of Independence were affiliated with the Episcopal Church, and over a quarter of all presidents of the United States have been Episcopalians. Historically, Episcopalians were overrepresented among American scientific elite and Nobel Prize winners. Numbers of the most wealthy and affluent American families, such as the Four Hundred, Boston Brahmin, Old Philadelphians, the First Families of Virginia, Tidewater, and Lowcountry gentry or old money, are Episcopalians. In the late 19th and early 20th centuries, many Episcopalians were active in the Social Gospel movement.

Since the 1960s and 1970s, the church has pursued a more liberal Christian course; there remains a wide spectrum of liberals and conservatives within the church. In 2015, the church's 78th triennial General Convention passed resolutions allowing the blessing of same-sex marriages and approved two official liturgies to bless such unions. It has opposed the death penalty and supported the civil rights movement. The church calls for the full legal equality of LGBT people and affirms access to abortion with no restrictions. In view of this trend, the conventions of four dioceses of the Episcopal Church voted in 2007 and 2008 to leave that church and to join the Anglican Church of the Southern Cone of America. Twelve other jurisdictions, serving an estimated 100,000 persons at that time, formed the Anglican Church in North America (ACNA) in 2008. The ACNA and the Episcopal Church are not in full communion with one another.

== Names ==
Flag of the Episcopal Church

The "Protestant Episcopal Church in the United States of America" (PECUSA) and "the Episcopal Church" (TEC) are both official names specified in the church's constitution. The latter is much more commonly used. In other languages, an equivalent is used. For example, in Spanish, the church is called Iglesia Episcopal Protestante de los Estados Unidos de América or Iglesia Episcopal, and in French Église protestante épiscopale des États-Unis d'Amérique or Église épiscopale.

Until 1964, "the Protestant Episcopal Church in the United States of America" was the only official name in use. In the 19th century, high church members advocated changing the name, which they felt did not acknowledge the church's catholic heritage. They were opposed by the church's evangelical wing, which felt that the "Protestant Episcopal" label accurately reflected the Reformed character of Anglicanism. After 1877, alternative names were regularly proposed and rejected by the General Convention. One proposed alternative was "the American Catholic Church". Respondents to a 1961 poll in The Living Church favored "The American Episcopal Church". By the 1960s, opposition to dropping the word "Protestant" had largely subsided. In a 1964 General Convention compromise, priests and lay delegates suggested adding a preamble to the church's constitution, recognizing "the Episcopal Church" as a lawful alternate designation while still retaining the earlier name.

The 66th General Convention voted in 1979 to use the name "the Episcopal Church" in the Oath of Conformity of the Declaration for Ordination. The evolution of the name can be seen in the church's Book of Common Prayer. In the 1928 BCP, the title page read, "According to the use of The Protestant Episcopal Church in the United States of America", whereas on the title page of the 1979 BCP it states, "According to the use of The Episcopal Church".

"The Episcopal Church in the United States of America" (ECUSA) has never been an official name of the church but is an alternative commonly seen in English. Since several other churches in the Anglican Communion also use the name "Episcopal", including Scotland and the Philippines, some, for example the Anglicans Online directory, add the phrase "in the United States of America".

The full legal name of the national church corporate body is the "Domestic and Foreign Missionary Society of the Protestant Episcopal Church in the United States of America", which was incorporated by the legislature of New York and established in 1821. The membership of the corporation "shall be considered as comprehending all persons who are members of the Church". This should not be confused with the name of the church itself, as it is a distinct body relating to church governance.

According to TEC's style guide, "Episcopal" is the adjective that should be used to describe something affiliated with the church, whereas "Episcopalian" is to be used "only as a noun referring to a member of the Episcopal Church."

== History ==
=== Colonial era ===
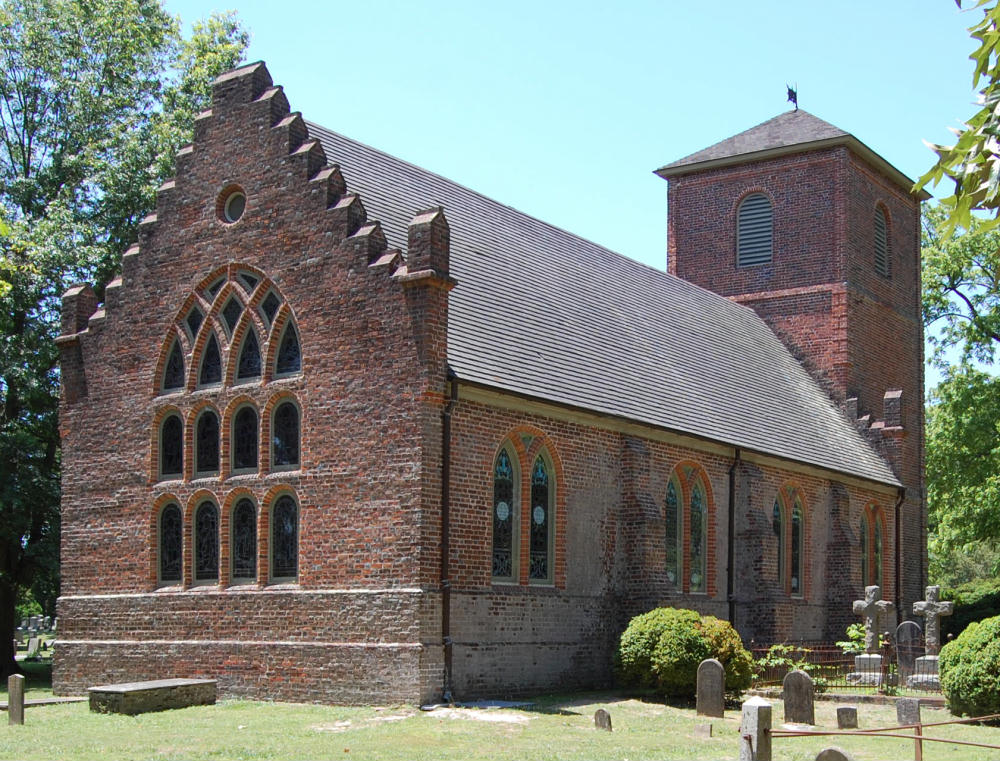
St. Luke's Church, built during the 17th century near Smithfield, Virginia – the oldest Anglican church-building to have survived largely intact in North America

The Episcopal Church has its origins in the Church of England in the American colonies, and it stresses continuity with the early universal Western Church and claims to maintain apostolic succession; while the Scandinavian Lutheran and Moravian churches accept this claim, the Catholic and Eastern Orthodox churches do not recognize this claim.

The first parish was founded in Jamestown, Virginia, in 1607, under the charter of the Virginia Company of London. The tower of Jamestown Church (c. 1639–1643) is one of the oldest surviving Anglican church structures in the United States. The Jamestown church building itself is a modern reconstruction.

Although no American Anglican bishops existed in the colonial era, the Church of England had an official status in several colonies, which meant that local governments paid tax money to local parishes, and the parishes handled some civic functions. The Church of England was designated the established church in Virginia in 1609, in New York in 1693, in Maryland in 1702, in South Carolina in 1706, in North Carolina in 1730, and in Georgia in 1758.

From 1635 the vestries and the clergy came loosely under the diocesan authority of the Bishop of London. After 1702, the Society for the Propagation of the Gospel in Foreign Parts (SPG) began missionary activity throughout the colonies. On the eve of American Revolution about 400 independent congregations were reported throughout the colonies.

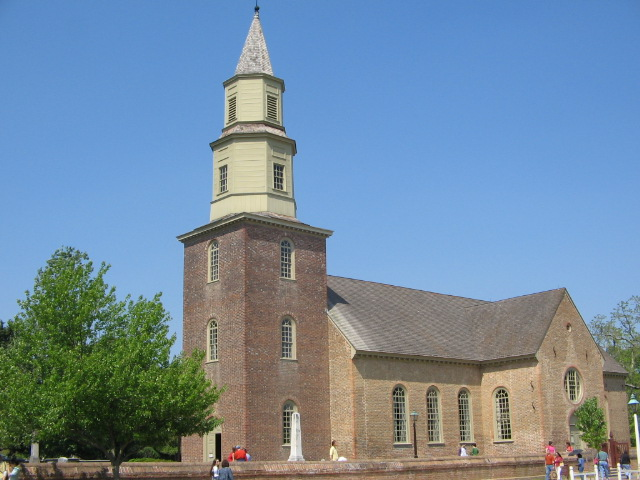
Bruton Parish Church in Colonial Williamsburg, established in 1674. The current building was completed in 1715.

Under the leadership of Lutheran bishop Jesper Swedberg, parishes in colonial America that belonged to the Evangelical Lutheran Church of Sweden established ecumenical dialogue that resulted in altar and pulpit fellowship with the Episcopal Church in the 1700s, which led to a merger of many of the Swedish Lutheran churches there into the Episcopal Church by 1846. A number of Swedes later would establish the Augustana Evangelical Lutheran Church (a forerunner for the present-day Evangelical Lutheran Church in America and North American Lutheran Church).

=== Revolutionary era ===
More than any other denomination, the American Revolutionary War internally divided both clergy and laity of the Church of England in America, and opinions covered a wide spectrum of political views: patriots, conciliators, and loyalists. While many Patriots were suspicious of Loyalism in the church, about three-quarters of the signers of the Declaration of Independence were nominally Anglican laymen, including Thomas Jefferson, William Paca, and George Wythe. It was often assumed that persons considered "High Church" were Loyalists, whereas persons considered "Low Church" were Patriots: assumptions with possibly dangerous implications for the time.

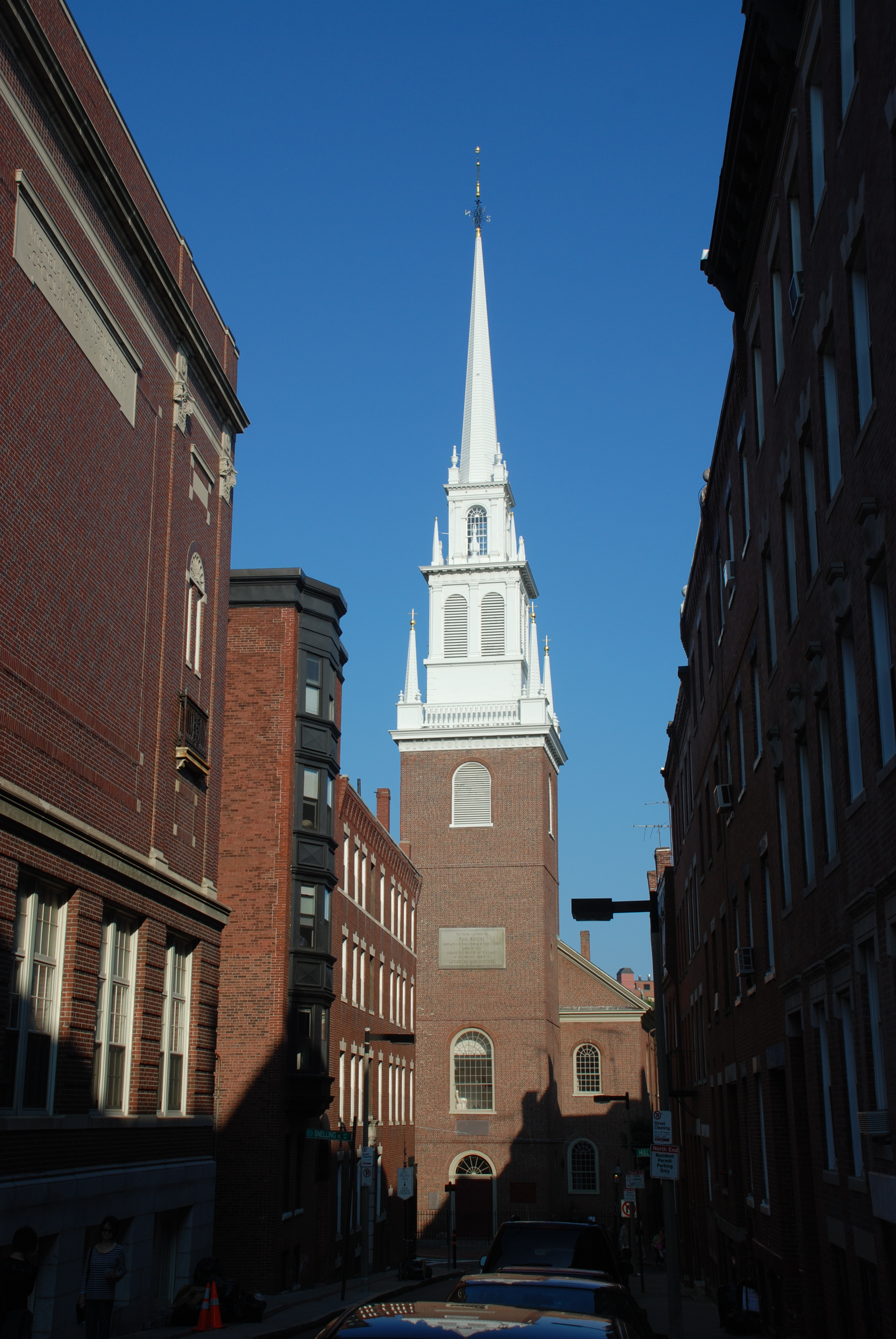
Old North Church in Boston. Inspired by the work of Christopher Wren, it was completed in 1723.

Of the approximately three hundred clergy in the Church of England in America between 1776 and 1783, over 80 percent in New England, New York, and New Jersey were loyalists. This is in contrast to the less than 23 percent loyalist clergy in the four southern colonies. Many Church of England clergy remained loyalists as they took their two ordination oaths very seriously. Anglican clergy were obliged to swear allegiance to the king as well as to pray for the king, the royal family, and the British Parliament. In general, loyalist clergy stayed by their oaths and prayed for the king or else suspended services. By the end of 1776, some Anglican churches were closing. Anglican priests held services in private homes or lay readers who were not bound by the oaths held morning and evening prayer. During 1775 and 1776, the Continental Congress issued decrees ordering churches to fast and pray on behalf of the Patriots. Starting July 4, 1776, Congress and several states passed laws making prayers for the king and British Parliament acts of treason. The patriot clergy in the South were quick to find reasons to transfer their oaths to the American cause and prayed for the success of the Revolution. One precedent was the transfer of oaths during the Glorious Revolution in England. Most of the patriot clergy in the South were able to keep their churches open and services continued.

=== Early Republic era ===
In the wake of the Revolution, American Episcopalians faced the task of preserving a hierarchical church structure in a society infused with republican values.

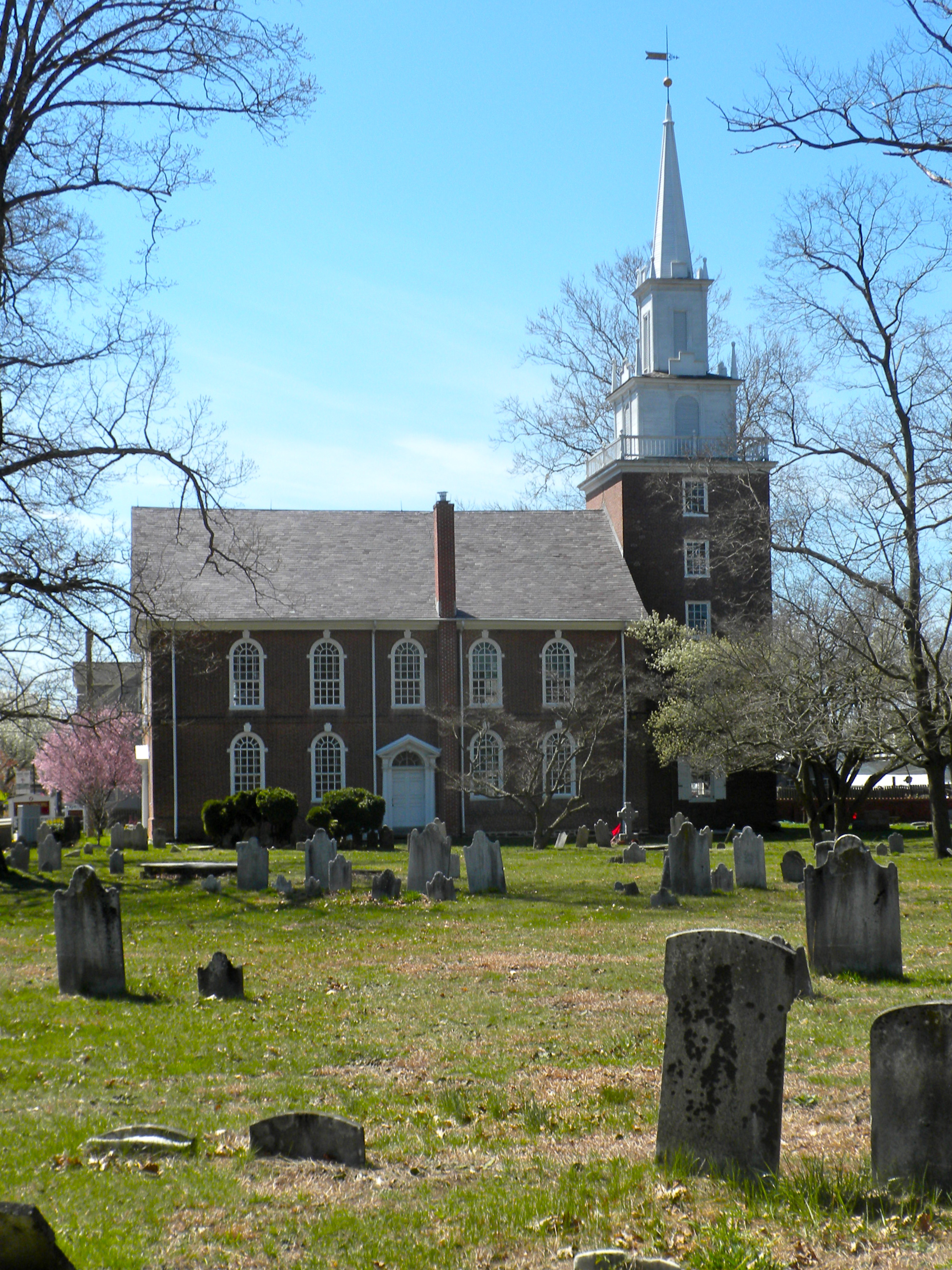
Trinity Church in Swedesboro, New Jersey. Originally serving a Church of Sweden congregation, it became an Episcopal church in 1786, when this building was completed.

When the clergy of Connecticut elected Samuel Seabury as their bishop in 1783, he sought consecration in England. The Oath of Supremacy prevented Seabury's consecration in England, so he went to Scotland; the non-juring bishops of the Scottish Episcopal Church consecrated him in Aberdeen on November 14, 1784, making him, in the words of scholar Arthur Carl Piepkorn, "the first Anglican bishop appointed to minister outside the British Isles". On August 3, 1785, the first ordinations on American soil took place at Christ Church in Middletown, Connecticut.

That same year, 1785, deputations of clergy and laity met in the first General Convention. They drafted a constitution, proposed a first draft of an American Book of Common Prayer, and began negotiating with English Bishops for the consecration of three bishops. The convention met again in 1786 to make several changes that made their liturgy acceptable to the English bishops and to recommend three clergy (who had been elected by state meetings in Virginia, Pennsylvania, and New York) for consecration as bishops. General Convention met again in 1789, beginning a regular process of meeting every three years. At the 1789 convention they adopted a constitution and canons, and reorganized as a House of Deputies and a House of Bishops. The structure of the Episcopal Church was then complete.

Later, through the efforts of Bishop Philander Chase (1775–1852) of Ohio, Americans successfully sought material assistance from England for the purpose of training Episcopal clergy. The development of the Protestant Episcopal Church provides an example of how Americans in the early republic maintained important cultural ties with England.

In 1787, two priests – William White of Pennsylvania and Samuel Provoost of New York – were consecrated as bishops by the archbishop of Canterbury, the archbishop of York, and the bishop of Bath and Wells, the legal obstacles having been removed by the passage through Parliament of the Consecration of Bishops Abroad Act 1786. Thus there are two branches of apostolic succession for the American bishops: through the non-juring bishops of Scotland who consecrated Samuel Seabury and through the English bishops who consecrated William White, Samuel Provoost, and James Madison (not the future President). All bishops in the American church are ordained by at least three bishops. The succession of each bishop can be historically traced back to Seabury, White, Provoost, and Madison. (See Succession of Bishops of the Episcopal Church.)

From July 28 to August 8, 1789, representative clergy from nine dioceses met in Philadelphia to ratify the church's initial constitution; they also formally adopted the name Protestant Episcopal Church. The fourth bishop of the Episcopal Church was James Madison, the first bishop of Virginia. Madison was consecrated in 1790 by the Archbishop of Canterbury and two other Church of England bishops. This third American bishop consecrated within the English line of succession occurred because of continuing unease within the Church of England over Seabury's non-juring Scottish orders. The Episcopal Church thus became the first Anglican province outside the British Isles.

On 17 September 1792, at the triennial General Convention (synod) of the Episcopal Church at Trinity Church on Wall Street, in New York City, Thomas John Claggett who had been elected by the clergy and laity of Maryland, was consecrated by all four of the existing bishops. He was the first bishop of the Episcopal Church ordained and consecrated in America and the fifth bishop consecrated for the Episcopal Church in the United States.

=== Nineteenth century ===
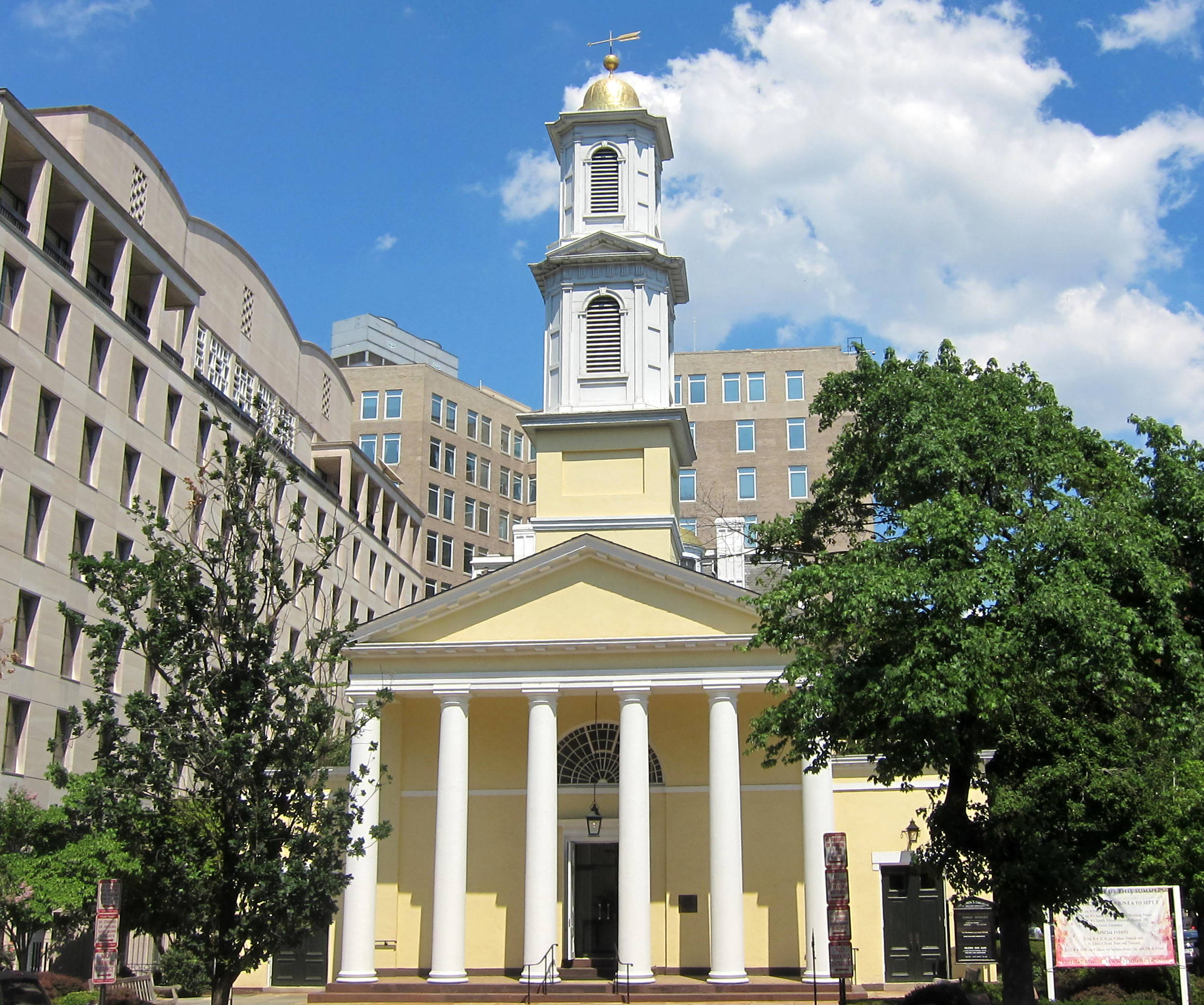
St. John's Episcopal Church, built in 1816 in Washington, D.C., is known as the "Church of the Presidents" for the many presidents who have worshiped there.

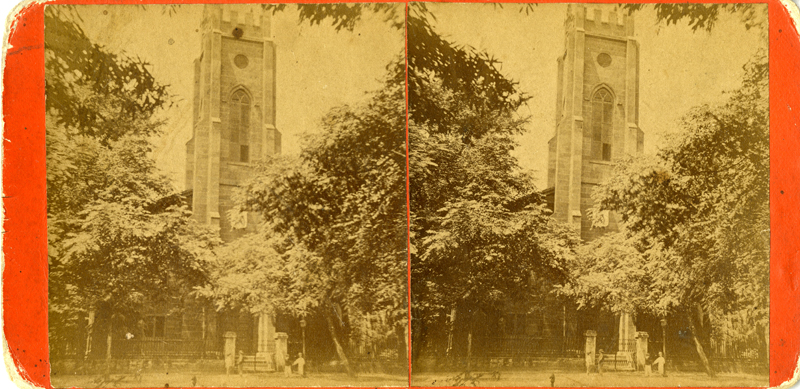
Christ Episcopal Church, Macon, Georgia, c. 1877

In 1856, the first society for African Americans in the Episcopal Church was founded by James Theodore Holly. Named The Protestant Episcopal Society for Promoting The Extension of The Church Among Colored People, the society argued that blacks should be allowed to participate in seminaries and diocesan conventions. The group lost its focus when Holly emigrated to Haiti, but other groups followed after the Civil War. The current Union of Black Episcopalians traces its history to the society. Holly went on to found the Anglican Church in Haiti, where he became the first African-American bishop on November 8, 1874. As Bishop of Haiti, Holly was the first African American to attend the Lambeth Conference. However, he was consecrated by the American Church Missionary Society, an Evangelical Episcopal branch of the Church.

Episcopal missions chartered by African Americans in this era were chartered as a Colored Episcopal Mission. All other missions (white) were chartered as an Organized Episcopal Mission. Many historically Black parishes are still in existence to date.

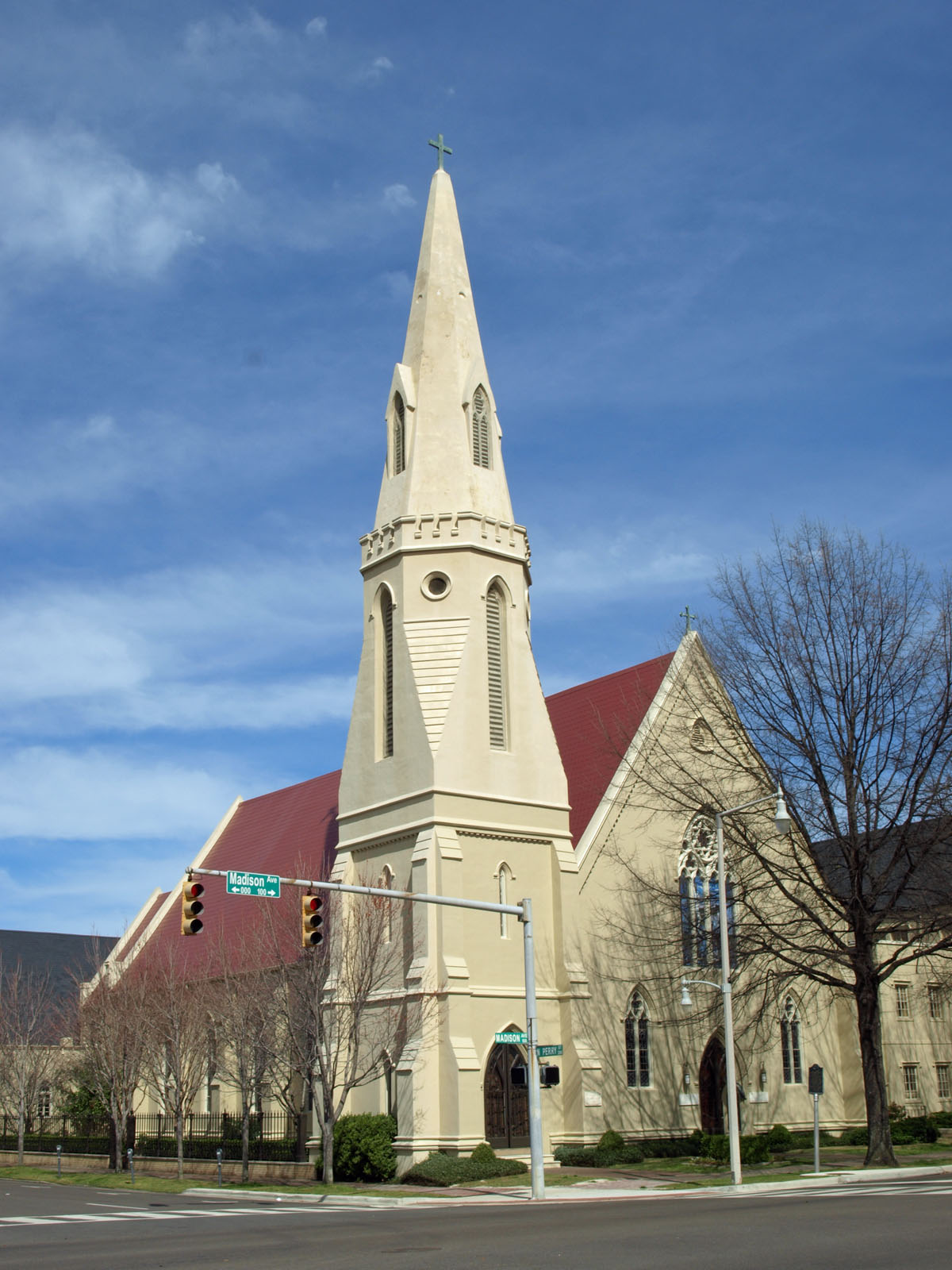
St. John's Episcopal Church in Montgomery, Alabama, established in 1834. The church building was completed in 1855. The Secession Convention of Southern Churches was held here in 1861.

When the American Civil War began in 1861, Episcopalians in the South formed the Protestant Episcopal Church in the Confederate States of America. However, in the North, the separation was never officially recognized. In particular, the Episcopalian communities in Pennsylvania supported free black communities and the Underground Railroad. By May 16, 1866, the southern dioceses had rejoined the national church.

By the middle of the 19th century, evangelical Episcopalians disturbed by High Church Tractarianism, while continuing to work in interdenominational agencies, formed their own voluntary societies, and eventually, in 1874, a faction objecting to the revival of ritual practices established the Reformed Episcopal Church.

Samuel David Ferguson was the first black bishop consecrated by the Episcopal Church, the first to practice in the U.S. and the first black person to sit in the House of Bishops. Bishop Ferguson was consecrated on June 24, 1885, with the then-Presiding Bishop of the Episcopal Church acting as a consecrator.

In the following year, Henry C. Potter, Bishop of the Episcopal Diocese of New York, addressed his clergymen upon the question of Labor. Church Association for the Advancement of the Interests of Labor was formed in 1887.

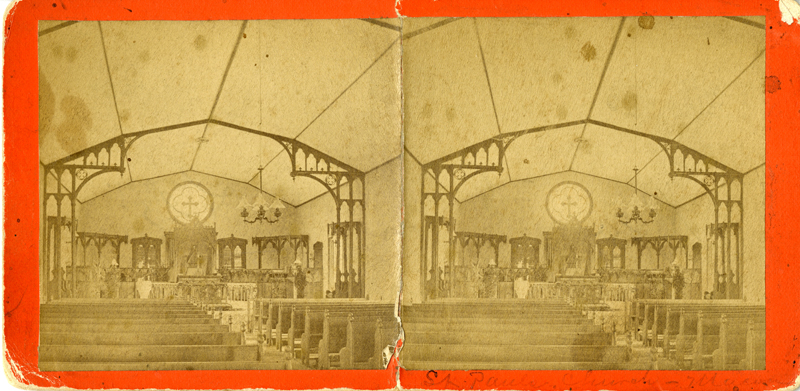
Saint Paul's Episcopal Church, interior, 1872

During the Gilded Age, highly prominent laity such as bankers J. P. Morgan, industrialist Henry Ford, and art collector Isabella Stewart Gardner played a central role in shaping a distinctive upper class Episcopalian ethos, especially with regard to preserving the arts and history. These philanthropists propelled the Episcopal Church into a quasi-national position of importance while at the same time giving the church a central role in the cultural transformation of the country. Another mark of influence is the fact that more than a quarter of all presidents of the United States have been Episcopalians (see religious affiliations of presidents of the United States). It was during this period that the Book of Common Prayer was revised, first in 1892 and later in 1928.

=== Era of change (1958–1970s) ===
In 1955, the church's general convention was moved from Houston to Honolulu, due to continuing racial segregation in the former city. At the 1958 general convention, a coalition of liberal church members succeeded in passing a resolution recognizing "the natural dignity and value of every man, of whatever color or race, as created in the image of God". It called on Episcopalians "to work together, in charity and forbearance, towards the establishment ... of full opportunities in fields such as education, housing, employment and public accommodations". A 2,500-word pastoral letter was sent by the House of Bishops to be read at all 7,290 Episcopal churches, urging justice in racial matters, with reference to the Supreme Court decision on integration in public schools. In response, the Episcopal Society for Cultural and Racial Unity (ESCRU) was founded in December 1959 in order to eliminate racial, ethnic, and class barriers within the Episcopal Church. Opposition from southern church leaders prevented the Episcopal Church from taking a strong stand on civil rights prior to 1963. One prominent opponent of the movement was Charles C.J. Carpenter, the bishop of Alabama. By 1963, many church leaders felt more comfortable speaking out in support of racial equality. That year, Presiding Bishop Arthur Lichtenberger wrote a pastoral letter urging Christians to work "across lines of racial separation, in a common struggle for justice", and the House of Bishops endorsed civil rights legislation. Tensions around the civil rights movement persisted, however. At the 1964 General Convention, when the House of Deputies rejected a resolution sanctioning civil disobedience under special circumstances, Thurgood Marshall, a deputy to the convention, led many African-American deputies in a "walk out" protest of the convention.

In 1967, Lichtenberger's successor, John Hines, led the Episcopal Church to implement the General Convention Special Program (GCSP). The program was designed to redirect nine million dollars over a three-year period (a quarter of the church's operating budget at the time) to fund special grants for community organizations and grassroots efforts facilitating black empowerment in America's urban ghettos. The effectiveness of the GCSP was limited due to the reluctance of conservative bishops in southern dioceses, who objected to the awarding of grants to groups perceived as radical. The GCSP drew opposition from the recently formed Foundation for Christian Theology, a conservative organization opposed to "involv[ing] the Church in the social, political, and economic activities of our times". The Special General Convention also witnessed protests of the Vietnam War. During this time period, African-American clergy organized the Union of Black Episcopalians to achieve full inclusion of African Americans at all levels of the Episcopal Church.

Women were first admitted as delegates to the church's general convention in 1970.

In 1975, Vaughan Booker, who confessed to the murder of his wife and was sentenced to life in prison, was ordained to the diaconate in Graterford State Prison's chapel in Pennsylvania after having repented of his sins, becoming a symbol of redemption and atonement.

=== Recent history ===
In recent decades, the Episcopal Church, like other mainline churches, has experienced a decline in membership as well as internal controversy over women's ordination and the place of homosexuals in the church. The 1976 General Convention also passed a resolution calling for an end to apartheid in South Africa and in 1985 called for "dioceses, institutions, and agencies" to create equal opportunity employment and affirmative action policies to address any potential "racial inequities" in clergy placement. Because of these and other controversial issues including abortion, individual members and clergy can and do frequently disagree with the stated position of the church's leadership. In January 2016, the Anglican Primates Meeting at Canterbury, England, decided that in response to the "distance" caused by what it called "unilateral action on matters of doctrine without catholic unity", "for a period of three years, The Episcopal Church [would neither] represent [the Communion] on ecumenical and interfaith bodies… [nor] take part in decision making on any issues pertaining to doctrine or polity."

==== Revised prayer book ====
In 1976, the General Convention adopted a new prayer book, which was a substantial revision and modernization of the previous 1928 edition. It incorporated many principles of the ecumenical movement and liturgical movement, which had been discussed at Vatican II as well. This version was adopted as the official prayer book in 1979 after an initial three-year trial use. As such, the liturgies used by the Catholic, Lutheran, Episcopal, Presbyterian/ Reformed and Methodist traditions are "nearly identical". Several conservative parishes, however, continued to use the 1928 version. In Advent of 2007, the use of the ecumenical Revised Common Lectionary in the Episcopal Church became the standard. In 2018, the General Convention authorized a Task Force for Liturgical and Prayer Book Revision to consider further revisions, particularly to use more inclusive language and to give more attention to the stewardship of God's creation.

==== Ordination of women ====
On July 29, 1974, a group of women known as the Philadelphia Eleven were irregularly ordained as priests in the Episcopal Church by bishops Daniel Corrigan, Robert L. DeWitt, and Edward R. Welles, assisted by Antonio Ramos. On September 7, 1975, four more women (the "Washington Four") were irregularly ordained by retired bishop George W. Barrett. In the wake of the controversy over the ordination of the Philadelphia Eleven, the General Convention permitted the ordination of women in 1976 and recognized the ordinations of the 15 forerunners. The first woman canonically ordained to the Episcopal priesthood was Jacqueline Means on January 1, 1977, followed shortly thereafter by Tanya Vonnegut Beck. Both were ordained at All Saints Church in Indianapolis, Indiana. The first woman to become a bishop, Barbara Harris, was consecrated on February 11, 1989.

At the same time, there was still tolerance for those dioceses which opposed women's ordination. In 1994, the General Convention affirmed that there was value in the theological position that women should not be ordained. In 1997, however, the General Convention then determined that "the canons regarding the ordination, licensing, and deployment of women are mandatory" and required noncompliant dioceses to issue status reports on their progress towards full compliance.

In 2006, the General Convention elected Katharine Jefferts Schori as Presiding Bishop. She was the first woman to become a primate in the Anglican Communion. Schori's election was controversial in the wider Anglican Communion because not all of the communion recognized the ordination of women.

At the time of the formation of the Anglican Church in North America (ACNA), three U.S. dioceses did not ordain women as priests or bishops: San Joaquin, Quincy, and Fort Worth. Following the departures of their conservative majorities to ACNA, all three dioceses within the Episcopal Church now ordain women. With the October 16, 2010, ordination of Margaret Lee, in the Peoria-based Diocese of Quincy, Illinois, women have been ordained as priests in all dioceses of the Episcopal Church in the United States.

==== LGBT issues ====
The Episcopal Church affirmed at the 1976 General Convention that homosexuals are "children of God" who deserve acceptance and pastoral care from the church and equal protection under the law. The first openly gay person ordained as a priest was Ellen Barrett in 1977. Despite such an affirmation of gay rights, the General Convention affirmed in 1991 that "physical sexual expression" is only appropriate within the monogamous lifelong "union of husband and wife".

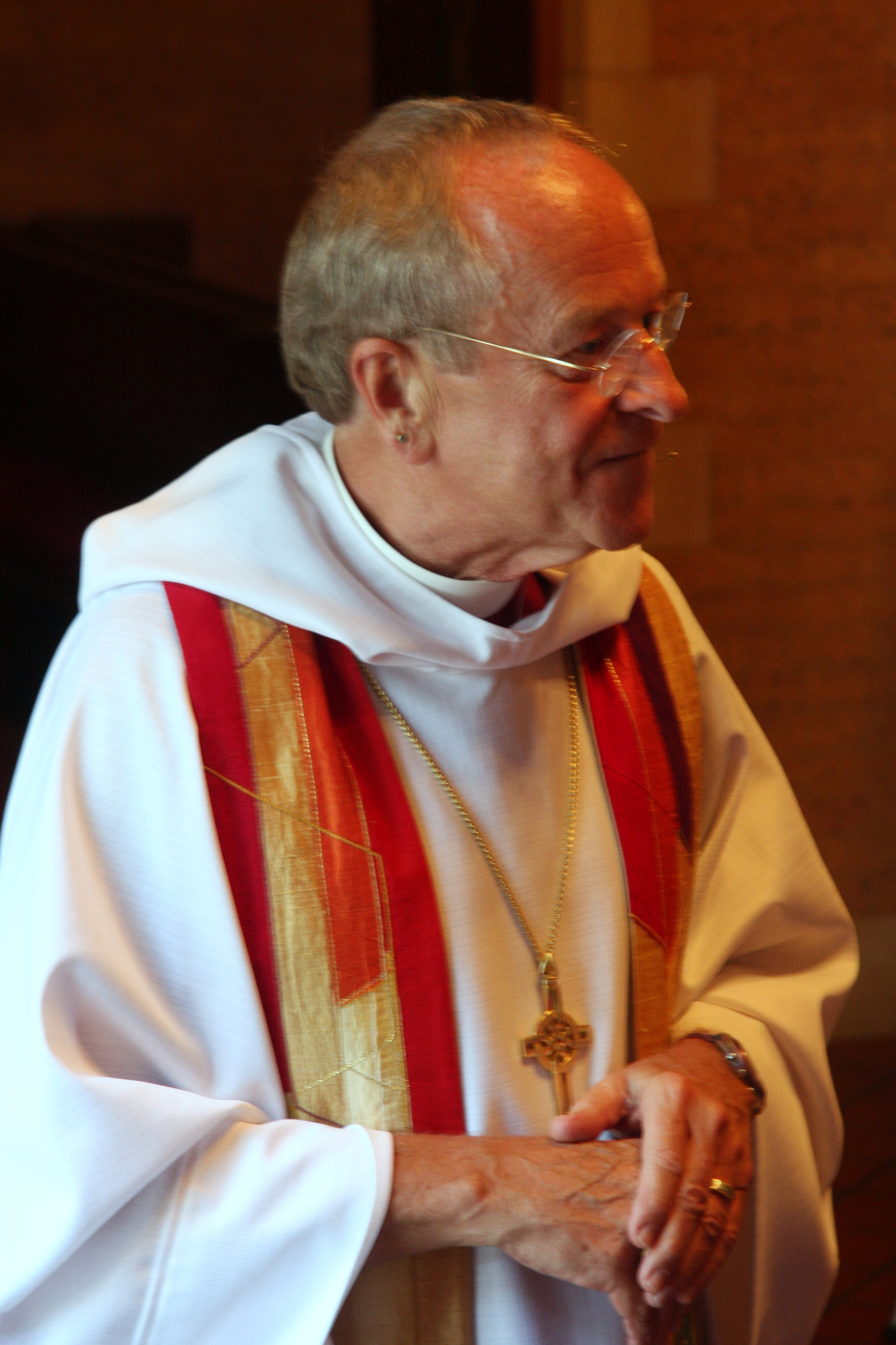
Gene Robinson in 2013

The church elected its first openly gay bishop, Gene Robinson, in June 2003. News of Robinson's election caused a crisis in both the American church and the wider Anglican Communion. In October 2003, Anglican primates (the heads of the Anglican Communion's 38 member churches) convened an emergency meeting. The meeting's final communiqué included the warning that if Robinson's consecration proceeded, it would "tear the fabric of the communion at its deepest level". The news of his ordination caused such an outrage that during the ceremony Robinson wore a bullet-proof vest beneath his vestments, and he also received numerous death threats following his installation as bishop of the Episcopal Diocese of New Hampshire.

In 2009, the General Convention charged the Standing Commission on Liturgy and Music to develop theological and liturgical resources for same-sex blessings and report back to the General Convention in 2012. It also gave bishops an option to provide "generous pastoral support", especially where civil authorities have legalized same-gender marriage, civil unions, or domestic partnerships.

On July 14, 2009, the Episcopal Church's House of Bishops voted that "any ordained ministry" is open to homosexual men and women. The New York Times said the move was "likely to send shockwaves through the Anglican Communion". This vote ended a moratorium on ordaining gay bishops passed in 2006 and passed in spite of Archbishop Rowan Williams's personal call at the start of the convention that, "I hope and pray that there won't be decisions in the coming days that will push us further apart."

On July 10, 2012, the Episcopal Church approved an official liturgy for the blessing of same-sex relationships. This liturgy was not a marriage rite, but the blessing included an exchange of vows and the couple's agreement to enter into a lifelong committed relationship.

On June 29, 2015, at the 78th General Convention of the Episcopal Church, a resolution removing the definition of marriage as being between one man and one woman was passed by the House of Bishops with 129 in favor, 26 against, and 5 abstaining. The then archbishop of Canterbury, Justin Welby, expressed "deep concern" over the ruling. In 2016, Anglican leaders temporarily suspended the Episcopal Church from key positions in their global fellowship in response to the church changing its canons on marriage.

Transgender people have also joined the priesthood in the Episcopal Church. The Rev. Cameron Partridge, who transitioned in 2001 and was ordained in 2005, was the first openly transgender priest to preach at the Washington National Cathedral. In 2022, the 80th General Convention of the Episcopal Church, affirmed its position in favor of access to gender affirming care, including all forms of medical transition for people of any age, as a part of the Baptismal call to "respect the dignity of every human being."

==== Separations from the church ====
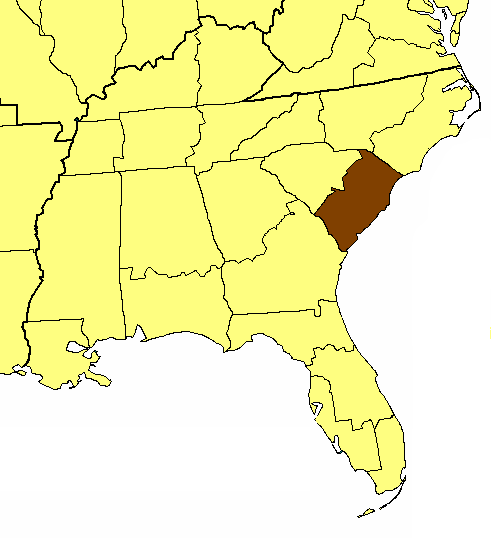
Many members and parishes of the historic Diocese of South Carolina left the Episcopal Church in 2012, eventually becoming a diocese of the Anglican Church in North America.

Following the ordination of Bp. Gene Robinson in 2003, some members of a number of congregations left the Episcopal Church. For example, in Cleveland, Ohio, four parishes "with about 1,300 active members, decided to leave the U.S. church and the local diocese because of 'divergent understandings of the authority of scripture and traditional Christian teaching.'" Four dioceses also voted to leave the church; Pittsburgh, Quincy, Fort Worth, and San Joaquin. The stated reasons included those expressed by the Pittsburgh diocese, which complained that the church had been "hijacked" by liberal bishops. A few years later, in 2012, the Diocese of South Carolina voted to withdraw.

The Episcopal Church did not acknowledge any of the purported diocesan withdrawals, stating that under canon law an Episcopal diocese cannot withdraw itself from the larger Episcopal Church. In a "pastoral letter" to the South Carolina diocese, Presiding Bishop Schori wrote that "While some leaders have expressed a desire to leave the Episcopal Church, the Diocese has not left. It cannot, by its own action. The alteration, dissolution, or departure of a diocese of the Episcopal Church requires the consent of General Convention, which has not been consulted." She further wrote that the South Carolina diocese "continues to be a constituent part of The Episcopal Church, even if a number of its leaders have departed. If it becomes fully evident that those former leaders have, indeed, fully severed their ties with the Episcopal Church, new leaders will be elected and installed by the action of a Diocesan Convention recognized by the wider Episcopal Church, in accordance with our Constitution and Canons."

Many departing members joined the Continuing Anglican movement or advocated Anglican realignment, claiming alignment with overseas Anglican provinces including the Anglican Province of the Southern Cone of America and the Church of Nigeria. Some former members formed the Anglican Church in North America which, as of 2017, claimed over 1,000 congregations and 134,000 members. Episcopal Church leaders, particularly former presiding bishop Katharine Jefferts Schori, responded by taking a firm stance against the separatists. Litigation between the church and departing dioceses and parishes cost all parties tens of millions of dollars; one estimate has the Episcopal Church spending over $42 million and separatists roughly $18 million, for a total of over $60 million in court costs. Litigation has largely centered on church properties. Episcopal leadership asserts that, as a hierarchical church, they retain ownership of parish property when parishioners leave. Departing groups, in contrast, assert that they should be able to retain ownership of individual church facilities and diocesan property.

==== Church property disputes ====
In a letter to the House of Bishops during summer 2009, Presiding Bishop Katharine Jefferts Schori instructed local dioceses not to sell parish property to departing groups. She stated: "We do not make settlements that encourage religious bodies who seek to replace the Episcopal Church".

Before Schori took this stand, prior bishops had treated parish property disputes as internal diocesan matters that are "not subject to the review or oversight of the presiding bishop". One example was when then-Presiding Bishop Frank Griswold told the Diocese of Western Louisiana on May 11, 2006, that the national church involved itself in parish property disputes only upon invitation of the local bishop and diocesan standing committees. Schori's letter stated that her firm stance was the consensus of the Council of Advice and expressed hope that "those who have departed can gain clarity about their own identity".

After the South Carolina diocese voted to withdraw, it sued the national Episcopal Church to retain control over its property. The departing diocese mostly won on appeal to the South Carolina Supreme Court. Multiple parishes affiliated with the departing group were allowed to keep their property. Other church and diocesan property in the lawsuit remained with the Episcopal Church and its affiliated local diocese. The name "Episcopal Diocese of South Carolina" and related names and marks were initially claimed by the departing group. In 2019, a federal court ruled that they legally belonged to the Episcopal Church. The departing diocese was renamed the Anglican Diocese of South Carolina.

== Membership ==
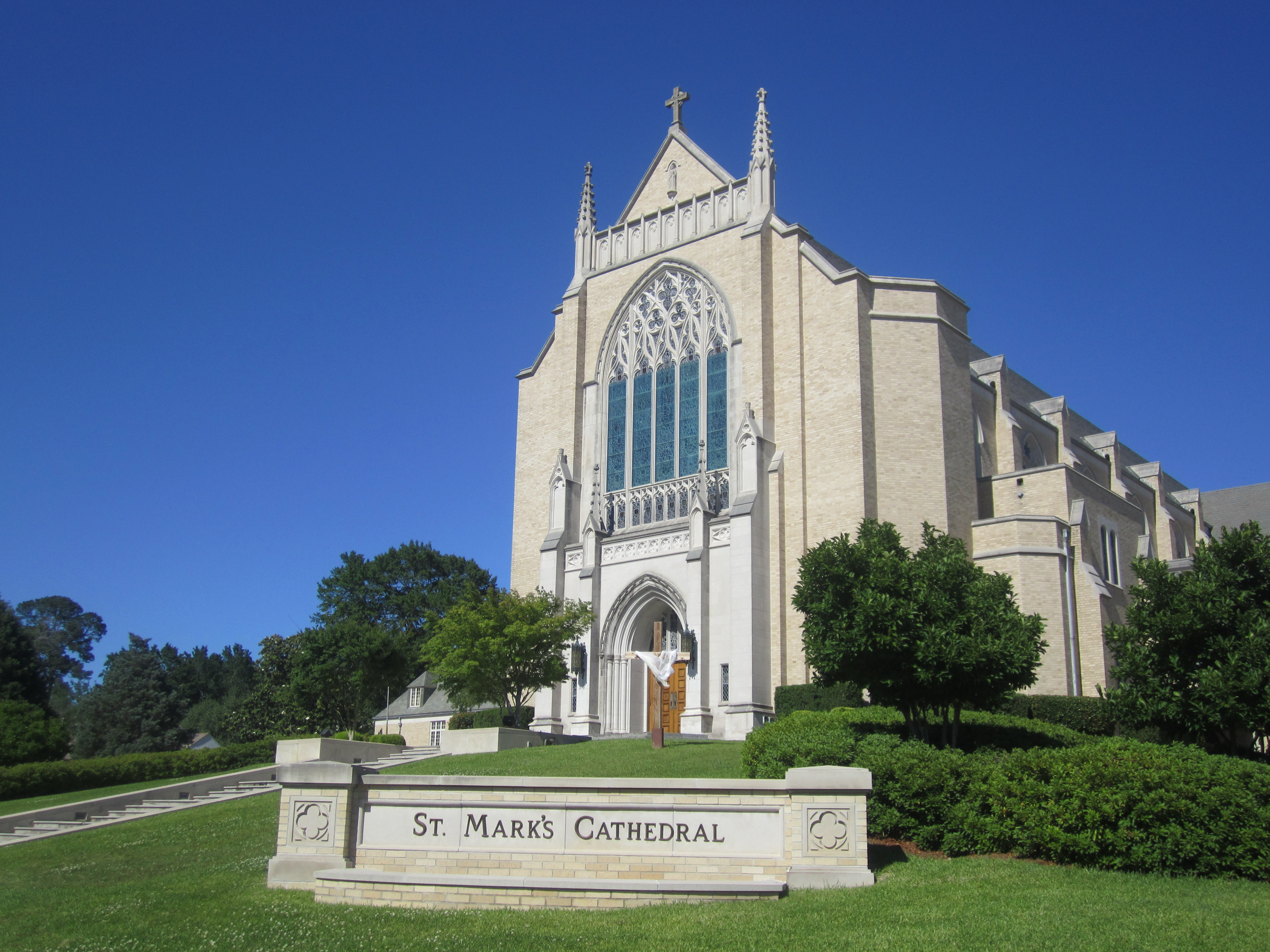
St. Mark's Episcopal Cathedral in Shreveport, Louisiana

In 1986, the Episcopal Church adopted a "revised definition of membership," counting only active baptized members; previously, the church counted all baptized members. As of 2023, the Episcopal Church had 1,547,779 active baptized members, of whom 1,394,769 were in the United States. In 2025, the number of active baptized members was 1,425,065.

According to a report by American Religious Identify Survey or ARIS/Barna in 2001, 3.5 million Americans self-identified as Episcopalians, highlighting "a gap between those who are affiliated with the church (on membership rolls), versus those who self-identify [as Episcopalians]". More recently, in 2025, Pew Research found that approximately 1 percent of 267 million U.S. adults, around 2.67 million people, self-identified as mainline Episcopalian/Anglican.

Total average Sunday attendance (ASA) for 2018 was 962,529 (933,206 in the U.S. and 29,323 outside the U.S.), a decrease of 24.7% percent from 2008. In 2024, reporting online attendance for the first time, in-person ASA was 413,034 with online ASA being 121,545; average weekly in-person attendance was 183,156 with online weekly attendance being 75,103. In 2025, the church reported 407,001 in-person ASA, 116,936 online ASA, 178,795 in-person weekly attendance, and 83,032 online weekly attendance.

The Episcopal Church has also collected data on persons active in congregations who are not baptized members. In 2019, the church reported 164,568 "others active in congregations" who were not baptized members. In 2021, the last time the data were collected, the church reported 141,867 persons among "others active in congregations."

According to data collected in 2000, the District of Columbia, Rhode Island, Connecticut, and Virginia have the highest rates of adherents per capita, and states along the East Coast generally have a higher number of adherents per capita than in other parts of the country. New York was the state with the largest total number of adherents, over 200,000. In 2013, the Episcopal Diocese of Haiti was the largest single diocese, with 84,301 baptized members, which constitute slightly over half of the church's foreign membership.

As of 2019, roughly half (48%) of those identifying as Episcopalian are converts; the vast majority of converts (93%) were raised in another Christian denomination, with 37% coming from Mainline Protestantism, 29% from Roman Catholicism, 24% from Evangelical Protestantism, and 3% from some other Christian tradition. In the years preceding 2012 over 225,000 Roman Catholics became Episcopalians and as of 2012, there are "432 living Episcopal priests [who] have been received [as priests] from the Roman Catholic Church."

The Episcopal Church experienced notable growth in the first half of the 20th century, but like many mainline churches, it has had a decline in membership in more recent decades. Membership grew from 1.1 million members in 1925 to a peak of over 3.4 million members in the mid-1960s. Between 1970 and 1990, membership declined from about 3.2 million to about 2.4 million. Once changes in how membership is counted are taken into consideration, the Episcopal Church's membership numbers were broadly flat throughout the 1990s, with a slight growth in the first years of the 21st century.

Some theories about the decline in membership include a failure to sufficiently reach beyond ethnic barriers in an increasingly diverse society, and the low fertility rates prevailing among the predominant ethnic groups traditionally belonging to the church. As of 2023-24, Episcopal Church membership remains predominantly white (86%). In 2025, Molly James, an interim executive officer, reported that the Episcopal Church's decline is "primarily because of a decline in birth rates: Episcopalians simply have fewer children than they did during the mid-20th century." In 1965, there were 880,000 children in Episcopal Sunday School programs. By 2001, the number had declined to 297,000.

=== Political leanings ===
The Episcopal Church used to be heavily associated with the Republican Party, such that it was jokingly referred to as "the Republican Party at prayer." Episcopalians were often associated with the Rockefeller Republican wing of the Republican Party. This demonstrated the perception of many Episcopalians' "political conservatism [and] theological liberalism." During the 1970s, Episcopalian Republicans were associated with the more socially liberal wing of the Republican Party.

As of 2023-24, according to a Pew Research Center study, members of the Episcopal Church tend to identify more as moderate (34%) or liberal (34%) rather than conservative (30%). According to that same study, 57% describe themselves as Democrats or Democratic-leaning independents, 38% describe themselves as Republicans or Republican-leaning independents, and 4% state that they do not identify with either party.

== Influence ==
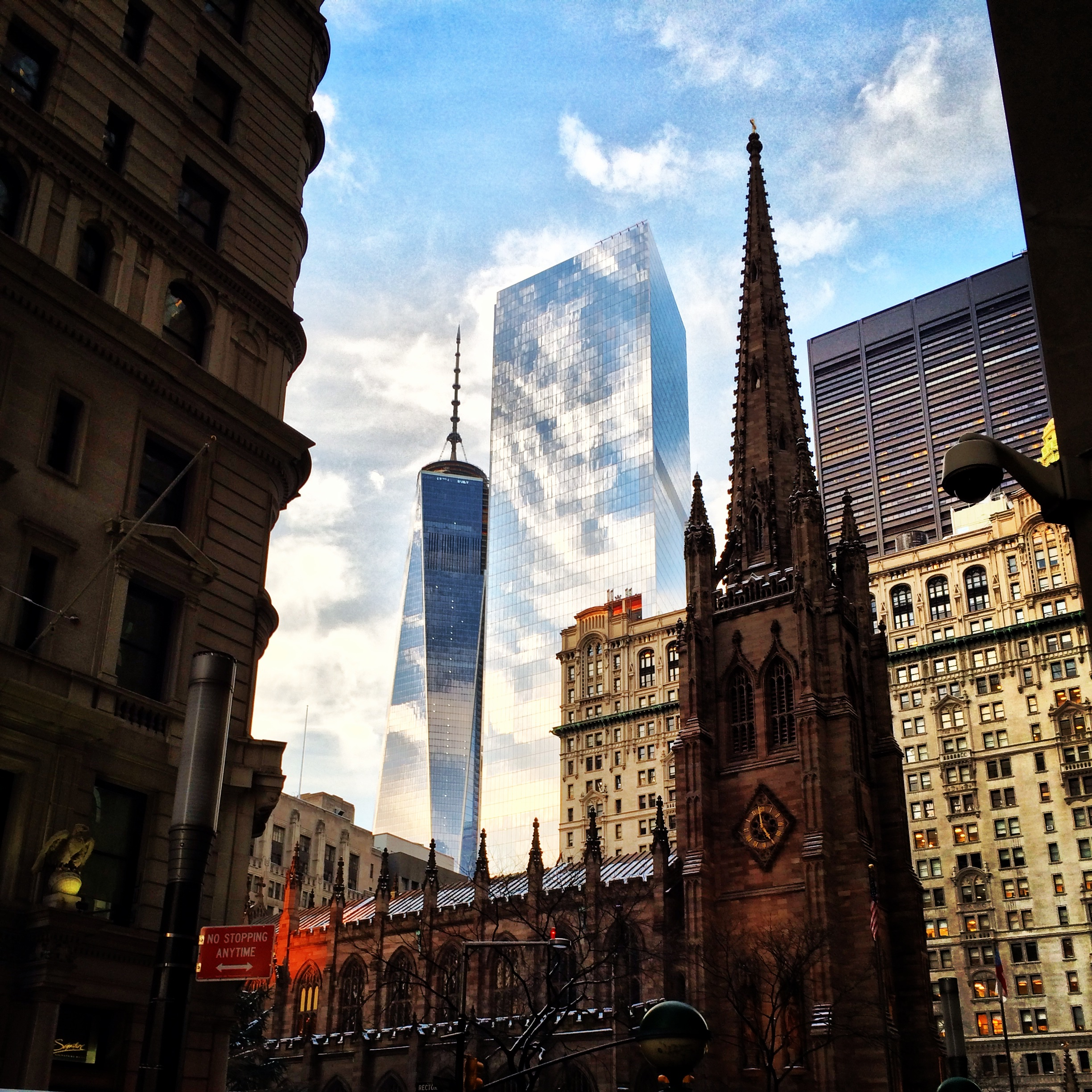
Trinity Church in Manhattan

In the twentieth century, Episcopalians tended to be wealthier and more educated (having more graduate and postgraduate degrees per capita) than most other religious groups in the United States, and were disproportionately represented in the upper reaches of American business, law, and politics. Many of the nation's oldest educational institutions, such as University of Pennsylvania and Columbia University, were founded by Episcopal clergy or were associated with the Episcopal Church. According to Pew Research Center Episcopal Church "has often been seen as the religious institution most closely associated with the American establishment, producing many of the nation's most important leaders in politics and business." About a quarter of the presidents of the United States (11) were members of the Episcopal Church.

Historically, Episcopalians were overrepresented among American scientific elite and Nobel Prize winners. According to Scientific Elite: Nobel Laureates in the United States by Harriet Zuckerman, between 1901 and 1972, 72% of American Nobel Prize laureates have come from a Protestant background, mostly from Episcopalian, Presbyterian or Lutheran background. Citing Gallup polling data from 1976, Kit and Frederica Konolige wrote in their 1978 book The Power of Their Glory, "As befits a church that belongs to the worldwide Anglican Communion, Episcopalianism has the United Kingdom to thank for the ancestors of fully 49 percent of its members. ... The stereotype of the White Anglo-Saxon Protestant (WASP) finds its fullest expression in the Episcopal Church."

The Boston Brahmins, who were regarded as the nation's social and cultural elites, were often associated with the American upper class, Harvard University; and the Episcopal Church. Old Philadelphians were often associated with the Episcopal Church. Old money in the United States was typically associated with White Anglo-Saxon Protestant ("WASP") status, particularly with the Episcopal and Presbyterian Church. In the 1970s, a Fortune magazine study found one-in-five of the country's largest businesses and one-in-three of its largest banks was run by an Episcopalian. Numbers of the most wealthy and affluent American families such as the Vanderbilts, Astors, Du Ponts, Whitneys, Morgans, Fords, Mellons, Van Leers, Browns, Waynes and Harrimans are Episcopalians. While the Rockefeller family are mostly Baptists, some of the Rockefellers were Episcopalians.

According to a 2014 study by the Pew Research Center, the Episcopal Church also has the highest number of graduate and post-graduate degrees per capita (56%) of any other Christian denomination in the United States, as well as the most high-income earners. According to The New York Times Episcopalians tend also to be better educated and they have a high number of graduate (76%) and post-graduate degrees (35%) per capita. According to a 2014 study by the Pew Research Center, Episcopalians ranked as the third wealthiest religious group in the United States, with 35% of Episcopalians living in households with incomes of at least $100,000. In 2014, roughly 70% of Episcopalians were living in households with incomes of $50,000 or above. In recent years, the church has become much more economically and racially diverse through evangelism, and has attracted many Hispanic immigrants who are often working-class. According to the Pew Research Center’s 2023–24 Religious Landscape Study, 67% of adherents of the Episcopal Church hold a bachelor’s degree or higher, making them one of the most highly educated Christian groups in the United States and the second most highly educated religious group overall in America.

== Structure ==
The Episcopal Church is governed according to episcopal polity with its own system of canon law. This means that the church is organized into dioceses led by bishops in consultation with representative bodies. It is a unitary body, in that the power of the General Convention is not limited by the individual dioceses. The church has, however, a highly decentralized structure and characteristics of a confederation.

=== Parishes and dioceses ===
At the local level, there are 6,447 Episcopal congregations, each of which elects a vestry or bishop's committee. Subject to the approval of its diocesan bishop, the vestry of each parish elects a priest, called the rector, who has spiritual jurisdiction in the parish and selects assistant clergy, both deacons and priests. (There is a difference between vestry and clergy elections – clergy are ordained members usually selected from outside the parish, whereas any member in good standing of a parish is eligible to serve on the vestry.) The diocesan bishop, however, appoints the clergy for all missions and may choose to do so for non-self-supporting parishes.

The middle judicatory consists of a diocese headed by a bishop who is assisted by a standing committee. The bishop and standing committee are elected by the diocesan convention whose members are canonically resident clergy of the diocese and laity selected by the congregations. The election of a bishop requires the consent of a majority of standing committees and diocesan bishops. Conventions meet annually to consider legislation (such as revisions to the diocesan constitution and canons) and speak for the diocese. Dioceses are organized into nine provinces. Each province has a synod and a mission budget, but it has no authority over its member dioceses.

There are 106 dioceses in the United States, Colombia, the Dominican Republic, Ecuador, Haiti, Honduras, Puerto Rico, Taiwan, Venezuela, Cuba and the Virgin Islands. The Convocation of Episcopal Churches in Europe and the Navajoland Area Mission are jurisdictions similar to a diocese.

=== Governance ===
The Washington National Cathedral is the seat of the presiding bishop of the Episcopal Church as well as the bishop of the Episcopal Diocese of Washington.

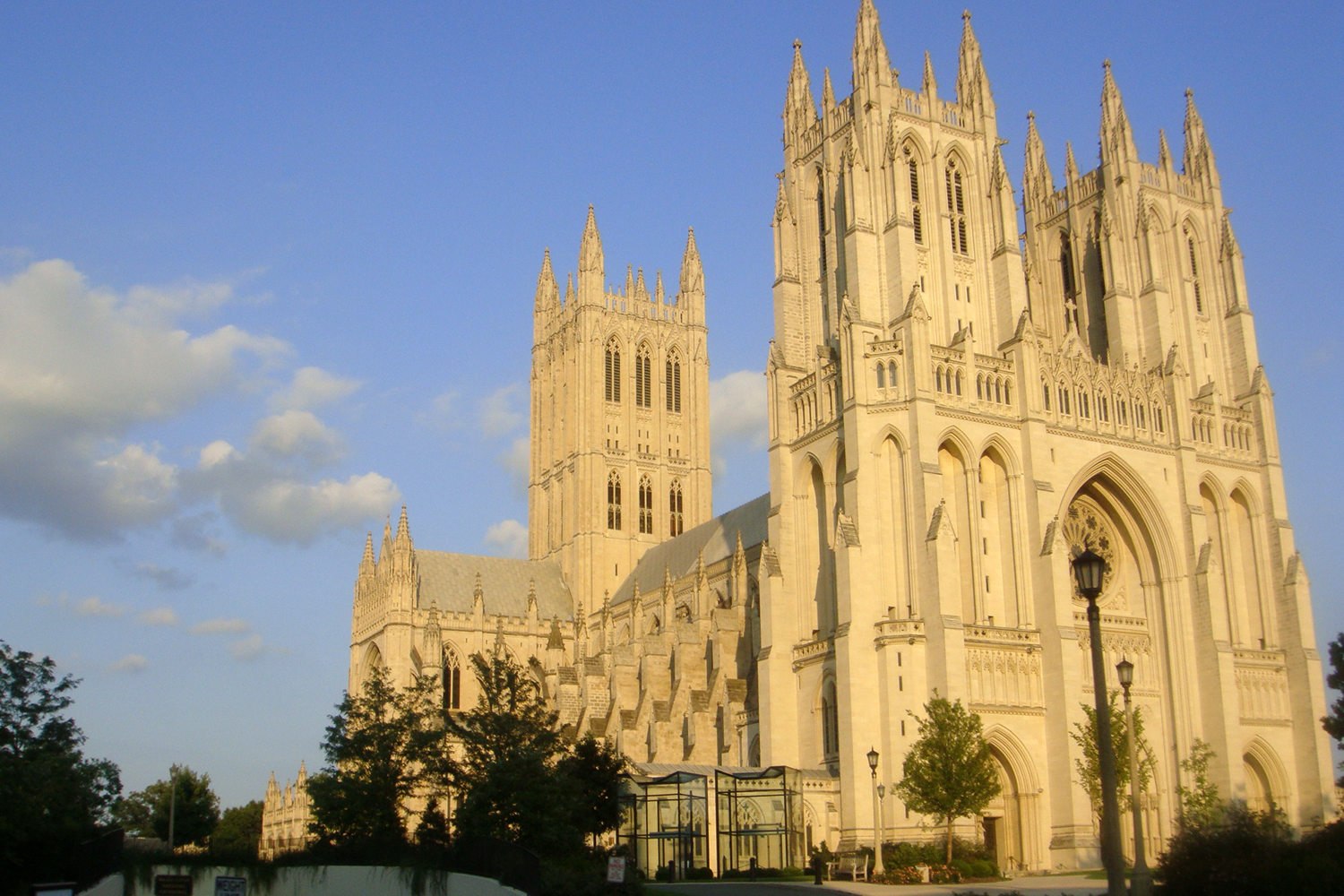
The Cathedral Church of Saint Peter and Saint Paul in the City and Diocese of Washington, located in Washington, D.C., is operated under the more familiar name of Washington National Cathedral.

The highest legislative body of the Episcopal Church is the triennial General Convention, consisting of the House of Deputies and the House of Bishops. All active (whether diocesan, coadjutor, suffragan, or assistant) and retired bishops make up the over 300 members of the House of Bishops. Diocesan conventions elect over 800 representatives (each diocese elects four laity and four clergy) to the House of Deputies. The House of Deputies elects a president and vice-president to preside at meetings. General Convention enacts two types of legislation. The first type is the rules by which the church is governed as contained in the Constitution and Canons; the second type are broad guidelines on church policy called resolutions. Either house may propose legislation. The House of Deputies only meets as a full body once every three years; however, the House of Bishops meets regularly throughout the triennium between conventions.

The real work of General Convention is done by interim bodies, the most powerful being the Executive Council, which oversees the work of the national church during the triennium. The council has 40 members; 20 are directly elected by the General Convention, 18 are elected by the nine provinces, and the presiding bishop and president of the House of Deputies are ex officio members. Other interim bodies include a number of standing commissions ordered by the canons and temporary task forces formulated by resolutions of General Convention. Both types of bodies study and draft policy proposals for consideration and report back to the convention. Each standing commission consists of five bishops, five priests or deacons, and ten laypersons. Bishops are appointed by the Presiding Bishop while the other clergy and laypersons are appointed by the president of the House of Deputies. Task forces vary in size, composition, and duration depending on the General Convention resolution that orders them.

The presiding bishop is elected from and by the House of Bishops and confirmed by the House of Deputies for a nine-year term. The presiding bishop is the chief pastor and primate of the Episcopal Church and is charged with providing leadership in the development of the church's program as well as speaking on behalf of the church. The presiding bishop does not possess a territorial see; since the 1970s, however, the presiding bishop has enjoyed extraordinary jurisdiction (metropolitical authority) and has authority to visit dioceses for sacramental and preaching ministry, for consulting bishops, and for related purposes. The presiding bishop chairs the House of Bishops as well as the Executive Council of the General Convention. In addition, the presiding bishop directs the Episcopal Church Center, the national administrative headquarters of the denomination. Located at 815 Second Avenue, New York City, New York, the center is often referred to by Episcopalians simply as "815".

A system of ecclesiastical courts is provided for under Title IV of the canons of General Convention. These courts are empowered to discipline and depose deacons, priests, and bishops.

== Worship and liturgy ==
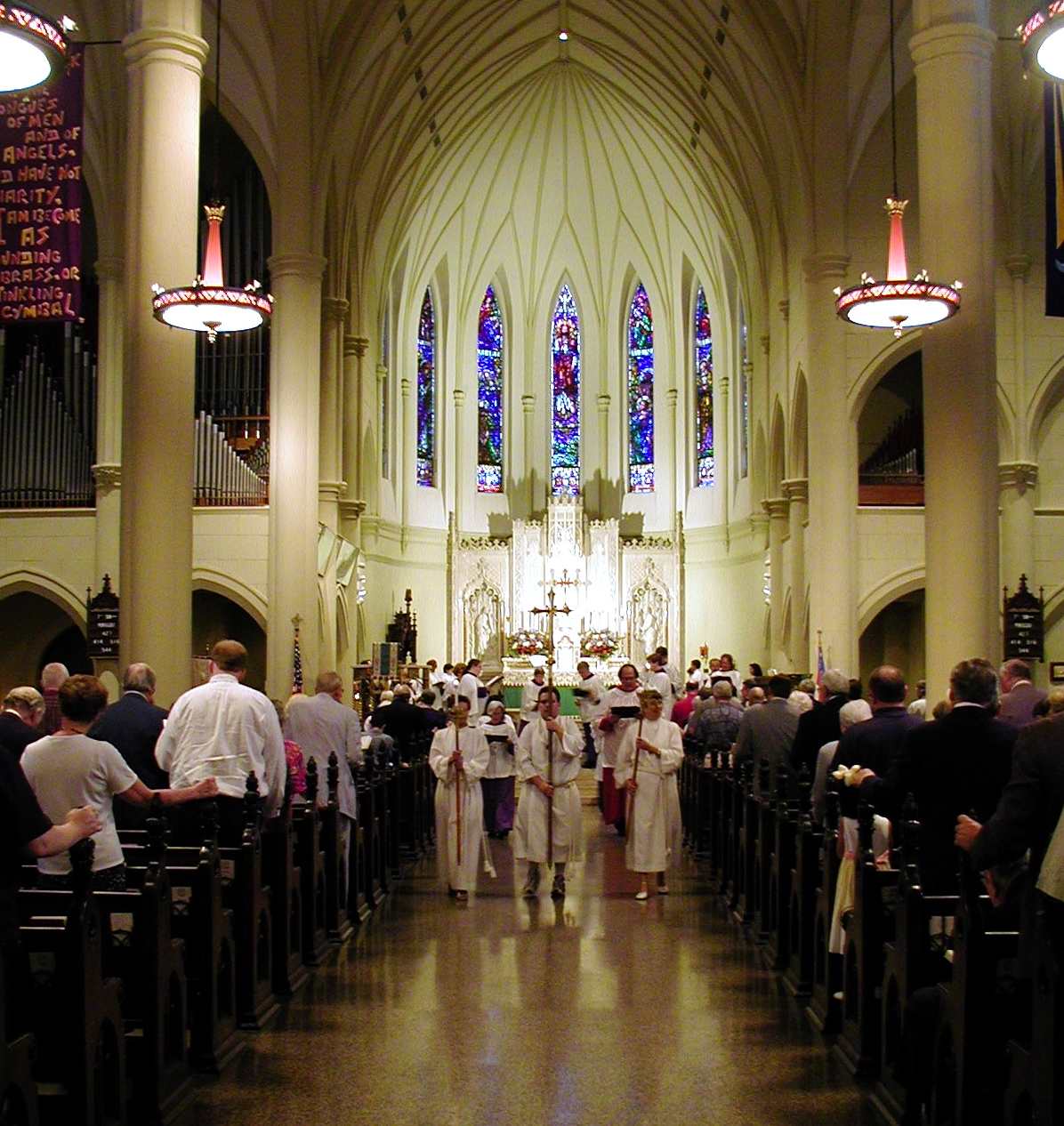
A procession in St. Mary's Episcopal Cathedral, Memphis, Tennessee, in 2002

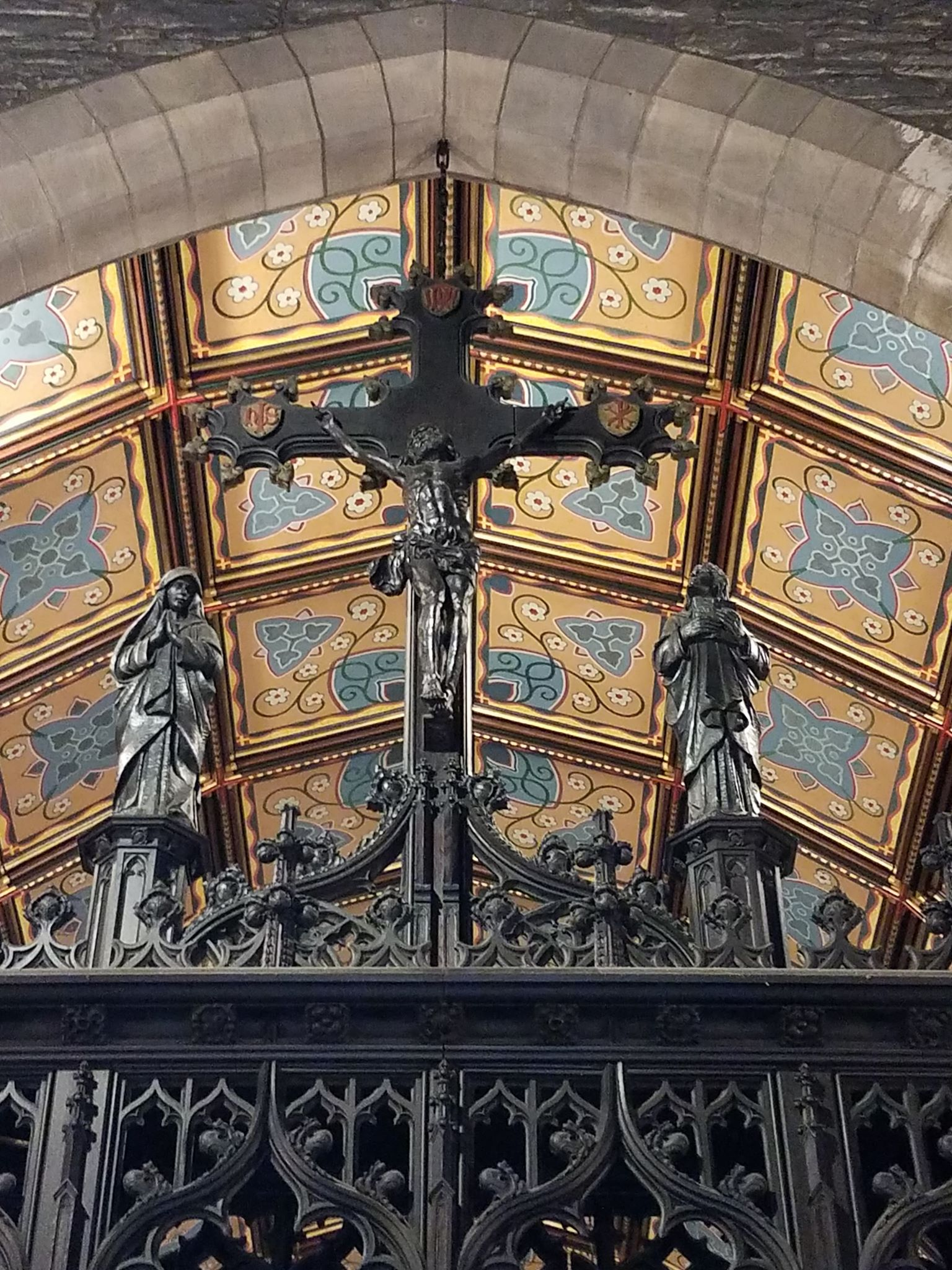
Rood screen and chancel ceiling at the Anglo-Catholic Church of the Good Shepherd in Rosemont, Pennsylvania

Worship according to the Book of Common Prayer (BCP) is central to the Episcopal Church's identity and its main source of unity. The current edition of the BCP was published in 1979 and is similar to other Anglican prayer books in use around the world. It contains most of the worship services (or liturgies) used in the Episcopal Church.

The Episcopal Church has a sacramental understanding of worship. The Episcopal catechism defines a sacrament as "an outward and visible sign of an inward and spiritual grace given to us". Episcopalians believe that sacraments are material things that God uses to act in human lives. The BCP identifies Baptism and the Eucharist as the "two great sacraments of the Gospel". Confirmation, ordination, holy matrimony, reconciliation of a penitent, and unction are identified as "sacramental rites". Private confession of sin is available in the Episcopal Church, though it is not as commonly practiced as in the Roman Catholic Church. This is in part due to the general confession provided for in Episcopal services.

The prayer book specifies that the Eucharist or Holy Communion is "the principal act of Christian worship on the Lord's Day". The service has two parts. The first is centered on Bible readings and preaching. At each service, four scripture passages are read from the Old Testament and the New Testament. The readings are organized in a three-year cycle during which much of the Bible will have been read in church. The second part of the service is centered on the Eucharist. The Episcopal Church teaches the real presence doctrine—that the bread and wine truly become the body and blood of Christ. However, it does not define how this happens, which allows for different views to coexist within the church. Generally, Episcopal churches have retained features such as the altar rail, the inclusion or exclusion of which does not elicit much controversy, but usually celebrate in the versus populum orientation.

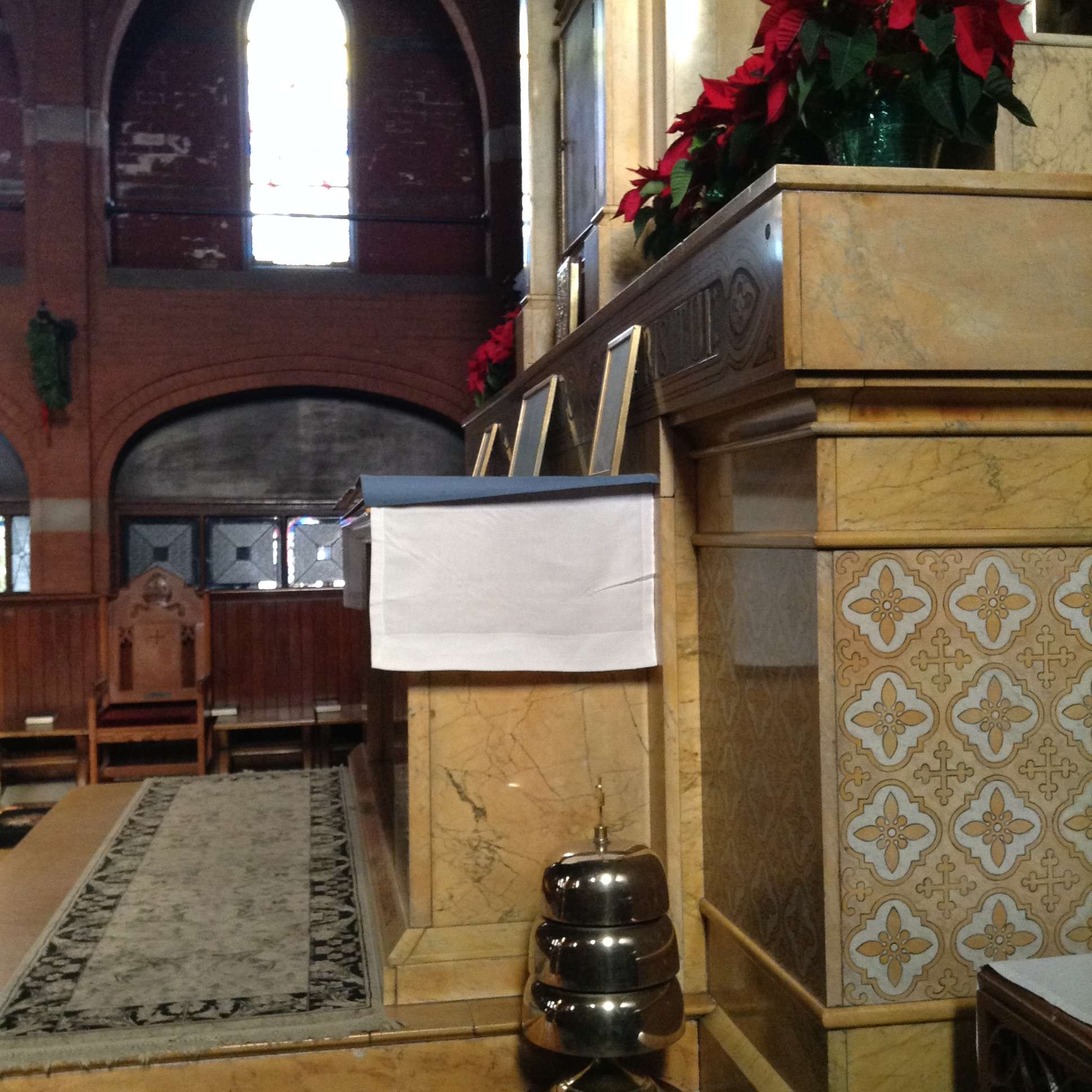
High altar of an Anglo-Catholic church ad orientem style

Often a congregation or a particular service will be referred to as Low Church or High Church. In theory:

- High Church, especially the very high Anglo-Catholic movement, is ritually inclined towards the use of incense, formal hymns, and a higher degree of ceremony such as ad orientem in relation to the priest and altar. In addition to clergy vesting in albs, stoles, and chasubles, the lay assistants may also be vested in cassock and surplice. The sung Eucharist tends to be emphasized in High Church congregations, with Anglo-Catholic congregations and celebrants using sung services almost exclusively. Marian devotion is sometimes seen in the Anglo-Catholic and some High Church parishes.
- Low Church is simpler and may incorporate other elements such as informal praise and worship music. "Low" parishes tend towards a more "traditional Protestant" outlook with its emphasis of Biblical revelation over symbolism. Some "low" parishes even subscribe to traditional Evangelical theology (see Evangelical Anglicanism). The spoken Eucharist tends to be emphasized in Low Church congregations. Altar rails may be omitted in this type.
- Broad Church indicates a middle ground. These parishes are the most common within the Episcopal Church. However, unlike the Anglican Church in England, most Episcopal "broad church" parishes make use of a liturgy that includes eucharistic vestments, chant, and a high view of the sacraments, even if the liturgy is not as solemn or lacks some of the other accoutrements typical of Anglo-Catholic parishes. Unlike many Roman Catholic churches, the altar rail has usually been retained and communion is usually served kneeling at the altar rail similar to a Tridentine Mass, because the Episcopal Church teaches, through its Book of Common Prayer, a theologically high view of the church and its sacraments, even if not all parishes carry this out liturgically.

The Book of Common Prayer also provides the Daily Offices of Morning and Evening Prayer. The daily offices can be said by lay people at home.

The veneration of saints in the Episcopal Church is a continuation of an ancient tradition from the early church which honors important people of the Christian faith. The usage of the term "saint" is similar to Roman Catholic and Orthodox traditions. There are explicit references in the 1979 Book of Common Prayer to invoking the aid of the prophets, patriarchs, saints, martyrs and the Virgin Mary as in an optional prayer in the committal at a funeral, p. 504. In general Anglicans pray with the saints in their fellowship, not to them, although their intercessions may be requested. Those inclined to the Anglo-Catholic traditions may explicitly invoke saints as intercessors in prayer. The 1979 edition contains a provision for the use of "traditional" (Elizabethan) language under various circumstances not directly provided for in the book.

== Belief and practice ==
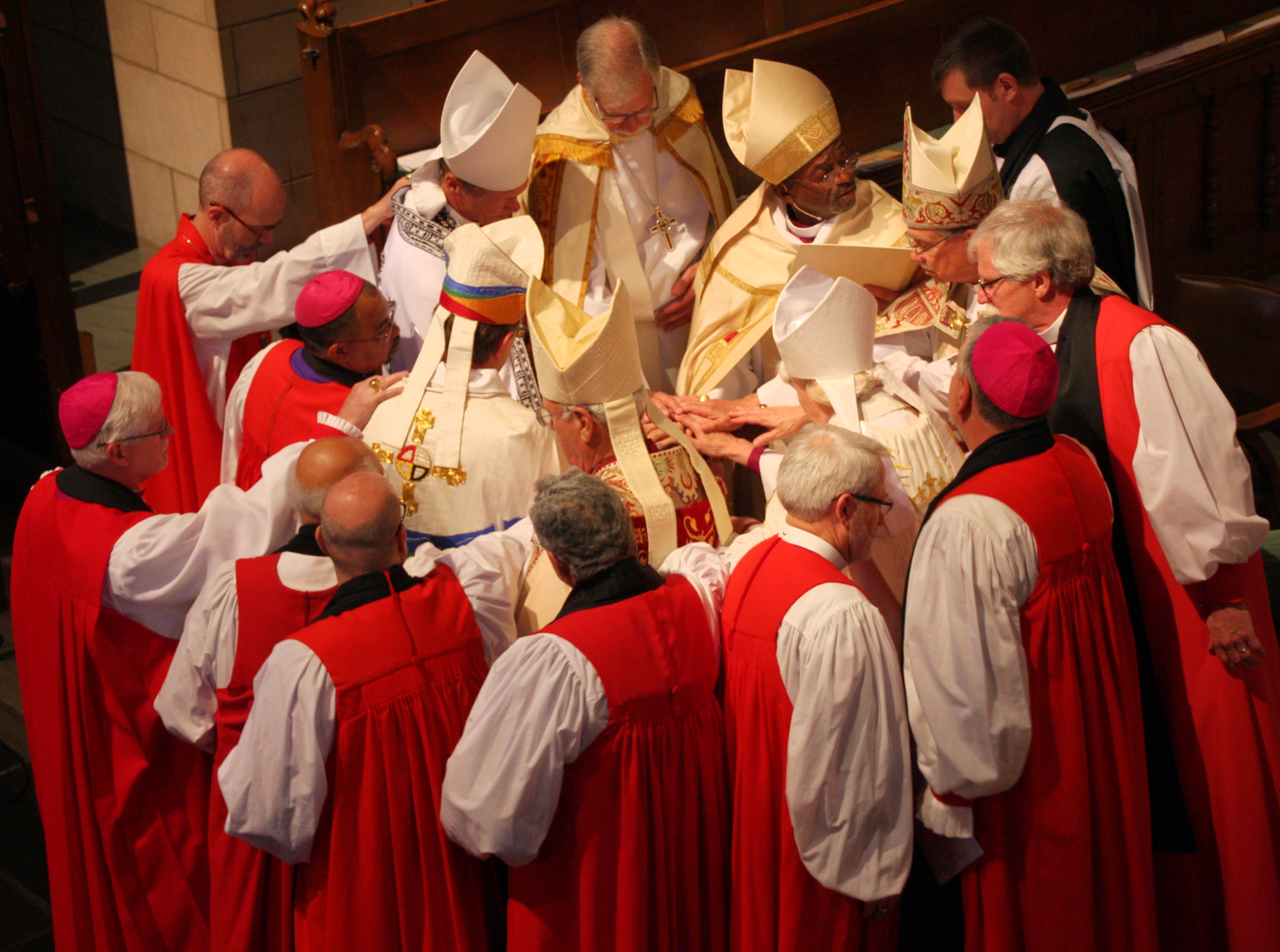
Episcopal consecration of the 8th bishop of Northern Indiana in 2016 by the laying on of hands

At the center of Episcopal belief and practice are the life, teachings and Resurrection of Jesus Christ. The doctrine of the Episcopal Church is found in the canon of scripture as understood in the Apostles' and Nicene creeds and in the sacramental rites, the ordinal and catechism of the Book of Common Prayer. Some of these teachings include:

- Belief that human beings "are part of God's creation, made in the image of God," and are therefore "free to make choices: to love, to reason, and to live in harmony with creation and with God."
- Belief that sin, defined as "the seeking of our own will instead of the will of God," has corrupted human nature, "thus distorting our relationship with God, with other people, and with all creation," resulting in death.
- Belief that "sin has power over us because we lose our liberty when our relationship with God is distorted," and that redemption is any act of God which "sets us free from the power of sin, evil, and death."
- The doctrines of the Incarnation and Resurrection of Jesus Christ; Jesus Christ is fully human and fully God.
- Jesus provides forgiveness of sin and the way of eternal life for those who believe and are baptized.
- The Trinity: God the Father, God the Son (Jesus Christ), and God the Holy Spirit are one God in three distinct persons, collectively called the Holy Trinity ("three and yet one").
- The Holy Scriptures, commonly called the Bible, consist of the Old Testament and the New Testament and were written by people "under the inspiration of the Holy Spirit." The Apocrypha are additional books that are used in Christian worship, but not for the formation of doctrine.
- The Bible contains "all things necessary to salvation" and nothing can be taught as pertaining to salvation which cannot be proven by scripture.
- Sacraments are "outward and visible signs of God's inward and spiritual grace." The two necessary sacraments are Baptism and Holy Communion (the latter is also called the Eucharist, the Lord's Supper, and the Mass). Infant baptism is practiced and encouraged. Holy Communion is open to all persons baptized in any Christian denomination.
- Other sacraments are confirmation, ordination, marriage, confession, and unction. Regarding these other sacraments the Book of Common Prayer states "Although they are means of grace, they are not necessary for all persons the same way that Baptism and the Eucharist are."
- A general belief in an afterlife of Heaven and Hell. Heaven is defined as the resurrection of the faithful to eternal life in the presence of God. Hell is defined as "eternal death" due to a willful rejection of God.
- Emphasis on the contents of the Sermon on the Mount and on living out the Great Commandment to love God and to love one's neighbor fully.
- Belief in an episcopal form of church government and in the offices and ministries of the early church, namely the threefold order of bishops, priests and deacons; both men and women are eligible for ordination to the clergy. Clergy are permitted to marry.
- Apostolic Succession: the belief that the Episcopal and wider Anglican bishops continue the apostolic tradition of the ancient church as spiritual heirs to the Twelve Apostles of Jesus Christ.
- Strong emphasis on prayer with specific reverence for the Lord's Prayer both in its original form and as a model for all prayer; principal kinds of prayer include adoration, praise, thanksgiving, penitence, oblation, intercession, and petition.
- Observance of the ancient Church Year (Advent, Christmas, Easter, Lent, etc.) and the celebration of holy days dedicated to saints.
- Belief that grace is "God's favor toward us, unearned and undeserved," by which God "forgives our sins, enlightens our minds, stirs our hearts, and strengthens our wills," and is continually conferred to Christians through the sacraments, prayer, and worship.

The full catechism is included in the Book of Common Prayer and is posted on the Episcopal website.

In practice, not all Episcopalians hold all of these beliefs, but ordained clergy are required to "solemnly engage to conform" to this doctrine. The Episcopal Church follows the via media or "middle way" between Protestant and Roman Catholic doctrine and practices: that is both Catholic and Reformed. Although many Episcopalians identify with this concept, those whose convictions lean toward either evangelical Anglicanism or Anglo-Catholicism may not.

A broad spectrum of theological views is represented within the Episcopal Church. Some Episcopal members or theologians hold evangelical positions, affirming the authority of scripture over all. The Episcopal Church website glossary defines the sources of authority as a balance between scripture, tradition, and reason. These three are characterized as a "three-legged stool" which will topple if any one overbalances the other. It also notes:

The Anglican balancing of the sources of authority has been criticized as clumsy or "muddy." It has been associated with the Anglican affinity for seeking the mean between extremes and living the via media. It has also been associated with the Anglican willingness to tolerate and comprehend opposing viewpoints instead of imposing tests of orthodoxy or resorting to heresy trials.

This balance of scripture, tradition and reason is traced to the work of Richard Hooker, a 16th-century apologist. In Hooker's model, scripture is the primary means of arriving at doctrine and things stated plainly in scripture are accepted as true. Issues that are ambiguous are determined by tradition, which is checked by reason. Noting the role of personal experience in Christian life, some Episcopalians have advocated following the example of the Wesleyan Quadrilateral of Methodist theology by thinking in terms of a "Fourth Leg" of "experience". This understanding is highly dependent on the work of Friedrich Schleiermacher.

A public example of this struggle between different Christian positions in the church has been the 2003 consecration of Gene Robinson, an openly gay man living with a long-term partner. The acceptance/rejection of his consecration is motivated by different views on the understanding of scripture. This struggle has some members concerned that the church may not continue its relationship with the larger Anglican Church. Others, however, view this pluralism as an asset, allowing a place for both sides to balance each other.

Comedian and Episcopalian Robin Williams once described the Episcopal faith (and, in a performance in London, specifically the Church of England) as "Catholic Lite – same rituals, half the guilt".

=== Social positions ===
==== Abortion ====
The Episcopal Church affirms that human life is sacred "from inception until death" and opposes elective abortion. As such, the Episcopal Church condemns the use of abortion as a method of birth control, gender selection, family planning, or for "any reason of convenience". The Church acknowledges the right of women to choose to undergo the procedure "only in extreme situations". It has stated that laws prohibiting abortions fail to address the social conditions which give rise to them. The 1994 resolution establishing the Episcopal Church's position gave "unequivocal opposition to any legislative, executive or judicial action on the part of local, state or national governments that abridges the right of a woman to reach an informed decision about the termination of pregnancy or that would limit the access of a woman to safe means of acting on her decision." In 2022, the 80th General Convention of the Episcopal Church approved a resolution calling for the protection of "abortion services and birth control with no restriction on movement, autonomy, type, or timing."

==== Capital punishment ====
Holding that human life is sacred, the Episcopal Church is opposed to capital punishment. At the 1958 General Convention, Episcopal bishops issued a public statement against the death penalty, a position which has since been reaffirmed.

==== Climate change ====
The Episcopal Church website's Creation Care Glossary of Terms defines climate change as a "crisis" consisting of "severe problems that arise as human activity increases the level of carbon dioxide and other heat-trapping gases in the atmosphere, and the world's average global temperature soars", a statement which places the church's stance on climate change in line with global scientific consensus on the matter. According to the church's website glossary, the climate crisis is one of "triple urgency" resulting from "the intersection of climate change, poverty and inequality, and biodiversity loss." The church's range of advocacy areas with respect to the environment include public support for net carbon neutrality, environmental justice, opposition to environmental racism, support for renewable energy and for setting and meeting sustainability goals, and support for workers, communities, and economies as they undergo a "just transition" toward eco-friendly policies.

==== Economic issues ====
In 1991, the church's general convention recommended parity in pay and benefits between clergy and lay employees in equivalent positions. Several times between 1979 and 2003, the convention expressed concern over affordable housing and supported work to provide affordable housing. In 1982 and 1997, the convention reaffirmed the church's commitment to eradicating poverty and malnutrition, and challenged parishes to increase ministries to the poor.

The convention urged the church in 1997 and 2000 to promote living wages for all. In 2003, the convention urged U.S. legislators to raise the national minimum wage, and to establish a living wage with health benefits as the national standard.

==== Euthanasia ====
The Episcopal Church disapproves of assisted suicide and other forms of euthanasia, but does teach that it is permissible to withdraw medical treatment, such as artificial nutrition and hydration, when the burden of such treatment outweighs its benefits to an individual.

==== Evolution ====
The Episcopal Church accepts the empirical findings of biology and does not consider the theory of evolution to be in conflict with its understanding of Holy Scripture in light of reason. In 1982, the Episcopal Church passed a resolution to "affirm its belief in the glorious ability of God to create in any manner, and in this affirmation reject the rigid dogmatism of the 'Creationist' movement." The church has also expressed skepticism toward the intelligent design movement.

==== Healthcare ====
In 2020, the Episcopal Church stated that it supported universal healthcare.

==== Marriage equality, gender, and sexuality ====
The Episcopal Church opposes laws in society which discriminate against individuals because of their sex, sexual orientation, or gender expression. The Episcopal Church enforces this policy of non-discrimination; women are ordained to all levels of ministry and church leadership. The church maintains an anti-sexism taskforce. Similarly, openly gay, lesbian, bisexual, and transgender individuals are eligible to be ordained. The Episcopal Church affirms that marriage is the historic Christian standard for sexual intimacy between two people but does encourage clergy and laity to maintain ministry and dialogue with "the growing number of persons entering into sexually intimate relationships other than marriage."

At its 2015 triennial general convention, the church adopted "canonical and liturgical changes to provide marriage equality for Episcopalians". The "two new marriage rites" contain language that allows "them to be used by same-sex or opposite-sex couples". The blessing of same-sex relationships is not uniform throughout the Episcopal Church. Following the 2015 general convention, bishops were able to determine whether churches and priests within their dioceses were permitted to use the new liturgies. Bishops who did not permit their use were to connect same-sex couples to a diocese where the liturgies were allowed. However, following the 2018 general convention, resolution B012 was amended to "make provision for all couples asking to be married in this church to have access to these liturgies". This effectively granted all churches and clergy, with or without the support of their bishop, the ability to perform same-sex marriages. They may, however, refuse to do so. The church also opposes any state or federal constitutional amendments designed to prohibit the marriages of same-sex couples.

In 2022, the 80th General Convention of the Episcopal Church, affirmed its position in favor of access to gender affirming care, including all forms of medical transition for people of any age, as a part of the Baptismal call to "respect the dignity of every human being."

==== Racial equality ====
In 1861, John Henry Hopkins wrote a pamphlet entitled, A Scriptural, Ecclesiastical, and Historical View of Slavery, attempting to give a view of slavery from his interpretation of the New Testament: he argued that slavery was not a sin per se. Rather, Hopkins argued that slavery was an institution that was objectionable and should be abrogated by agreement, not by war. Bishop Hopkins' Letter on Slavery Ripped Up and his Misuse of the Sacred Scriptures Exposed, written by G.W. Hyer in 1863, opposed the points mentioned in Hopkins' pamphlet and revealed a startling divide in the Episcopal Church, as in other American churches, over the issue of slavery. It was not, however, strong enough to split the church into Northern and Southern wings even after the war, as many other denominations did. And though the church did divide into two wings during the war, Hopkins was active in re-uniting them in 1865.

The Social Gospel movement within American Christianity was a mainstay of racial justice and reconciliation activism amongst Episcopal clergy and laity alike throughout in the nineteenth and early to mid-twentieth century, it stressed a view of sin as being "more than individual" and "to be the consequence of forces of evil in human society so that salvation must involve the redemption of the social order as well as the redemption of the individual."

In 1991, the General Convention declared "the practice of racism is sin", and in 2006, a unanimous House of Bishops endorsed Resolution A123 apologizing for complicity in the institution of slavery, and silence over "Jim Crow" laws, segregation, and racial discrimination. In 2018, following the white nationalist rally in Charlottesville, then-Presiding Bishop Michael B. Curry said that "the stain of bigotry has once again covered our land" and called on Episcopalians to choose "organized love intent on creating God's beloved community on Earth" rather than hate.

In April 2021, the Episcopal Church released the findings of a racial justice audit after three years of study, it cited nine areas of needed improvement within the church regarding systemic racism.

In May 2025, the Episcopal Church announced that they would be terminating their participation in the United States Refugee Admissions Program, as they were morally opposed to resettling white Afrikaners that the Donald Trump administration was bringing into the country.

==== Vaccinations ====
The Episcopal Church "recognizes no claim of theological or religious exemption from vaccination for our members and reiterates the spirit of General Convention policies that Episcopalians should seek the counsel of experienced medical professionals, scientific research, and epidemiological evidence", while similarly condemning the "spreading of fraudulent research that suggested vaccines might cause harm." In a similar vein, the church has expressed "grave concern and sorrow for the recent rise in easily preventable diseases due to anti-vaccination movements which have harmed thousands of children and adults." The Episcopal Church has endorsed stronger government mandates for vaccinations and has characterized the choice to be inoculated as "a duty not only to our own selves and families but to our communities", while describing the choice to not vaccinate, when it is medically safe to do so, as a decision which "threatens the lives of others."

== Agencies and programs ==
The Society for the Increase of the Ministry (SIM) is the only organization raising funds on a national basis for Episcopal seminarian support. SIM's founding purpose in 1857 – "to find suitable persons for the Episcopal ministry and aid them in acquiring a thorough education". SIM has awarded scholarships to qualified full-time seminary students.

Episcopal Relief & Development is the international relief and development agency of the Episcopal Church in the United States. It helps to rebuild after disasters and aims to empower people by offering lasting solutions that fight poverty, hunger and disease. Episcopal Relief and Development programs focus on alleviating hunger, improving food supply, creating economic opportunities, strengthening communities, promoting health, fighting disease, responding to disasters, and rebuilding communities.

There are about 60 trust funds administered by the Episcopal Church which offer scholarships to young people affiliated with the church. Qualifying considerations often relate to historical missionary work of the church among Native Americans and African-Americans, as well as work in China and other foreign missions. There are special programs for both Native Americans and African-Americans interested in training for the ministry.

There are three historical societies of American Episcopalianism: Historical Society of the Episcopal Church, the National Episcopal Historians and Archivists (NEHA), and the Episcopal Women's History Project.

Church Publishing Incorporated (Church Publishing Inc., CPI) began as the Church Hymnal Corporation in 1918, dedicated initially to publishing a single work, The Hymnal 1918, which still remains in print. It is the official publisher for the General Convention of the Episcopal Church in the United States. Imprints include Church Publishing, Morehouse Publishing (independently founded in 1884) and Seabury Books (the "trade" imprint).

== Ecumenical relations ==
=== Full communion ===
Under the leadership of Lutheran bishop Jesper Swedberg, parishes in colonial America that belonged to the Evangelical Lutheran Church of Sweden established ecumenical dialogue that resulted in altar and pulpit fellowship with the Episcopal Church in the 1700s, which led to a merger of all of the Swedish Lutheran churches there into the Episcopal Church by 1846. The Episcopal Church entered into a full communion agreement with the Church of Sweden at its General Convention in Salt Lake City on June 28, 2015.

Like the other churches of the Anglican Communion, the Episcopal Church has entered into full communion with the Old Catholic Churches of the Union of Utrecht, the Philippine Independent Church, and the Mar Thoma Syrian Church of Malabar. The Episcopal Church is also in a relationship of full communion with the Evangelical Lutheran Church in America and the Northern and Southern Provinces of the Moravian Church in America.

In 2006 a relation of interim Eucharistic sharing was inaugurated with the United Methodist Church, a step that may ultimately lead to full communion. In 2024, the United Methodist Church's General Conference approved full communion with the Episcopal Church, effective upon mutual approval by the General Convention, which is scheduled for as early as 2027.

In 2025, the Episcopal Church entered into full communion with the Evangelical Lutheran Church in Bavaria. The Evangelical Lutheran Church in Bavaria is a member church of the Evangelical Lutheran Church in Germany, a federation of 20 independent Christian denominations in Germany. This agreement was authorized by the Evangelical Lutheran Church in Bavaria's synod in 2022 and by the Episcopal Church's General Convention in 2024. The full communion agreement is titled "Sharing the Gifts of Communion (Augsburg Agreement)."

=== Other ecumenical relations ===
The Episcopal Church maintains ecumenical dialogues with the United Methodist Church, the Presbyterian Church (USA) and the Moravian Church in America, and participates in pan-Anglican dialogues with the Oriental Orthodox Churches, the World Alliance of Reformed Churches, and the Roman Catholic Church.

Historically Anglican churches have had strong ecumenical ties with the Eastern Orthodox Churches. In 1922, the Ecumenical Patriarchate of Constantinople recognized Anglican Holy Orders as having "the same validity" as the Roman Catholic, Old Catholic, and Oriental Orthodox churches. The Episcopal Church particularly with the Russian Orthodox Church, but relations in more recent years have been strained by the ordination of women and the consecration of Gene Robinson, an openly homosexual priest, to the episcopate. A former relation of full communion with the Polish National Catholic Church (once a part of the Union of Utrecht) was broken off by the PNCC in 1976 over the ordination of women.

The Episcopal Church was a founding member of the Consultation on Church Union and participates in its successor, Churches Uniting in Christ. The Episcopal Church is a founding member of the National Council of Churches, the World Council of Churches, and the new Christian Churches Together in the USA. Dioceses and parishes are frequently members of local ecumenical councils as well.

== See also ==
- Christianity in the United States
- Episcopal Youth Community
- Anglican Religious Orders
- Historical List of bishops of the Episcopal Church in the United States of America
- List of colleges and seminaries affiliated with the Episcopal Church
- List of Episcopal bishops of the United States
- List of the Episcopal cathedrals of the United States
- Protestantism in the United States
