= HSEC =

HSEC may refer to:

- Health, Safety, Environment & Communities
- Historical Society of the Episcopal Church
