= Church Historical Society =

Church Historical Society may refer to

- Historical Society of the Episcopal Church, United States; formerly named the Church Historical Society
- Church Historical Society, associated with the Society for Promoting Christian Knowledge, England
