= Anglican and Episcopal History =

- Discipline: Episcopal Church history, Anglican history
- Language: English
- Edited by: Edward Bond

Publication details
- Former name: Historical Magazine of the Protestant Episcopal Church
- History: 1932–present
- Publisher: Historical Society of the Episcopal Church (United States)
- Frequency: Quarterly

Standard abbreviations
- ISO 4: Angl. Episcop. Hist.

Indexing
- ISSN: 0896-8039
- JSTOR: 08968039

Links
- Journal homepage

Anglican and Episcopal History is a peer-reviewed academic journal published quarterly (March, June, September, and December) by the Historical Society of the Episcopal Church.

== History ==
Established in 1932 as the Historical Magazine of the Protestant Episcopal Church and published by the Church Historical Society, the predecessor organization of the Historical Society of the Episcopal Church (which also gave rise to the National Episcopal Historians and Archivists (NEHA)), it was renamed with the March 1987 issue (vol. LVI, no. 1).

In 2007, Anglican and Episcopal History had a circulation of approximately 750 copies. The journal began electronic publication in December 2018, and past issues are available on JSTOR.

Anglican and Episcopal History is a member of the Conference of Historical Journals.

== Lists of editors ==
Editors in Chief

- E. Clowes Chorley, 1932–1949
- Walter Herbert Stowe, 1950–1961
- Lawrence L. Brown, 1962–1977
- John F. Woolverton, 1978–2007
- Edward L. Bond, 2007-June 2021
- Sheryl Kujawa-Holbrook, June 2021 – present

Book Review Editors

- William A. Clebsch, 1961–1966
- Frank E. Sugeno, 1967–1976
- J. Carleton Hayden, 1976–1984
- J. Barrett Miller, 1984-?
- James E. Bradley, ?-2010
- Sheryl Kujawa-Holbrook, 2010–present

Church Review Editor

- David L. Holmes, 1987–2003
- Alan L. Hayes, 2003–2011
- J. Barrington Bates, 2011–present

== Sources ==
- Anglican & Episcopal History, (December 2007), vol. 76, no. 4.
