= Cameron Partridge =

American Episcopal priest, chaplain and transgender activist

Cameron Partridge (born 1973) is an American Episcopal priest, chaplain, and a transgender activist. He was the first transgender priest to preach at the National Cathedral in Washington, D.C.

He was born in Berkeley, California, in 1973. Prior to transitioning, he attended Bryn Mawr College as an undergraduate, graduating in 1995. He later enrolled in the Master of Divinity degree program at Harvard Divinity School. While there, he wrestled with gender identity, and made the decision both to transition and to pursue ordination as an Episcopal priest. He notified his bishop, the Right Reverend M. Thomas Shaw, that he was transitioning, and was given support and approval to proceed in the ordination process in the Episcopal Diocese of Massachusetts. He was ordained in 2005. He completed a Doctor in Theology at Harvard Divinity School in 2008. At that time, Partridge served as a parish minister at St. Luke's and St. Margaret's Episcopal church in Allston/Brighton. In 2011, he became the first openly transgender chaplain at Boston University, serving as the Episcopal chaplain on campus. He also lectured at Harvard Divinity School.

Partridge has been an outspoken advocate for the full inclusion of queer and transgender people in the Episcopal Church and within Christianity more broadly. Partridge has regularly participated in the Transgender Day of Remembrance held annually in the Boston area. He advocated for the Episcopal Church to include gender identity and expression as part of their non-discrimination policies, as part of a grassroots effort that led to the successful change in canon law in 2012. On June 22, 2014, Partridge was the guest preacher at the National Cathedral in Washington, D.C., at a Sunday morning service in celebration of Pride month. He was the first transgender priest to preach at the cathedral.
