= National Episcopal Historians and Archivists =

Organization

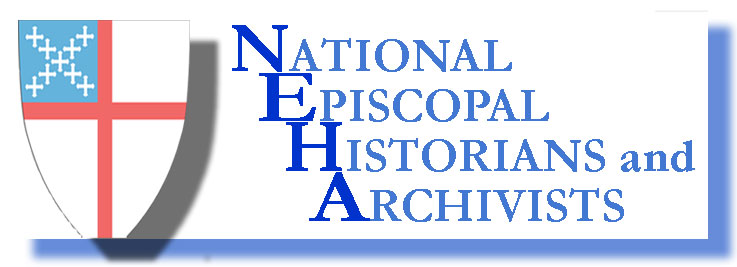
Logo of the National Episcopal Historians and Archivists website

The National Episcopal Historians and Archivists (NEHA) is an organization that encourages every congregation, diocese, and organization in the Episcopal Church in the United States of America to collect, preserve and organize its records and share its history. It has EIN 23-3014512 as a 501(c)(3) Public Charity.

== Vision ==
NEHA will fulfill its vision to support and encourage congregations, dioceses, and organizations through:

- Publications in print and electronic media.
- Annual conferences and networking opportunities.
- Training workshops and classes.

== History ==
NEHA began in 1961 as an outgrowth of the Church Historical Society to answer the needs of diocesan officials and others who felt attention should be given to nurturing congregational, diocesan, and institutional historians as well as archivists and registrars.

Since its first meeting at the University of the South August 18–19, 1961, NEHA has provided a forum for exchanging ideas and giving mutual support. Under the leadership of Dr. Arthur Ben Chitty, the association launched a newsletter that later became The Historiographer. Through this communication tool, NEHA has come to define its role as an archival and historical professional society for those who participate in preserving and exploring the historical dimensions of the Episcopal Church.

When founded in 1961, the organization was called the Association of Episcopal Historiographers. At an annual meeting in 1980, it was decided to include archivists, registrars, and parish historians and in 1982 the name was changed to the National Episcopal Historians' Association. Then in 1994, the name was changed to the current National Episcopal Historians and Archivists. In 1999, the Historical Society of the Episcopal Church became a co-sponsor of The Historiographer.

== Members ==
Members of NEHA are encouraged:

- To participate in developing new projects.
- To continue to publish guides on how to document and disseminate information on congregational history.
- To establish a national resource network of historiographical research and information sharing.
- To work with the Archives of the Episcopal Church in creating a national union catalog of diocesan and congregational archival holdings.
- To hold a variety of regional workshops and seminars on preserving, exhibiting, and writing local church history.

== Activities ==
- An annual conference offering practical insights into the recording, preservation, and writing of the institutional history of the Episcopal Church. Recent conference sites include: St. Augustine, Las Cruces, Houston, Baltimore, Chicago, Honolulu, Memphis, Mobile, and Toronto.
- Triennial conferences of archivists and historians are planned in cooperation with the Historical Society of the Episcopal Church and the Episcopal Women’s History Project. The conference in 2001 included the Canadian Church Historical Society, and in 2004, it included the archivists and historians of the Evangelical Lutheran Church in America.
- Promotion of modern archival management and establishment of standards for preservation and access.
- Production and primary distribution of the Historic Episcopal Churches Engagement Calendar, and other publications. Proceeds are used to conduct regional educational workshops and programs for archivists and historians nationwide.
