= A Scriptural, Ecclesiastical, and Historical View of Slavery =

A Scriptural, Ecclesiastical, and Historical View of Slavery was a pamphlet written in 1861 by John Henry Hopkins, and addressed to Bishop Alonzo Potter of Pennsylvania.

The pamphlet claimed that the Bible did not forbid slavery, and although some might find it reprehensible, it cannot be deemed a sin. Hopkins concedes that slavery could be deemed a “physical evil” but the strongly opposes the idea that it is a “moral evil”, saying “I condemn the institution of Slavery ... But as a Christian I am compelled to submit my weak and erring intellect to the almighty”. Hopkins also uses his claim on a political basis, arguing that the Civil War was started by “ultra abolitionists”, who preached against the word of God and turned the Union against the South.

== Contents of the pamphlet ==
Old Testament

In his pamphlet Hopkins explores the Bible and systematically uses different Bible stories from the Old Testaments to prove his claim. He consistently interprets the word servant in the Bible to mean slave and thus cites the numerous instances in which the Bible talks about servants as evidence towards his claim. Some of the Bible stories that he uses are:

- The Curse of Canaan, Genesis 9:25
- Abraham and Hagar, Genesis 16:9
- The Ten Commandments
- The Jewish Laws of Servitude

New Testament

He also uses the teachings of Jesus to support his claim. He drops the systematic approach he used for the Old Testament, and begins to jump around between gospels. In this section Hopkins concludes that, since Jesus did not repeal the laws pertaining to slavery, then he did not oppose them. Since slavery was in full effect during Jesus’ life, says Hopkins, his disregard for the subject entirely must signify his approval.

== Controversy ==
A pamphlet entitled Bishop Hopkins Letter on Slavery Ripped Up and his Misuse of the Sacred Scriptures Exposed was written by an anonymous clergyman in 1863. In this pamphlet the author methodically opposes all of Hopkins’ points and either gives more evidence to show how he was wrong or gives another interpretation of the Hopkins’ evidence to prove the contrary. This opposition to Hopkins' pamphlet shows the intense divide in the Episcopal Church over the issue of slavery. Throughout the Civil War, the Church remained unclear on its official stance on slavery, and these two opposing pamphlets are a prime example of the two duelling factions.

== Full text ==
A Scriptural, Ecclesiastical, and Historical View of Slavery - Google Books
