= Historical Society of the Episcopal Church =

Religious society in Philadelphia

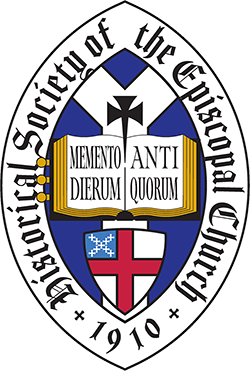
Seal of the Historical Society of the Episcopal Church

The Historical Society of the Episcopal Church (HSEC), formerly the Church Historical Society, was founded in Philadelphia in 1910. This voluntary society includes scholars, writers, teachers, ministers as well as others interested in its goals and objectives. It publishes the quarterly academic journal Anglican & Episcopal History and co-publishes a newsletter, The Historiographer with the National Episcopal Historians and Archivists (NEHA) and the Episcopal Women's History Project Episcopal Womens History project. The offices are based in Appleton, Wisconsin.

It has EIN 74-1277648 as a 501(c)(3) Public Charity; in 2024 it claimed $134,997 in total revenue and $1,943,602 in total assets.

== Purposes ==
HSEC has three objectives:

1. To promote preservation of the historical heritage of the Protestant Episcopal Church in the United States and its antecedents.
2. To publish articles of interest to the historical heritage of the Protestant Episcopal Church in the United States and its antecedents.
3. To cooperate with others who support the first objective.

HSEC holds an annual meeting which includes a variety of activities. John H. Hopkins, bishop of the Diocese of Vermont, addressed the first meeting of the Society.

It gives grants and awards to promote its objectives, participates in major projects, and partners with Archives of the Episcopal Church, the National Episcopal Historians and Archivists (NEHA), the Episcopal Women's History Project (EWHP), and the office of the Historiographer of the Episcopal Church. With NEHA and EWHP it co-sponsors a triennial conference of all three organizations.

== African American Episcopal Historical Collection ==
In 2003, the society established the African American Episcopal Historical Collection (AAEHC), a joint venture with the Virginia Theological Seminary Archives. The collection documents the experiences of African American Episcopalians through oral histories, personal papers, documents, institutional records, and photographs.

Members of the society began to discuss the creation of the AAEHC in the 1990s, and began gathering materials for the collection in 2000. In December 2002, the HSEC and the Virginia Theological Seminary agreed jointly to sponsor the AAEHC. The collection was formally dedicated in February 2005, and donations of appropriate archival materials continue to be received. Since 2014, the HSEC has made travel grants available for individuals wishing to use the collection for research.
