= Charles Brent =

American Episcopal bishop and Army chaplain

The Right Reverend Charles Henry Brent D.D., LL.D.
- 4th Bishop of Western New York
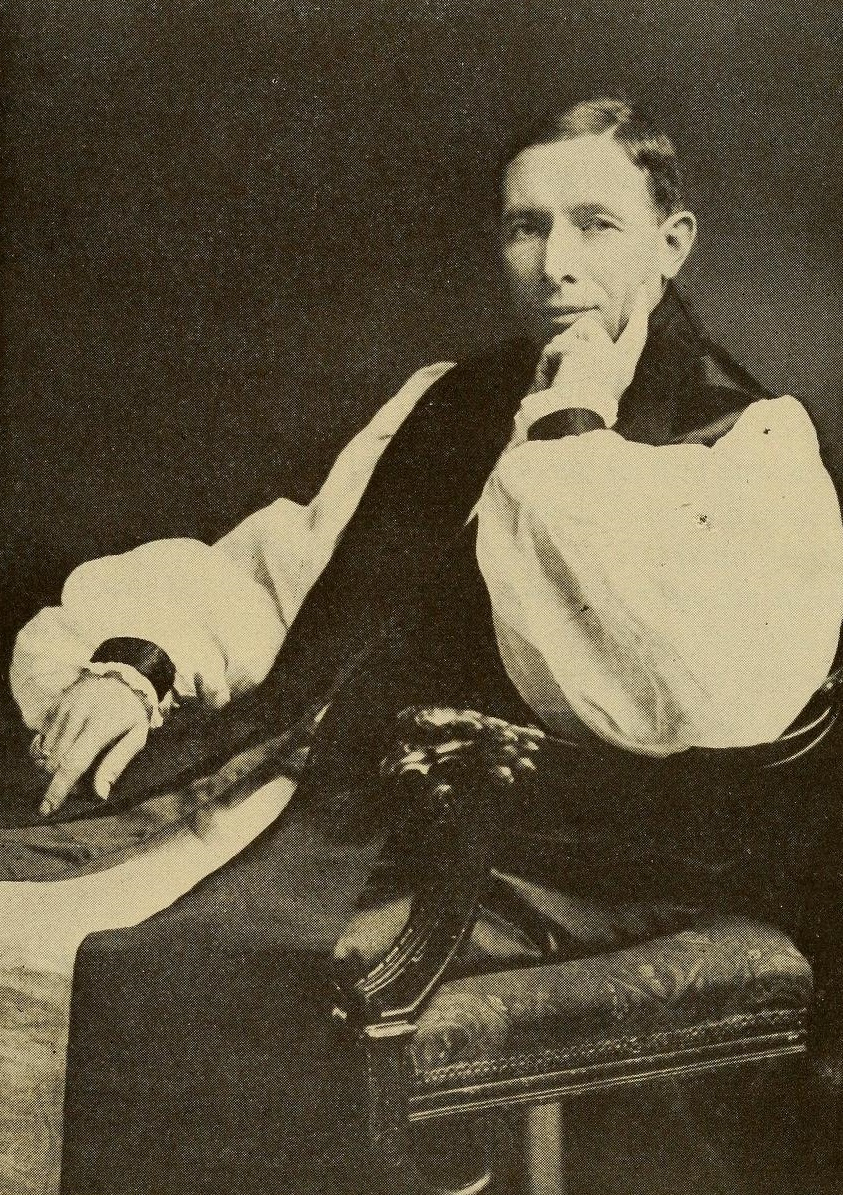
- Church: Episcopal Church
- Diocese: Western New York
- Elected: January 18, 1918
- In office: 1919–1929
- Predecessor: William D. Walker
- Successor: David L. Ferris
- Previous post: Bishop of the Missionary District of the Philippine Islands (1901–1918)

Orders
- Ordination: March 6, 1887 by Arthur Sweatman
- Consecration: December 19, 1901 by William Croswell Doane

Personal details
- Born: April 9, 1862 Newcastle, Ontario, Canada
- Died: March 27, 1929 (aged 66) Lausanne, Switzerland
- Buried: Bois-de-Vaux Cemetery, Switzerland
- Denomination: Anglican
- Parents: Henry Brent & Sophia Frances Cummings
- Education: Trinity College, Toronto

Sainthood
- Feast day: The Episcopal Church's Liturgical Calendar commemorates Brent on March 27. The Anglican Church of Canada commemorates Brent on March 27 as "Charles Henry Brent, Bishop of the Philippines, and of Western New York, 1929."

Charles Henry Brent (April 9, 1862 – March 27, 1929) was the Episcopal Church's first Missionary Bishop of the Philippine Islands (1902–1918); Chaplain General of the American Expeditionary Forces in World War I (1917–1918); and Bishop of the Episcopal Church's Diocese of Western New York (1918–1929). The historian and Episcopal minister Frederick Ward Kates characterised him as a "gallant, daring, and consecrated soldier and servant of Christ" who was "one of modern Christendom's foremost leaders, prophets, and seers."

Brent's suggestion led to the founding of the International Opium Commission in 1909 and the subsequent First International Opium Conference in 1912, which adopted the International Opium Convention – "the world's first international drug control treaty".

== Early life and education ==
Charles Henry Brent was born on April 9, 1862, in Newcastle, Ontario. He was the third of ten children of the Reverend Henry Brent, who was the Anglican rector in Newcastle for forty-two years, and Sophia Francis Brent. By his own account, Brent's childhood in the rural village was happy and secure.

=== Education ===
Brent was educated in Ontario. He planned his education to prepare him for the ordained ministry. First, Brent attended the town's public schools until 1880. Second, Brent's college preparation was done in 1880–1881 at Trinity College School in Port Hope, Ontario. (Note: Trinity College School had been founded in 1865 by The Reverend William A. Johnson as an attempt to recreate a classical Anglican "public school". James J. Halsema describes life at Trinity College School as Brent probably it: "Masters and boys followed a strenuous program that began at 6:30 a.m. and ended with an evening study hall from 7:30 to 9:00 p.m. Study of the classics, the Bible and theology was emphasized. Sports were cricket and rugby rather than baseball, the candy store was called a "tuck shop" and the student military drill association members swore red coats, for this was very much a part of the British Empire.") Third, he attended Trinity College, Toronto, where he graduated with a Bachelor of Arts degree in classical honors in 1884. Throughout his education, Brent was both "a gifted and apt scholar" and "a formidable athlete." After graduating from Trinity College, he returned to Port Hope where from 1884 to 1886 he both taught at Trinity College School and studied privately for ordination.

=== Ordination ===
From Brent's earliest memories he felt called to the ordained ministry. He once said, "I do not recall an instant of my life when I aspired to any vocation excepting that of the Ministry, but on one brief occasion when I faced the possibility of becoming a musician. As a boy at school the Ministry seemed to me the one vocation worth considering. ... Were I again on the threshold of life I would choose as I have chosen."

Brent was ordained a deacon on March 21, 1886, in the Anglican Diocese of Toronto in the Anglican Church of Canada in 1886. However, there were no openings for him in his diocese, so he looked for a position in the United States. In 1887, he was ordained to the priesthood on March 6, 1887. After that, he was called to his first ministerial position in Buffalo, New York.

== Ministry ==
Before being elected bishop, Brent had "pastorates" in Buffalo, New York, and Boston, Massachusetts. During that time he was naturalized as a United States citizen.

Throughout his ministry, Brent was "essentially a pastor with a prophetic vision." His biographer Eleanor Slater wrote that Brent "was born a poet; he made himself a prophet."

Brent was also "a popular preacher." His biographer Eleanor Slater wrote that Brent "gradually learned to be a great preacher. ... His eloquence was the eloquence of simplicity, of self-forgetfulness, of the inner compulsion to share his treasure."

=== Buffalo ===
In 1884, Brent accepted a position as curate and organist at St. John's Church, Buffalo in the Diocese of Western New York. He remained in that position until 1887.

In 1887, Brent was ordained to the priesthood on March 6 and accepted a position as a curate at St. Paul's Episcopal Church (now Cathedral) in Buffalo. He was assigned to St. Andrew's Mission Chapel in Buffalo. While at St. Andrew's, Brent placed candles on the altar, but the bishop of the diocese Arthur Coxe ordered him to remove them. As a result, Brent resigned and moved to Boston. Later, he explained his resignation: "I did not set such store by the candles as I did by my rights as a priest."

=== Boston ===
In 1887, Brent had met and been influenced by Father Hall, a member of the Society of St. John the Evangelist, an Anglican monastic order, often called the Cowley Fathers. Thus, when he resigned his St. Andrew's assignment, Brent moved to the Cowley monastery in Boston. The Cowley Fathers placed Brent in charge of St. Augustine's chapel which had been built to minister to African-Americans living in the West End of Boston.

Leaving monastery. Brent lived and worked with the Society of St. John the Evangelist from 1888 until 1891, but he never took monastic vows. It is likely that Brent would have taken his final vows and become a member of the order if a disagreement had not occurred between the Father Superior of the order in England and the Boston house. The disagreement had to do with the election of Phillips Brooks as Bishop of Massachusetts which was opposed by the Father Superior. The Father Superior's highhandedness led Brent to leave the order.

Time with Cowley Fathers was crucial. The years he spent with the Cowley Fathers (1888-1891) were crucial to Brent's spiritual formation. The monks taught him how to live "an ordered and disciplined spiritual life." These lessons were invaluable for his future ministry. Thirty-five years later, Brent reflected that the lessons he learned from the Cowley Fathers were "so sound and inspiring that I could covet it for every young priest." More specifically, he said that the "daily meditation was a severe and joyous task." Meditating on "the love of Jesus Christ, the application to modern life of principles by which He lived, and the overwhelming importance of the unseen, were instilled into my being in a manner and to a degree from which there is, thirty-five years later, no escape."

St. Stephen's: 1891–1901. After leaving the Cowley monastery, Brent's bishop Phillips Brooks appointed him to serve as assistant minister at what had been an abandoned church, St. Stephen's Church, Boston. St. Stephen's was in one of Boston's poorest neighborhoods, the South End of Boston. Brent ministered in St. Stephen's from 1891 until 1901. Under the leadership of Brent and the rector Father Henry Martyn Torbert, the parish flourished. After Torbert's death on September 29, 1901, (Note: "The Rev. Henry Martyn Torbert, rector of St. Stephen's church, Boston, Mass., died on Sunday, Sept. 29, 1901, at Toronto, Ontario, where he was spending his vacation. He was born in Newtown, Penn., and was fifty-six years of age at the time of his death. He was graduated from Princeton University, and subsequently from the General Theological Seminary in the class of 1873.") Brent served as rector for two months before his election as bishop.

During the ten years of their work together, Brent and Torbert had built St. Stephen's into an impressive mission. Its "physical plant was expanded to include a parish house, a settlement house, a rescue mission, a lodging house, and a wood and coal yard that allowed men to earn money for their meals and housing for the night." The purpose of these ministries was "to minister to the physical, mental and spiritual needs of people in the loving spirit of Christian neighborliness."

Regarding Brent's ministry in St. Stephen's, Frederick Ward Kates (one of Brent's biographers) wrote that Brent's "humble work in a struggling parish in a crowded neighborhood of underprivileged people proved good schooling for his naturally aristocratic mind. These years deepened not only his ideas of religion but also his insight into human character. … He came to know people, all sorts of people."

=== Social gospel ===
As Brent ministered in Boston's slums, "he became receptive to the social gospel, then in vogue with urban churches throughout the United States." In his "theology of the social gospel," Brent held that the church was "responsible for all of society" and that society would be "regenerated by its participation in the life of the church." Therefore, for Brent the purpose of "the Christian mission" was to renew "the spiritual, social, and economic life of a people."

Brent was influenced by F. D. Maurice and other Anglican Socialists. During his Boston days, he made friends with American Christian Socialists William Dwight Porter Bliss and Vida Dutton Scudder and with leaders of the settlement movement. Brent's "theology of social reform" was based on Jesus' two great commandments: to love God and to love one's neighbor. These commandments can be read in full at Jesus' two great commandments. Regarding these two commandments, Brent wrote in his first book, With God in the World (1900), "God never considers men apart from, but always as part of, a great social order—a social order that is not a concourse of independent units, but a body instinct with life, a society which is not an organization but an organism." Therefore, in Brent's theology, the command to love one's neighbor "applied to the whole of humanity."

=== 1901: a milestone ===
The year 1901 was a milestone for Brent. He suffered losses in the death of his mother and the death of his friend and fellow-worker Torbert. He also had new opportunities. The Reverend William S. Rainsford, rector of the prestigious St. George's Episcopal Church (Manhattan), offered Brent a position on the staff. He was elected to the faculty of the University of the South. The General Theological Seminary in New York City, was "seriously considering him for the position of dean."

While all these opportunities were in the works, on October 11, 1901, Brent was elected by the Episcopal Church's General Convention meeting in San Francisco as the first missionary bishop of the Philippines. He was "both elated and terrified." He was notified of his election by a telegram. Brent recounts receiving the telegram. He was sitting at lunch with friends and they looked in an atlas "to see where the Philippines actually were."

Because, with the exceptions of Liberia, China, and Japan, the Episcopal Church was for the most part "apathetic about foreign missions," it was only "after confiding with close friends and after many days of prayer, Brent accepted the post." On December 19, 1901, in Emmanuel Episcopal Church, Boston, Brent was consecrated as the Episcopal Church's first Missionary Bishop of the Philippines. He remained in that position until February 19, 1918.

== Missionary Bishop ==
After the United States won the Spanish–American War, Spain ceded the Philippines to United States on December 10, 1898. After the United States annexed the Philippines, the colony became an Episcopal Church missionary district on October 2, 1901, by action of the Episcopal Church's General Convention meeting in San Francisco.

=== The demographics ===
When the United States gained control of the Philippines, there was a population of seven and a half million inhabitants, ninety percent of whom were Catholic. The Catholic Church had been there for three centuries under the Spaniards and had been closely linked with the Spanish colonial government, with the Dominicans, Franciscans, and Augustinians together owning "some four hundred thousand acres of land, which they held in a sort of feudal tenure."

In addition to the Catholics, there were three non-Christian groups:

- In northern Luzon, thousands of head-hunting Igorots practiced their pagan religion.
- In the southern islands, three hundred thousand Moro people were Muslims "of an extremely militant type."
- In Manila itself, the Chinese community of shopkeepers was almost entirely non-Christian.

This was the religious situation in the missionary district of which Brent had been elected bishop. Here he would labor for seventeen years to minister to the Christians, to build up the Episcopal church, to convert the non-Christians, and to end the opium traffic throughout Southeast Asia.

=== Long interim ===
After Brent's consecration on December 19, 1901, it was eight months before he arrived in the Philippines. He was busy during this time doing things that included the following:

- He studied the situation and developed plans and policies for the work of the mission.
- He raised money for the work that included "two substantial gifts of money" totaling $120,000.
- He made "important contacts with government officials." This included meetings with President Theodore Roosevelt and his cabinet, as well as William Howard Taft, who had been appointed governor of the Philippines.
- He worked on a long-standing personal matter. Brent was in love with Mary, the only name he wrote in his diaries. (Note: "Brent edited any mention of Mary out of his diaries with ink and a blue crayon, and none of their correspondence survives. Fortunately for the historian, the original writing has bled through over the years and much of it can be read with the aid of a magnifying glass.) He also wrote that she declared her love for him. Nevertheless, they "agreed that it would be best not to marry." However, they continued to send love letters to each other. In several letters Brent proposed to Mary, but she always refused. Brent wrote about this refusal in his diaries: "I have everything [Mary's love], yet nothing [no hope of marriage]!" The correspondence came to an end on August 29, 1904, when Mary wrote, "another hand has come into my life." Brent's reaction was "immersing himself in his work and devoting himself to a life of celibacy." His celibacy resulted in "loneliness frequently left him depressed in later life."

Regarding the annexation of the Philippines by the United States in 1898, President William McKinley said that his decision to do so "was directly linked to his religious faith." He believed it would not be right to return the island to "Catholic Spain" or for the Philippine people to "rule themselves." He decided that it would be best to "educate the Filipinos, and uplift and civilize and Christianize them as our fellow-men for whom Christ died." In line with McKinley's decision, the Episcopal Church's 1898 General Convention "constituted the territory as a missionary district." Brent "believed that properly trained and taught Filipinos could adopt Western customs and thereby become good Episcopalians."

Brent's ministry was congruent with the reasons that McKinley gave for annexing the Philippines. During his seventeen years as missionary bishop, he focused on bringing Christianity to the pagan tribes who lived in the northern part of the island.

Brent "sailed for the islands in 1902, on the same ship with the new Governor General, William Howard Taft whom he had previously met. During the voyage, Brent demonstrated his "ability to deal with American administrators." For the rest of his life, governors and generals found Brent to be "a wise counselor and a spiritual guide."

=== A clear-cut missionary policy ===
Brent arrived in Manila on August 25, 1902, with the "clear-cut missionary policy" which he had formulated during the eight months' interim before he left the United States. His policy included the following:

- He saw the American military personnel, administrators, civil servants, and teachers "as his first responsibility." They were the people who held power and many of them were Episcopalians. Brent wanted them to be "governed by Christian principles."
- He disagreed with the Protestant missionaries who tried to proselytize the Catholics. In 1908, Brent lamented, "when will Christians learn that proselytizing from other Christian churches is ... hateful to our Lord." Nevertheless, Brent "treated the Protestant missionaries with courtesy." Brent's policy directed missionary work toward the three major groups of non-Christians. These three groups were (1) the Chinese community in Manila, (2) the Igorots of the mountains of northern Luzon, and (3) the Muslims who lived in the southern islands.

=== Manila ===
In accordance with his policy, Brent immediately began "to develop the Anglo-American congregation in Manila." Using some of the more than $120,000. he had raised and brought with him, he purchased property in Manila on which to build "a cathedral and a hospital." On January 25, 1906, the cornerstone of the cathedral was laid. In 1907, the building was completed and consecrated. It could seat one thousand people, and it became the center for many activities. One of the activities was the Columbia Club. It was located in the cathedral's parish house with "a basketball court, tennis courts, bowling alleys, showers, and a swimming pool." The Club sometimes had "more than 450 members."

The Chinese. Of the three non-Christian groups toward which Brent's policy directed missionary efforts, the nearest to Manila was the Chinese community in the city, so the effort was directed to this group first. Therefore, three months after his arrival, Brent opened a mission to the Chinese population of Manila who were "virtually untouched" by Christianity. This work "grew steadily and certainly."

Applied social gospel. In his "theology of the social gospel," Brent held that the purpose of "the Christian mission" was to renew "the spiritual, social, and economic life of a people." He applied this theology to a "crowded slum" which lay just outside of "official Manilla." The slum was populated mostly by Catholic Filipinos. The Episcopal church started a settlement house out of which grew "an orphanage, numerous boys' and girls' clubs, sewing classes, and a profitable secondhand exchange." This was followed by a dispensary that later developed into St. Luke's Medical Center and St. Luke's Church, which was used both as a "hospital chapel and mission to the native Filipinos of Manila." In spite of his opposition to proselytizing, Brent said that if this work "brought Filipinos into the Episcopal fold, so be it. However, if the Filipinos returned to the Church of Rome, that also deserved his benediction."

Summer capital of Baguio
In Manila, there is a long hot and humid season. The American colony there faced two problems: how to endure the hot and humid season and how to educate their children without sending back to the United States. The government solved the climate problem "by establishing a summer capital at Baguio, a cool location in northern Luzon." Brent recognized Baguio as an ideal location a school for the education of the children of English-speaking parents. Here he established two schools. Easter School for Igorot boys "who show signs of superior intelligence and capacity for leadership," was opened in 1906. The cost of the school was raised by Brent. That same year, he established a school for the children of English-speaking parents. This school was later called the Brent School.

The Igorots
One of three non-Christian groups Brent focused on converting was "the pagan head-hunting Igorots of the mountains of Luzon. In 1903, Brent took a journey through this "wild and inaccessible" territory. "He traveled by train, by horse and mule, by chair, and on foot." As a result of the journey, Brent envisioned "a chain of mountain stations, to carry the Church's teaching from Manila all the way to the northern coast. As a step toward implementing his vision, a mission church was established for the Bontoc Tribe of the Igorots in the Bontoc, Mountain Province where they lived. The Bontoc missionaries wrote the first Igorot grammars, which were published by the government.

The Moros
Another of the three non-Christian groups Brent focused on converting was the Muslims who lived in the southern Sulu Archipelago.

Spain had fought the Moros who were Muslims and included a gang of pirates, throughout its three hundred years of occupation without "a peaceful settlement." Brent did not want the United States to continue this futile policy. As an effort to effect a peaceful settlement between the United States and the Muslims, Brent visited them. Government officials warned him that he was risking his life, but he made the visit "without military escort and succeeded in winning some measure of their confidence."

The visit that effected Brent's winning a measure of confidence in him was planned by Brent in collaboration with the government. William Howard Taft, the American governor and friend of Brent also wanted a peaceful settlement. A meeting with the pirates was negotiated. On the day of the meeting, both an armed naval ship and a small unarmed boat from the ship went out to meet the Moro pirates. Before the Moro's boats would come closer, the ship had to depart the scene and leave the small boat alone to meet the pirates. Brent and his co-worker, Mrs. Lorillard Spencer, (Note: After the death of her husband, Mrs. Lorillard Spencer volunteered as an Episcopal Church missionary in the Philippines. Her work was on the island of Jolo and its goal was to convert the Muslim population to Christianity.) were in the boat unarmed. Some of the pirates jumped into the small boat "heavily armed and plotting murder." Brent stood up, threw his penknife down on the deck. He pointed to the knife and said, "You call yourselves brave men. There is the only weapon I have. You came aboard my boat in the presence of an unarmed white man and a defenseless white woman as my guests, heavily armed." Shame-faced, the pirates put their weapons down on the deck with Brent's penknife.

Brent felt that the Moro mission was so important that, when the Episcopal church's Board of Mission decided not allocate money for the mission, he "made the Moro mission his personal enterprise and raised money from friends at home."

With the money he had raised and with the measure of confidence effected by his meeting with the pirates, Brent was able to begin his mission to the Moros. In 1905, he dedicated the Mission of the Holy Trinity, Zamboanga on the island of Mindanao. The mission provided "the first contact" between the Episcopal Church's missionaries of the Moro people.

Converting the Moro Muslim was so difficult that Brent decided to try "an indirect approach." By 1914, a hospital had been built. The hospital was located at Zamboanga City. It was the only hospital for a native population of 80,000 people. The next step was establishing "a Moro settlement school for women and girls." It opened in 1914. In 1916, the Moro Agricultural School opened on Jolo island. After that the Willard Straight Agricultural School in Indanan was opened. Teaching the Moros how to prosper by farming turned them from piracy.

=== Fought opium use ===
William Howard Taft arrived in the Philippines as the American Governor on the same ship with Brent. One problem Taft faced was what to do about the "opium problem." Governor Taft supported continuing the policy of the Spaniards that included issuing "narcotics addicts" licenses and "legally supplying" them with opium. However, this policy was opposed "on moral grounds" by two American clergy, one of whom was Brent. Their position prevailed, so the United States Congress ordered an end to all "legal sales" of opium by 1908. Brent's opposition made him "a world figure in the fight against opium traffic."

In Brent's view, opium was "the greatest evil in Filipino society," so he went all out to stop its use. He served on a three-man commission "to investigate the use of and traffic in opium and the laws regarding such use and traffic in Japan, Formosa, Shanghai, Hong Kong, Saigon, Singapore, Burma, Java, and the Philippine Islands." The commission had its first meeting on August 13, 1903. After months of gathering information and deliberation, the commission presented its recommendations on March 15, 1904. In summary, recommendation was "for opium to become a government monopoly immediately, this to become prohibition, except for medical purposes, after three years." The commission's recommendation was made law by the United States Congress.

Brent's work against opium continued with the February 1909 International Opium Commission in Shanghai. He was "chief commissioner of the American delegation" and he presided over the meeting which was "dominated by his leadership and vision." Brent's work against opium made him "an international figure and statesman." In 1912, an international opium conference adopted the International Opium Convention, "the world's first international drug control treaty "was passed in the Hague." Brent was the chairman of the American delegation to this conference.

=== Back home ===
During his time in the Philippines, Brent was elected four times by dioceses in the United States. Beginning in 1908, he was called three times to be Bishop of Washington. He was also elected as bishop of New Jersey. Brent declined all these elections. After his 1908 election to be Bishop of Washington, Brent "sent a telegram to the chairman of the standing committee: "Must decline. I would have gone, but God bids me stay. John 3:30."

=== Attitude toward Catholic Church in the Philippines ===
Brent disapproved proselytizing Catholics because of doctrinal reasons. He saw "considerable value" in Catholic theology, so he supported cooperation at first. However, after eighteen months in the Philippines, Brent "expressed almost complete disillusionment" with the Catholic Church.

=== Ecumenical movement ===
In the first part of the twentieth century, Christians "began to seek the reconciliation of their divided churches." Brent believed in Ecumenism and was one of the leaders of this movement. Brent's observation of the serious need for church unity while in the Philippines resulted in his working for it during his time as missionary bishop of the Philippines and as bishop of Western New York, that is, for the rest of his life.

At first, Brent worked for "interdenominational co-operation." Later, he worked for "organic union." Brent once wrote that "the unity of Christendom is not a luxury, but a necessity. ... It is absurd to aim at a united mankind, or even a united Christian civilization, and to be content with a divided Church."

While bishop of the Philippines, Brent attended the 1910 World Missionary Conference in Edinburgh and came to believe that a reunited church was "possible within a century."

The Edinburgh Conference called "for global evangelism and ecumenism." Brent was inspired by this call, but he was also frustrated by the lack of discussion about the divisive differences between the churches in their doctrines and orders. He believed that these faith and order issues had to be dealt with before genuine unity could be achieved. Therefore, during the conference, he proposed "a conference on the faith and order of the church" which would address these issues. After returning to the United States, as a follow-up, he presented his proposal to the Episcopal church's 1910 General Convention. Brent's proposal was unanimously adopted and a commission was set up to implement it. The banker J. P. Morgan (an active Episcopalian) was so taken by the idea of such a conference that he donated $100,000. toward its cost. The Episcopal commission worked hard to bring about Brent's desire for a faith and order conference.

After his participation in the Edinburgh Conference, Brent became even more of an "international celebrity" in religious circles. From the Edinburgh Conference through the 1927 Lausanne Conference, Brent was considered "the animating spirit of the Faith and Order Movement."

=== 1910 address at Howard University ===
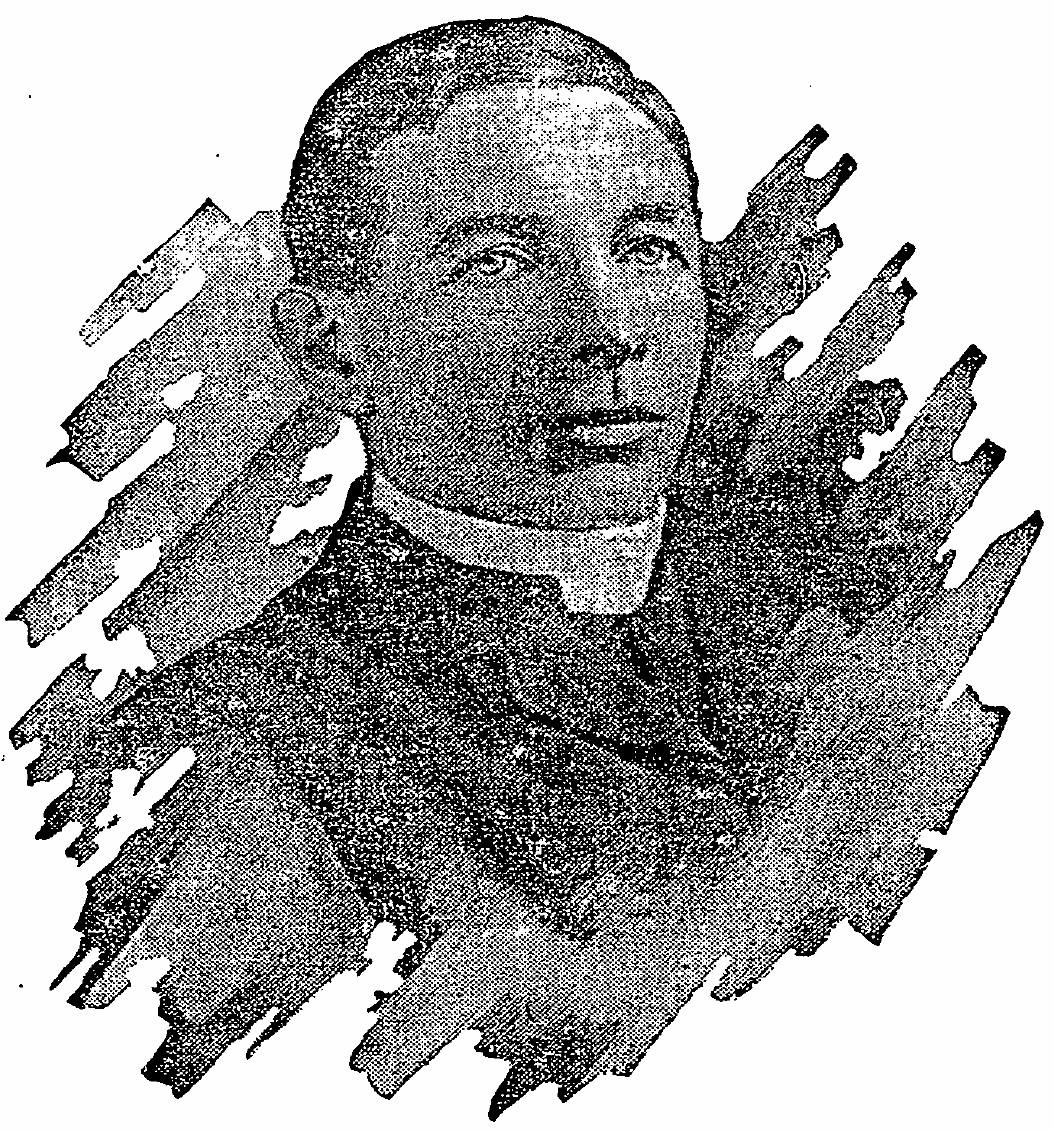
Charles Henry Brent 1910 photo in New York Times

In November 1910, Brent gave an address at Howard University, an historically black school in Washington, D.C. His prior assignments had prepared Brent for such an occasion. During his time with the Cowley fathers in Boston, Brent was assigned to "St. Augustine's Mission for Negroes." It was "an early schooling" for Brent "in the spiritual care of colored folk" as preparation for working with people of other races in the Philippines. This ministry also increased "his conviction that the Christian Gospel could overcome all the human divisions of race and culture."

After his assignment at St. Augustine's, Brent had ministered ten years (1891–1901) as assistant minister at St. Stephen's Mission, Boston. During his ten years at St. Stephen's, he came to believe in "the essential value of every man, of whatever race or color or creed." In the Philippines, this belief was deepened. He wrote that "it was among the pagan peoples that I learned that equality before God of all men, which I count to be the chief treasure I have honestly made my own in my life time."

Brent's belief in the "equality before God of all men" was reflected in his address at Howard University. He asserted that "God's intention for mankind is that it should be a wonderfully diversified family, a family at unity with itself." Within this diversity, Brent said that "all of us" are seeking "manhood." This, said Brent, is "the one thing that God gave us the capacity for, which will differentiate us from all the rest of creation, and from the very angels in heaven." God gave mankind the capacity, but "no man ever gained manhood, no woman ever gained womanhood, without fighting for it." Given the necessity of fighting for it, Brent challenged the students to "determine above all else to reach the highest goal; to reach the goal of manhood; and having gained manhood, you have gained the best thing that God or the world can bestow upon you."

=== Chaplain of the American Expeditionary Forces ===
By the beginning of the first World War, Brent was "a world-renowned figure, a friend of national leaders in many countries, a citizen of the world, a foremost leader in the affairs of his Church." In 1917, he left the Philippines permanently because of ill health.

Brent suffered from "recurring heart attacks that left him temporarily incapacitated." However, he refused to reduce his work load. As an example, Brent resigned as the missionary bishop of the Philippines on October 20, 1917. Then he began an even more stressful work in Europe as the Senior Headquarter's Chaplain of the American Expeditionary Forces."

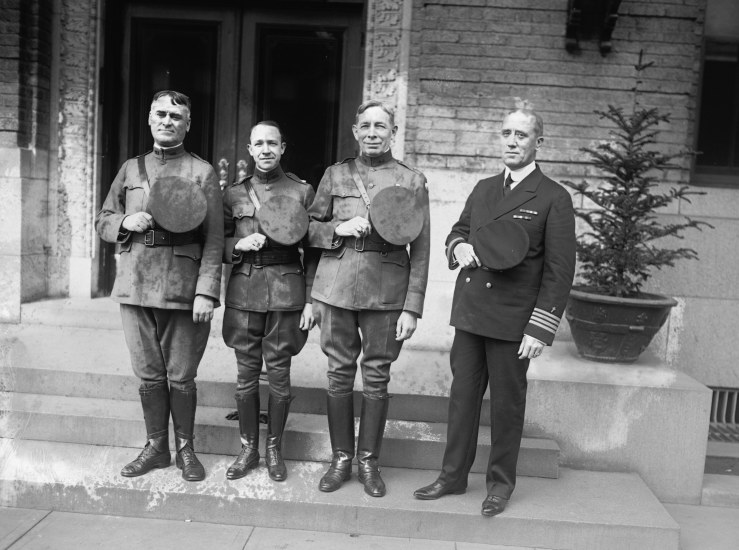
Brent, 2nd from Right, while Chief-of-Chaplains of the American Expeditionary Forces, 1917–1918

General John J. Pershing was Commander of the American Expeditionary Forces. He knew Brent; he had been baptized and confirmed by him in the Philippines. Pershing invited Brent to be the Chief-of-Chaplains of the American Expeditionary Forces. Although Brent was "a lover of peace," he accepted the invitation. He served in this capacity from 1917 to 1918.

During his service, Brent was sometimes called "the khaki-colored bishop." He often functioned as "a good-will ambassador" reconciling disagreements between organizations and between nations, especially between Great Britain and the United States. Brent was chosen in 1918 by Pershing to deliver the General's message to the men on the American and British ships stationed in the North Sea. He convinced the French government to take action against the "organized vice which threatened the morality of the army."

=== Return to United States ===
While he was serving as Chief-of-Chaplains, Brent was elected as bishop of the Episcopal Diocese of Western New York on October 2, 1917, just over a year before the Armistice on November 11, 1918. Brent's health was broken, he could not return to the unhealthy climate of Manila, so he accepted. He took up residence and his duties in 1919.

=== Evaluation of Brent's mission strategy ===
During his fifteen years as Missionary Bishop of the Philippines, Brent "wrote fourteen books and became the most persuasive spokesman for missions in the Episcopal church"

On the positive side, Brent's leadership effected a strong Episcopal Church in the Philippines. During his time as bishop (1901-1918), "hospitals, churches, schools for boys and girls, mission-stations, and a great cathedral-center were established."

On the less positive side, there were significant problems:

1. There was the difficulty of staffing the programs initiated by Brent. There was frequent turnover, and he had to turn to "army and civil service personnel," many of whom were not Episcopalians, for replacements.
2. Brent's original plan was for a diocese centered on Manila. However, the size of the diocese plus the cost and dangers of travel made this plan impractical. Furthermore, if the indigenous Episcopalians did travel to Manila for meetings, their differences in language and social customs rendered communication difficult.
3. Brent was often away from the Philippines about a fourth of the time. His critics called him "the bishop from the Philippines." Many of his absences were trips were to the United States occasioned by "death in his family, poor health, triennial General Conventions, and the constant need for fund-raising." Also, because he was a leader in the crusade against the opium trade, he attended meetings away from the Philippines.

=== Destruction in World War II ===
In the fall of 1945, Chaplain W. Hubert Bierck visited the area where the Igorot people live to assess the damage done and the repairs that had been done by the United States Army Corps of Engineers since the Japanese surrendered on August 15, 1945. He found that in Baguio the Easter School (founded by Brent in 1906) was badly damaged. In Sagada, St. Mary's Church, the houses where mission people lived, and the boys' school were all totally destroyed. In Bontoc, Mountain Province, the church was damaged "beyond repair." On the positive side, Bierck noted that in the whole Ingorot area, there were Christian adult women and men, some of whom had been children when Bishop Brent explored the region and started missions and schools some forty years earlier.

== Return to New York ==
After Brent finished his service as senior chaplain of the American Expeditionary Forces during World War I, he did not return to his missionary diocese in the Philippines. He was elected the fourth bishop of the Episcopal Diocese of Western New York on October 2, 1917. By then, Brent's health had so deteriorated that remaining in the Philippines was no longer viable, so this time he accepted an election by a diocese in the States.

After his election, Brent was given an "acknowledgment service" in St. Paul's Cathedral, Buffalo, on February 7, 1919. He assumed his duties on February 19, 1918. The diocese granted him an assistant the next year when The Rev. David Lincoln Ferris, D.D., of Rochester was consecrated his suffragan."

Before becoming bishop of the Diocese of Western New York, "Brent had become ... the most widely influential Episcopal clergyman in the United States." In October 1919, he preached at the General Convention of the Episcopal Church at St. Paul's Cathedral in Detroit.

=== Brent's predecessor and successor ===
MC: Brent's predecessor was William David Walker. Walker opposed association with other Christian denominations. He controlled his clergy "with an iron hand." Brent differed from Walker "in points of view and methods of administration." Brent supported working with other denominations. He removed Walker's inhibitions on diocesan clergy. Rather than controlling his clergy with "an iron hand" as Walker did, Brent led "by precept and example."

Brent's successor David Lincoln Ferris said that in serving with Brent, he was serving with "one of the greatest men in the Episcopate."

=== Extremely active within his diocese and away from it ===
Within his diocese, in order to fulfill his duties and diocesan bishop, Brent had to keep so many appointments that he was known for driving over the speed limit to make them.

Although the diocese suffered because Brent was away so often working on the causes to which he committed himself, "the diocese was proud to have as its bishop a man of such stature." Not only was the diocese proud that its bishop was a man of such stature, Brent's "mistakes, absences, and limited acquaintance" with his diocese were overcome by "the greatness and inspiration of his person."

Away from his diocese, he worked for "Christian unity" and for "world peace." His away activities included the following:

1. Served on the board of overseers of Harvard University.
2. Delivered the Duff Lectures at Edinburgh in 1921.
3. President Harding appointed Brent as a member of the Advisory Committee on Narcotics of the League of Nations in Geneva, Switzerland in 1923 and 1924.
4. Served as chairman of the Sub-Committee on International Affairs at the Universal Christian Conference on Life and Work in Stockholm in 1925.
5. Served as "titular Chancellor" of Hobart College, Geneva, New York.
6. Served as Bishop-in-Charge of the American Episcopal Churches in Europe from 1926 to 1928.
7. Elected President of the First World Conference on Faith and Order held at Lausanne in 1927.

=== 1925 "The Authority of Christ" sermon ===
In 1925, Brent preached the sermon at the consecration of Ernest M. Stires as Bishop of the Episcopal Diocese of Long Island. The subject of the sermon was "The Authority of Christ." At the time of this sermon, Brent was involved in planning for the first World Conference on Faith and Order which he had proposed in 1910 while he was Missionary Bishop of the Philippines. In 1925, he met with the planning committee in Stockholm, Sweden to make final plans for the Conference that was held in 1927 in Lausanne, Switzerland. In his sermon, Brent summarized the belief that motivated his efforts in the ecumenical movement: "The unity of Christendom is no longer a beautiful dream. It is a pressing necessity for the arousing of that passion for Christ which will be the most flaming thing in the world, that certainty of voice and touch which will quell honest doubt and perplexity, that fund of wisdom which will open up spiritual vistas such as now we only yearn for."

=== Work for Episcopal Church colleges ===
By the end of the first World War, there were only five Episcopal colleges out of the "great many" which the Episcopal Church had established. Because of their "meager enrollments" and "financial difficulties," it seemed that they would probably soon close. Brent was "determined that this would not be." At this time, Brent had two priorities. One was church unity, which he pursued until his death. The other was doing what he could to overcome the separation in America "between secular education and the Christian religion" by trying to convince the Episcopal Church to give financial support to its five remaining colleges. As "titular Chancellor" of Hobart College. Brent led the effort which got off to "a good start" with the 1922 General Convention budgeting $10,000. for each of the five colleges. However, the 1925 General Convention reduced the appropriation to $6,000. for each college, and the 1928 General Convention appropriated nothing.

In 1929, just before Brent "sailed for that ecumenical journey in 1929 on which he died," he gave an interview explaining why he believed church colleges were so important. He described "a Church college" as one "in which there is no dodging of facts, no coloring of science, but also and even more one in which Christ's revelation about the meaning of the universe and about the nature and destiny of man is assumed in all the teaching, in the administration, in the life of the place." The faculty would "know and respect" the "central convictions" of Christianity and teach them. Brent said that he would like to keep up his effort but that he knew he "had not long to live."

=== Reflections on the twenty-fifth anniversary of his consecration ===
In 1926, on the twenty-fifth anniversary of his consecration as bishop, Brent wrote, "For three things I am deeply grateful—that I am Canadian born and bred, that I had a mother who for character and spiritual culture was the peer of the best, and that a country rectory, where my father served for forty-two years, sheltered my young days. From my Canadian breeding I got that fine, just discipline, which held within bounds a nature that could easily have gone on the rocks; to my mother's wise and loving influence I owe all the good that is in me; and it was my father's long rectorate in the little village where I was born that burned into my soul the high value of stability."

=== Work for Church unity ===
During his tenure as bishop of Western New York, working for church unity often took him away from his diocese as it had when he was in the Philippines. "The unity of Christendom," he declared, "is not a luxury, but a necessity, and the world will go limping until Christ's prayer that all may be one is answered." During his years as a missionary bishop in the Philippines, he had recognized that only a united Church could succeed in converting great nations. He had seen for himself "the waste of energy, money, personnel, and the confusion and weakness of competing Christian bodies."

From August 3–12, 1927, the First World Conference on Faith and Order met in Lausanne, Switzerland. Preparation for the Conference had taken seventeen years. Brent worked during that time as one of the organizers. The Conference was attended by 406 delegates from 108 Christian denominations. Brent was elected as presiding officer by a unanimous vote. He opened the Conference by reminding the delegates that neither "total agreement" nor "a federation" of the denominations was their purpose. Their purpose was, he stated, "to learn to fellowship with one another, to listen sympathetically, and to open themselves to the guidance of the Holy Spirit." This Brent asserted would be "an important first step in a long pilgrimage to restore the true catholic church."

Poor health. The success of the conference was in large part the result of Brent's leadership. "His sense of humor, his diplomatic skill, and his patience kept the conference from breaking up on several occasions." For Brent, the conference was his "finest hour, but it was bittersweet." His health was poor and he died less than two years after the conference on March 27, 1929.

Semi-centennial commemoration. A four-day commemoration of the fiftieth anniversary of the 1927 first World Conference on Faith and Order was held in the summer of 1977 in Lausanne. Brent was often mentioned.

Critics. Brent also had his critics. "It seemed to many" that Brent's commitment to church unity resulted in his "minimizing fundamentals of Christian doctrine." His broad "definition of the Catholic Church" and "his latitudinarianism with regard to Holy Orders" were denounced."

In 1928, Brent represented the Episcopal Church at Cosmo Gordon Lang's enthronement as archbishop of Canterbury on December 4, 1928. He died in Europe without ever returning to his diocese.

== Death and legacy ==
Brent preached his last sermon in Canterbury Cathedral in November 1928. Its subject was "The Way to Peace."

The "last public appearance" by Brent was "as representative of the Episcopal Church at the enthronement of Cosmo Gordon Lang as archbishop of Canterbury" on December 4, 1928. After the enthronement, following his physician Sir Thomas Barlow's advice, Brent did not return to the United States. Rather, he stayed the next three months in the American Embassy in London as the guest of Ambassador Alanson B. Houghton. It was hoped that the rest would facilitate recovery." Sir Thomas told Brent that by living "a restricted life" he might "live for years," but that "his heart might fail him at any time without warning."

=== Somewhat improved ===
Brent's rest in American Embassy seemed to have improved his health. During this period, in a letter to his diocese, he said, "I am happy to think that by the time this greets your eyes, I shall have once more taken up active work with you again." The letter also contained "in detail his plans for the next eight months."

To further his health improvement, in March, 1929 Brent set out on a trip to the Mediterranean for a cruise with Sir Thomas. Arriving in Paris on March 21, Brent called on General Pershing and attended service at Holy Trinity Church on Palm Sunday, March 24, the last service he ever attended." The next day Brent began his trip. He stopped at Lausanne, Switzerland where he died on March 27, 1929. "And so Lausanne became the final resting-place for this gallant, daring, and consecrated soldier and servant of Christ." Brent was buried in the Bois de Vaux Cemetery, Lausanne, Switzerland.

Lausanne "had become the enduring symbol" of Brent's "greatest contribution to Christendom." There Brent presided over the first World Conference on Faith and Order, which met in Lausanne, Switzerland, August 3–12, 1927."

During his life Brent had become "one of the most intrepid and gallant ambassadors of Christ the world has known for many years." After his death "the Christian world mourned the passing of a tall, somewhat austere, often deeply lonesome man who had grown during his lifetime into one of modern Christendom's foremost leaders, prophets, and seers." Brent was buried in the Bois-de-Vaux Cemetery, Lausanne, Switzerland.

In a section of the Bois de Vaux cemetery that is reserved for distinguished foreigners, there is a 7'×3' granite grave marker. The following epitaph is carved into the granite under a large Celtic Cross:

Charles Henry Brent, 1862–1929

A soldier of Christ
A servant of Humanity
An Apostle of Christian Unity
Bishop of the Philippine Islands, 1901–1918
Bishop of Western New York, 1918–1929
Chief of Chaplains American Expeditionary Force, 1917–1918

President First World Conference on Faith and Order, 1927

Th epitaph indicates that Brent was "a unique, energetic, multitalented leader of the modern church."

By the time of his death, Brent was probably the best known Episcopal clergyman since Phillips Brooks. He left a lasting mark on the church. Although Brent attended just one Faith and Order Conference before he died, the Conferences on Faith and Order continued under a Continuation Committee led by Archbishop William Temple, Bishop Yngve T. Brilioth, and until 1948. At that time, Faith and Order became the Faith and Order Commission of the World Council of Churches.

=== Things that Matter ===
On January 2, 1929, Brent wrote in his diary that the title of his next book would be Things that Matter. He did not have time to write the book, but in the few weeks before he died in March, he wrote an article addressed to the laity and clergy of his diocese and called "Things that Matter." The article deals with things that matter "in this world and the next." Brent said that he was writing from "the edge of the grave."

Two realities.

In the article, Brent wrote that "there are but two great realities in the whole universe–the heart of God and the heart of man, and each is ever seeking the other. It is this that makes the adventure for God not an experiment, but a certainty. The appeal issuing from man's abysmal need is met by the amplitude of the divine supply."[97]

Prayer. Regarding prayer, Brent wrote:

The thought of God keeping tryst with us is a winsome thought. When we go to pray, God has already come to the meeting-place. We are never there first. The great thing to remember is that God, being Who He is, is more ready to hear than we to pray, more eager to give than we to receive, more active to find us than we to find Him. God is ever seeking man: His ear is more sensitive to the words, His heart to the desires of men, then the aspen leaf on a summer breeze, than the compass needle to the call of the poles. The essence of prayer is desire, forming itself into hope and aspiration, and mounting up into effort, in the direction of the unattained. Prayer is the address made by human personality to that which it is desired to establish affiliations. It is a movement of the whole being which reaches after the heart's desire. . . . One may say that the real end of prayer is not so much to get this or that single desire granted, so much as to put human life in full and joyful conformity with the will of God.

Conclusion. Brent concluded the article with these words:

My solemn conviction born of years of pain and struggle, confirmed as I skirt eternity, is that what I have said in the foregoing pages must form the main background for the truly Christian life. It is the kernel of the matter. All else, however important, is of a subordinate nature. If you have, in a sincere soul, as your permanent ideal, the great principles on which I have touched and if you pursue them with 'terrible meekness,' you will accomplish a work greater than that of empire builders or world statesmen.

=== Memorial services ===
Two memorial services for Brent were held in the Diocese of Western New York. One was held in St. Paul's Cathedral (Buffalo, New York) on April 24, 1929. The preacher was the Rt. Rev. A. C. A. Hall, D. D., the Bishop of the Diocese of Vermont. The other service was in the eastern part of the diocese on May 10. It was held in Christ Church, Rochester. The preacher was the Rt. Rev. James E. Freeman, D. D., the Bishop of the Episcopal Diocese of Washington.

At the St. Paul's Cathedral service, the Rt. Rev. James Sweeny, D. D., bishop of the Anglican Diocese of Toronto delivered two messages from the Church of England in Canada. The message from the Missionary Society expressed "their admiration of the greatness and power of [Brent's] life as one of the foremost Missionary Leaders and Christian Statesmen of this age." The message from Diocese of Toronto's Clergy and Laity said in part, "by his international work on behalf of World Peace, of Christian Unity, Faith and Order, and of the restriction of the Opium traffic, Dr. Brent made his influence felt as widely as that of any living Churchman. At Brent's memorial service on April 24, 1929, he was recognized as "one of the foremost Missionary Leaders and Christian Statesmen of [his age]."

=== Commemorated in two liturgical calendars ===
Brent is commemorated in the Episcopal Church's Liturgical Calendar on March 27. The collect for his commemoration is as follows:

Heavenly Father, whose Son prayed that we all might be one: deliver us from arrogance and prejudice,
and give us wisdom and forbearance, that, following your servant Charles Henry Brent, we may be
united in one family with all who confess the Name of your Son Jesus Christ: who lives and reigns with
you and the Holy Spirit, one God, now and for ever.

In addition to being commemorated, a prayer for mission in Morning Prayer in the Book of Common Prayer (Rite 1 on page 58; Rite 2 on page 101) was written by Brent. The Rite 2 version of Brent's prayer is as follows:

Lord Jesus Christ, you stretched out your arms of love on
the hard wood of the cross that everyone might come within
the reach of your saving embrace: So clothe us in your Spirit
that we, reaching forth our hands in love, may bring those
who do not know you to the knowledge and love of you; for
the honor of your Name. Amen.

The Anglican Church of Canada also commemorates Brent on March 27 as "Charles Henry Brent, Bishop of the Philippines, and of Western New York, 1929."

The historian James Thayer Addison characterized Brent as a "a saint of disciplined mental vigor, one whom soldiers were proud to salute and whom children were happy to play with, who could dominate a parliament and minister to an invalid, a priest and bishop who gloried in the heritage of his Church, yet who stood among all Christian brothers as one who served ... He was everywhere an ambassador for Christ."

=== Degrees and decorations ===
Brent was awarded degrees and decorations as follow:

- Doctor of Divinity: Toronto, 1901; King's College, 1907, Harvard, 1913; Yale, 1919; Glasgow, 1920; Trinity College, Hartford, 1921
- Doctor of Sacred Theology: Columbia, 1920
- Doctor of Laws: Rochester, 1922; Union College, 1924; Toronto, 1924; New York University, 1925
- Companion of the Order of Leopold (Belgium)
- Officer of the Legion of Honor (France),
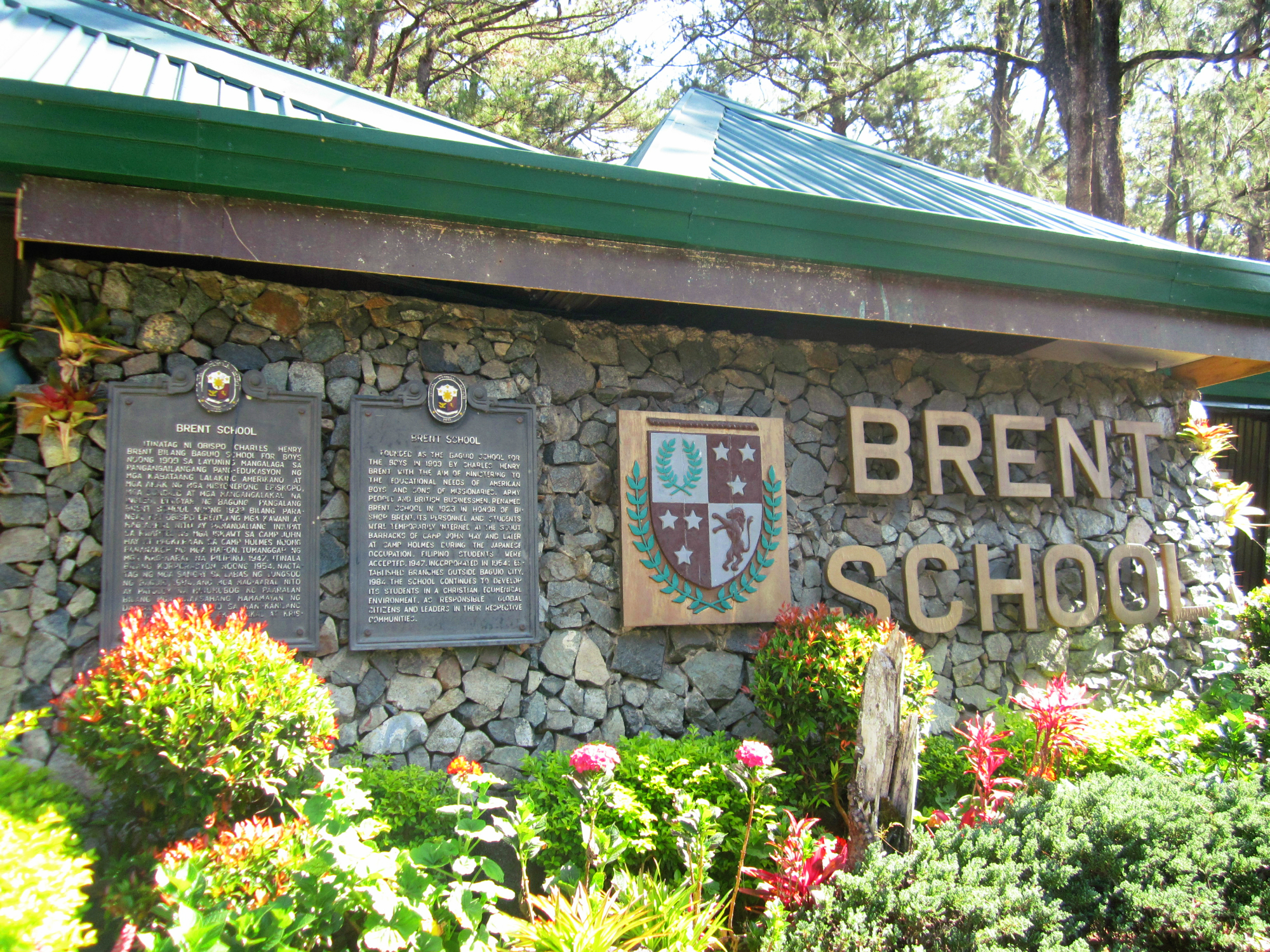
  Brent School in Baguio: Shows plagues about Brent's founding the school in both English and Tagalog.
- Distinguished Service Medal (United States). conferred by General Pershing

=== Brent International School ===
Brent went to the Philippines as missionary bishop with "a three pronged mission" one of which was education. In fulfillment of this mission, in 1909, Brent founded the Brent International School, at first named Baguio School, in Baguio. The school was patterned on schools in the United States such as the Groton School." Girls were admitted in 1925 which made Brent the first co-educational day and boarding school in East Asia. Today, there are two other campuses: one in Manila and one in the Subic Bay Freeport Zone. For 2016 information about the school and its history click on Brent School.

== Works ==
Brent was "a widely published author." He was "a gifted writer and commanding preacher." During the time that Brent served in the Philippine Islands (1902–1918) he made frequent trips back to the United States. He used "these long sea-voyages ... for reading, meditation, and writing." The list of his works below shows some twenty writings published during his time in the Philippines.

=== Books, pamphlets, and reports by Brent ===
Brent published more than twenty books. His books reveal "a man equally absorbed in the problems and mysteries of the inner life.

- 1896 The Spirit and Work of the Early Christian Socialists (Publications of the Church Social Union, 1896).
- 1899 With God in the World: A Series of Papers (Longmans, Green and Co. 1899)
- 1904 The Consolations of the Cross: Addresses on the Seven Words of the Dying Lord (Longmans, Green and Co., 1904)
- 1904 The Splendor of the Human Body: A Reparation and an Appeal (Longmans, Green and Co. 1904).
- 1905 Adventure for God, The Paddock Lectures. (Longmans, Green and Co., 1905)
- 1905 Report of the committee appointed by the Philippine Commission to investigate the use of opium and the traffic therein and the rules, ordinances and laws regulating such use and traffic in Japan, Formosa, Shanghai, Hongkong, Saigon, Singapore, Burmah, Java, and the Philippine Islands Others on the Commission were co-authors. (United States Government Printing Office, 1905)
- 1906 Liberty and Other Sermons (Longmans, Green and Co.)
- 1907 With God in Prayer (G. W. Jacobs, 1907)
- 1908 Leadership: The William Belden Noble Lectures (delivered at Sanders theater, Harvard University, December 1907). (Longmans, Green and Co., 1908)
- 1908 The Mind of Christ Jesus in the Church of the Living God (Longmans, Green and Co., 1908)
- 1910 Addresses by the Right Reverend Charles H. Brent, bishop of the Philippines, Mr. Dwight O. W. Holmes, A.M., Dr. Elmer E. Brown, United States commissioner of education, President Taft, on University Training. (Howard University Press, 1910)
- 1914 Presence (Longmans, Green and Co., 1914)
- 1915 Adventure for God (Longmans, Green and Co., 1915)
- 1915 The Revelation of Discovery (Longmans, Green and Co., 1915)
- 1915 The Inspiration of Responsibility and Other Papers (Longmans, Green and Co., 1915.) "These papers and addresses, with a few exceptions, have been printed separately or else in current journals."
- 1915 Prisoners of Hope and Other Sermons (Longmans, Green and Co., 1915)
- 1916 A Master Builder: Being the Life and Letters of Henry Yates Satterlee, First Bishop of Washington (Longmans, Green and Co., 1916)
- 1916 The Conquest of Trouble and the Peace of God: Musings by the Right Rev. C. H. Brent (H. Rees, 1916)
- 1918 The Mount of Vision: Being a Study of Life in Terms of the Whole (Longmans, Green and Co., 1918)
- 1919 The Sixth Sense: Its Cultivation and Use, edited by Edward Howard Griggs. (B. W. Huebsch, 1911.)] Book contains five articles by Brent.
- 1924 In Memoriam Robert Hallowell Gardiner: September 9, 1855 – June 15, 1924 (Boston, s.n., 1924)
- 1925 Making the World Safe for Peace: Commencement Address June tenth, nineteen hundred twenty-five (New York, 1925)
- 1925 Understanding, Being an Interpretation of the Universal Christian Conference on Life and Work, Held in Stockholm, August 15–30, 1925 (Longmans, Green and Co., 1925)
- 1925 World conference on faith and order: Announcement of meeting in Washington, D.C., May 1925 (Typewritten, 1925)
- 1925 The Christian Way Toward Unity (The Secretariat, 1925)
- 1930 The Commonwealth: Its Foundations and Pillars (D. Appleton, 1930)
- 1930 A Victor: Nathaniel Bowditch Potter (Marshall Jones Co., 1930)
- 1943 A Day-book Chosen From the Writings of Charles Henry Brent, 1862-1929 (Forward Movement, 1943.)
- 1949 Things that Matter: The Best Writings of Bishop Brent, edited by Frederick Ward Kates. [Contents include: Things That Matter, That They all May be One, Man's Meeting with God, The Last Great Adventure, and a biographical sketch of Bishop Brent.] (Harper & Brothers, 1949)
- 1952 Prayers of Bishop Brent: Servant of the Universal Church, Apostle of Christian Unity, Friend of Humanity (Forward Movement Publications, 1952)
- 1956 Walking with God: A Devotional Miscellany from the Unpublished Personal Papers of Bishop Charles Henry Brent, (Church Historical Society Publications, 1956)
- 1965 No Other Wealth: The Prayers of a Modern-Day Saint Bishop Charles Henry Brent 1862–1929, edited by Frederick Ward Kates (The Upper Room, 1965)
- 2003 What is Dying?, Ben Ecclestone (Illustrator), (Souvenir Press Ltd., 2003)

=== Individual sermons by Brent ===
- 1901 In Whom Was No Guile: a Sermon Preached in Memory of Henry Martyn Torbert, Minister of Saint Stephen's Church, Boston, Massachusetts on Sunday, October 6, 1901 (Merrymount Press, 1901).
- 1917 The Commonwealth of Mankind: a Sermon Preached in St. Paul's Cathedral, April 20, 1917, at a Solemn Service to Almighty God on the Occasion of the Entry of the United States of America into the Great War for Freedom, Attended by their Majesties the King and Queen and the American Ambassador (London: A. R. Mowbray, 1917).
- 1921 The Peace of Christ; from a Sermon Preached in Trinity Church, Buffalo, New York, Palm Sunday (s.n., 1921),
- 1926 The Authority of Christ, a sermon by Charles Henry Brent, Bishop of Western New York in 1926.
- 1927 The Call to Unity: A Sermon to be Preached in the Cathedral, Lausanne, Switzerland on August 3, 1927 (The Secretariat, 1927)

=== Works about Brent ===
Books and Pamphlets

- William Thomas Manning, Address of William T. Manning, at the memorial service for the Right Reverend Charles Henry Brent, at the Cathedral of St. John the Divine, Sunday, April 28th, 1929 (n.p. 1929)
- James J. Halsema, Bishop Brent's Baguio School: The first 75 Years (Brent School Inc., 1988)
- Eleanor Slater, Charles Henry Brent: Everybody's Bishop (Morehouse Publishing, 1932)
- Alexander C. Zabriskie, Bishop Brent: Crusader for Christian Unity (Westminster Press, 1948).
- Frederick W. Kates, Charles Henry Brent: Ambassador of Christ (SCM Press, Ltd., 1948)
- Frederick Ward Kates, Lo, I come to do thy will, O God: An appreciation of Bishop Charles Henry Brent (1862–1929) (Church Historical Society Publications, 1959)
- Leopold Damrosch, Charles Henry Brent in the Philippines (Pioneer Builders for Christ, 1956)
- Kenton J. Clymer, Protestant Missionaries in the Philippines, 1898–1916: An Inquiry into the American Colonial Mentality (Urbana: Univ. of Illinois Press, 1986). Book includes important material on Brent.
- Handbooks on the Missions of the Episcopal Church, No. III. Philippine Islands (National Council of the Protestant Episcopal Church Department of Missions, 1923.)
- Library of Congress. Manuscript Division, Bishop Charles Henry Brent: a register of his papers in the Library of Congress (University of Michigan Library, 1959)

Articles

- Mark D. Norbeck, "The Legacy of Charles Henry Brent." International Bulletin of Missionary Research, Vol. 20, No. 4 (October 1996), 168.
- Kenton J. Clymer, "The Episcopalian Missionary Encounter with Roman Catholicism in the Philippines, 1901-1916" in Philippine Studies, Vol. 28, No. 1 (First Quarter 1980).
- Eugene C. Bianchi, "The Ecumenical Thought of Bishop Charles Brent" in Church History 33 (December 1964: 448–61).
- Michael C. Reilly, "Charles Henry Brent: Philippine Missionary and Ecumenist" in Philippine Studies 24 (1976: 303–25).
- Mark D. Norbeck, The Protestant Episcopal Church in the City of Manila, Philippine Islands, from 1898 to 1918: An Institutional History (M.A. thesis, University of Texas at El Paso, 1992)
- Emma J. Portuondo, The Impact of Bishop Charles Henry Brent upon American Colonial and Foreign Policy, 1901-1917 (Ph.D. dissertation, Catholic University of America, 1969)
- Leon G. Rosenthal, Christian Statesmanship in the First Missionary-Ecumenical Generation (Ph.D. dissertation, University of Chicago, 1989).
- Upbuilding the Wards of the Nation: the Work of Charles H. Brent, of the Philippine Islands (New York City: Harmony Club of America, 1913)

== See also ==
- Hilary Clapp
