= Cameron Josiah Davis =

Episcopalian bishop (1873–1952)

The Right Reverend Cameron Josiah Davis D.D.
- Bishop of Western New York
- Church: Episcopal Church
- Diocese: Western New York
- Elected: October 20, 1929
- In office: 1931–1948
- Predecessor: David Lincoln Ferris
- Successor: Lauriston L. Scaife
- Previous post: Coadjutor Bishop of Western New York (1930-1931)

Orders
- Ordination: June 6, 1897 (deacon); March 16, 1898 (priest) by William David Walker
- Consecration: January 30, 1930 by David Lincoln Ferris

Personal details
- Born: December 13, 1873 Watkins Glen, New York, United States
- Died: June 6, 1952 (aged 78) Buffalo, New York, United States
- Denomination: Anglican
- Parents: Frederick Davies & Frances Hewette
- Spouse: Elizabeth Sacker
- Children: 2

Cameron Josiah Davis (December 13, 1873 – June 6, 1952) was an American prelate who served as Bishop of Western New York between 1931 and 1948.

== Early life and education ==
Davies was born on December 13, 1873, in Watkins Glen, New York, the son of Frederick Davies and Frances Hewette. His paternal grandfather came from Newbury, Berkshire, England and settled on a farm near Rochester, where he was connected with Christ Church, and his father, after teaching school in Missouri and Mississippi, spent all of his life in Watkins Glen, New York. Davies attended the Deveaux School, from where he graduated in 1890, and Trinity College, from where he graduated in 1894. In 1897 he graduated from the General Theological Seminary.

== Ordination ==
In 1897 Davies was ordained deacon and served as assistant to the rector of Trinity Church in Buffalo, New York. After his ordination to the priesthood, Davies became rector of Trinity Church in 1901, where he remained for 28 years.

== Bishop ==
On October 20, 1929, Davies was elected Coadjutor Bishop of Western New York and was consecrated on January 30, 1930. He succeeded as diocesan bishop a year later. During his episcopate he worked tirelessly as president of the Pension Fund Board. he also worked with other religious leaders, notably the Roman Catholic Bishop of Buffalo John A. Duffy and the local Rabbi Joseph L. Fink to establish the so-called 'release time' from school so that pupils can receive religious education. Davies also founded the Buffalo and Erie County Tuberculosis Association. He resigned his bishopric in 1945 as he had reached his maximum age as bishop based on canon law however he remained the head of the diocese until 1948 when a new bishop was elected. He died on June 6, 1952, in Buffalo General Hospital.
