= Lauriston L. Scaife =

Episcopal bishop of Western New York (1907–1970)

The Right Reverend Lauriston Livingston Scaife S.T.D.
- Bishop of Western New York
- Church: Episcopal Church
- Diocese: Western New York
- Elected: January 20, 1948
- In office: 1948–1970
- Predecessor: Cameron Josiah Davis
- Successor: Harold B. Robinson

Orders
- Ordination: May 3, 1938 by John T. Dallas
- Consecration: May 13, 1948 by Henry Knox Sherrill

Personal details
- Born: October 17, 1907 Milton, Massachusetts, United States
- Died: September 19, 1970 (aged 62) Buffalo, New York, United States
- Buried: Hingham Cemetery, Hingham, Massachusetts
- Denomination: Anglican
- Parents: Roger Livingston Scaife & Ethel May Bryant
- Spouse: Eleanor Morris Carnochan
- Children: 2

Lauriston Livingston Scaife (October 17, 1907 – September 19, 1970) was bishop of the Episcopal Diocese of Western New York from 1948 to 1970.

== Early life and education ==
Scaife was born on October 17, 1907, in Milton, Massachusetts, the son of Roger Livingston Scaife (1875-1951) and Ethel May Bryant Scaife (1876-1959). He attended Milton Academy and graduated in 1926 and later Trinity College where he earned his Bachelor of Arts in 1931. He studied at the General Theological Seminary and graduated with a Bachelor of Sacred Theology in 1938. He also gained a Doctor of Divinity from Trinity in 1948.

== Ordination ==
Scaife was ordained deacon on June 7, 1937, by Samuel G. Babcock, Suffragan Bishop of Massachusetts. He was ordained priest on May 3, 1938, by John T. Dallas, Bishop of New Hampshire. Between 1937 and 1938, Scaife served as Master of St Paul's School in Concord, New Hampshire. In 1938 he became the assistant priest of Saint Thomas' Church in New York City. In 1942 he became rector of Trinity Church in Newport, Rhode Island. In 1945 he transferred to Pittsburgh, Pennsylvania to serve as rector of Calvary Church. During WWII, he served as chaplain in the US Navy. He was also a trustee of St Vladimir's Theological Seminary in New York City between 1941 and 1970.

== Bishop ==
On January 20, 1948, Scaife was elected, on the first ballot, as Bishop of Western New York during a special convention held in St Mark's Church in Buffalo, New York. He was consecrated on May 13, 1948, with Presiding Bishop Henry Knox Sherrill as primary consecrator in St. Paul's Cathedral (Buffalo, New York).
