= Harold B. Robinson =

English-American bishop

The Right Reverend Harold Barrett Robinson S.T.D., D.H.L.
- Bishop of Western New York
- Church: Episcopal Church
- Diocese: Western New York
- In office: 1970–1987
- Predecessor: Lauriston L. Scaife
- Successor: David Bowman
- Other post: Assisting Bishop of New York (1989-1993)
- Previous post: Coadjutor Bishop of Western New York (1968-1970)

Orders
- Ordination: December 16, 1946 by W. Bertrand Stevens
- Consecration: February 24, 1968 by John E. Hines

Personal details
- Born: June 14, 1922 Nelson, Lancashire, England
- Died: May 5, 1994 (aged 71) Summit, New Jersey, United States
- Denomination: Episcopalian
- Parents: Harold Robinson & Mary Barrett
- Spouse: Marie A. Little (m. May 17, 1952)
- Children: 4

Harold Barrett Robinson (June 14, 1922 - May 5, 1994) was bishop of the Episcopal Diocese of Western New York from 1970 to 1988, and served as an assisting bishop in the Episcopal Diocese of New York from 1989 to 1993.

== Biography ==
Robinson was born in 1922 in Nelson, Lancashire, England. he came to the United States as an infant United States and grew up in Los Angeles. He became an American citizen in 1945. In 1943, he graduated with a Bachelor of Arts from the University of California in 1946 from the General Theological Seminary.

He was ordained deacon in June 1946 and served as assistant in St Paul's Church in San Diego, California. He was ordained priest on December 16, 1946, by Bishop W. Bertrand Stevens of Los Angeles in St Paul's Church. He then served as rector of the same church St Paul's Church in San Diego until 1962 when he became Dean of St Paul's Cathedral in Buffalo, New York.

In October 1967, Robinson was elected Coadjutor Bishop of Western New York and was consecrated on February 24, 1968, in St Joseph's Cathedral, the Roman Catholic cathedral of Buffalo. He succeeded as diocesan bishop in June 1970. On June 4, 1977, he ordained the first three female priests of the diocese, the Reverends Judith Burrows, Sarah Rieth and Patricia Bird. He also helped incorporate the new revised 1979 Prayer Book which was used throughout the whole diocese by 1987. He retired as Bishop of Western New York in 1988 and served as Assisting Bishop of New York from 1989 to 1993. He died due to leukemia on May 5, 1994, at the Overlook Hospital in Summit, New Jersey. He was survived by his wife Marie and four daughters.
