= J. Michael Garrison =

The Right Reverend J. Michael Garrison
- Bishop of Western New York
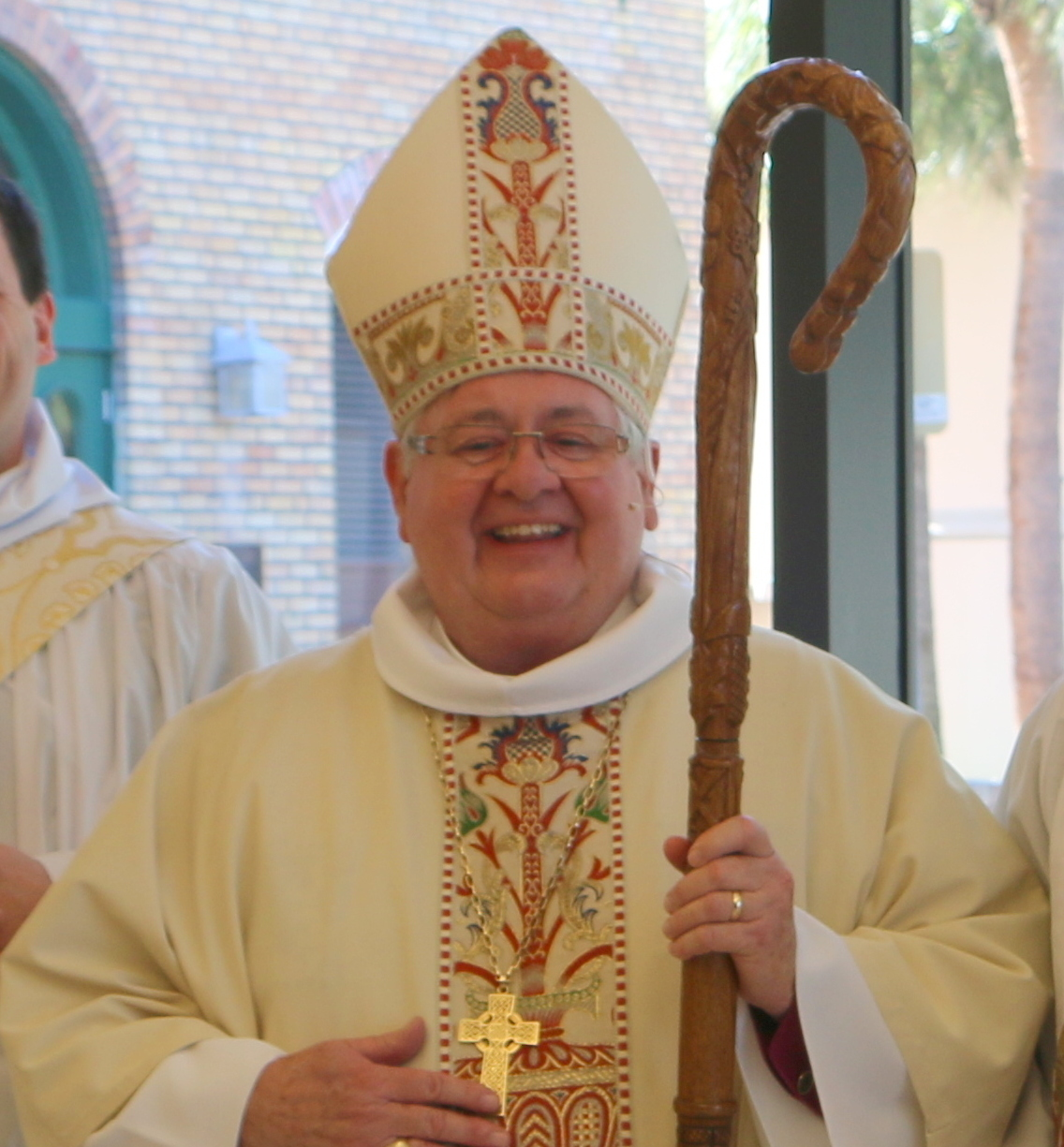
- Garrison in 2015
- Church: Episcopal Church
- Diocese: Western New York
- In office: 1999–2011
- Predecessor: David Bowman
- Successor: Ralph William Franklin

Orders
- Ordination: 1971 by Francis Peter Leipzig
- Consecration: April 24, 1999 by Frank Griswold

Personal details
- Born: April 1945 (age 81) Philadelphia, Pennsylvania, US
- Denomination: Anglican (prev. Roman Catholic)
- Spouse: Carol Sohanney
- Children: 3

J. Michael Garrison (born April 1945) was tenth bishop of the Episcopal Diocese of Western New York, serving from 1999 to 2011.

== Biography ==
Garrison was born in 1945 in Philadelphia, Pennsylvania. He has a bachelor's and a master's of religious education from Pontifical College Josephinum in Columbus, Ohio and an honorary doctorate from General Theological Seminary in New York City. He was ordained a deacon in 1970 and priest in 1971 in the Roman Catholic Church. He joined the Episcopal Church on April 1, 1975, and was received as a deacon on April 12, 1975, and priest on August 25, 1975. He served as assistant at St Paul's Church in Sparks, Nevada before becoming regional vicar. He also served as vicar of St Matthew's Church in Las Vegas, Nevada. He was elected Bishop of Western New York on December 5, 1998. He was consecrated on April 24, 1999.

As bishop he was active in international mission work and annually led a group of diocesan missioners to Honduras to carry out work at an orphanage sponsored by the Episcopal Church. Moreover, he also ordained the first three non-stipendiary locally trained priests in the Diocese of Western Massachusetts. Garrison was also active in youth work and established the annual Bishop's Ball which brings together a number of young people. He retired on April 30, 2011. He is married to Carol Sohanney Garrison and has three children, three stepchildren and two grandchildren.

== See also ==
- List of Episcopal bishops of the United States
- Historical list of the Episcopal bishops of the United States
