= Episcopal Diocese of Western New York =

Episcopal Church diocese in the US

Coordinates: 42°52′58.5″N 78°52′34.0″W

Diocese of Western New York

Location
- Country: United States
- Territory: Cattaraugus, Chautauqua, Erie, Genesee, Niagara, Orleans, Wyoming
- Ecclesiastical province: Province II

Statistics
- Congregations: 52 (2025)
- Members: 4,440 (2025)

Information
- Denomination: Episcopal Church
- Established: 1839
- Cathedral: St Paul's Cathedral
- Language: English

Current leadership
- Bishop: Vacant

Map
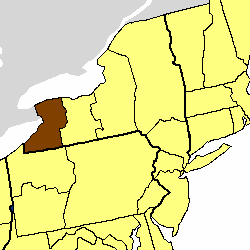
- Location of the Diocese of Western New York

Website
- episcopalwny.org

The Episcopal Diocese of Western New York is the diocese of the Episcopal Church in the United States of America with jurisdiction over the counties of Cattaraugus, Chautauqua, Erie, Genesee, Niagara, Orleans and Wyoming in western New York. It is in Province 2 and its cathedral, St. Paul's Cathedral, is in Buffalo. The diocesan offices are in Tonawanda, New York.

The diocese reported 9,336 members in 2015 and 4,440 members in 2025. Plate and pledge income for the 52 filing congregations of the diocese in 2025 was $4,704,989. Average Sunday attendance (ASA) for 2025 was 1,660 persons. This was a relative decrease from 2,989 ASA in 2016.

== Current bishop ==
Sean W. Rowe served as bishop provisional of Western New York until he became Presiding Bishop of the Episcopal Church. The diocesan convention elected him to this role on October 26, 2018, when it and the convention of the Episcopal Diocese of Northwestern Pennsylvania voted to share a bishop and a staff for five years while they explore a partnership. The partnership ended in 2025 when voted upon.

== List of bishops ==
The bishops of Western New York have been:

1. William H. Delancey, (1839–1865)
  *Arthur C. Coxe, coadjutor bishop (1865)
2. Arthur C. Coxe, (1865–1895)
3. William D. Walker, (1897–1917)
4. Charles H. Brent, (1919–1929)
  * David L. Ferris, suffragan bishop (1920
  *David L. Ferris, coadjutor bishop (1924)
5. David L. Ferris, (1929–1931)
  *Cameron Josiah Davis, coadjutor bishop (1930)
6. Cameron Josiah Davis, (1931–1948)
7. Lauriston L. Scaife, (1948–1970)
  *Harold B. Robinson, coadjutor bishop (1968)
8. Harold B. Robinson, (1970–1987)
  *David C. Bowman, coadjutor bishop (1986)
9. David C. Bowman, (1987–1998)
10. J. Michael Garrison, (1999–2011)
11. R. William Franklin, (2011–2019)

- Sean W. Rowe, as Provisional Bishop (2019–2024)

== See also ==
- List of Succession of Bishops for the Episcopal Church, USA
