= David Bowman (bishop) =

American Episcopal bishop (1932–2015)

The Right Reverend David Charles Bowman M.Div.
- Bishop of Western New York
- Church: Episcopal Church
- Diocese: Western New York
- Elected: 1986
- In office: 1987–1998
- Predecessor: Harold B. Robinson
- Successor: J. Michael Garrison
- Other posts: Assistant bishop, Episcopal Diocese of Ohio

Orders
- Ordination: December 1960 by Nelson M. Burroughs
- Consecration: September 14, 1986 by Edmond L. Browning
- Rank: Bishop

Personal details
- Born: November 15, 1932 Oil City, Pennsylvania, United States
- Died: July 10, 2015 (aged 82) Cleveland, Ohio, United States
- Denomination: Anglican
- Residence: Cleveland, Ohio
- Parents: Robert Bowman & Ella Lee Bowman
- Spouse: Nancy Lou Betts (m. June 30, 1962)
- Children: 3
- Education: Ohio University; Virginia Theological Seminary

David Charles Bowman (November 15, 1932 – July 10, 2015) was a bishop of the Episcopal Church of the United States.

== Early life and education ==
Bowman was born in Oil City, Pennsylvania. He earned a degree from Ohio University in 1955. He served in the United States Army from 1955 to 1957. He then attended Virginia Theological Seminary, graduating with a Masters of Divinity degree in 1960.

== Ordination and ministry ==
In June 1960, Bowman was ordained to the diaconate by Bishop Beverley Tucker. The following December, Bishop Nelson M. Burroughs of Ohio ordained him to the priesthood. Bowman spent the first part of his ordained ministry as an assistant priest at several Episcopal parishes in Ohio. In 1967 he became rector at St. Andrew's Church in Youngstown. He remained as rector of the parish until 1973. He also served as rector of St. James’ Church, Painesville from 1973 to 1980, and Trinity parish in Toledo from 1980 to 1986.

== Bishop ==
Bowman was elected as coadjutor bishop of the Episcopal Diocese of Western New York in 1986. In 1987, Bishop Harold B. Robinson retired and Bowman became Bishop of Western New York. He remained as bishop of the diocese until retiring in 1998.

After retirement Bowman served as Interim Dean of Trinity Cathedral in Cleveland. He then served an interim bishop in Central New York for one year followed by a year as an assisting bishop of Ohio in 2003. He served as an interim dean and president at the Evanston, Illinois-based Seabury Western Seminary. He spent the last ten years of his life as an assisting bishop in Ohio.

Bowman died on July 10, 2015, after a stroke. He was survived by his wife and three children.

== See also ==
- Episcopal Diocese of Ohio
- Episcopal Diocese of Western New York
