= R. William Franklin =

Episcopal Bishop of Western New York (born 1947)

The Right Reverend R. William Franklin
- Bishop of Western New York
- Church: Episcopal Church
- Diocese: Western New York
- Elected: November 20, 2010
- In office: 2011–2019
- Predecessor: J. Michael Garrison

Orders
- Ordination: 2005
- Consecration: April 30, 2011 by Katharine Jefferts Schori
- Rank: Bishop

Personal details
- Born: Ralph William Franklin; January 3, 1947 (age 79) Brookhaven, Mississippi, US
- Denomination: Anglican
- Spouse: Carmela Vircillo (m. 1971)
- Children: 2
- Education: Virginia Theological Seminary

Ralph William Franklin (born January 3, 1947) was the eleventh Bishop of Western New York in the Episcopal Church between 2011 and 2019. In retirement, he is Assisting Bishop of the Episcopal Diocese of Long Island and an adjunct professor at the Union Theological Seminary in New York.

== Biography ==
Franklin was born in on January 3, 1947, in Brookhaven, Mississippi. He graduated with a B.A. from Northwestern University and a PhD in Church History from Harvard University. Prior to ordination, Franklin served as Dean of Berkeley Divinity School at Yale University and professor at the General Theological Seminary and St John's in Minnesota.

== Berkeley Divinity School at Yale ==
The Board of Trustees of Berkeley Divinity School at Yale elected Franklin as its dean effective January 5, 1998. He announced his resignation on December 18, 2001 after an "audit showed that Dr. Franklin used school funds for expenses that included tuition for his daughter at Harvard Medical School." "Amid the controversy, Yale [...] rescinded permission for Berkeley to build a chapel on the main campus of the Yale Divinity School, which may require Berkeley to return $3 million in pledges and gifts to donors." According to the Hartford Courant, Franklin left "his prestigious post for a newly created job with no salary at the Episcopal Diocese of New York, [and] expose[d] Berkeley’s bookkeeping to an attorney general’s investigation." Then-Connecticut State Attorney General Richard Blumenthal, whose office oversaw charitable funds granted to Yale, "said the University responded to Berkeley’s dubious finance procedures by taking matters into its own hands." In 2003, Berkeley Divinity School's finance director filed a suit "charging the Divinity School with breach of contract and slandering her reputation" alleging that "she was following orders from Franklin."

== Ordained Ministry ==
Franklin was made deacon on March 19, 2005 and ordained to the priesthood on September 17, 2005, on both occasions by Mark Sisk, Bishop of New York. After ordination, Franklin also served some time in Italy as associate priest at St Paul's Within the Walls in Rome, associate director of the American Academy in Rome, associate priest of the Anglican Centre in Rome and vicar of the Church of the Resurrection in Orvieto. He returned to the United States and was appointed senior associate priest at St Mark's Church in Philadelphia in July 2010. A few months later without having served as the rector of any church, Franklin was elected Bishop of Western New York on November 20, 2010. He was consecrated on April 30, 2011, by Presiding Bishop Katharine Jefferts Schori.

Franklin retired as Bishop of Western New York in April 2019. Following retirement, he received the inaugural Racial Healing and Transformation Award of the Union of Black Episcopalians.

== Bibliography ==
- (dissertation) Nineteenth-century Churches: The History of a New Catholicism in Württemberg, England, and France (Harvard, 1975)
- (co-author), Virgil Michel: American Catholic (Liturgical Press, 1988) ISBN 9780814615843
- (editor) The Case for Christian Humanism (Eerdmans, 1991) ISBN 9780802806062
- (contributor) Receiving the Vision: The Anglican-Roman Catholic Reality Today: A Study by the Third Standing Committee of the Episcopal Diocesan Ecumenical Officers (Liturgical Press, 1995) ISBN 9780814621738
- (editor) Anglican Orders: Essays on the Centenary of Apostolicae curae, 1896-1996 (Mowbray, 1996) ISBN 9780264674285
- (contributor) Episcopate: The Role of Bishops in a Shared Future (Church Publishing, 2022) ISBN 9781640655539
- (contributor) The Crisis of Christian Nationalism: Report from the House of Bishops Theology Committee (Church Publishing, 2024) ISBN 9781640658035
