= St. Peter's Episcopal Church (Geneva, New York) =

Coordinates: 42°52′14.63″N 76°59′0.72″W

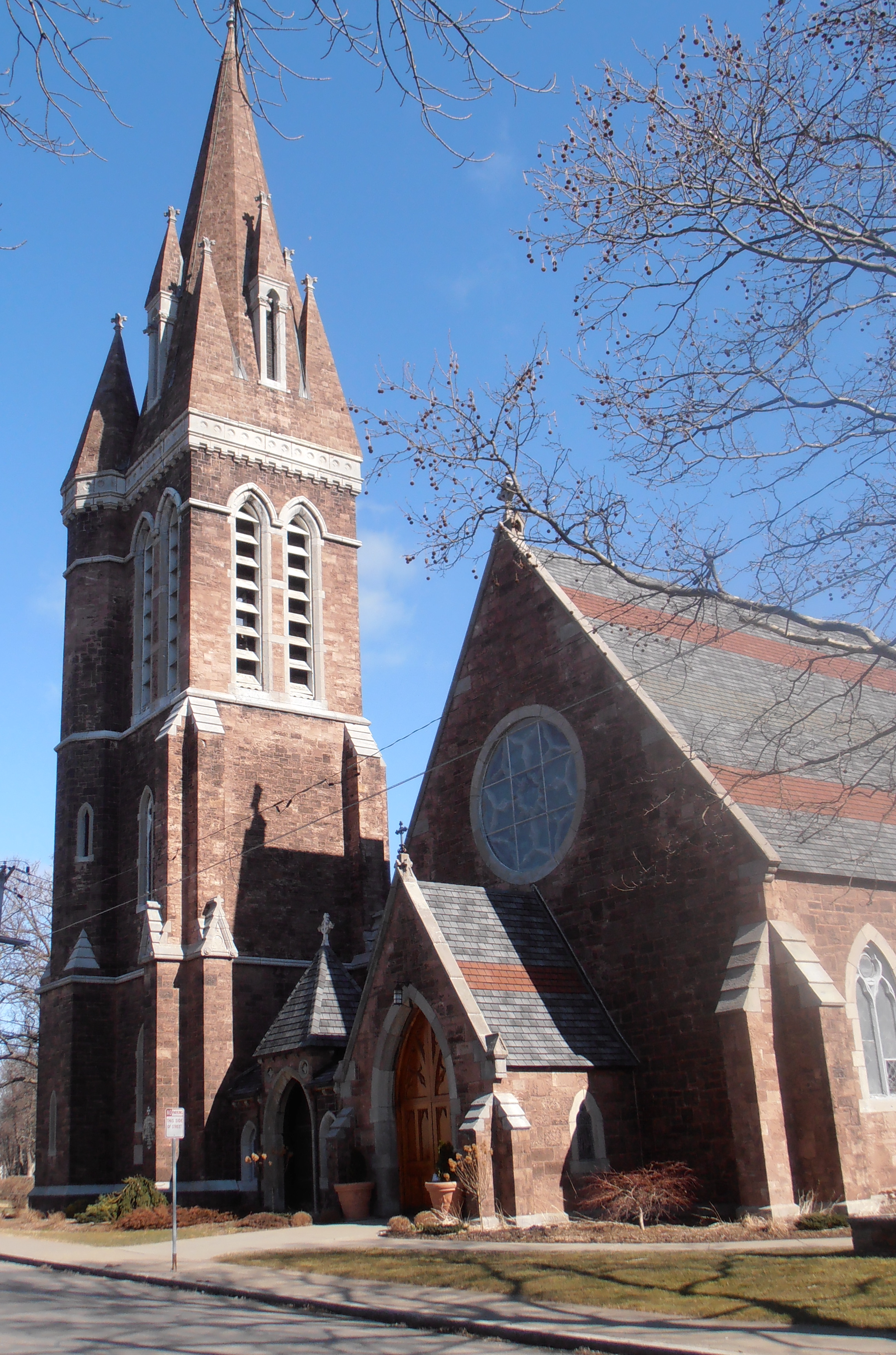

Religion
- Affiliation: The Episcopal Church

Location
- Location: Geneva, New York
- Interactive map of St. Peter's Episcopal Church

Architecture
- Architect: Richard Upjohn
- Type: church
- Style: Gothic Revival
- Completed: 1870

Specifications
- Direction of façade: West
- Materials: Red sandstone, stained glass, slate roof

St Peter's Episcopal Church is an Episcopal Christian church in Geneva, New York. It was established from an initial mission in 1853, and the construction of the current church was completed in 1870, with the addition of the bell tower in 1878 and a complete refurbishment in 1986. An associated arts academy was also added in 1986.

== History ==
The original St. Peter's began as an Episcopal mission established in 1853. Bishop William H. DeLancey appointed Dr. James Rankine, who conducted services in a small wooden chapel in 1861. He served as first rector of the new St. Peter's church from 1861-1896 and also served as the president of Hobart (later Hobart and William Smith Colleges) from 1869 to 1871. Another president of Hobart, Dr. Maunsell Van Rensselaer also served as an early rector of St. Peter's Church.

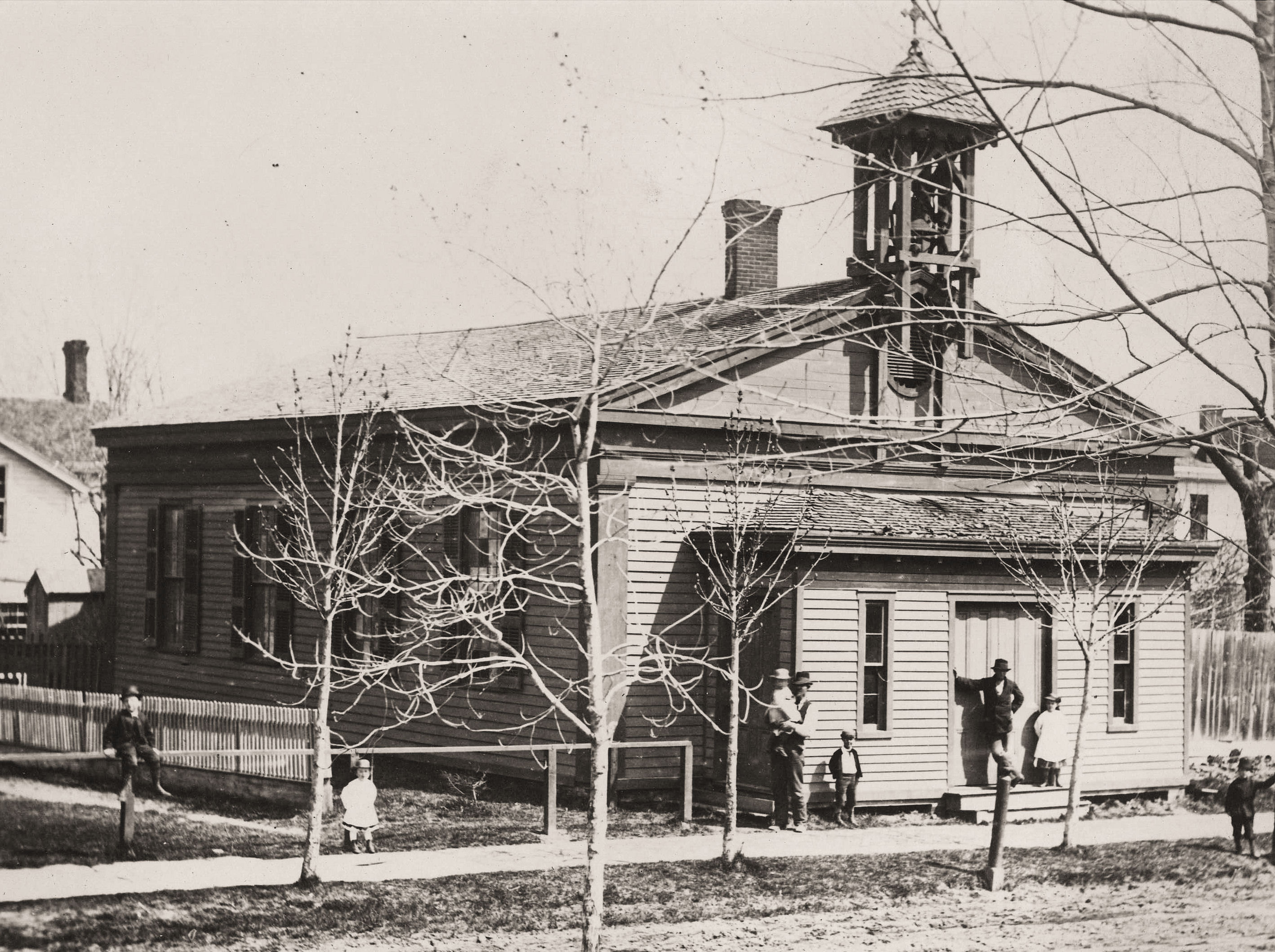
Original wooden St. Peter's Chapel, Geneva, New York

The cornerstone of the current large gothic structure, designed by the noted American architect Richard Upjohn was laid in 1868 and the church construction completed in 1870, when it was consecrated as a memorial to Bishop DeLancey, where his remains are interred. A large bell tower was added in 1878. Most recently, in 1986, the church underwent a complete restoration and the St. Peter's Community Arts Academy was established.

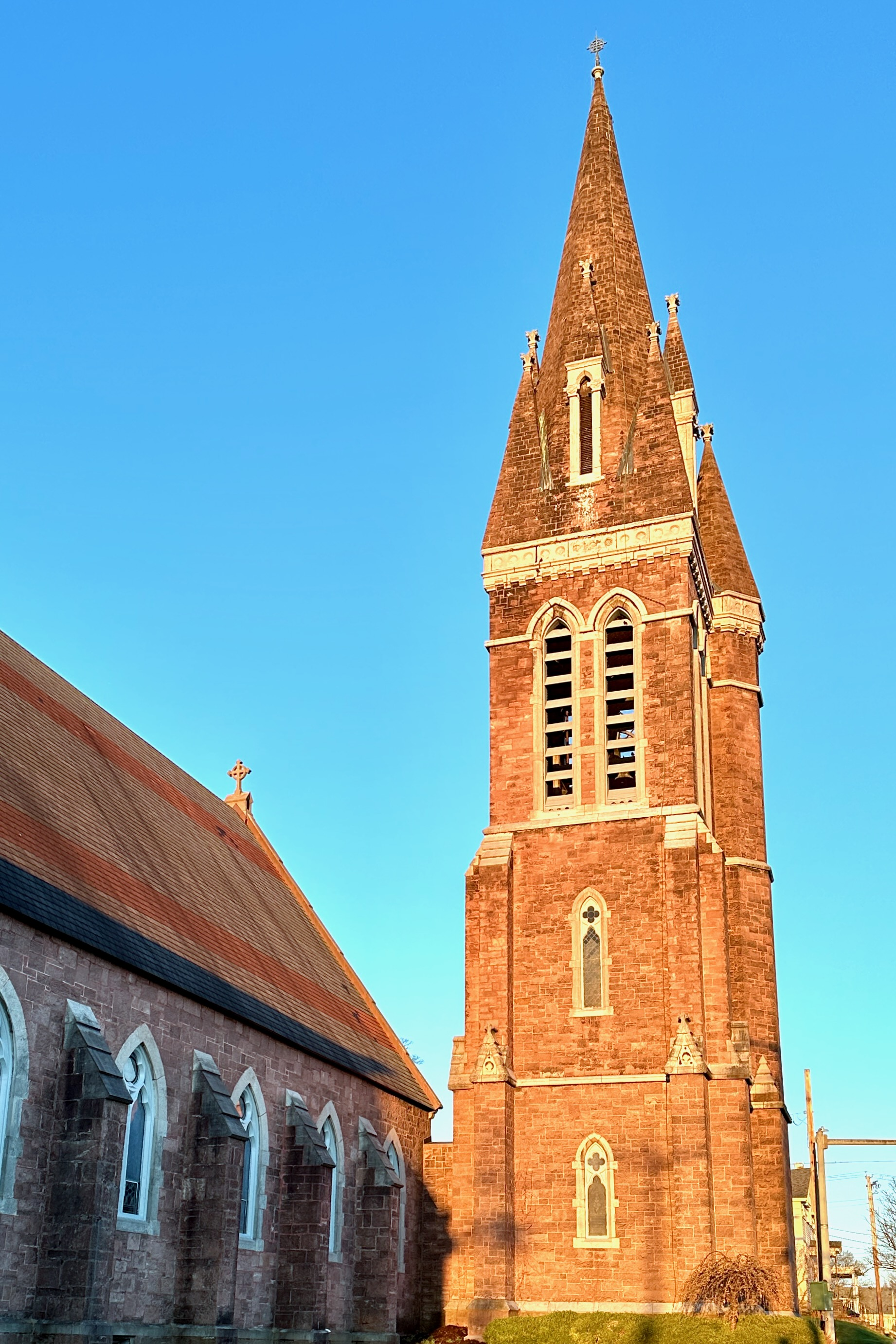
Church bell tower

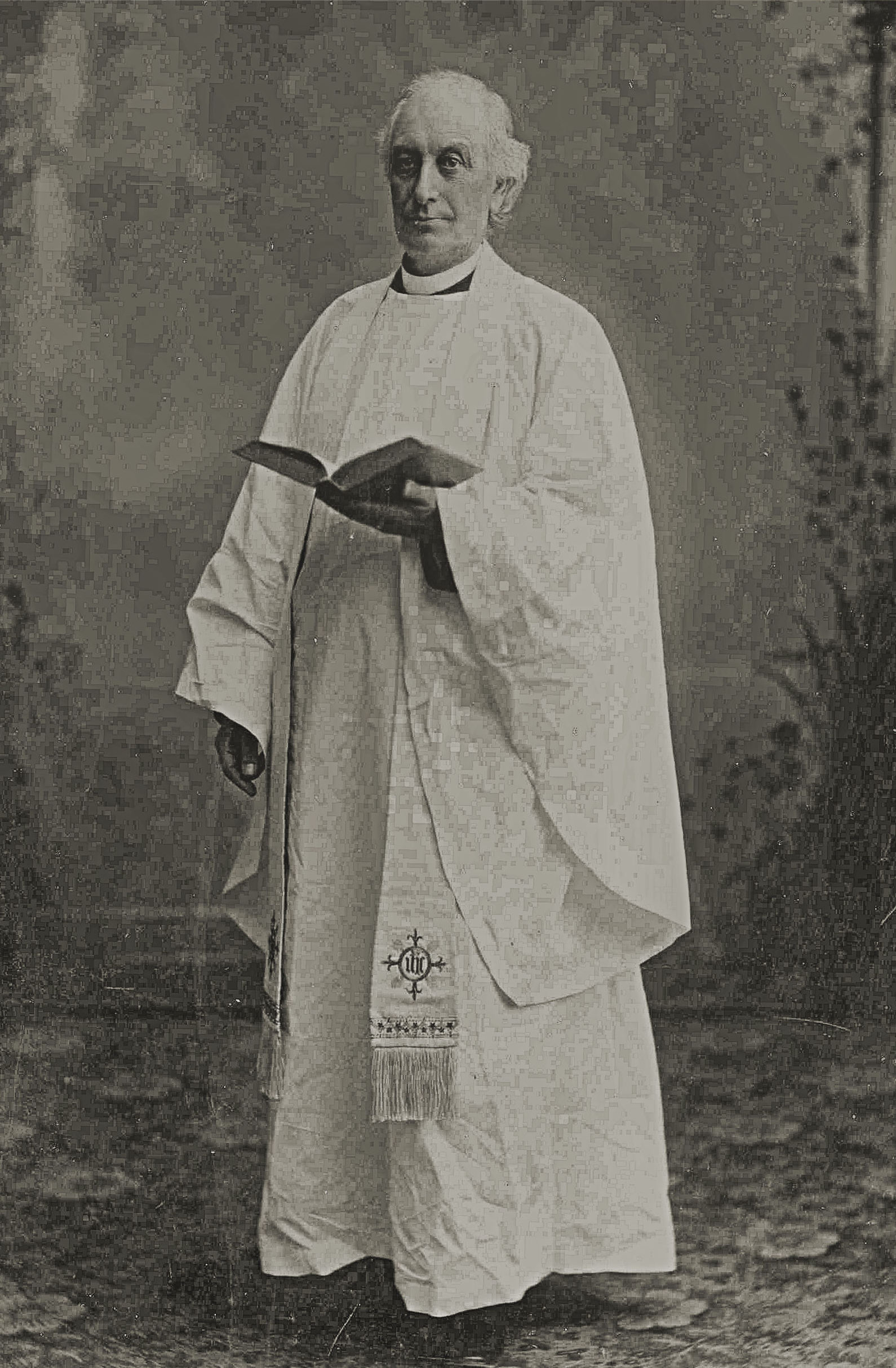
Dr. James Rankine, first rector of St Peter's Church, Geneva, NY

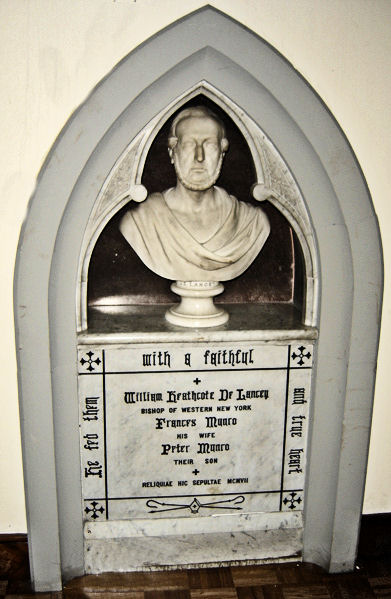
Memorial for Bishop William H. DeLancey St. Peters Church, Geneva NY

== List of rectors ==
- The Reverend James Rankine, 1861 - 1896
- The Reverend Maunsell VanRensselaer 1870 - 1871
- The Reverend John Brewster Hubbs 1897 - 1914
- The Reverend Kenneth Bray 1914 - 1924
- The Reverend Ross R. Calvin 1925 - 1926
- The Reverend Herbert Hawkins 1926 - 1928
- The Reverend Howard Hassinger 1928 - 1944
- The Reverend Norman Remmel 1944 - 1972
- The Reverend Smith Lain 1972 - 1980
- The Reverend James H. Adams 1981–present
