= William H. DeLancey =

American bishop (1797–1865)

The Right Reverend William H. DeLancey
- Bishop of Western New York
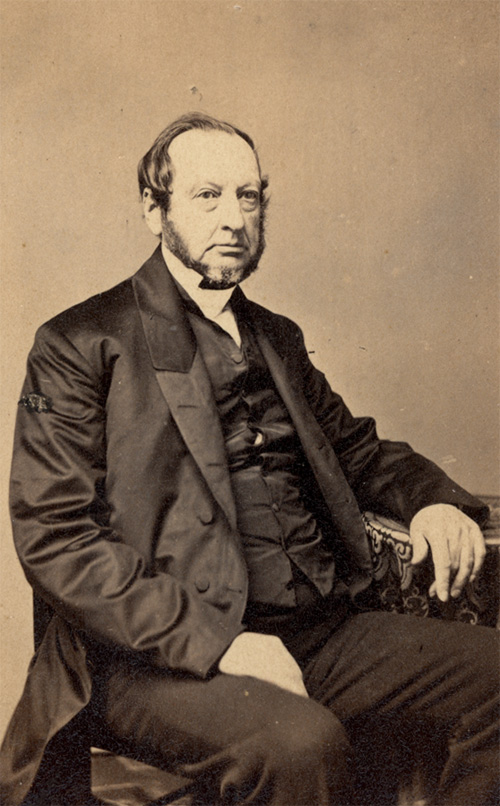
- Church: Episcopal Church
- Diocese: Western New York
- Elected: November 2, 1838
- In office: 1839–1865
- Successor: Arthur Cleveland Coxe

Orders
- Ordination: March 6, 1822 by John Henry Hobart
- Consecration: May 9, 1839 by Alexander Viets Griswold

Personal details
- Born: October 8, 1797 Mamaroneck, New York, United States
- Died: April 5, 1865 (aged 67) Geneva, New York, United States
- Buried: St. Peter's Episcopal Church (Geneva, New York)
- Denomination: Anglican
- Parents: John Peter DeLancey & Elizabeth Floyd
- Spouse: Frances Munro
- Children: 8
- Education: Yale College
- Signature: William H. DeLancey's signature

William Heathcote DeLancey (October 8, 1797 – April 5, 1865) was a bishop of the Episcopal Church in the United States of America and the sixth provost of the University of Pennsylvania. DeLancey was known as a High Churchman, and served as the first bishop of the Episcopal Diocese of Western New York. He was elected a trustee of the University of Pennsylvania and then as the ninth provost (chief academic officer and highest professional position) of the university (1828 to 1834).

== Family and education ==
DeLancey was born at Mamaroneck, New York, into a celebrated New York family descended from Caleb Heathcote. He was the son of John Peter DeLancey, a Revolutionary War soldier, and his wife, Elizabeth Floyd. His sister married James Fenimore Cooper. DeLancey graduated from Yale College in 1817 and later studied divinity with Bishop John Henry Hobart of New York. He served in several positions in New York before being ordained to the ministry in 1822.

He married Frances Munro, daughter of Peter Jay Munro, in 1820. They had five sons and three daughters. Their eldest son, Edward Floyd DeLancey, was president of the New York Genealogical and Biographical Society.

== Ministry ==
After his ordination, DeLancey took a position in Philadelphia as general assistant to William White (Bishop of Pennsylvania). He held various clerical offices in Philadelphia and, in 1826, was elected a trustee of the University of Pennsylvania. Delancey was elected provost of the university in 1828, continuing in that office until 1834. The next three years showed a distinct improvement in the number of students and in other areas.

In 1829, DeLancy was elected as a member of the American Philosophical Society.

On November 2, 1838, DeLancey was elected first Bishop of the newly created Episcopal Diocese of Western New York. He was the 34th bishop of the ECUSA, and was consecrated by bishops Alexander Viets Griswold, Henry Ustick Onderdonk, and Benjamin Treadwell Onderdonk. DeLancey remained in that position for more than 25 years, residing in the town of Geneva. In 1852, he attended the fifteenth anniversary of the Society for the Propagation of the Gospel in Foreign Parts as one of the two representatives of the American House of Bishops, being the first American Bishop to be recognized officially as one of their own body by the Anglican Bishops.

DeLancey was active in matters of church organization and legislation, and was instrumental in placing Hobart College and several other educational institutions on a firm basis. He was also involved in the establishment of St. Peter's Episcopal Church (Geneva, New York), which was later dedicated as the DeLancey Memorial Church. He received the following honorary degrees: Doctor of Divinity from Yale in 1827, Doctor of Laws from Union College in 1849 and Doctor of Civil Laws from Oxford University, in 1852.

He died in Geneva, New York on April 5, 1865, where his remains were interred in St. Peter's Episcopal Church.

== Notes ==
Episcopal Church (USA) titles
New title	1st Bishop of Western New York; 1839–1865	Succeeded by Arthur Cleveland Coxe
