= William David Walker =

19th and 20th-century American Episcopal bishop

The Right Reverend William David Walker D.D., LL.D., D.C.L., S.T.D.
- Bishop of Western New York
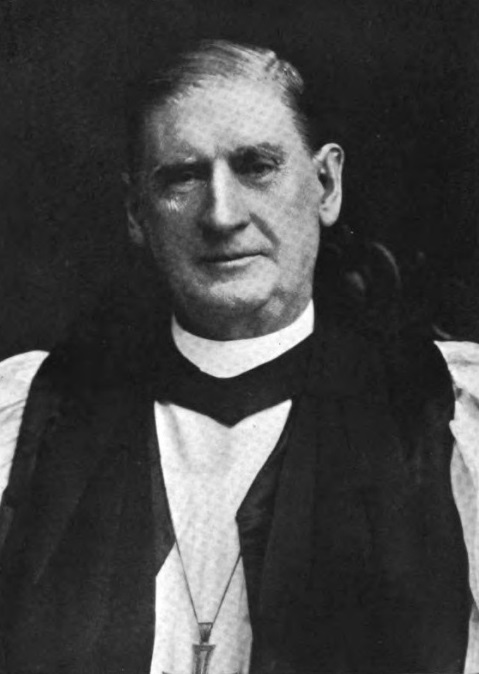
- Bishop Walker
- Church: Episcopal Church
- Diocese: Western New York
- In office: 1897–1917
- Predecessor: Arthur Cleveland Coxe
- Successor: Charles Brent
- Previous post: Bishop of North Dakota (1883–1896)

Orders
- Ordination: June 29, 1863 by Horatio Potter
- Consecration: December 20, 1883 by Thomas M. Clark

Personal details
- Born: June 29, 1839 New York City, New York, United States
- Died: May 2, 1917 (aged 77) Buffalo, New York, United States
- Denomination: Anglican
- Spouse: Bertha Barbara Bach

William David Walker (June 29, 1839 – May 2, 1917) was consecrated as the first missionary bishop of the Episcopal Church's Missionary District of North Dakota on December 20, 1883. He became the third bishop of Western New York in 1897 and held this position until his death in 1917.

== Early life and education ==
Walker was born in New York on June 29, 1839. He graduated from Columbia University and the General Theological Seminary.

== Marriage ==
Walker Married Bertha Barbara Bach, of 44 E 80th Street in New York City, on March 4, 1905 at the Church of the Heavenly Rest in New York City. The bride was the daughter of Jacques Brach, a partner in the Kranich & Bach Piano company of New York City.

== Ministry ==
During his ministry, Walker held three positions: Vicar of Calvary Chapel, New York City, 1862–1883; first missionary bishop of North Dakota, 1883–1896; third bishop of Western New York, 1896–1917.

== First Missionary Bishop of North Dakota ==
Walker was consecrated as the first Missionary Bishop of the Missionary District of North Dakota on December 20, 1883, in Calvary Church, New York.

When Walker came to North Dakota, the district consisted of "eighteen churches, and about thirty-five missions." In the missions, worship services were being held in space that could be found. Walker noticed that dozens of hamlets could be reached by railroad. In some of them there was no space large enough for a congregation of twenty people.

=== Cathedral car ===
Walker sought an answer to this lack of worship space. Having learned about a Russian Orthodox chapel car which was used on the Trans-Siberian Railway, Walker decided to procure a similar car to provide a place for worship in the many places on the railroads where there was no church building. Walker also "felt that to erect churches in towns, until their stability was assured, would be a waste of capital." He implemented his plan by first raising the cost from friends back east and, then, contracting with the Pullman Palace Car Company to build it. The chapel car could seat eighty persons on portable chairs. The words "The Church of the Advent" and "The Cathedral Car of North Dakota" were painted on the sides of the car.

The railroads took the Cathedral Car to the various hamlets. The bishop would have placards announcing its coming and the time of worship posted before he arrived. This pattern was followed across North Dakota. The Cathedral Car covered seventy thousand square miles. Often, the Cathedral Car could not accommodate all the people who wanted to attend worship, so there had to be “multiple services.” Besides regular worship, there were marriages and funerals.

People in the hamlets were impressed by "compactness, dignity, and simple churchly beauty" of the Chapel Car. They were also impressed by what Walker did. He lived in the car, did his own cooking, and cleaned both his living quarters and the chapel. Often he was the organist for services.

After Walker left, the Cathedral Car was sold and scrapped in 1901. Its material and furnishing were used by various stationary churches in the district.

After Walker accepted his call to serve as Diocesan Bishop of the Diocese of Western New York in 1896, his successor Bishop James Dow Morrison praised Walker's missionary work, but he expressed dismay over Walker's decision to use funds for the Cathedral Car rather than for traditional buildings.

== Bishop of Western New York ==
On October 6, 1896, a special convention of the Diocese of Western New York met for the election of a new bishop. Walker was elected.

Walker was “enthroned as Bishop of Western New York on December 23, 1896." He was the third bishop of the diocese, and he held this position until his death in 1917.

=== Characteristics as bishop ===
As a bishop, Walker controlled his clergy "with an iron hand." In contrast to his successor Charles Brent, who labored for Christian unity, Walker opposed association with other Christian denominations. In his address to the 1914 Convention of the Diocese of Western New York, in the section on "Christian Unity," Walker said, "in my opinion while divided Christendom remains, separated sects are better apart—each peaceably working out its own salvation."

Walker was noted for his "frankness and simplicity," and he was known as "a workhorse." His report to the May 1898 Diocesan Convention included 1494 confirmations, three priests and seven deacons ordained. When he made his parish visitations, he met with the parish vestries. These meetings gave Walker "a good overall perspective of the Diocese."

During the first seven years of Walker's episcopacy, parishes increased from 126 to 151 and the number of communicants increased from 19,000 to 23,000. The number of clergy rose from 120 to 128. Missionary offerings tripled.

Walker was a "staunch conservative." He opposed giving women a vote in parish elections. As another example of his conservative proclivity, Walker deposed the Rev. Algernon Sidney Crapsey on December 4, 1906. Crapsey had been charged, tried and convicted for heresy. The charge was based on Crapsey's 1905 book Religion and Politics. In the book, he urged the church to work for social reform. He also questioned traditional interpretations of the Trinity and the Virgin Birth.

== Honors ==
Walker received two honorary degrees: Doctor of Divinity (D.D.) and Doctor of Laws (LL.D.).

== Death ==
While still Bishop of Western New York, after a "brief illness," Walker died at his home on May 2, 1917.

The Annual Council of the diocese met on May 15 fewer than two weeks after Walker's death. At the council, the Standing Committee of the diocese unanimously adopted a minute extolling Walker's service. The minute ended with these words: "he faithfully served the Church to which he adhered and never failed in his fidelity and energy to work for those things which he believed were for the ultimate good of the Church. The labors of the last week of his life proved his fidelity, interest and energy, and hastened his call to the Life Eternal."

== Works ==
Comfort and Counsel: Sermons by the Late Right Reverend William David Walker (Buffalo, N. Y.: Baker, Jones, and Co., 1918). The sermons were compiled by Walker's wife.
