= David Lincoln Ferris =

Priest, suffragan bishop, and bishop coadjutor (1864–1947)

The Right Reverend David Lincoln Ferris D.D., LL.D., L.H.D.
- Bishop of Rochester
- Church: Episcopal Church
- Diocese: Rochester
- Elected: December 1931
- In office: 1931–1938
- Successor: Bartel H. Reinheimer
- Previous posts: Suffragan Bishop of Western New York (1920–1924); Coadjutor Bishop of Western New York (1924–1929); Bishop of Western New York (1929–1931)

Orders
- Ordination: October 9, 1894 by Frederic Dan Huntington
- Consecration: October 13, 1920 by Charles Brent

Personal details
- Born: December 31, 1864 Peekskill, New York, United States
- Died: June 9, 1947 (aged 82) Rochester, New York, United States
- Denomination: Anglican
- Parents: James Augustus Ferris and Catherine Sophia Clark
- Spouse: Mary Eversley Stuart (m. 1893)
- Children: 1

David Lincoln Ferris (December 31, 1864 – June 9, 1947), was the fifth Bishop of the Episcopal Diocese of Western New York, (1929–1931) and later the first Bishop of Rochester from 1931 till 1938. Prior to that he had served as a Priest, Suffragan Bishop, and Bishop Coadjutor in that diocese.

== Family and Education ==
David Lincoln Ferris was born on December 31, 1864, in Peekskill, New York, United States. His father was James Augustus Ferris and his mother was Catherine Sophia (Clark) Ferris.

Ferris married Mary Eversley Stuart of Norwalk, Connecticut on October 24, 1893. They had one son, the Rev. Eversley Stuart Ferris. The son married Martha Boynton on June 22, 1934. From 1926 to 1931, he was Vicar of All Saints' Church, Lockport, N. Y.

In 1921, Mrs. Ferris became the vice-president of the Western New York Diocesan Girls' Friendly Society.

=== Education ===
Ferris did his education in three stages: preparatory, undergraduate, and postgraduate:

- His preparatory education was done in the Peekskill Military Academy in Peekskill, New York, United States and Cuyaga Lake (New York) Military Academy.
- His undergraduate education was done at Hobart College from which he received a Bachelor of Arts degree in 1888 and a Master of Arts in 1891.
- His postgraduate education was done at the Berkeley Divinity School, Middletown, Connecticut from which he received a degree in divinity in 1893, a degree that prepared him for his ordination.

== Ministry ==
Ferris served as a Priest in four dioceses.

Diocese of Central New York
Ferris was ordained by Bishop Frederic Dan Huntington of the Episcopal Diocese of Central New York as a Deacon in 1893 and as a Priest in 1894.

From 1893 to 1896, Ferris served as Curate and then as Rector of St. Matthew’s Church, Horseheads, New York and St. John's Church, Big Flats, New York.

Diocese of Connecticut
From 1896 to 1900, Ferris served as Senior Curate of St. John’s Church, Stamford, Connecticut.

Diocese of Pittsburgh
From 1900 to 1912, Ferris served as Associate Rector of Calvary Episcopal Church in Pittsburgh, Pennsylvania. From 1905 to 1912, he was Secretary of the Standing Committee of the Diocese of Pittsburgh, 1905–1912.

Diocese of Western New York
From 1912 to 1920, Ferris served as Rector of Christ Church, Rochester, New York. While in Rochester, was elected to serve as a Clerical Deputy to the 1916 and 1919 General Conventions of the Episcopal Church.

== Bishop ==
Ferris served his whole episcopate in the Diocese of Western New York.

Suffragan Bishop
On May 18, 1920, Charles Brent, the diocesan bishop, requested a suffragan bishop. He said that he believed it to be "necessary for both economy and effectiveness". The Diocesan Convention approved Brent's request and on May 27, 1920, held an election. There were two nominations and Ferris was elected. Out of the seventy-five clerical votes cast, he received forty-one. Out of forty-one lay votes cast, he received twenty-five. Ferris served as Bishop Suffragan from 1920 to 1924.

Ferris' consecration was on October 13, 1920, in Christ Church, Rochester, where for eight years he had been the rector. Brent presided over the ceremony. During the luncheon after the ceremony, Ferris was welcomed "by representatives on behalf of the Bishops, the clergy, the Ministerial Union of Rochester, and the laity and the Diocese of Pittsburgh in which Ferris had served from 1900 to 1912.

On October 24, 1920, Ferris received the honorary degree of Doctor of Sacred Theology from Hobart College. At the ceremony, Ferris preached. Ferris had been a member of the Board of Trustees since 1913.

Ferris shared with Brent parish visitations. He also conducted "Preaching Missions." He chaired the National Committee which produced the annual Church Calendar and Bible Readings. Just a short time after his consecration, Brent said, "Bishop Ferris has already established a relationship with you that is happy and strong. What he has been to me, I alone can fully appreciate." As Brent increasingly depended on Ferris, he thought of him "as his co-laborer in every respect". During Brent's many absences from the diocese, Ferris "had full responsibility".

Bishop Coadjutor
The Diocesan Convention of 1924 granted Brent's request for a Bishop Coadjutor. When the Convention reconvened for the election on May 2, 1924, at St. Paul's Church, Rochester, Ferris was the only nomination and was elected Bishop Coadjutor. The vote was unanimous except for a blank Lay vote and a blank Clerical vote. Brent instituted Ferris as Bishop Coadjutor in Christ Church, Hornell, N. Y. on October 24, 1924.

During the last years before he died, Brent was in poor health and often away from the diocese. Therefore, Ferris had to take on Brent's visitations and engagements as well as bear "full responsibility for the Diocese". These added burdens threatened to break his health.

When the news came of Brent's death, Ferris was in Saint Paul's Cathedral in Buffalo as a Lenten noon-day preacher. As he told the congregation the news, he was crying.

Diocesan Bishop
In 1929, Ferris became the Diocesan Bishop following the death of Brent on March 27, 1929. Brent had served as the Diocesan Bishop since 1918. Ferris later said that in serving with Brent, he was serving with "one of the greatest men in the Episcopate".

Ferris continued diocesan policies for "all intents and purposes" unchanged. He had worked with Brent in establishing them,

Ferris called a Special Convention of the Diocese for October 29, 1929. It was held at S. Paul's Cathedral, Buffalo, N. Y. The convention's agenda was the electing of a Bishop Coadjutor. From the first vote the Rev. Cameron J. Davis led in the number of votes. However, he did not obtain a majority of both Orders until the fourth ballot. Davis was instituted as Bishop Coadjutor in 1930.

When Ferris addressed the Diocesan Convention in 1930, he expressed his appreciation for Davis. He said that Davis had "lifted many burdens" from his shoulders. Also, he reported that Davis was gaining the love of the diocese both as "an able administrator" and as a pastor.

The beginning of Ferris as Diocesan Bishop and Davis Bishop Coadjutor working work together coincided with the Wall Street crash of 1929 which was followed by the long Great Depression. This depression "occasioned serious reduction of Diocesan income". Programs, salaries, and other expenses had to be reduced each year.

Ferris served as Diocesan Bishop of Western New York until its division in 1932. At that time he became Bishop of the Diocese of Rochester. He resigned in 1938.

Description of Ferris
George Sherman Burrows, the diocese's historian described Ferris: Ferris was primarily a pastor. He encouraged family religion and urged families to have an altar in their homes. He said that "the way to redeem society is through family religion". Ferris was a leading advocate for "Bible Teaching and Expository Preaching". He said that he would prefer to be thought of "as a teaching parson than a preaching parson". As a pastor, Ferris visited sick clergy, called on families of prominent lay leaders who died, and "regularly visited homes for the poor and aged".

== Memberships, positions, and honors ==
Ferris held a variety of memberships, positions, and honors.

Memberships

- Member Phi Beta Kappa
- Theta Delta Chi
- 33º degree Mason
- Knights Templar As a Freemason, Ferris was "active and prominent" in the York and Scottish Rites. This was recognized on October 5, 1924, when other members of the Order presented him with "a richly wrought pastoral staff".
- Republican Party

While in Rochester

- University Club while in Rochester, N.Y.
- Genesee Valley, Chamber of Commerce.

Positions

- Vice president trustees Protestant Episcopal Church Home, Rochester.
- Episcopal Church Home (Church Charity Foundation), Buffalo, N. Y.
- Trustee: General Theological Seminary.
- Trustee: Berkeley Divinity School, Middletown, Connecticut.
- Ferris was the Honorary President of the Fifth Catholic Congress of the Episcopal Church, which met in Buffalo October 28–30, 1930.

Honorary degrees
Ferris was awarded the following honorary degrees:

- Doctor of Sacred Theology (S.T.D.) by Hobart College in 1920.
- Doctor of Laws (LL.D,) in 1920.
- Doctor of Humane Letters (L.H.D.) by St. Stephen’s College in 1921.
- Doctor of Divinity (D.D.) by Berkeley Divinity School in 1921.

== Death and legacy ==
Ferris' wife died on February 28, 1943, in Rochester, N. Y. She was seventy-six.

Ferris himself died on June 9, 1947, in Rochester, N. Y. at the age of eighty-two.

== Works ==
- Ferris wrote "many articles on Bible Study and Bible Reading".
- He wrote the Introduction to Charles Henry Brent: Everybody's Bishop (Morehouse Publishing Co., 1932).
- He published the books "Meditations in the Gospel According to St. Mark" (Pittsburgh, Spahr and Ritscher, Printers, 1909) and "Studies in the Gospel According to St. Mark."
