= Arthur Cleveland Coxe =

American bishop (1818–1896

The Right Reverend Arthur Cleveland Coxe D.D., LL.D.
- Bishop of Western New York
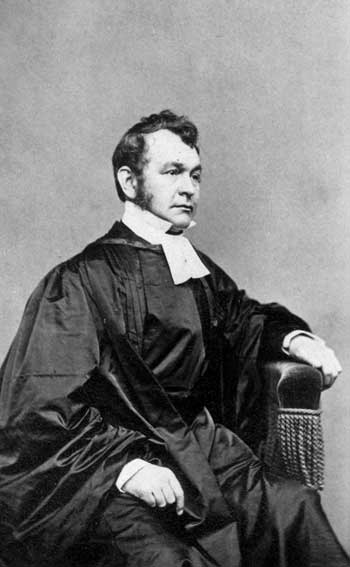
- Church: Episcopal Church
- Diocese: Western New York
- Elected: August 19, 1864
- In office: 1865–1895
- Predecessor: William H. DeLancey
- Successor: William David Walker
- Previous post: Coadjutor Bishop of Western New York (1865)

Orders
- Ordination: September 25, 1842 by Thomas Church Brownell
- Consecration: January 4, 1865 by John Henry Hopkins

Personal details
- Born: May 10, 1818 Mendham Borough, New Jersey, United States
- Died: July 20, 1896 (aged 78) Clifton Springs, New York, United States
- Buried: Washington Street Cemetery
- Denomination: Anglican (prev. Presbyterian)
- Parents: Samuel Hanson Cox & Abiah Hyde Cleveland
- Spouse: Katharine Cleveland Hyde (m. Sept. 21, 1841)
- Signature: Arthur Cleveland Coxe's signature

Arthur Cleveland Coxe (May 10, 1818 – July 20, 1896) was the second Episcopal bishop of Western New York. He used Cleveland as his given name and is often referred to as A. Cleveland Coxe.

== Biography ==
He was the son of the Reverend Samuel Hanson Cox and Abiah Hyde Cox née Cleveland, but changed the spelling of the family name. He was born at Mendham, New Jersey, May 10, 1818. On his mother's side he was a grandson of the Rev. Aaron Cleveland, an early poet of Connecticut. His parents moved to New York in 1820, and he received his education there.

Coxe was prepared for college under the private tuition of Professor George Bush. He entered the University of the City of New York, and graduated in 1838. During his freshman year he wrote a poem, The Progress of Ambition, and in 1837 published Advent, a Mystery, a poem after the manner of the religious dramas of the Middle Ages. In 1838 appeared Athwold, a Romaunt, and Saint Jonathan, the Lay of the Scald, designed as the commencement of a semi-humorous poem, in the Don Juan style.

Coxe in 1841 became a student in the General Theological Seminary, New York. While at this institution he delivered a poem, Athanasion, before the Alumni of Washington College, Hartford, at the Commencement in 1840. In the same year he published Christian Ballads, a collection of poems, suggested for the most part by the holy seasons and services of his church. The volume went into numerous editions, so much so that "their place in American literature has long been secure."

He was ordained deacon on June 27, 1841 by Bishop Benjamin T. Onderdonk in St. Paul's Chapel, priest on September 25, 1842, at St. John's Episcopal Church (Hartford, Connecticut). As a deacon he took charge of St. Anne's church, Morrisania, where he wrote his poem, Halloween, privately printed in 1842.

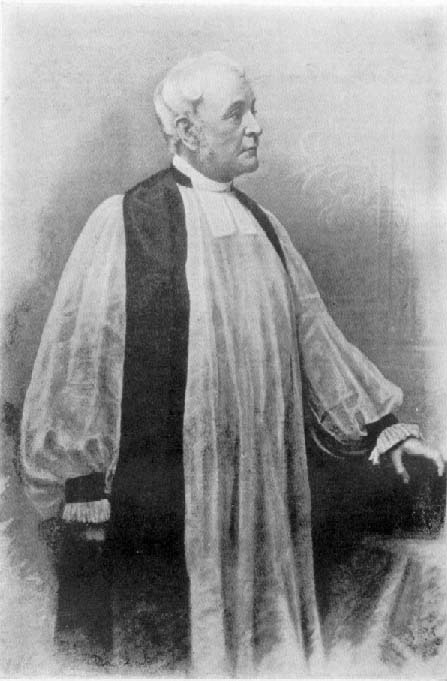
The Right Reverend Arthur Cleveland Coxe

He then became rector of St. John's Episcopal Church (Hartford, Connecticut), from 1842 to 1854. While there he published a dramatic poem Saul: a mystery, of the same kind as his earlier productions but at much greater length. But it was condemned by reviewers including Edgar Allan Poe.

He also published an Apology for the English Bible against revisions of the Authorised Version by the American Bible Society, and the work ultimately prompted the suppression of these revised versions. Here as elsewhere he was hostile to any revised translation of the Bible.

Anglican Orders was a series of papers, originally contributed to the Paris journal, Union Chrétienne. An open letter to Pius IX (1869) was in answer to the brief convoking the first Vatican Council, and was widely read and translated into many languages in Europe. L'Episcopat de l'Occident was published at Paris in 1872 and contained a history of the Church of England and a refutation of Roman Catholic attacks.

He became rector of Grace Church, Baltimore, in 1854–1863. While there he was elected bishop of Texas, but declined. He received a doctorate in divinity from St. James College, Hagerstown, Maryland, in 1856; again from Trinity, Hartford, Connecticut, in 1868, and again from Durham University in the United Kingdom in 1888. He received a doctorate of laws from Kenyon College, Gambier, Ohio, in 1868.

He was rector of Calvary Church, New York City, in 1863. Then he went to Trinity Church, Geneva, New York, on January 4, 1865. On January 4, 1865, he became bishop coadjutor to the first bishop of Western New York, and on April 5, on the death of bishop De Lancey, second bishop of Western New York. In 1868 he agreed to the division of the diocese, to create the diocese of Central New York.

During his time the diocese prospered. In 1868 there were 69 resident clergy and 76 parishes, and 6,296 families associated with them. The value of the church property was about $1m. In 1890 there were 123 resident clergy and 133 parishes, while the number of families was 16,699, and the property was worth $2.3m.

In 1872 the missions of the church in Haiti were placed under the control of his diocese. Late in the year he visited the island, consecrating a church, ordaining six priests and five deacons, holding a convocation of the clergy and administering confirmation to a large number of candidates. He retained the charge of the Haitian church until the consecration of its own bishop, James Theodore Holly, in 1874.

Bishop Coxe wrote spirited defences of Anglican orders. He entered controversy with various contemporary Roman Catholic clergymen, such as Bishop Stephen V. Ryan of the Diocese of Buffalo, who, in 1880, published against Coxe Claims of a Protestant episcopal bishop to apostolical succession and valid orders disproved.... He strongly opposed the initiative for a Church Congress that would be a forum for debating current social questions among different parties in the church.

Among Coxe's own theological works were: The Criterion, (1866); Apollos, or the Way of God, (1873); and The Institutes of Christian History, (1887). He also translated a work by the Abbe Labord, on the Impossibility of the Immaculate Conception, with notes. He also edited the United States Ante-Nicene Fathers series of early Christian texts. Other works included Impressions of England (1855), originally contributed to his New York Church Journal.

Coxe designed the seal of Hobart College and the main administrative building of the college is named in his honor.

He died at Clifton Springs, New York on July 20, 1896, and was buried in Geneva, New York. A memorial volume was in preparation at the time of the Buffalo Historical Society article.

== Sources ==
- Cyclopaedia of American Literature: Embracing Personal and Critical Notices of Authors, and Selections from Their Writings. From the Earliest Period to the Present Day; with Portraits, Autographs, and Other Illustrations By Evert Augustus Duyckinck, George Long Duyckinck. Published by C. Scribner, 1856. Online at Google Books, p. 656 is an article on Coxe.
- A Compendium of American Literature, Chronologically Arranged: With Biographical Sketches of the Authors By Charles Dexter Cleveland Published by J.A. Bancroft, 1865. P.707f is on Coxe.
- Publications of the Buffalo Historical Society. By Buffalo Historical Society (Buffalo, N.Y.) Published by Bigelow Brothers, 1896. Online at Google Books, p. 381-2 has an obituary of Coxe; p. 355-358 covers his record as an author.
- The Bishops of the American Church, Past and Present: Sketches, Biographical and Bibliographical, of the Bishops of the American Church, with a Preliminary Essay on the Historic Episcopate and Documentary Annals of the Introduction of the Anglican Line of Succession Into America. By William Stevens Perry. Published by The Christian literature co., 1897, who published the Ante-Nicene Fathers. P. 159f. Includes a detailed bibliography.
