= Edward Howard Griggs =

American lecturer (1868–1951)

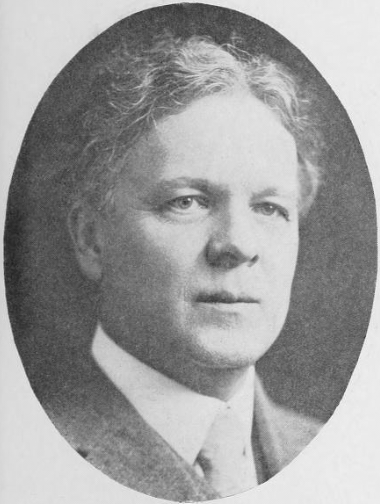
Edward Howard Griggs circa 1914

Edward Howard Griggs (January 9, 1868 – June 6, 1951) was an American lecturer, writer, and academic.

Edward Howard Griggs was born on January 9, 1868, in Owatonna, Minnesota. He attended public schools in Madison, Indiana, and graduated from Indiana University in 1889. Between 1891 and 1899, he was an assistant professor of ethics at Stanford University (then called Leland Stanford University).

Griggs was a regular feature on the lecture circuit. His obituary includes his self-report that he gave over 13,000 lectures in his career.

As of 1940, Griggs was a professor in the philosophy department at the Brooklyn Institute of Arts and Sciences (now the Brooklyn Museum).

Griggs died on June 6, 1951, in Fairfax, Virginia.

== Books ==
- The New Humanism: Studies in Personal and Social Development (New York: self-published, 1900)
- Moral Education (New York: B. W. Huebsch, 1904)
- The Soul of Democracy (New York: Macmillan, 1918)
- The Story of an Itinerant Teacher (Indianapolis: Bobbs-Merrill, 1934)
- Moral Leaders (New York: Abingdon Press, 1940)
