= St. Paul's Cathedral (Buffalo, New York) =

Episcopal cathedral in Buffalo, New York, US

Saint Paul's Cathedral
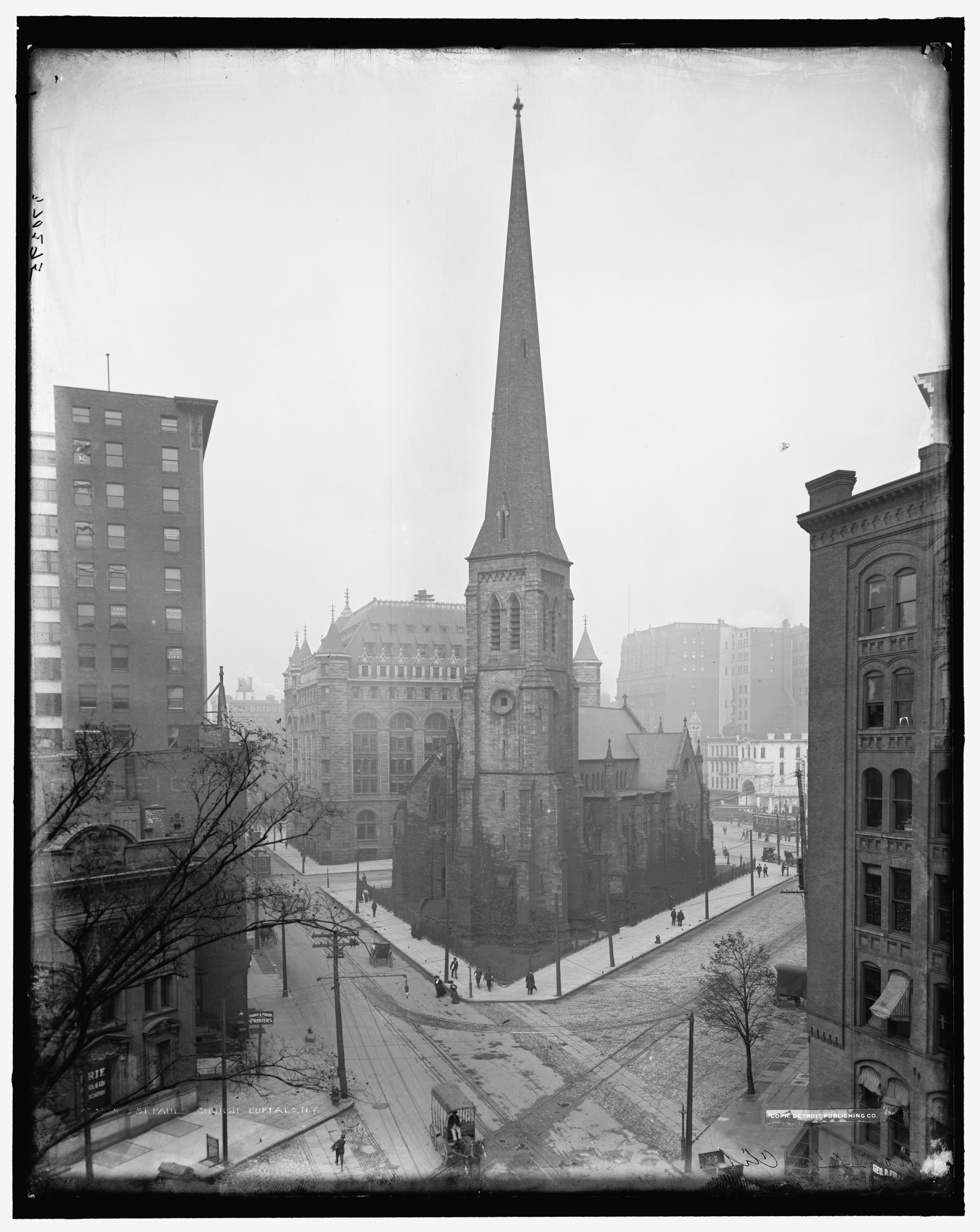
- Saint Paul's Cathedral
- Location: 139 Pearl Street, Buffalo, New York
- Country: United States
- Denomination: Episcopal
- Website: St. Paul's Episcopal Cathedral

History
- Status: Parish church
- Founded: February 10, 1817
- Founder: Samuel Johnston
- Dedicated: October 22, 1851
- Consecrated: October 22, 1851

Architecture
- Functional status: "Active"
- Completed: May 1873
- Construction cost: US$160 thousand

Specifications
- Height: 274 feet (83.5 m)
- Materials: Medina sandstone
- St. Paul's Episcopal Cathedral
- U.S. National Register of Historic Places
- U.S. National Historic Landmark
- New York State Register of Historic Places
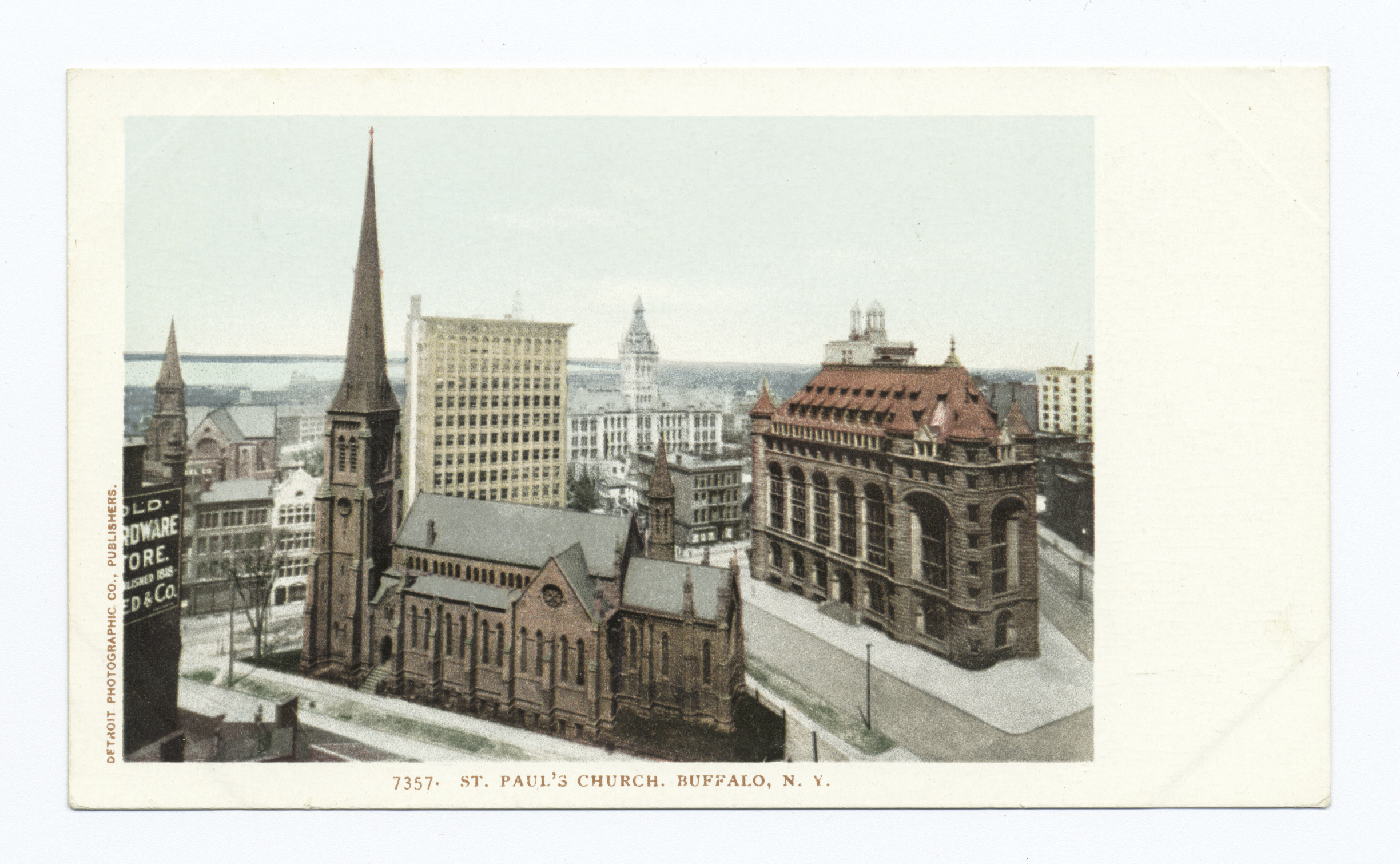
- St. Paul's Cathedral, ca. 1900

- Location within New York Location within the United States
- Location: Buffalo, New York
- Coordinates: 42°52′57.6″N 78°52′34.95″W
- Area: less than one acre
- Built: 1849–1851
- Architects: Richard Upjohn; Robert W. Gibson
- Architectural style: Gothic Revival
- NRHP reference No.: 73002298; 87002600 (National Historic Landmark designation)
- NYSRHP No.: 02940.002980

Significant dates
- Added to NRHP: March 1, 1973
- Designated NHL: December 23, 1987
- Designated NYSRHP: June 23, 1980

St. Paul's Cathedral is the cathedral of the Episcopal Diocese of Western New York and a landmark of downtown Buffalo, New York. The church sits on a triangular lot bounded by Church St., Pearl St., Erie St., and Main St. It was built in 1849–1851 to a design by Richard Upjohn. Its interior was gutted by fire in 1888, and was redesigned thereafter by Robert W. Gibson. It was designated a National Historic Landmark in 1987 for its architecture.

The cathedral reported 215 members in 2025. Plate and pledge income for the congregation in 2025 was $170,982 with average Sunday attendance (ASA) of 63. This was a relative decrease from ASA of 130 persons reported in 2015.

== History ==
In 1848, vestrymen of St. Paul's in Buffalo formed a building committee to erect a new stone church. Being familiar with architect Richard Upjohn's work through his recently completed Trinity Church in New York City, they desired no other architect for the job, and immediately engaged Upjohn for the commission.

Major structural events:

- 1849: construction started.
- 1851: the cathedral was dedicated/consecrated.
- 1870: the spires on top of the two towers were finished.
- 1888: a fire caused by a natural gas explosion nearly destroyed the building.
- 1890: the church reopened after undergoing a renovation overseen by Robert W. Gibson.

The building was listed on the National Register of Historic Places as St. Paul's Episcopal Cathedral in 1973. In 1987, the property was further declared a U.S. National Historic Landmark.

== Architecture ==
The cathedral has an irregular plan, whose largest component is the nave. It is built out of red Medina sandstone with an ashlar finish. The walls of the nave are supported by buttresses crowned with Gothic finials. The main tower and entrance portal are at the southwestern end; the tower rises 274 feet (84 m), with a tall steeple topped by a cross. A small tower rises 125 feet (38 m) from the north end. The interior features floors of slate and marble mosaic, with the floor around the altar made in France. The altar is of Mexican onyx, and the chancel furnishings is of oak, all designed by Robert Gibson.

== Notable people ==
- Gerrit Smith, organist at St. Paul's Cathedral in 1879-1880

== Gallery ==
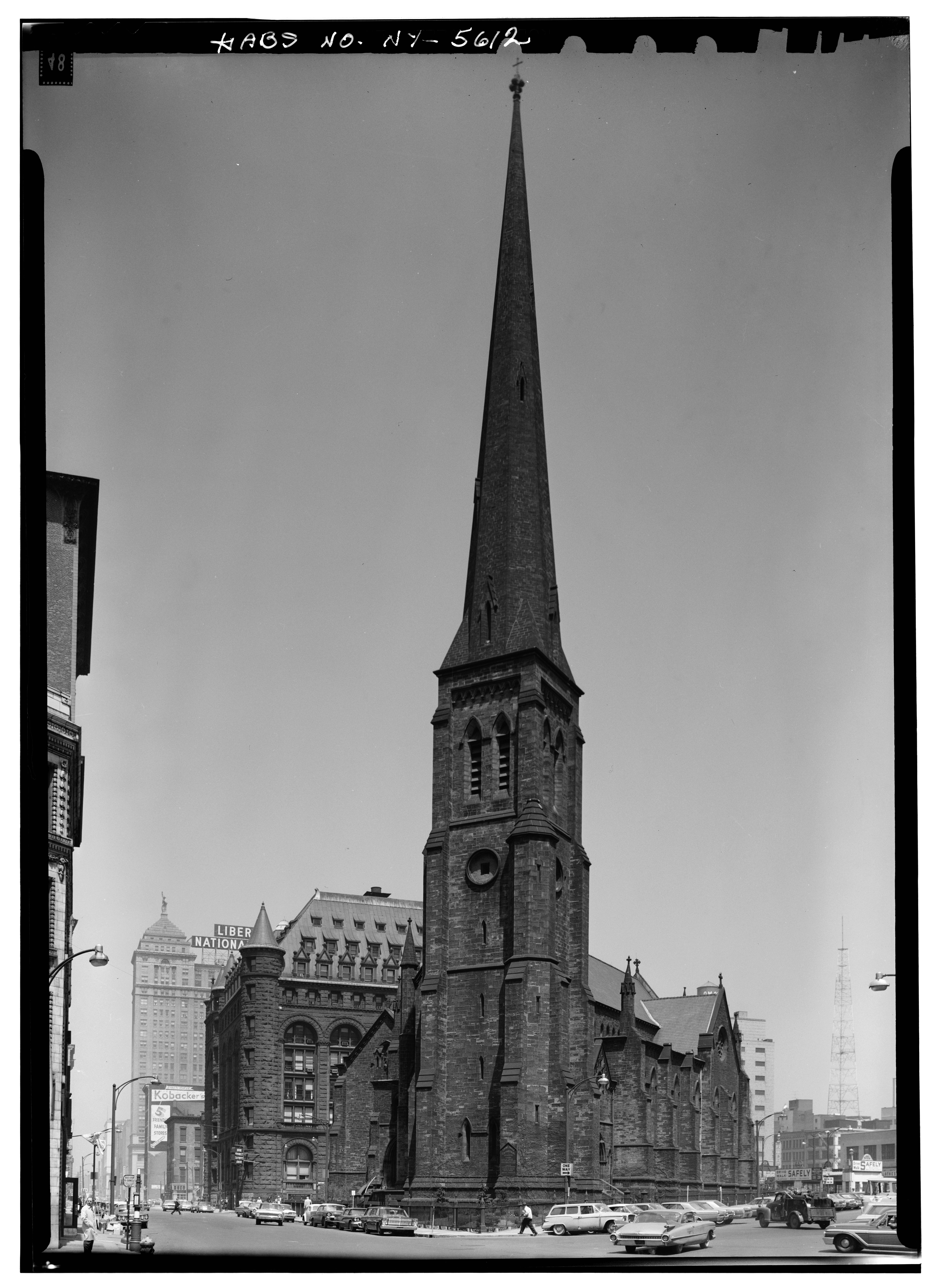
Exterior of church, 1965

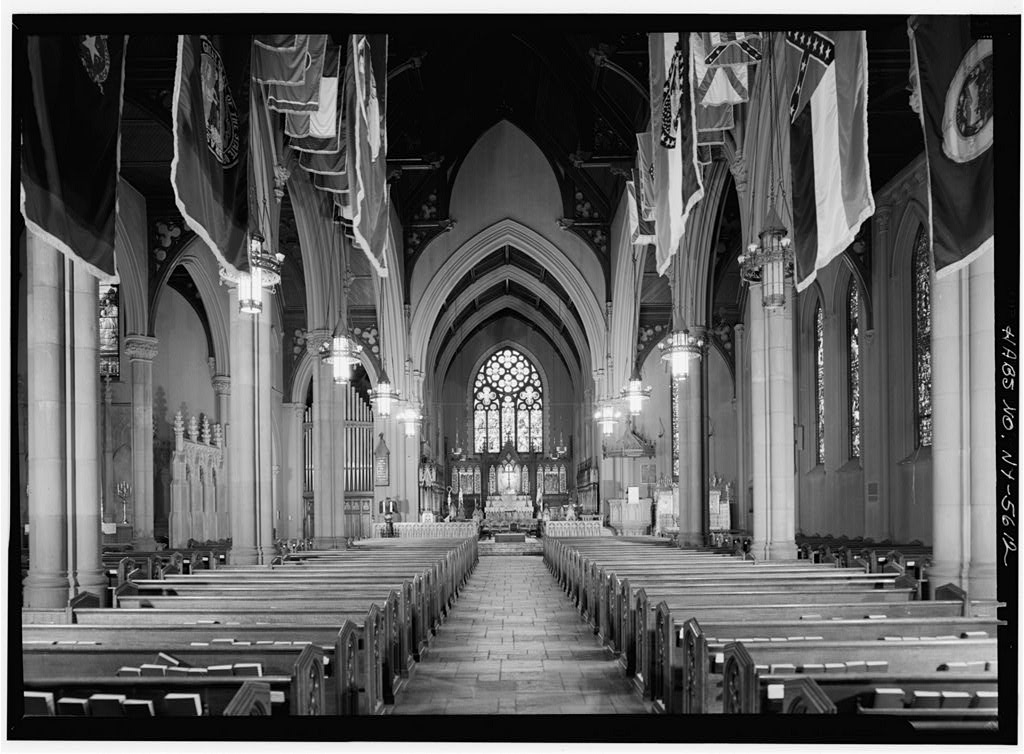
Interior of church, 1965

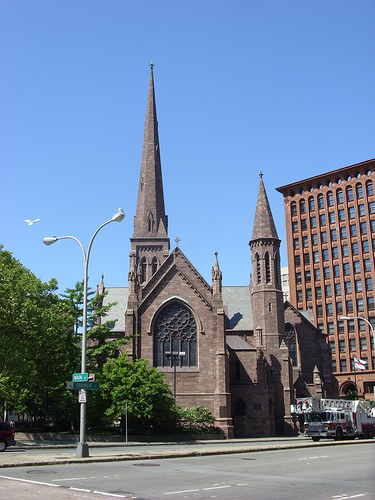
Exterior of church, 2009

== See also ==
- List of the Episcopal cathedrals of the United States
- List of cathedrals in the United States
- List of National Historic Landmarks in New York
- National Register of Historic Places in Buffalo, New York
- Guaranty Building (Buffalo, New York), located immediately to the west and also a National Historic Landmark
