= St. Andrew's Episcopal Church (Albany, New York) =

Historic church in New York, United States

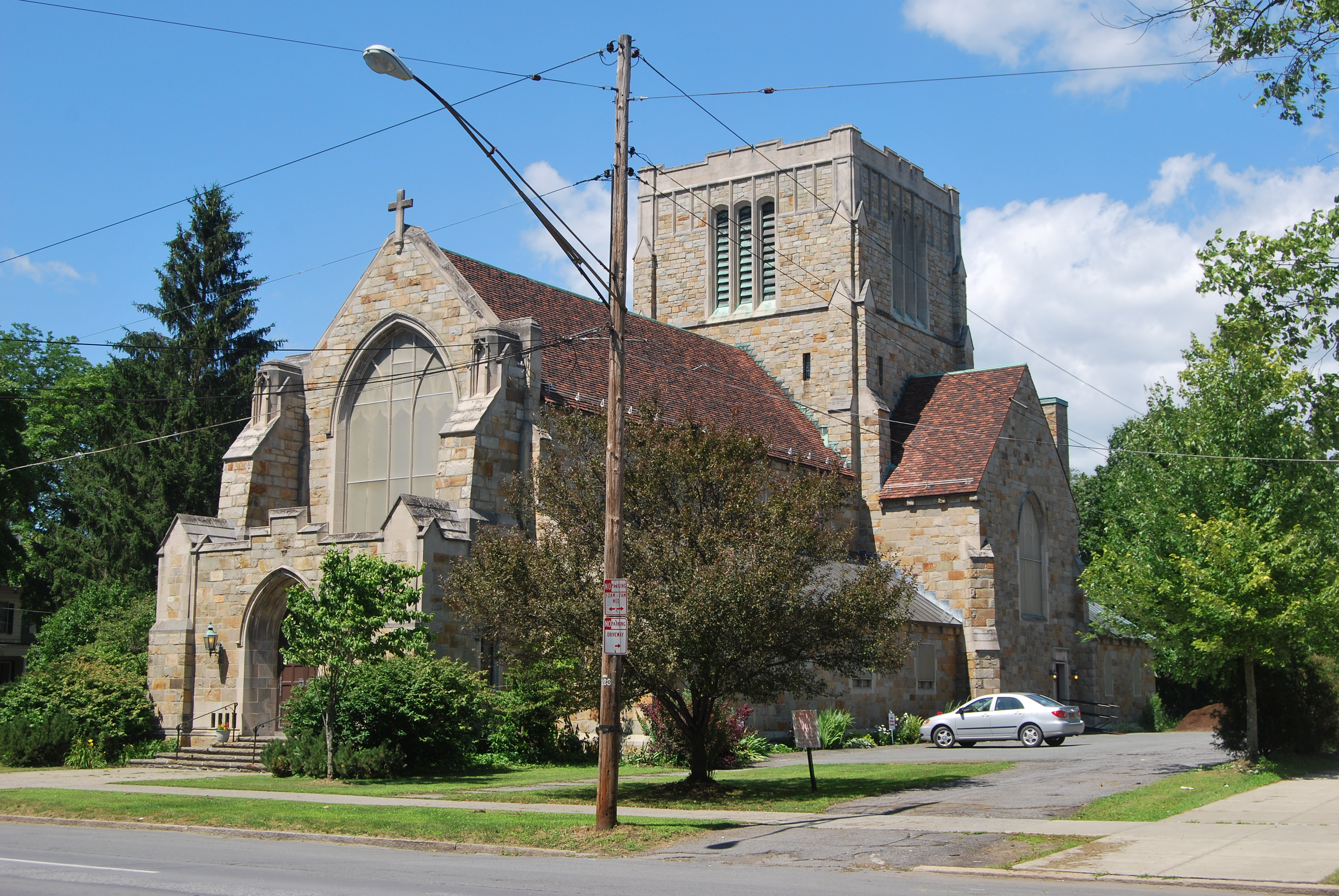
- South and east elevations, 2011

Religion
- Affiliation: Episcopal Church
- Leadership: The Rev. Mary Robinson White
- Year consecrated: 1947

Location
- Location: Albany, NY, USA
- Interactive map of St. Andrew's Episcopal Church
- Coordinates: 42°39′53″N 73°47′17″W

Architecture
- Architects: Norman R. Sturgis; Fred Eckel Jr.
- Style: Late Gothic Revival
- Groundbreaking: 1930
- Completed: 1931
- Construction cost: $250,000

Specifications
- Direction of façade: South
- Materials: stone, tile, copper

U.S. National Register of Historic Places
- Added to NRHP: January 7, 2005
- NRHP Reference no.: 04001447

Website
- St. Andrew's Episcopal Church, Albany, NY

St. Andrew's Episcopal Church is located at North Main and Madison (U.S. Route 20) avenues in Albany, New York, United States. It is a complex of three buildings, centered on the church itself, a stone structure designed by architect Norman Sturgis in the Late Gothic Revival architectural style and built in 1930. In 2005 it was listed on the National Register of Historic Places.

The church reported 369 members in 2017 and 207 members in 2023; no membership statistics were reported in 2024 parochial reports. Plate and pledge income reported for the congregation in 2024 was $181,841. Average Sunday attendance (ASA) in 2024 was 70 persons.

The congregation was established by a downtown church, St. Paul's, from a neighborhood mission near the end of the 19th century. It was one of the first churches started in the suburban areas of the city, as it expanded away from its historic core. St. Andrew's soon built its own church (since demolished to make room for the current attached parish house) and established itself as a separate parish.

Sturgis' structure was meant to embody the ideals of his mentor, Ralph Adams Cram, which valued the English Gothic styles as ideal for Episcopal and Anglican worship since such buildings were where it had originally been practiced. Accordingly, it is modeled in part on St. Albans Abbey in Hertfordshire, England, and a Roman brick from that location was placed in the hyphen between the church and the parish hall. But it is not an exact copy, and Sturgis himself described it as "an attempt to express fundamental truths in a new way to tell an old, old story in new words". It is considered one of the best examples of the 20th-century Late Gothic Revival style in Albany.

== Building ==
The church occupies the western half of the block of North Main between Madison on the south and Western Avenue on the north, two blocks east of where those streets split, in the Pine Hills neighborhood.

Paneled wooden doors open into an anteroom, from which another set, flanked by single wooden doors that correspond to the side aisles, lead to the sanctuary. The high and narrow nave has an arcade; the chancel is even narrower. Flooring is wood beneath the pews and stone elsewhere. All interior furnishings are of white oak. Windows are set with stained glass. The ceiling is framed in Douglas fir, solid except for the trusses, made of curved and straight members bolted together. Half-timbers form a crossing pattern on the ceiling. There are 32 stained glass windows.

== History ==
William Croswell Doane, elected the first bishop of the Episcopal Diocese of Albany upon its 1868 creation, saw the potential for growth of the church in places it had not previously been. Encouraged by that, in 1892 St. Paul's Church on Lancaster Street established the St. Andrew's Chapel in an old bank building on Madison Street, at the end of a trolley line in an area where the city was beginning to expand west from the core downtown areas where it had flourished since being settled by the Dutch in the 17th century. It was soon moved to the former School No. 4 building on Ontario Street.

Two years later, that space had been outgrown. A new chapel was built for $10,000 ($387,000 in modern dollars) in 1897 on Western Avenue near North Main, the same space occupied by the rectory today. Two years later, in 1899, the chapel petitioned the diocese to separate itself from its parent church, since its congregation was increasingly composed of residents of the area who had no historical connection to the founding church. It was granted later that year and St. Andrew's became its own parish, after agreeing to assume some of the financial obligations that had previously been St. Paul's.

Growth continued. The chancel of the new church was enlarged in 1901. It was still not large enough to handle the expanding congregation. In the late 1910s, the parish began planning for a new building. It bought the land south of the church in 1920 and began a fundraising campaign. Eventually it was able to accumulate enough money and on St. Andrew's Day, November 30, 1930, the cornerstone was laid. It was completed in time for dedication ceremonies the following Easter, at a cost of $250,000 ($5.29 million in modern dollars).

Architect Norman Sturgis designed the church to reflect the values of his mentor, Ralph Adams Cram, for whom he had worked as a draftsman after graduating from Harvard University's School of Architecture in 1913. Cram's own Episcopal churches had hewed closely to the Gothic designs of historic churches in England, which he deemed the only proper mode for Episcopal buildings. But at the same time he believed that style should be interpreted in modern ways, and the buildings not be mere copies of English originals. This style, as interpreted by Cram and others, became known as Collegiate Gothic since many of its exponent buildings were located on college campuses.

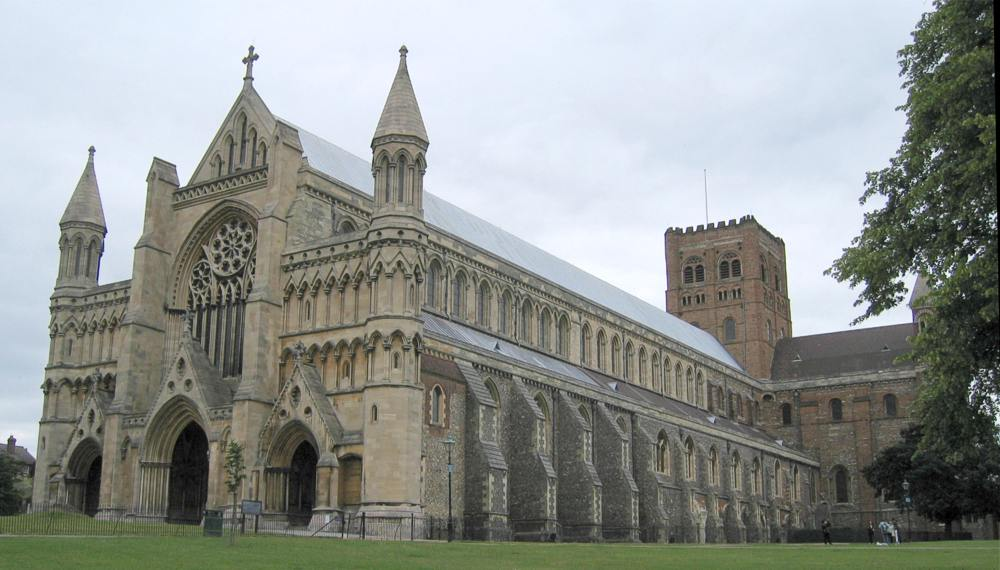
St Albans Abbey, Sturgis's model for St. Andrew's

Upon its completion, Sturgis described St. Andrew's as "an attempt to express fundamental truths in a new way to tell an old, old story in new words." Its English model was the St. Albans Abbey in Hertfordshire. Many of the craftsmen hired to build the church were local to Albany as the church was trying to help ease the effects of the Great Depression, which had just begun.

Despite difficulties raised by World War II, the mortgage was finally paid off and burned in 1947. Bishop Ashton Oldham consecrated the church not long afterwards. With its status now secure, in the 1950s the church began improving its physical plant. In 1956 the original 1897 church, which had been serving as the parish house, was demolished to allow the construction of the attached building that presently serves the same purpose. Its architects used light brown brick to better blend with the church. A Roman brick from St. Albans Abbey in England, Sturgis' partial model for the church, would later be installed in the hyphen connecting the two. Some time afterwards, the 1900 house that served as the church's rectory was purchased.

Echoing its own beginnings and reflecting the further suburban development of the Albany area in the mid-20th century, St. Andrew's established the mission parish of St. Boniface in Guilderland, just outside the city, in 1961. Nine years later, in 1970, the church bought and installed a new organ. In 1979 a thrift shop, The Shop at St. Andrew's, was opened. The most recent change to the church has been the installation of the columbarium in 1992, for which some of the original pews were removed.

St. Andrew's has been historically known as one of the more progressive congregation in the diocese, especially on LGBTQ issues. During the tenure of William H. Love, one of the most conservative bishops in the Episcopal church, St. Andrew's was one of three parishes in the diocese of Albany that applied to receive pastoral oversight from comparatively more liberal bishops in neighboring dioceses because of tensions with Love.

== See also ==
- National Register of Historic Places listings in Albany, New York
