= Wilbur Hogg =

American bishop

The Right Reverend Wilbur Emory Hogg D.D.
- Bishop of Albany
- Church: Episcopal Church
- Diocese: Albany
- In office: 1974–1984
- Predecessor: Allen W. Brown
- Successor: David Ball

Orders
- Ordination: December 1941 by Wallace John Gardner
- Consecration: March 9, 1974 by John E. Hines

Personal details
- Born: August 28, 1916 Baltimore, Maryland, United States
- Died: May 10, 1986 (aged 69) Portland, Maine, United States
- Denomination: Anglican
- Parents: Wilbur Emory Hogg & Ida May Spath
- Spouse: Lota Winchell Curtiss (m. Sept. 6, 1947)

Wilbur Emory Hogg Jr (August 28, 1916 – May 10, 1986) was the sixth Bishop of the Episcopal Diocese of Albany in the United States from 1974 until 1984.

== Early life ==
Hogg was born in Baltimore, Maryland, and attended Brown University and Philadelphia Divinity School. He was ordained a priest in 1941, and served as a curate, and later rector, at St. Mary's in Burlington, New Jersey until 1951. He served from 1951 to 1954 as a chaplain in the United States Army. Hogg was a priest at St. Mary the Virgin in Falmouth, Maine for 14 years, from 1954 to 1968.

Hogg was Dean of the Saint Luke's Cathedral in Portland, Maine from 1968 to 1974.

== Bishop of Albany ==
Hogg was elected Bishop of Albany in 1974, for which he expressed surprise. He was consecrated and installed that year in the cathedra in the choir at the Cathedral of All Saints, as the 6th Bishop of Albany. Erastus Corning 2nd, the mayor of Albany at the time, attended his consecration liturgy.

Hogg was known to be a conservative, evangelistic, anti-feminist and anti-gay rights. He banned the LGBT group Integrity from the Cathedral in 1983. However, he ordained some of the first female "perpetual" or permanent deacons in the diocese.

Hogg was an organizer of a conference on "Evangelical Catholicism" in 1977. In preparation for the Lake Placid Olympics, Hogg "requested funding of the ecumenical religious ministry at the 1980 Olympic Winter Cames at Lake Placid, N.Y." He was also active in ecumenism with the Roman Catholic Church, encouraging the merger of schools of the two different denominations into Doane Stuart School in 1975.

On October 10, 1983, David Ball, then Dean of the Cathedral of All Saints, was elected Bishop coadjutor of Albany. Ball was consecrated in early 1984 under apostolic succession by Presiding Bishop John Maury Allin, bishop David E. Richards, formerly suffragan of Albany and then bishop of the Anglican diocese of Central America, and Hogg. Hogg retired within the year. He died two years later, in 1986.

== Lota Hogg ==
Hogg was married to the former Lota W. Curtis, who was born in 1912, and who died in Albany in 1979. Lota Hogg was an accomplished music teacher at Middlebury College, having received both bachelor's and master's degrees in musicology from Yale University.

== See also ==
- Ima Hogg
- List of Episcopal bishops (U.S.)

Episcopal Church (USA) titles
| Preceded by Allen W. Brown | Bishop of Albany; 1974–1984 | Succeeded by David Ball |
