= Frederick L. Barry =

American bishop

The Right Reverend Frederick Lehrle Barry D.D.
- Bishop of Albany
- Church: Episcopal Church
- Diocese: Albany
- In office: 1949–1960
- Predecessor: G. Ashton Oldham
- Successor: Allen W. Brown
- Previous post: Coadjutor Bishop of Albany (1945-1949)

Orders
- Ordination: December 1925 by Ernest M. Stires
- Consecration: June 29, 1945 by Henry St. George Tucker

Personal details
- Born: March 23, 1897 Brooklyn, New York City, New York, United States
- Died: October 5, 1960 (aged 63) Albany, New York, United States
- Buried: Cathedral of All Saints (Albany, New York)
- Denomination: Anglican
- Parents: Albert & Anna Barry

Frederick Lehrle Barry (March 23, 1897 – October 5, 1960) was the fourth Bishop of the Episcopal Diocese of Albany in the United States from 1950 to 1960, during which he re-built a diocese.

== Early life ==
Barry was ordained a priest in 1925. He was a curate at St. Paul's, Flatbush. He served as rector at St. Gabriel's, Hollis, St. John's, Bridgeport, Connecticut, and St. Luke's, Evanston, Illinois. He was a bachelor his entire life.

== Work as Bishop ==
"On May 2, 1945, ... Barry was elected Bishop Coadjutor of Albany." He was consecrated, in a "magnificent demonstration," at the Cathedral of All Saints by Presiding Bishop Most Reverend Henry St. George Tucker, incumbent Albany Bishop George Ashton Oldham, and "Bishop Stires, retired Bishop of Long Island, who had ordained Frederick Barry to the priesthood." Upon Bishop Oldham's retirement, Bishop Barry was "enthroned" in the cathedra in the Cathedral of All Saints on January 25, 1950.

Bishop Barry travelled widely though the 19-county diocese to confirm parishioners, to ordain priests, and to preach. He specifically "was assigned jurisdiction over the missionary work of the Diocese." He founded "the Adirondack Mission... [f]or more than forty years, a team of clergy" to service the spiritual needs of several small parishes in the Adirondack Mountains area. He was an active leader in the Episcopal church.

In May 1950, at the end of a stormy Diocesan convention held at the Lake Placid Club, he nominated David E. Richards, then a priest at St. George's Church, Schenectady, who was elected his first suffragan bishop. Richards served until 1957, when he was elected to be the Missionary Bishop of Central America.

He asked for a replacement, and the Very Rev. Allen W. Brown, then Dean of the Cathedral of All Saints, was elected Suffragan Bishop of Albany in October 1958, over Charles Bowen Persell Jr., his only close competitor. Brown was consecrated on February 22, 1959, at St. John's Church, Ogdensburg, by Presiding Bishop the Most Reverend Arthur C. Lichtenberger. In 1960, Bishop Barry died in a hospital after some time in ill health, and the see was left vacant. Brown was elected and enthroned as diocesan bishop in 1961 to replace Barry. Barry is buried in the Lady Chapel of the Cathedral of All Saints.

== See also ==
- List of Episcopal bishops (U.S.)

Episcopal Church (USA) titles
Preceded by George Ashton Oldham	4th Bishop of Albany; 1950 – 1960	Succeeded by Allen W. Brown
