= Episcopal Diocese of Albany =

Episcopal Church diocese in the US

Coordinates: 42°40′N 73°45′W

Diocese of Albany Diœcesis Albanensis

Location
- Country: United States
- Ecclesiastical province: Province II

Statistics
- Congregations: 102 (2024)
- Members: 7,964 (2025)

Information
- Denomination: Episcopal Church
- Established: December 2, 1868
- Cathedral: Cathedral of All Saints
- Language: English, Spanish

Current leadership
- Bishop: Jeremiah Williamson

Map
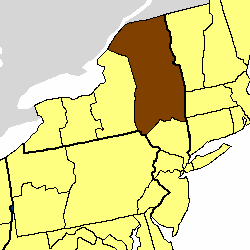
- Location of the Diocese of Albany

Website
- www.albanyepiscopaldiocese.org

The Episcopal Diocese of Albany is a diocese of the Episcopal Church covering 19 counties in northeastern New York state. It was formed in 1868 from a division of the Episcopal Diocese of New York.

The diocese reported 14,545 members in 2015 and 7,964 members in 2025. Plate and pledge income for the 102 filing congregations of the diocese in 2025 was $7,914,492. Average Sunday attendance (ASA) in 2025 was 3,258 persons. This represented a decline from 5,560 ASA in 2015.

== History ==
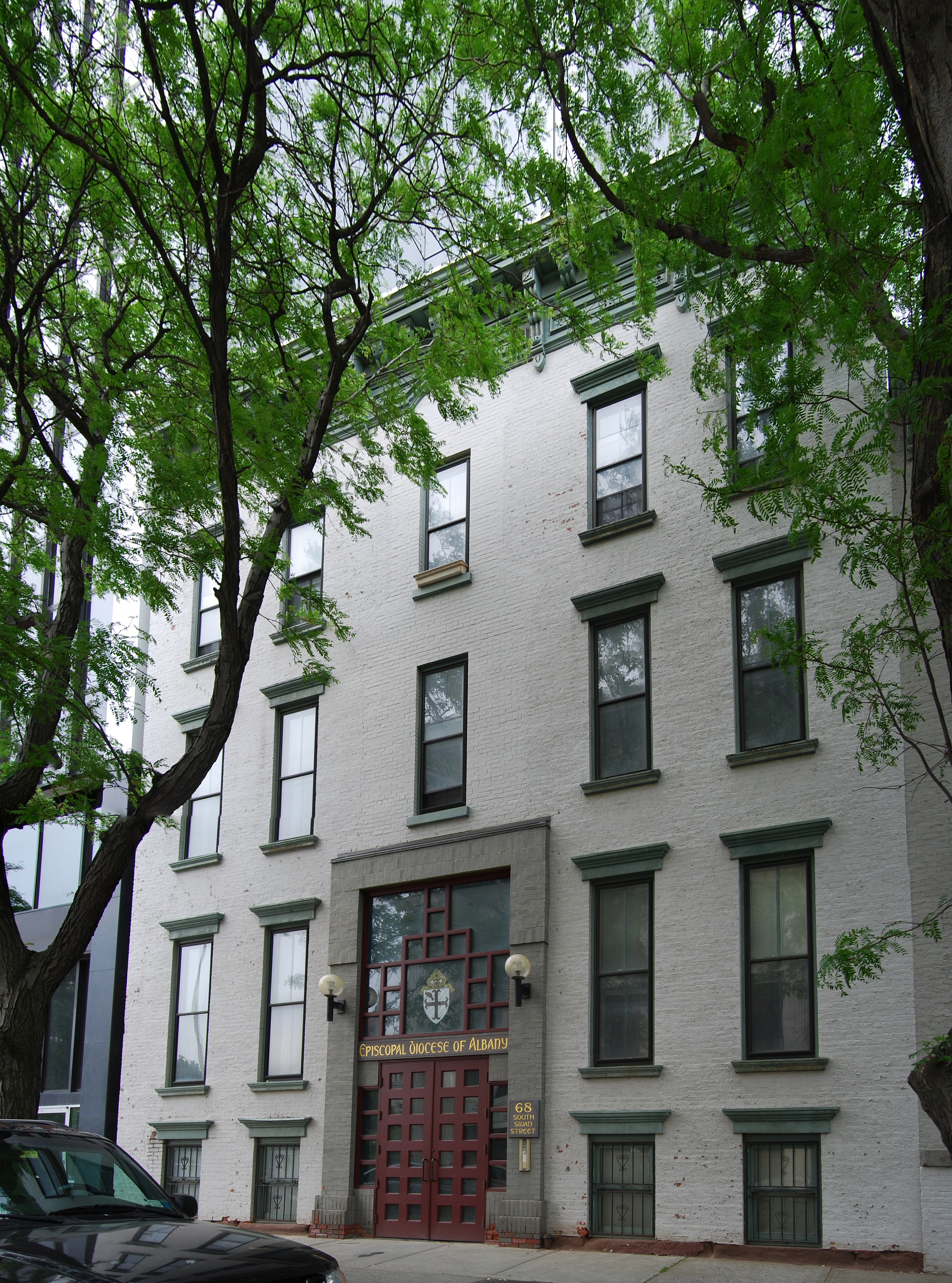
Headquarters of the diocese in Albany

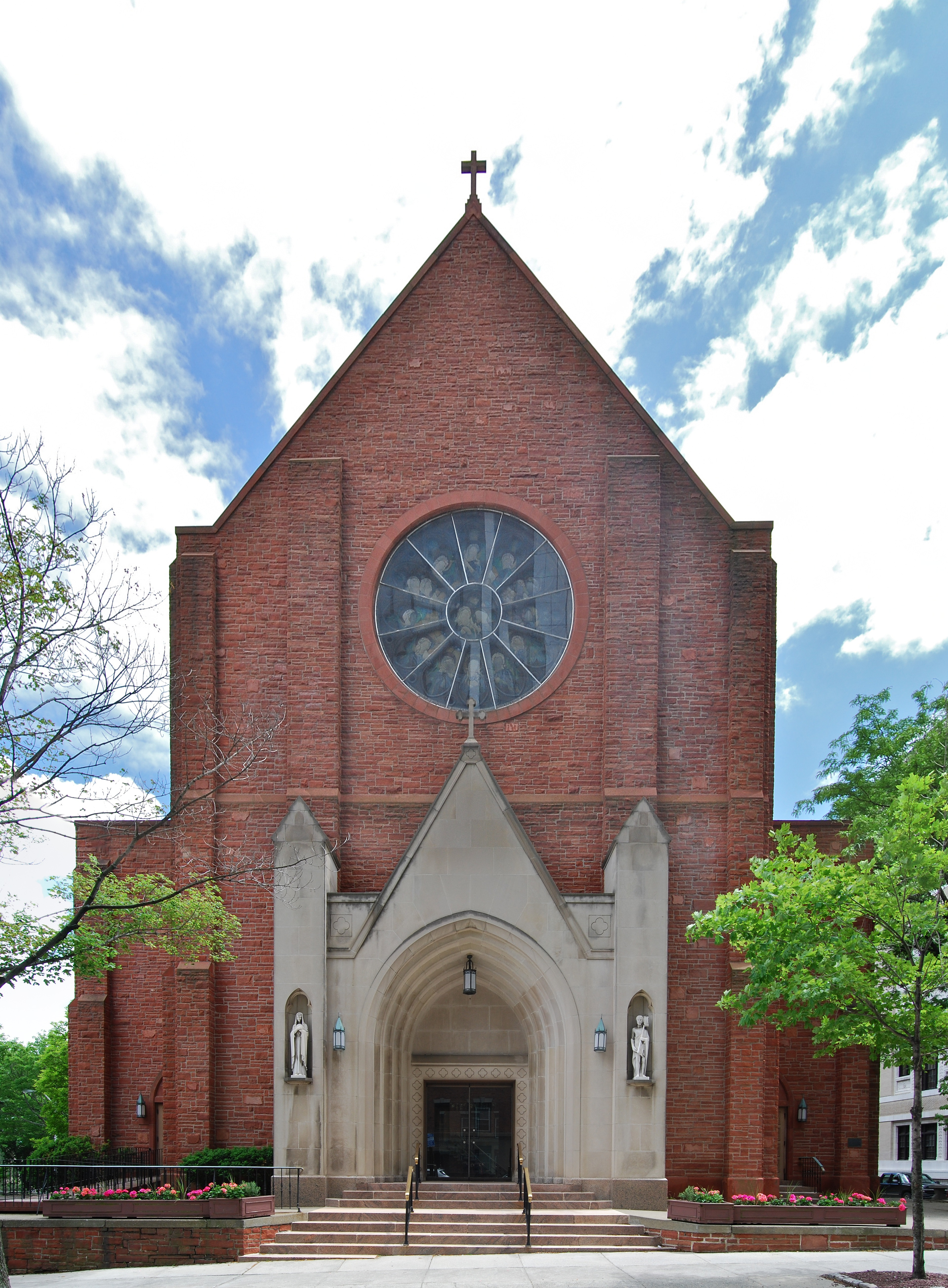
Cathedral of All Saints, Albany's Episcopal see

The Church of England arrived in 1674 with a chaplain assigned to the British military garrison at Albany. In 1704 the Society for the Propagation of the Gospel sent two missionaries to the Mohawk Valley, where the first Anglican church was erected in 1711.

In 1708 the oldest parish, St. Peter's, was founded in Albany. He extended his ministry to nearby Schenectady, and by 1763, St. George's Church was built in that town. In 1765 the last of the colonial parishes, St. John's in Johnstown, was established. By the beginning of the American Revolutionary War, Anglican missions were springing up in surrounding counties. However, the war proved disastrous to the English church, which for almost ten years after remained leaderless and disorganized.

With the formation of the Episcopal Diocese of New York in 1785 (comprising the entire state), the Church in New York began to reorganize. By 1790, during the "Second Great Awakening", expanded missionary activity begun under strong episcopal leadership was largely sustained by a vigorous laity. By 1810, 14 priests served 25 parishes in buildings made possible by grants from Trinity Parish, New York City.

In 1868, nineteen counties in the northeastern quarter of the state were organized into the Diocese of Albany. Its first bishop, William Croswell Doane, was elected in 1869 by a convention of 62 priests and 127 delegates. Doane's principles and personality had a profound and enduring effect upon the character of the Diocese of Albany. He organized the newly formed diocese after the English model with a cathedral see, and his "high church" leanings found expression in his establishment of St. Agnes School, The Child's Hospital, a community of women religious, and St. Margaret's House and Hospital for Babies.

Daniel W. Herzog was the eighth bishop of Albany. During Herzog's tenure, the Diocese purchased 612 acres of land in Greenwich, New York and created the Christ the King Center. In 2007, several months after his retirement, Herzog renounced his ordained ministry and was received into communion with the Roman Catholic Church. Since 2003, Herzog had been an increasingly vocal critic of some decisions of the Episcopal Church's General Convention, including its 2003 affirmation of the election of a non-celibate gay bishop, Gene Robinson, in the Diocese of New Hampshire. Following a period of further reflection, Herzog rescinded his renunciation and was restored to the ministry of the Episcopal Church with effect from April 28, 2010. Herzog later left the Episcopal Church again and joined the Anglican Church in North America.

Presiding Bishop and Primate of the Episcopal Church of the United States Katharine Jefferts Schori visited the Episcopal Diocese of Albany in 2011.

William H. Love was elected bishop coadjutor in 2006 and was installed as bishop of Albany in February 2007 following Herzog's retirement. Love was an orthodox and theologically conservative bishop. In 2011, Love spoke out in opposition to the passage of same-sex marriage legislation in New York. In October 2020, Love was found to have violated Episcopal Church doctrine and rules due to his unwillingness to permit same-sex unions to be blessed by clergy within the Albany diocese. In response to that finding, Love resigned from his position as bishop effective February 1, 2021; he later left the Episcopal Church altogether. Four priests and four deacons left the Albany Diocese in protest following Love's departure. Michael G. Smith, former bishop of North Dakota, was appointed as assisting bishop while the diocese searched for a new leader.

Jeremiah Williamson is the tenth bishop of Albany. His consecration as bishop occurred on February 24, 2024.

== Companion dioceses ==
- The Diocese of Down and Dromore is part of the Church of Ireland and is located in North East Ireland. The diocese covers half of Belfast, the capital of Northern Ireland, east of the River Lagan, as well as County Armagh east of the River Bann. The cathedral and administrative offices are in Belfast.
- The Diocese of Maridi is located in South Sudan. The diocese is part of the Episcopal Church of Sudan.
- The Diocese of Northern Argentina is located in northern Argentina and is part of the Anglican Church of South America.

== List of bishops ==
Bishops of Albany
From	Until	Incumbent	Notes
1869	1913	William Croswell Doane	
1913	1929	Richard H. Nelson	Coadjutor bishop since 1904.
1929	1949	G. Ashton Oldham	Coadjutor bishop since 1922.
1949	1960	Frederick L. Barry	Coadjutor bishop since 1945.
1961	1974	Allen W. Brown	Suffragan bishop since 1959.
1974	1984	Wilbur E. Hogg	
1984	1998	David S. Ball	Coadjutor bishop since 1984.
1998	2007	Daniel W. Herzog	Coadjutor bishop since 1997.
2007	2021	William H. Love	Coadjutor bishop since 2006.
2024		Jeremiah Williamson	Bishop since 2024

== List of suffragan bishops ==
Suffragan bishops in Albany Diocese
From	Until	Incumbent	Notes
1904	1913	Richard H. Nelson, coadjutor bishop	Diocesan bishop, 1913–1929.
1922	1929	G. Ashton Oldham, coadjutor bishop	Diocesan bishop, 1929–1949.
1945	1949	Frederick L. Barry, coadjutor bishop	Diocesan bishop, 1949–1960.
1951	1957	David E. Richards	David Emrys Richards (born January 23, 1921, Scranton, PA); translated to Central America.
1959	1961	Allen W. Brown	Diocesan bishop, 1961–1974.
1963	1974	Charles B. Persell Jr.	Charles Bowen Persell Junior (March 9, 1909, Lakewood, NY – September 23, 1988, Albany, NY)
1984		David S. Ball, coadjutor bishop	Diocesan bishop, 1984–1998.
1997	1998	Daniel W. Herzog, coadjutor bishop	Diocesan bishop, 1998–2007.
2000	2007	David Bena	David John "Dave" Bena (born December 10, 1943); joined CANA.
2006	2007	William H. Love, coadjutor bishop	Diocesan bishop 2007-2021.

== Historic churches in the diocese ==
Historic churches in the diocese include:

- All Saints Episcopal Church (Round Lake, New York), 1892
- Christ Episcopal Church (Duanesburg, New York), 1793
- Church of the Good Shepherd (Cullen, New York), 1892
- Church of the Good Shepherd (Raquette Lake, New York), 1880
- Church of St. John the Evangelist (Hunter, New York) 1885
- Church of the Transfiguration (Blue Mountain Lake, New York), 1885
- Emmanuel Episcopal Church (Little Falls, New York), 1835
- St. Andrew's Episcopal Church (Albany, New York), 1931
- St. George’s Episcopal Church (Schenectady, New York),1735
- St. John's Church Complex (Delhi, New York), 1831
- St. John's Episcopal Church (Johnstown, New York), 1837
- St. Mark's Episcopal Church (Hoosick Falls, New York), 1860
- St. Mary's Episcopal Church (Springfield Center, New York), 1889
- St. Paul's Episcopal Church (Troy, New York), 1828
- St. Peter's Episcopal Church (Albany, New York), 1876
- St. Stephen's Episcopal Church (Schuylerville, New York), 1838
- Trinity Episcopal Church (Ashland, New York), 1879
- Trinity Episcopal Church-Fairfield, 1808
- Trinity Episcopal Church (Potsdam, New York), 1835
- Zion Episcopal Church Complex, 1800

== See also ==
- Cathedral of All Saints, Albany, New York
- List of bishops of the Episcopal Church in the United States of America
