= Allen W. Brown =

American bishop

The Right Reverend Allen Webster Brown D.D., L.H.D.
- Bishop of Albany
- Church: Episcopal Church
- Diocese: Albany
- In office: 1961–1974
- Predecessor: Frederick L. Barry
- Successor: Wilbur Hogg
- Previous post: Suffragan Bishop of Albany (1959-1961)

Orders
- Ordination: September 21, 1934 by G. Ashton Oldham
- Consecration: February 21, 1959 by Arthur C. Lichtenberger

Personal details
- Born: July 22, 1908 La Fargeville, New York, United States
- Died: January 19, 1990 (aged 81) Massillon, Ohio, United States
- Denomination: Anglican
- Parents: Nicholas H. Brown & Edith Haller
- Spouse: Helen Ruth Belshaw (m. July 5, 1930)
- Children: 4

Allen Webster Brown (July 22, 1908 - January 19, 1990) was the fifth Bishop of Albany in the United States from 1961 to 1974, during turbulent times from the 1960s to the drafting of the new Book of Common Prayer.

== Early life ==
Brown graduated from the Philadelphia Divinity School with his degree in divinity. He was ordained a priest in 1934. He worked at several parishes in the diocese of Albany in the 1940s, including in Hudson and Copake Falls, before he became Dean of the Cathedral of All Saints He was married to the former Helen Belshaw.

== Work as Bishop ==
Brown was elected Suffragan Bishop of Albany in October 1958, to assist the incumbent, Frederick L. Barry, Bishop of Albany. He was consecrated on February 22, 1959, at St. John's Church, Ogdensburg, by Arthur C. Lichtenberger, Presiding Bishop. In 1960, Barry died in a hospital after some time in ill health, and the see was left vacant. Brown was elected and enthroned as diocesan bishop in 1961. In 1963, he requested the election of a new Suffragan bishop; Charles Bowen Persell Jr., his only close competitor in the 1958 race, was thereafter elected.

Brown travelled widely though the 19-county diocese to confirm parishioners, to ordain priests, and to preach.

He retired as Bishop of Albany in 1974, and died in 1990 at the age of 81.

== See also ==
- List of Episcopal bishops (U.S.)

Episcopal Church (USA) titles
Preceded by Frederick L. Barry	5th Bishop of Albany; 1961 – 1974	Succeeded by Wilbur Hogg
