= Ezekiel Kondo =

Sudanese Anglican bishop (born 1957)

The Most Reverend Ezekiel Kondo
- Archbishop of Sudan and Bishop of Khartoum
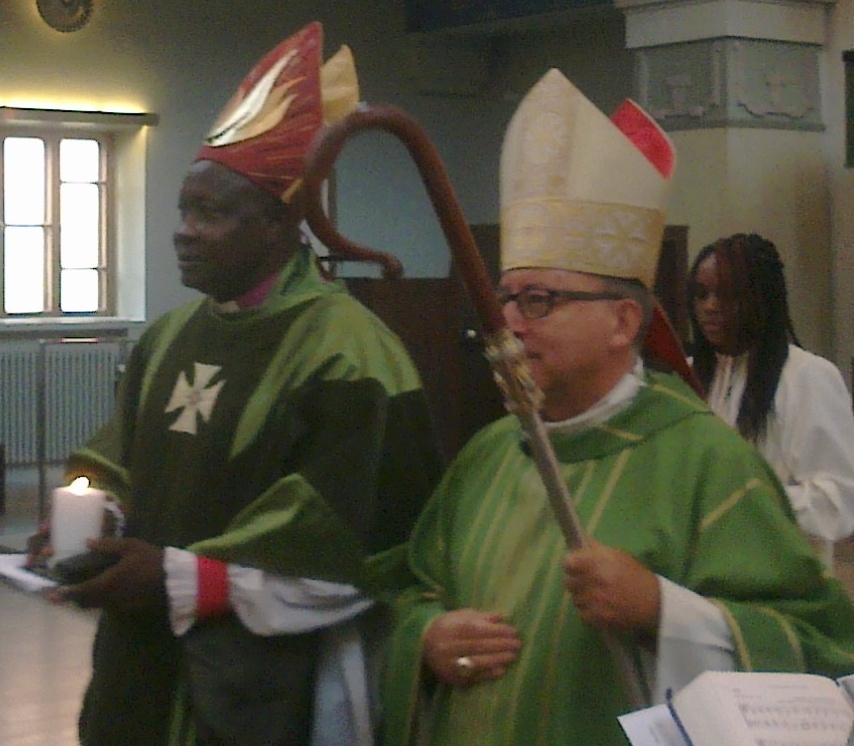
- Kondo (left) with David Hamid, suffragan bishop in Europe, in Mikael Agricola Church, Helsinki
- Church: Province of the Episcopal Church of Sudan
- In office: 2014-

Orders
- Ordination: 1988
- Consecration: 2003 by Joseph Marona

Personal details
- Born: 1957 (age 68–69)
- Denomination: Anglicanism

Ezekiel Kondo Kumir Kuku (born 1957) is a Sudanese Anglican bishop. He was the first Archbishop of the Internal Province of Sudan in the Province of the Episcopal Church of South Sudan and Sudan, since his enthronement, on 28 July 2014, until taking office as the first Archbishop and Primate of the newly created Province of the Episcopal Church of Sudan on 30 July 2017.

== Early life and ecclesiastical career ==
Kondo was born in the Nuba Mountains area, in South Kordofan, Sudan. He was ordained a priest in 1988. He studied at Trinity College, Bristol, England, where he earned a Theology degree in 1992. Returning to Sudan, he served as Provost of the Khartoum's Cathedral, since 1993, he became provincial secretary in 2000, and was elected Bishop of the Diocese of Khartoum in 2003. He also served in the Anglican Consultative Council since 1998.

It was decided that the Episcopal Church of Sudan would remain united upon the independence of South Sudan, in 2011, at the General Convention held in 2013, with the new name of Province of the Episcopal Church of South Sudan and Sudan. The five dioceses in north Sudan, Khartoum, El Obeid, Port Sudan, Kadugli and Wad Medani would form the Internal Province of Sudan. The new internal province was inaugurated on 19 July 2013, with an interim administration. On 4 April 2014, Kondo was elected the first Archbishop of the Internal Province of Sudan, with his enthronement taking place at All Saints Cathedral, in Khartoum, on 28 July 2014, by Archbishop Daniel Deng Bul, with a large crowd in attendance. Archbishop of Canterbury Justin Welby didn't attended but he sent a message through his representative, Michael Paget-Wilkes, chairman of the Sudan Church Association and retired Archdeacon of Warwick.

In March 2017, it was announced that the ACC had decided that the Internal Province of Sudan would become the 39th province of the Anglican Communion within few months, with Kondo as their first archbishop and primate. Kondo's enthronement took place at All Saints Cathedral, in Khartoum, on 30 July 2017, attended by the Archbishop of Canterbury, Justin Welby.

== Views ==
Kondo is a supporter of GAFCON and the Anglican realignment. He was one of the eight Anglican archbishops that attended Foley Beach enthronement as Archbishop and Primate of the Anglican Church in North America, which took place on 9 October 2014, at the Church of the Apostles, in Atlanta, United States.

Anglican Communion titles
Preceded by new title	Primate of the Province of the Anglican Church of Sudan; 2017–	Succeeded by incumbent
