= Charles B. Persell Jr. =

American bishop (1909–1988)

The Right Reverend Charles Bowen Persell S.T.D.
- Suffragan Bishop of Albany
- Church: Episcopal Church
- Diocese: Albany
- Elected: October 9, 1962
- In office: 1963–1977
- Predecessor: Allen W. Brown
- Successor: David Ball

Orders
- Ordination: January 21, 1935 by David Lincoln Ferris
- Consecration: February 9, 1963 by Arthur C. Lichtenberger

Personal details
- Born: March 4, 1909 Lakewood, New York, United States
- Died: September 23, 1988 (aged 79) Albany, New York, United States
- Denomination: Anglican
- Parents: Charles Bowen Persell & Berenice Caskey
- Spouse: Emily Elizabeth Aldrich (m. 1936); Dorothy L. Patterson (m. 1969)
- Children: 5
- Education: Hobart College

Charles Bowen Persell Jr. (March 4, 1909 – September 23, 1988) was a suffragan bishop of the Episcopal Diocese of Albany, serving from 1963 to 1977. His son was William Persell, bishop of the Episcopal Diocese of Chicago from 1999 to 2008. He was an alumnus of the General Theological Seminary of the Episcopal Church.

== Early life and education ==
Persell was born on March 4, 1909, in Lakewood, New York, the son of Charles Bowen Persell and Berenice Caskey. He was educated at Mayville High School in Mayville, New York. He graduated with a Bachelor of Arts from Hobart College in 1931 and with a Bachelor of Sacred Theology from the General Theological Seminary in 1934. Hobart awarded him a Doctor of Sacred Theology in 1963.

== Ordained ministry ==
Persell was ordained deacon on June 2, 1934, by Bishop Cameron Josiah Davis of Western New York, after which he was transferred to serve in the Diocese of Rochester, where he became pastor at Grace Church in Scottsville, New York and St Andrew's Mission in Caledonia, New York. He was then ordained priest on January 21, 1935, by Bishop David Lincoln Ferris of Rochester. In 1937, he became rector of Zion Church in Avon, New York and St Peter's Church in Holcomb, New York, relinquishing the latter in 1941 and the former in 1942. He then became rector of the Church of the Epiphany in Rochester, New York, before becoming Archdeacon of Rochester in 1944. In 1950, he became rector of St John's Church in Massena, New York, where he remained until 1961. That year, he was appointed Canon to the Ordinary of the Diocese of Albany and a few months later was also elected Archdeacon of Albany.

== Bishop ==
On October 9, 1962, Persell was elected Suffragan Bishop of Albany and was consecrated on February 9, 1963, in the Cathedral of All Saints, by Presiding Bishop Arthur C. Lichtenberger. He retained the post till his retirement in 1977. He died on September 23, 1988, at St Peter's Hospital in Albany, New York after a stroke.
