= Benjamin Wani Yugusuk =

The Most Reverend Benjamin Wani Yugusuk
- Archbishop of Sudan
- Church: Episcopal Church of Sudan
- In office: 1988-1998
- Predecessor: Elinana J. Ngalamu
- Successor: Joseph Marona
- Previous post: Bishop of Rumbek

Orders
- Ordination: May 5, 1955
- Consecration: January 24, 1971 by Michael Ramsey

Personal details
- Born: 1928 Thobole, Juba
- Died: May 23, 2000 (aged 71–72) Kosti

Benjamin Wani Yugusuk (1923, in Tho'bole, Juba – 23 May 2000, in Kosti) was a Sudanese Anglican (Episcopalian) bishop. He was the second archbishop and primate of the Episcopal Church of Sudan, from 1988 to 1998.

== Early life ==
He was born to parents of the Olu'ba ethnic group, who practiced the worship of ancestors. He studied at Lomega Elementary School, from 1930 to 1933. He was baptized in the Anglican church on 25 December 1941. He moved afterwards to Juba Teacher Primary School. He entered Yei Teacher Training Institute in 1946, where he earned a certificate in teaching in 1947. He was a teacher at Juba Elementary School, from 1948 to 1950.

== Ecclesiastical career ==
He decided to study Theology at Gwynne College in Mundri, where he graduated in 1952. He was ordained as a deacon on 17 January 1953, and as a priest on 5 May 1955. He was the priest at the Lomega and Lainya parishes in 1956. He was also secretary to the Diocese of the Sudan, in Khartoum, in 1960. He moved to England, where he studied at the London College of Divinity, earning a diploma as M.D. in 1969.

He was consecrated bishop in Khartoum, on 24 January 1971, during the Episcopal Synod of the Middle East, by the Archbishop of Canterbury, Michael Ramsey. He was transferred as acting bishop to the Diocese of Yei in 1975. The Province of the Episcopal Church of Sudan was created on 11 September 1976; he then became bishop of the Episcopal Diocese of Rumbek, the largest in the province, where he would serve until 1988.

He became dean of the province in Juba, in 1986, and served as acting archbishop of the Episcopal Church of Sudan, from 1986 to 1988.

Yugusuk was enthroned as Archbishop and Primate on 28 February 1988. Bishop John Baker, of Salisbury, was the representative of the Archbishop of Canterbury, Robert Runcie, at the ceremony. During his tenure, his church experienced an unprecedent growth, which saw the creation of several new dioceses. He retired in February 1998.

He died suddenly in Kosti, on 23 May 2000, and was buried at All Saints Cathedral, in Juba.

== Family ==
Benjamin Yugusuk's son, Paul Pitya Benjamin Yugusuk, followed his father into ordination, and is currently the Archbishop of Central Equatoria, a metropolitan archbishopric within the Episcopal Church of South Sudan. He also serves as Dean of the Province of the Episcopal Church of South Sudan, a role that is second only to the Primate in rank and responsibility.

Anglican Communion titles
Preceded by Elinana J. Ngalamu	Primate of the Episcopal Church of Sudan; 1988-1998	Succeeded by Joseph Marona
