= All Saints Episcopal Church (Round Lake, New York) =

Historic church in New York, United States

Coordinates: 42°56′22″N 73°47′47″W

All Saints Episcopal Church Round Lake, New York
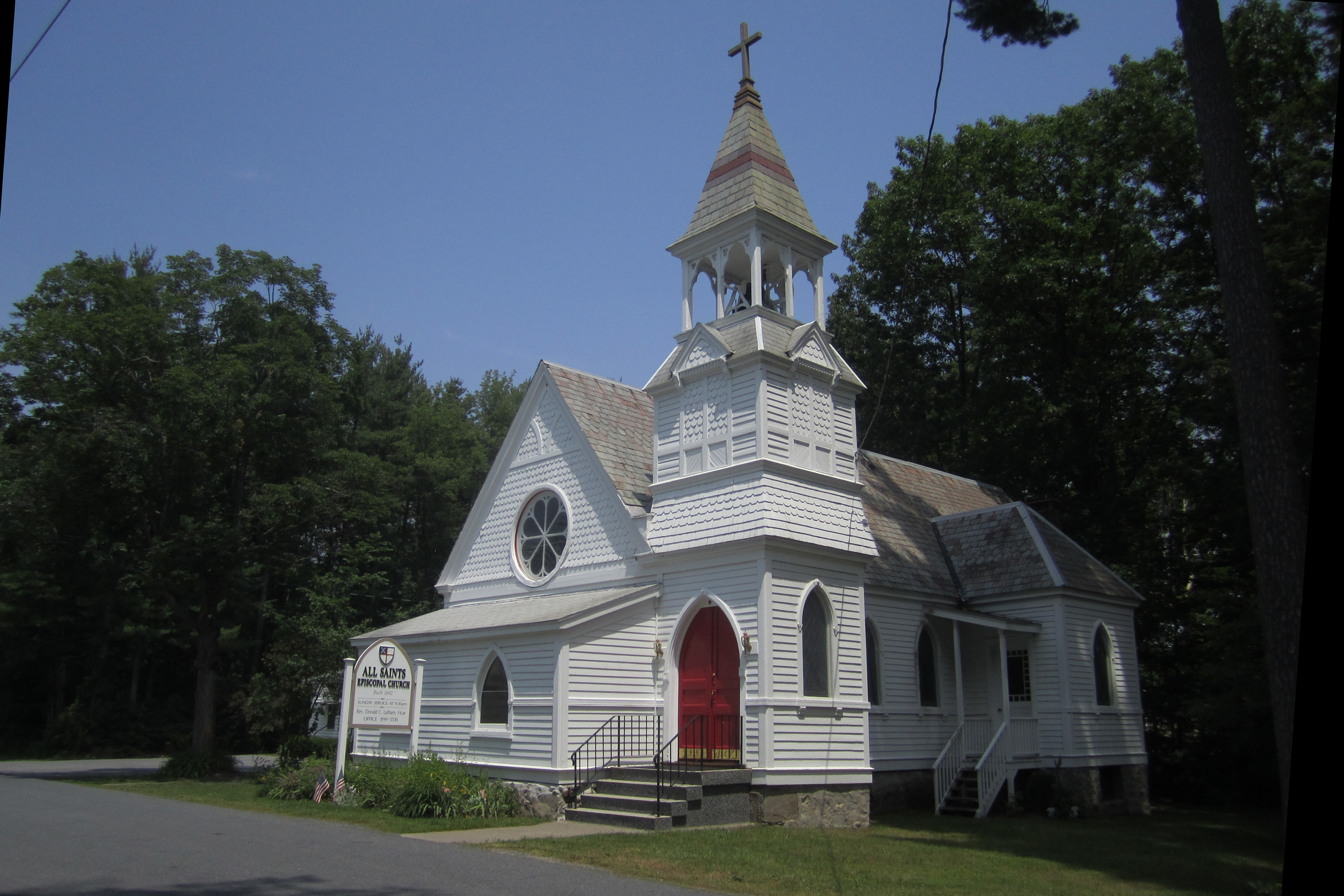
- All Saints Church in 2013
- All Saints Episcopal Church; Round Lake, New York
- Denomination: Episcopal
- Website: http://www.allsaintsroundlake.com

History
- Dedication: All Saints

Administration
- Province: Two
- Diocese: Episcopal Diocese of Albany
- Parish: All Saints

Clergy
- Priest: Rev. Dr. Scott Evans

All Saints' Episcopal Church, is an historic Carpenter Gothic church built in 1892 on Simpson Avenue in Round Lake, New York. It is a contributing property in the Round Lake Historic District.

== See also ==
- Round Lake, New York
