= Joseph Marona =

The Most Reverend Joseph Marona
- Archbishop of Sudan
- Church: Episcopal Church of Sudan
- In office: 2000–2007
- Predecessor: Benjamin Wani Yugusuk
- Previous post: Bishop of Maridi

Orders
- Ordination: 1981
- Consecration: April 22, 1984 by Elinana J. Ngalamu

Personal details
- Born: 1941 Maridi
- Died: September 18, 2009 (aged 67–68) Khartoum

Joseph Bringi Hassan Marona (Maridi, now South Sudan, 1941 – Khartoum, September 18, 2009) was a Sudanese Episcopalian bishop.

== Early life and professional career ==
Marona was born in Maridi, a western town of Southern Sudan. He first studied at Maridi Mission Primary School, a Church Missionary Society school, from 1952 to 1954, when he entered Yambio Upper Primary School. Afterwards he joined Yei Teachers Training College, graduating with a certificate in teaching in 1958. Meanwhile, Sudan had become independent from the Anglo-Egyptian protectorate, in 1956.

He worked as an Arabic teacher in the primary schools of Tali and Lui, from 1962 to 1966. He had to left the country due to the Civil War between the northern and the southern parts of the country, moving to Uganda, where he would remain until the end of the conflict. He continued to teach in Uganda, while also pursuing his studies. He received two diplomas in Education at Makerere University, in 1971, and one in Communication and History in 1973. He returned to Sudan after the signing of the Addis Ababa Peace Agreement between Sudan and the Southern Sudan Liberation Army in 1972. He resumed his teacher activity and was promoted to deputy headmaster of Yei Primary School, where he taught from 1975 to 1976. He moved to Tore Primary School, after being promoted to headmaster in 1977, where he remained for two years.

== Ecclesiastical career ==
He decided to study Theological Education training at Bishop Gwynne College, where he studied from 1978 to 1980. He was ordained a deacon in 1981 and a priest in 1982. He was head of the department of Christian education and training at Maridi Training Teachers Institute, from 1981 and 1983, while also doing some Bible translation work into his native language, Baka.

Marona was consecrated the first bishop of the newly created Episcopal Diocese of Maridi on April 22, 1984. He soon became secretary of the Episcopal Council of the House of Bishops of the Episcopal Church of Sudan, a position he held until 1999. The same year, he was elected dean and acting Archbishop of the Episcopal Church of Sudan. He would be elected the third Archbishop and Primate of the province in 2000. He served until his retirement due to ill health, on December 31, 2007, two years ahead before the end of his ten years term.

He was chairman of the New Sudan Council of Churches, an ecumenical body reuniting several Christian denominations in Southern Sudan, from 1997 to 1999. He worked hardly for peace and reconciliation in Southern Sudan.

He died at his son's home in Khartoum, north Sudan, on September 18, 2009, aged 68 years old, after a long illness. He was buried at All Saints' Cathedral, in Juba.

Anglican Communion titles
Preceded by Benjamin Wani Yugusuk	Primate of the Episcopal Church of Sudan; 2000-2007	Succeeded by Daniel Deng Bul
