= Richard H. Nelson =

American bishop

The Right Reverend Richard Henry Nelson D.D., S.T.D.
- Bishop of Albany
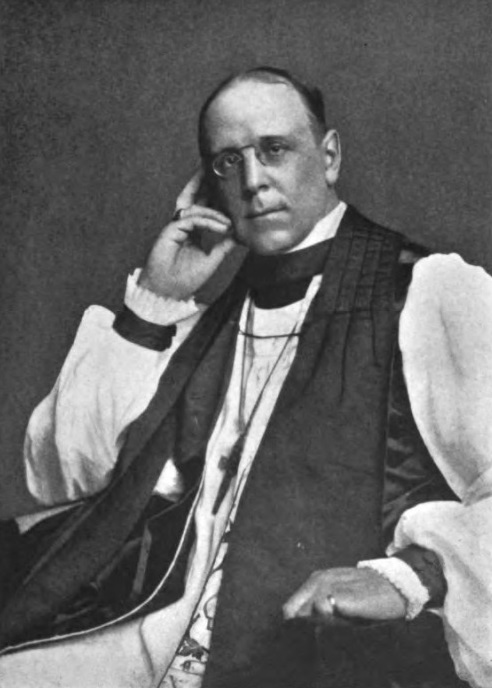
- Church: Episcopal Church
- Diocese: Albany
- In office: 1913–1929
- Predecessor: William Croswell Doane
- Successor: G. Ashton Oldham
- Previous post: Coadjutor Bishop of Albany (1904-1913)

Orders
- Ordination: May 27, 1884 by John Williams
- Consecration: May 19, 1904 by William Croswell Doane

Personal details
- Born: November 10, 1859 New York City, New York, United States
- Died: April 25, 1931 (aged 71) Albany, New York, United States
- Denomination: Anglican
- Parents: Edward Delavan Nelson & Susan Blanchard Bleecker McDonald
- Spouse: Harriet Schuyler Anderson (m. 1885)
- Children: 2

Richard Henry Nelson (November 10, 1859 – April 25, 1931) was the second bishop of the Episcopal Diocese of Albany in the United States from 1913 to 1929, as well as being coadjutor from 1904 to 1913 under the first bishop, William Croswell Doane.

== Biography ==
Nelson attended Trinity Collage where he was a member of the Fraternity of Delta Psi (St. Anthony Hall) and received a B.A. He also attended the University of Pennsylvania, receiving a M.A. and D.D.

Nelson was Rector of St. Peter's Episcopal Church in Philadelphia until 1903. Nelson was elected in 1903 as a bishop coadjutor of Albany. He "was consecrated at a most impressive service in the Cathedral, [on] May 19, 1904."

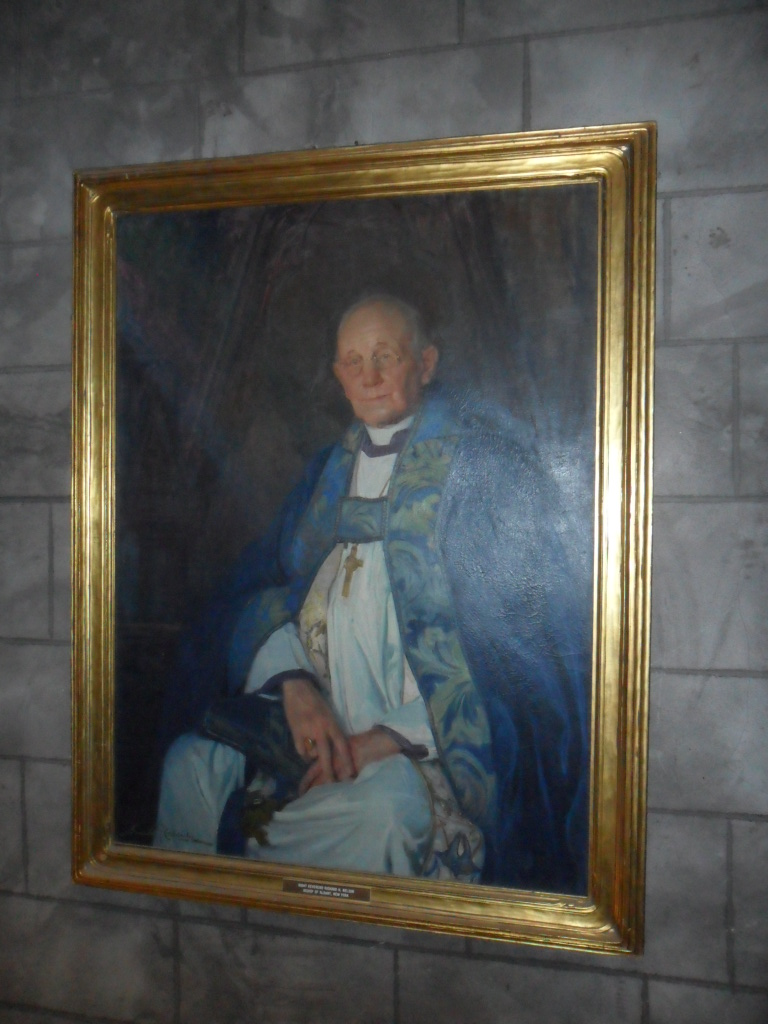
Painting of Richard H. Nelson by Gerald R. Cassidy at the Cathedral of All Saints (Albany, New York)

He served as a bishop for almost thirty years, an extraordinarily long time. Nelson was highly active during all that time: preaching, confirming, and consecrating persons, especially in the northern mission of the diocese in the Adirondack Mountains.

He was replaced by G. Ashton Oldham.

== See also ==
- List of Episcopal bishops (U.S.)

Episcopal Church (USA) titles
Preceded by William Croswell Doane	2nd Bishop of Albany; 1913–1929	Succeeded by G. Ashton Oldham
