= David Ball (bishop) =

American bishop

The Right Reverend David Standish Ball
- Bishop of Albany
- Church: Episcopal Church
- Diocese: Albany
- Elected: October 10, 1983
- In office: 1984–1998
- Predecessor: Wilbur E. Hogg
- Successor: Daniel W. Herzog
- Previous post: Coadjutor Bishop of Albany (1984)

Orders
- Ordination: December 21, 1953 by Frederick L. Barry
- Consecration: February 20, 1984 by John Allin

Personal details
- Born: June 11, 1926 Albany, New York, United States
- Died: April 18, 2017 (aged 90) Loudonville, New York, United States
- Buried: Albany Rural Cemetery
- Denomination: Anglican
- Parents: Percival Ledger Ball & Hazelton Vos
- Education: Colgate University

David Standish Ball (June 11, 1926 – April 18, 2017) was the seventh bishop of the Episcopal Diocese of Albany in the United States from 1984 to 1998.

== Childhood, education and calling ==
David Standish Ball was born June 11, 1926, in Albany, New York, the son of Percival and Hazelton Ball. He attended The Milne School in Albany, where he was class president and a popular athlete. Ball served in the United States Navy during World War II. He graduated from Colgate University in 1950.

He answered the call to holy orders in the Episcopal Church. He attended the General Theological Seminary in New York City from 1950 to 1953.

He was ordained a deacon on June 14, 1953, and a priest on December 21, 1953, in Albany. He served as a curate at Bethesda Church in Saratoga Springs, in upstate New York, for three years.

He was elected canon in 1956, serving until 1961. He served three years as Canon Sacrist and two years as Canon Precentor.

He was then elected dean of the Cathedral of All Saints in Albany in 1960, and served over two decades, until 1984. During that time, he served on a number of non-profit boards, including as President of the Dudley Park Housing Authority, which developed a housing project in Arbor Hill, Albany, New York.

== Bishop of Albany ==
On October 10, 1983, Ball was elected Bishop coadjutor of Albany at the age of 57. In February 1984, he was consecrated in apostolic succession by Presiding Bishop John Maury Allin, bishop David E. Richards, formerly suffragan of Albany and then bishop of the Anglican diocese of Central America, and the incumbent sixth bishop Wilbur Emory Hogg. Upon Bishop Hogg's retirement, in October 1984, Ball was installed in the cathedra in the choir at the Cathedral of All Saints, as the 7th Bishop of Albany.

Ball served from 1984 to 1998 as the seventh Diocesan bishop of Albany.

Ball opposed women's ordination in the 1970s and was briefly associated with the Episcopal Synod of America but later changed his position, serving with and ordaining female priests and deacons since at least 1989.

He took part in several consecrations of other bishops, including that of his successors. He was considered a conservative on issues such as apostolic succession.

He retired in 1998, at the then mandatory retirement age of 72.

== In retirement ==
Upon his retirement, Ball was succeeded by then-bishop Daniel W. Herzog. Ball again became active in many local charities. The Bishop Ball Golf Tournament, an annual fundraiser for the cathedral, is named in his honor. The Doane Stuart School, on whose board he sat until mid-2008, named a trustee award for him.

Ball continued to serve as Bishop-in Residence at the Cathedral of All Saints. He gained a reputation on such issues as ecumenism and alternate oversight in the Anglican Communion.

Ball died in Loudonville, New York on April 18, 2017.

== See also ==
- Historical list of bishops of the Episcopal Church in the United States of America

Episcopal Church (USA) titles
Preceded by Wilbur Hogg	Bishop of Albany; 1984–1998	Succeeded by Daniel W. Herzog
