= Daniel W. Herzog =

American Anglican bishop (1941–2023)

The Right Reverend Daniel William Herzog
- Bishop Emeritus of Albany
- Church: Episcopal Church
- Diocese: Albany
- Elected: May 31, 1997
- In office: 1998–2007
- Predecessor: David Standish Ball
- Successor: William H. Love
- Other posts: Retired assisting bishop, Anglican Diocese of the Living Word (2021–2023)
- Previous post: Coadjutor Bishop of Albany (1997–1998)

Orders
- Ordination: 1971
- Consecration: November 29, 1997 by Edmond L. Browning

Personal details
- Born: July 9, 1941 Ogdensburg, New York, U.S.
- Died: August 4, 2023 (aged 82)
- Denomination: Anglican (prev. Roman Catholic)
- Spouse: Carol Herzog
- Children: 5
- Education: St. Bonaventure University, Nashotah House, St. Lawrence University

Daniel William Herzog (July 9, 1941 – August 4, 2023) was an American Anglican bishop. He served in the Diocese of Albany from 1998 to 2007. After his retirement, he became a Roman Catholic, but returned to the Episcopal Church three years later. He left it once again to join the Anglican Church in North America in 2021.

== Biography ==
Daniel William Herzog was born in Ogdensburg, New York, on July 9, 1941. He was raised in the Roman Catholic Church. In 1964 he graduated from St. Bonaventure University. He married and had five children. He and his wife joined the Episcopal Church in the late 1960s. Herzog studied at Nashotah House, graduating in 1970, and was ordained a priest in the Episcopal Church. In 1971 he received a master's degree in education from St. Lawrence University.

Herzog served as director of personnel at the St. Lawrence Psychiatric Center in Ogdensburg while serving as assistant rector of an Episcopal parish there. He later served as Rector of Christ Church, Schenectady.

In 1997 he was elected coadjutor bishop of Albany; he was elected on the first ballot. The following year he succeeded as 8th Bishop of Albany when Bishop David Standish Ball retired. In 2003 he issued a pastoral letter opposing the election of Gene Robinson, a gay man, as Bishop of New Hampshire, and opposing the blessing of sexual relationships outside marriage.

== Retirement, departure to Rome, and return ==
Herzog retired as Bishop of Albany on January 31, 2007. He was succeeded by Bishop William Love, who had been elected coadjutor bishop on March 25, 2006.

In March 2007, Herzog and his wife Carol joined the Roman Catholic Church. He was the third bishop of the Episcopal Church in the United States to become a Roman Catholic, the others being Levi Silliman Ives in 1852 and Frederick Joseph Kinsman in 1919. Herzog explained his decision in a letter sent to his successor Bishop Love on March 19, 2007. Herzog's predecessor in Albany, Bishop Ball, expressed concern at Herzog's departure. His successor, Bishop Love, stated that Herzog and his wife would continue to be welcome at diocesan events.

In April 2010, presiding bishop Katharine Jefferts Schori promulgated his restoration to the ordained ministry of the Episcopal Church. His return to ECUSA was page one news.

In March 2021 Herzog announced that he would be resigning from ministry in the Episcopal church due to unspecified disagreements with the direction the church was headed. At the time of his statement, Herzog was serving as priest-in-charge of St. Augustine Episcopal Church in Ilion, New York, a position Herzog said that he would stay in until Easter of 2021. On April 3, 2021, former Albany Bishop William Love announced that he would be joining Anglican Diocese of the Living Word, a diocese within the Anglican Church of North America, as an Assistant Bishop. A week later on April 10, 2021, Herzog also announced that he would be joining the Anglican Church of North America and would be serving in ministry in the Anglican Diocese of the Living Word.

In retirement, Herzog pastored an ACNA church plant in the Utica area.

He died of neurosarcoidosis on August 4, 2023, at the age of 82.

== See also ==
- List of Episcopal bishops (U.S.)

Episcopal Church (USA) titles
Preceded by David Standish Ball	8th Bishop of Albany; 1998–2007	Succeeded by William Love
