= G. Ashton Oldham =

English bishop

The Right Reverend George Ashton Oldham D.D., S.T.D., L.H.D.
- Bishop of Albany
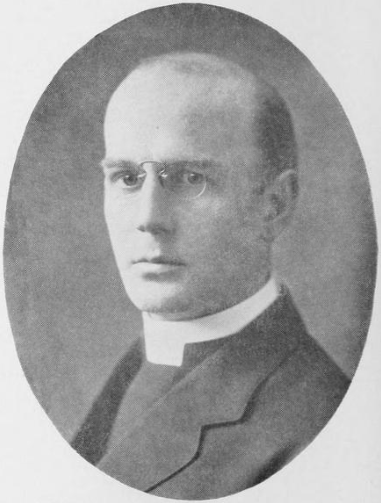
- Church: Episcopal Church
- Diocese: Albany
- In office: 1929–1949
- Predecessor: Richard H. Nelson
- Successor: Frederick L. Barry
- Previous post: Coadjutor Bishop of Albany (1922-1929)

Orders
- Ordination: June 10, 1906 by David H. Greer
- Consecration: October 24, 1922 by Richard H. Nelson

Personal details
- Born: August 15, 1877 Monkwearmouth, Sunderland, England
- Died: April 7, 1963 (aged 85) Litchfield, Connecticut, United States
- Denomination: Anglican
- Parents: Joseph Rodgers Oldham & Mary Elizabeth Shaw Banks
- Spouse: Emily Pierrepont Gould
- Children: 4

George Ashton Oldham (August 15, 1877 – April 7, 1963) was the third bishop of the Episcopal Diocese of Albany in the United States from 1929 to 1950, during the turbulent times of the Great Depression and World War II. He was also notable as the primary author of the catechism used in the American Episcopal Church for decades until 1979. Now largely forgotten, Oldham was a major religious leader for several decades in the middle of the 20th century and a serious candidate for presiding bishop.

== Early life ==
Oldham grew up in Cleveland, Ohio, and attended Cornell University, where he was an active debater, and graduated with an A.B. in 1902. (Note: One source claims he graduated in 1905, but this can not be confirmed, and is refuted by other, more reliable sources.) He served as a chaplain at Columbia University while in seminary in 1906. In 1908, he graduated from the General Theological Seminary with his bachelor's degree in divinity.

== Marriage ==
Oldham was married to Emily Pierrepont Gould (March 24, 1884 – October 31, 1969), from a very old and wealthy family. She was noted in the Social Register of New York of 1914, among other years. She was the daughter of Mary Pierrepont Perry and James Henry Gould (1844-1896), and a direct descendant of James Pierpont, the founder of Yale University. Their society wedding was announced in the New York Tribune, which was set for January 14, 1915, to be celebrated by Bishop Greer at the Cathedral of St. John the Divine. Emily Pierrepont Gould was a distant cousin of Aaron Burr through James Pierpont.

At the time of his marriage, Oldham was rector of St. Luke's Episcopal Church at Convent Avenue and West 141st Street in Manhattan, which was next to Hamilton Grange, the home of Alexander Hamilton.

== Work as bishop ==
Oldham was elected Bishop Coadjutor of Albany in 1922, to prepare for replacing Richard Henry Nelson.

In 1924, Oldham made a major sermon, entitled "America First", at the Washington National Cathedral. However, it was not necessarily made in support of the controversial "America First" movement:

His message was a more compassionate one, a call to transform ourselves into a nation that is first in "things of spirit", rather than "treading again the old, worn, bloody pathway which ends inevitably in chaos and disaster".

— David Walsh, Independence Day Blog.

His sermon on "The church's responsibility for world peace" was also widely published. He was a keynote speaker at the 1931 dedication of the War Memorial in Ithaca, New York, place of his alma mater, Cornell.

Oldham was an organizer of a conference on Anglo-Catholicism in Albany. He was also active in ecumenism with the Roman Catholic Church, long before that became popular.

He was installed in 1929 in the cathedra in the choir at the Cathedral of All Saints, as the 3rd Bishop of Albany. That would be a terribly unlucky year to begin any ministry, as the Great Depression was to start with the Stock Market Crash of 1929.

Oldham wrote the Catechism Today: Instructions on the Church, the catechism used in the American Episcopal Church for decades until 1979. He also wrote a book entitled The Fighting Church.

He was very active in Episcopal Church activities, from at least 1932. In 1937, he was a serious candidate for election as presiding bishop. By the end of the war in 1945, he was acknowledged as a church leader. In 1947, Bishop and Mrs. Oldham attended a conference in Sydney, Australia, and on their way home from New Zealand, the seaplane pilot, in order "to avoid disaster was [forced] to jettison cargo and passengers' luggage to lighten the load." Lost in "the Oldham luggage [was] ... the cope the bishop had worn at his consecration".

In 1949, he received an honorary degree from Hobart College. The deanery of the Cathedral of All Saints is named Oldham House in his honor.

He retired as bishop in 1950 and died in 1963. He was replaced by Bishop Frederick L. Barry, whose death he announced to a diocesan convention in 1960.

== See also ==
- List of Episcopal bishops (U.S.)

== Notes ==
Episcopal Church (USA) titles
Preceded by Richard Henry Nelson	3rd Bishop of Albany; 1929 – 1950	Succeeded by Frederick L. Barry
