= William Croswell Doane =

American bishop

The Right Reverend William Croswell Doane
- Bishop of Albany
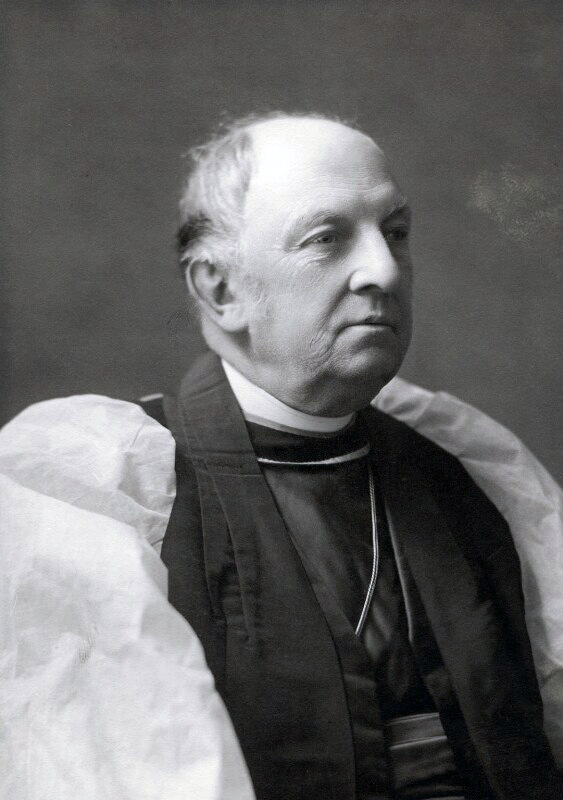
- William Croswell Doane in 1898
- Church: Episcopal Church
- Diocese: Albany
- Elected: December 3, 1868
- In office: 1869–1913
- Successor: Richard H. Nelson

Orders
- Ordination: March 16, 1856 by George Washington Doane
- Consecration: February 2, 1869 by Horatio Potter

Personal details
- Born: March 2, 1832 Boston, Massachusetts, United States
- Died: March 17, 1913 (aged 81) New York City, New York, United States
- Buried: Cathedral of All Saints (Albany, New York)
- Denomination: Anglican
- Parents: George Washington Doane & Eliza Greene Perkins Callahan
- Spouse: Sarah Katharine Condit
- Children: 2

William Croswell Doane (March 2, 1832, in Boston – May 17, 1913, in New York City) was the first bishop of the Episcopal Diocese of Albany in the Northeastern United States. He was bishop from 1869 until his death in 1913.

Doane served about 60 years in ordained ministry, a huge span for those times. As bishop, he managed the construction of the Cathedral of All Saints in Albany, the first Episcopal cathedral (the central church of a diocese, conference, or episcopate) in the United States. It is now on the National Register of Historic Places. Doane is probably best known today for his Anglican hymn, "Ancient of Days".

== Early life ==
Doane was born in Boston, and named for his father's best friend, the Rev. William Croswell. When he was born, his father, the Rev. George Doane, was Rector of the prominent Trinity Church, Boston, located on Copley Square.

Within a year, his father was elected second Bishop of New Jersey (since the American Revolutionary War and establishment of the American Episcopal Church). The family settled in the see of Burlington, New Jersey, which had been settled largely by Quakers in colonial times and also has the oldest Episcopal church in the state. Doane attended the private Episcopal Burlington College there, founded in 1846 by his father.

He graduated from Burlington College, where he and two friends had co-founded the fourth, or "Delta" chapter of the fraternity Delta Psi. After college, Doane became an Episcopal priest. Like his father, he became involved in the Oxford Movement, which sought to restore richness of practice to the liturgy.

== Clergy ==
Doane was ordained a deacon on March 6, 1853, by his father at his home parish of St. Mary's. Shortly thereafter, he married the former Sarah Katharine Condit, daughter of Joel W. and Margaret Harrison Condit of Newark, New Jersey, and his two children were born in Burlington, Eliza Greene in 1854, and Margaret Harrison in 1858. After he was ordained a priest in 1856 in the same church, he was called to St. Barnabas Free Church in Burlington. He served there until 1860.

In 1863, Doane accepted a call to St. John's Church, Hartford, Connecticut, and he served there during the American Civil War. His parishioner Mark Twain pulled a joke on Doane, claiming, "I have…a book at home containing every word" of Doane's sermon that Sunday, then sent him an unabridged dictionary.

Doane was called to Albany, New York in 1867 to serve "the venerable parish of St. Peter's, Albany." The General Convention of 1868, in New York City, founded a new diocese of Albany. Doane was elected the first bishop at the organizational convention of the diocese in St. Peter's Church. His election had "strong opposition," because he was a "young rector," but also because "the evangelical element…looked upon Mr. Doane as a high churchman, [with] his ritualistic practices...." adopted as part of the Oxford Movement influence.

On February 3, 1869, Doane was consecrated as the 92nd bishop of the Episcopal Church at the Church of God at St. Peter's Church, on the Feast of the Purification. His consecrators were:Right Reverend Horatio Potter, Bishop of New York; The Right Reverend William H. Odenheimer; and The Right Reverend Henry A. Neely.

== Work as Bishop ==
Doane had a large diocese, and spent many years in visitation, establishing churches, and confirming persons. For many years his biggest project was supervising the building of the Cathedral of All Saints, his major legacy. He got the land donated by the wealthy Erastus Corning. The cathedral was incorporated in 1873, and the laying of its cornerstone on a downtown site on June 3, 1884, took place "with impressive ceremony." With construction complete enough for the building to be used, the Cathedral of All Saints was dedicated in 1888. Doane liked Gothic architecture for Episcopal churches for its spiritual quality.

Until that time, smaller Episcopal churches had served as seats of the bishop. The "cathedral idea"—the concept that a bishop's main church is more than a parish church, and is the "Mother church"—had not yet taken hold in the United States. It is sometimes called the "Pioneer Cathedral" because of that. Doane and the congregation planned a cathedral complex, to include convent, cloister, hospital and school. He established the girls' school in 1870, and the convent and hospital in 1874. Much of the building was paid for in a gift by his friend, J. Pierpont Morgan. The church is listed on the National Register of Historic Places.

By 1890 Bishop Doane was in charge of the "Foreign Chapels" of the Episcopal Church. In 1892, he addressed the General Convention in Baltimore, urging the necessity of Christian education.

In keeping with his plans for the cathedral and Oxford Movement traditions, Doane established an ambitious music program at the cathedral. In the late 19th century, he founded a boy's choir school (now defunct) and the Cathedral Choir of Men and Boys.

Doane was active in speaking out against the women's suffrage movement, which he opposed on the grounds that God had given men dominion over women and that women's 'natural' place was in the home caring for their children. He wrote that "an enlarged unqualified suffrage... [is] an aggravated misery [and a] threatening danger". So influential were his views that suffragist Ellen Battelle Dietrick's last book, Women in the Early Christian Ministry (1897)—in which she offered a refutation of Christian teachings that relegated women to second-class status—was subtitled "A Reply to Bishop Doane, and Others".

Doane died at the age of 81 in New York City in 1913, while traveling. His Coadjutor, Richard Henry Nelson, succeeded to the position of bishop of Albany.

== See also ==
- Historical list of bishops of the Episcopal Church in the United States of America

Episcopal Church (USA) titles
Preceded by	1st Bishop of Albany; 1869–1913	Succeeded by Richard H. Nelson
