= Jeremiah Williamson =

American clergyman

The Right Reverend Jeremiah David Williamson
- 10th Bishop of Albany
- Church: Episcopal Church
- Diocese: Albany
- In office: 2024−present
- Predecessor: William H. Love
- Previous posts: Rector, Grace and St. Stephen's Episcopal Church, Colorado Springs, Colorado (2016–2023); Rector, St. Andrews Episcopal Church, Toledo Ohio (2009–2016); Curate, St. Johns Episcopal Church, Youngstown Ohio (2006–2009)

Orders
- Ordination: April 17, 2007 by Mark Hollingsworth
- Consecration: February 24, 2024 by DeDe Duncan-Probe

Personal details
- Born: July 15, 1980 (age 46)
- Denomination: Anglican
- Spouse: Jennifer Williamson
- Children: 2
- Education: Drew Theological School (MDiv) Greenville University (B.A.)

Jeremiah David Williamson (born July 15, 1980) is an American prelate who has served as the 10th bishop of the Episcopal Diocese of Albany since February 2024. He served as rector of Grace and St. Stephen's Episcopal Church in Colorado Springs, Colorado from 2016 to 2023, as rector of St. Andrew's Episcopal Church, Toledo, Ohio from 2009 to 2016, and as curate of St. John's Episcopal Church, Youngstown, Ohio from 2006 to 2009. He was elected Bishop of the Diocese of Albany on September 9, 2023, and was consecrated on February 24, 2024.

== Early life and education ==
Williamson grew up in the eastern Ohio town of Dover and was raised by his parents, Connie and David Williamson. After growing up in the United Methodist Church in Dover, he converted to Pentecostalism and was a worship leader.

Williamson obtained a bachelor's degree from the Free Methodist Church–affiliated Greenville University in Greenville, Illinois. He earned a Master of Divinity from Drew University Theological School in Madison, New Jersey. Williamson has also received a diploma in Anglican Studies from General Theological Seminary and a certificate in diversity and inclusion from Cornell University.

== Clergy career ==
=== Parish ministry ===
On September 19, 2006, Williamson was ordained to the Sacred Order of Deacons by Bishop John Croneberger. He then served as a curate at St. Johns Episcopal Church in Youngstown, Ohio. There, he was tasked with campus ministry and urban missions. He was also named to the Board of Directors of the Mahoning Valley Association of Churches "Hands On" program. While he was serving as curate of St. Johns, he was ordained as a priest by Bishop Mark Hollingsworth on April 14, 2007. In April 2009, Williamson took the call to serve as Rector of St. Andrews Episcopal Church in Toledo, Ohio, where he led the integration of a non-denominational church into the parish worship space and was one of the regional deans of the Episcopal Diocese of Ohio. In 2016, he took the call to serve as the Rector of Grace and St. Stephen's Episcopal Church in Colorado Springs, Colorado. There, he led the parish through a remortgage process after the church had lost money due to an alleged theft of church funds. His parish opened its doors to victims after the Club Q shooting and held a vigil in their memory.

=== Episcopal ministry ===
Williamson was elected Bishop of the Diocese of Albany on September 9, 2023, and was consecrated on February 24, 2024. Williamson was elected on the fourth ballot. The lay order vote was 65–22, and the clergy vote was 56–54.

Williamson's tenure was preceded by turmoil within the diocese over the issue of same-sex marriage. His predecessor, William H. Love, was convicted of disobedience by an ecclesial court and resigned as bishop due to his refusal to allow same-sex ceremonies. Williamson supports same-sex marriage and has personally performed same-sex weddings.

== Personal life ==
Williamson is married to Jennifer Williamson, a United Methodist Church pastor. The Williamsons have two children.

Episcopal Church (USA) titles
| Preceded by William H. Love | 10th Bishop of Albany; 2024 to present | Succeeded by Incumbent |
