= William H. Love =

American prelate

The Right Reverend William H. Love
- Assisting Bishop in The Anglican Diocese in New England
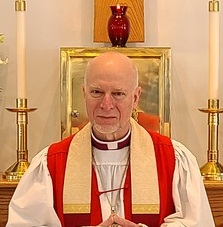
- Love in 2021
- Church: The Episcopal Church (United States) (2007–2021) Anglican Church in North America (2021–present)
- Diocese: Albany (2007–2021) Living Word (2021–2025) NewEngland (2025–present)
- Elected: ECUSA: 2006
- Appointed: ACNA: April 3, 2021
- Installed: ECUSA: 2007
- Term ended: ECUSA: 2021
- Predecessor: ECUSA: Daniel Herzog
- Successor: ECUSA: Jeremiah Williamson
- Other post: Coadjutor Bishop of Albany (2006-2007)

Orders
- Ordination: 1991 (diaconate); 1992 (priesthood)
- Consecration: September 16, 2006 by Frank Griswold

Personal details
- Born: August 14, 1957 (age 68) Dallas, Texas, United States
- Denomination: Continuing Anglican (formerly Episcopalian)
- Spouse: Colonel Karen Love (m. 1983)
- Children: 2

William Howard Love (born August 14, 1957, in Dallas, Texas) is an American prelate. Love was the ninth bishop of the Episcopal Diocese of Albany, and he served in that role from 2007 until 2021. From 2021 to 2025, Love served as assistant bishop of the Anglican Diocese of the Living Word. In 2025, he became assistant bishop of the Anglican Diocese in New England.

Love is known for his support for a traditional definition of marriage and for his opposition to the blessing of same-sex unions. In October 2020, Love was found to have violated Episcopal Church doctrine and rules due to his refusal to permit same-sex unions to be blessed by clergy within the Albany diocese. Effective February 1, 2021, Love resigned his position as bishop pursuant to a disciplinary agreement. He was later released from ordained ministry in the Episcopal Church.

== Education, early career, and family ==
According to the Episcopal Diocese of Albany, Love is a Texas native; he earned a Bachelor of Arts in journalism from Southwest Texas State in 1980, a Master of Science degree in education from the State University of New York-Plattsburgh in 1988, and a master's degree in Divinity in 1991 from Nashotah House.

Love was ordained a deacon in 1991 and a priest in 1992. He served as rector of St. Mary's Church in Lake Luzerne, New York for 14 years.

Prior to becoming a priest, he served as an intelligence officer in the Air Force.

Love married retired Air Force Colonel Karen Love in 1983; the Loves have two children and several grandchildren.

== Bishop of the Episcopal Diocese of Albany ==
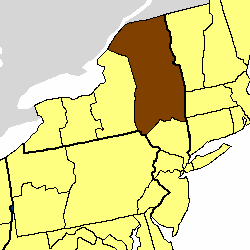
Location of the Diocese of Albany

Love was elected bishop coadjutor of the Episcopal Diocese of Albany on March 25, 2006; he received the consent of the General Convention that summer in Columbus, Ohio. Love was consecrated as bishop coadjutor by Presiding Bishop Frank Griswold on September 16, 2006, at the Empire State Plaza in Albany. On February 4, 2007, Love was installed as the ninth bishop of Albany.

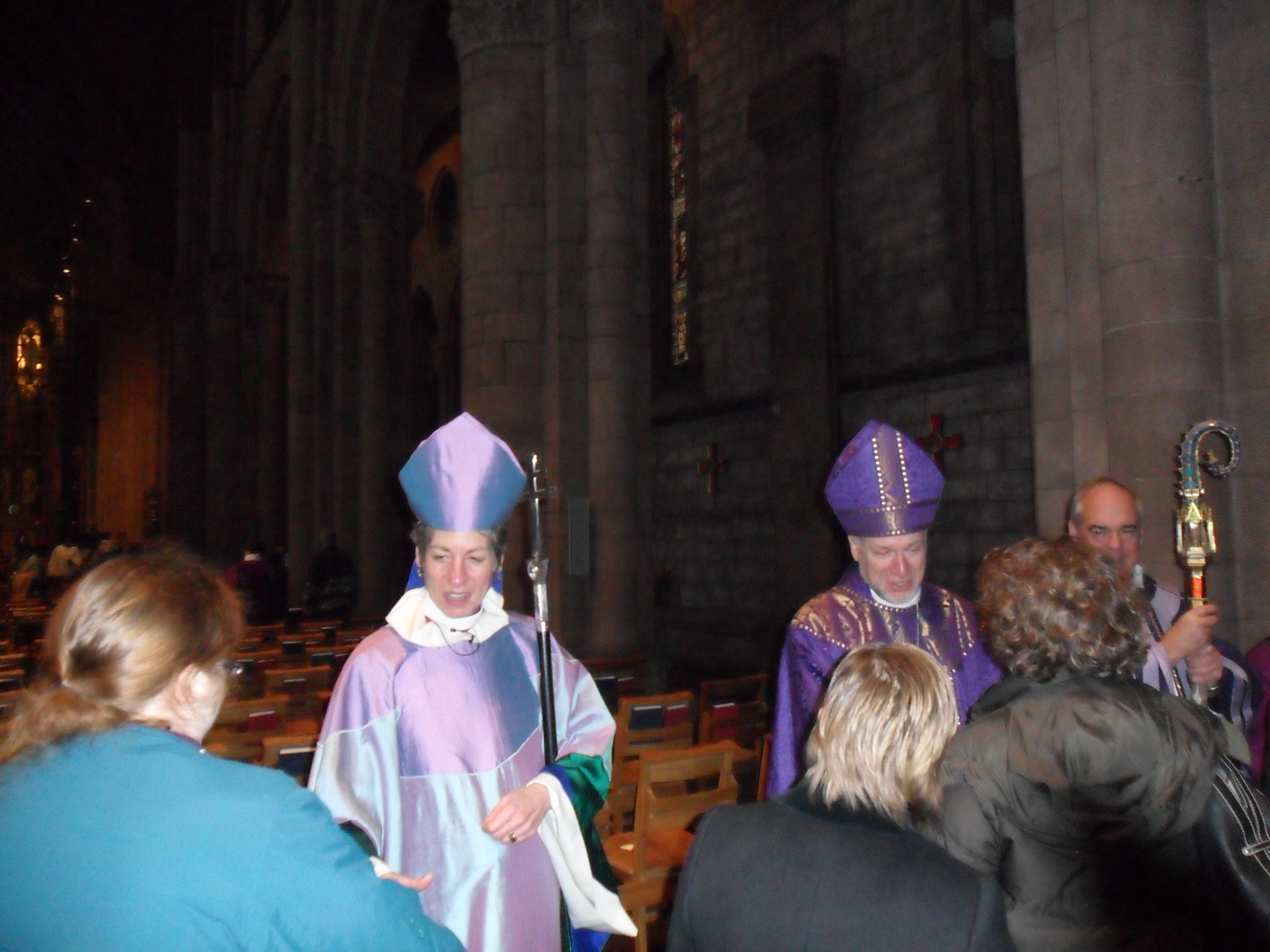
Love with Presiding Bishop Katharine Jefferts Schori at the Cathedral of All Saints, Albany, New York in 2011

Love has consistently stood for an orthodox view of the Bible and for the stance of the Anglican Communion on matters of human sexuality. He asserts that "the Bible is, in fact, the word of God. It's not just some historic document that was written some 2,000-plus years ago, but [is] God's revealed word." Regarding marriage, Love adheres to an orthodox interpretation of Scripture, affirming that sexual intimacy is reserved for marriage and that marriage is an opposite-sex union. Love takes the view that homosexually-oriented persons should remain celibate.

On January 19, 2008, Love celebrated the Eucharist at St. Andrew's Church in Albany while hosting a visit by Bonnie Anderson, president of the Episcopal Church's House of Deputies. A dialogue followed between progressives from Via Media and the more conservative representatives of the church, and "stressed unity and communication". Both liberals and conservatives in the diocese praised Love for attending the event. The national church's web site posted a story about the event, quoting Bishop Love and several of the 300 attendees at the event.

In June 2008, under Love's leadership, the Episcopal Diocese of Albany passed a resolution stating that only heterosexual marriages would be celebrated within the diocese. After the resolution was passed, Bishop Love was quoted as stating that "the important thing ... is that God loves all people, regardless of where they might be in their life. That doesn't necessarily mean he approves of all of our behaviors."

Love gained national attention at the Episcopal Church's July 2009 convention in Anaheim, California. At that convention, the Church passed a resolution allowing the blessing of same-sex unions. At a news conference organized by a conservative Anglican group, Love said, "It is breaking my heart to see the church destroy itself"; however, he vowed to remain within the Episcopal Church nonetheless. In October 2009, after the Vatican announced a canonical framework to integrate groups of disaffected Anglicans into the Roman Catholic Church, Love commented: "What state we are in when we get through this, only God knows..." He also acknowledged that two parishes in the Diocese of Albany were attempting to leave the Episcopal Church. As of 2012, Love had granted Delegated Ecclesiastical Parish Oversight (DEPO)—a status where certain parishes remain a part of a diocese, but receive certain pastoral functions from a bishop outside that diocese—to three parishes: St. Luke's, Saranac Lake; St. George's, Schenectady; and St. John's, Essex.

=== Dissent, discipline, and departure ===
In 2015, the General Convention of the Episcopal Church "sanctioned gay marriage across the American church but [allowed] the bishops of eight dioceses [including Albany] to opt out." In July 2018, the General Convention of the Episcopal Church passed a resolution allowing same-sex weddings to be performed in the eight dissenting dioceses. Love strongly opposed the resolution. In November 2018, he issued a pastoral directive banning same-sex weddings from being held by clergy in the Episcopal Diocese of Albany; in an accompanying letter, Love wrote: "Recent statistics show that The Episcopal Church is spiraling downward... I can't help but believe that God has removed His blessing from this Church. Unless something changes, The Episcopal Church is going to die."

In response to Love's pastoral directive, Presiding Bishop Michael Curry placed Love on a partial ministry restriction. A June 12, 2020 disciplinary hearing was held to determine whether Love had violated church law by refusing to allow same-sex weddings to be conducted by Episcopal clergy in the Diocese of Albany. On October 2, 2020, a disciplinary panel ruled that Love had violated Episcopal doctrine and rules. On October 24, 2020, Love announced his resignation as bishop pursuant to a disciplinary agreement with church authorities. His resignation became effective on February 1, 2021.

On March 29, 2021, Love was—at his own request—released and removed from the ordained ministry by Presiding Bishop Michael Curry. On March 30, 2021, Love announced that he would be leaving ministry in the Episcopal church to join the Anglican Church in North America (ACNA). (Earlier the same year, Love's predecessor as Bishop of Albany, Daniel W. Herzog, also announced that he was leaving Episcopal ministry.) Four priests and four deacons left the Diocese of Albany in protest following Love's departure. Bishop Love was succeeded as Bishop of Albany by Jeremiah Williamson.

== Anglican Church in North America ==
The Anglican Diocese of the Living Word, a diocese within the ACNA, announced its appointment of Love as assisting bishop on April 3, 2021.

In January 2025, Love became assistant bishop of the Anglican Diocese in New England.

== See also ==
- List of Episcopal bishops of the United States
- Historical list of the Episcopal bishops of the United States
- List of Bishop Succession in the Episcopal Church

Episcopal Church (USA) titles
Preceded by Daniel W. Herzog	9th Bishop of Albany; 2007 to 2021	Succeeded by Jeremiah Williamson
