= Trinity Episcopal Church (Ashland, New York) =

Historic church in New York, United States

- U.S. National Register of Historic Places
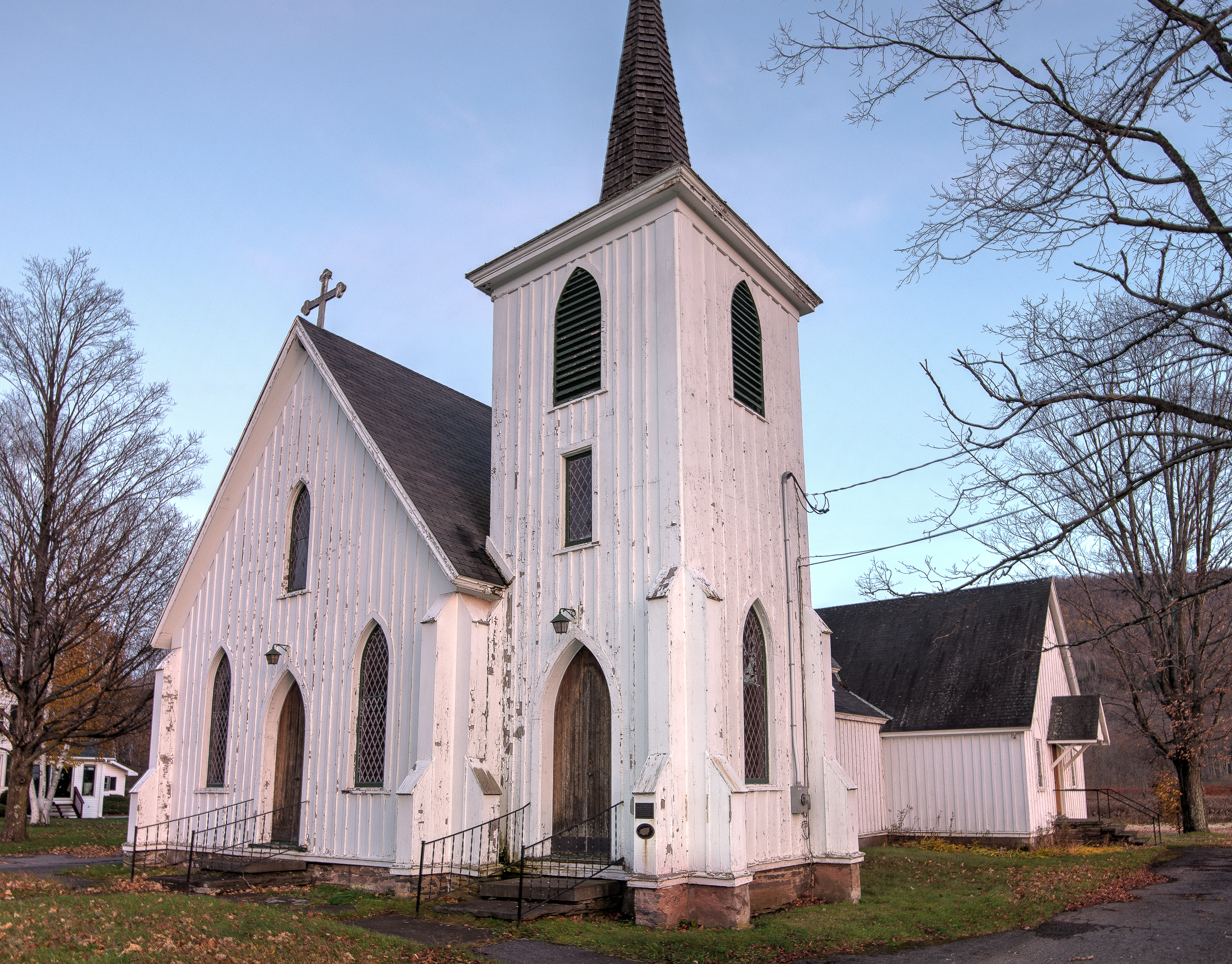

- Location within New York Location within the United States
- Location: NY 23, SW of jct. with Co. Rd. 19, Ashland, New York
- Coordinates: 42°17′53″N 74°17′54″W
- Area: less than one acre
- Built: 1879
- Architect: Stitts, Mr.
- Architectural style: Late Gothic Revival
- NRHP reference No.: 96001438
- Added to NRHP: December 6, 1996

Trinity Episcopal Church is a historic Episcopal church on NY 23, southwest of the junction with Co. Rd. 19 in Ashland, Greene County, New York. It was built in 1879 and is a one-story, three by three bay, wood-frame structure clad with board and batten siding in the Gothic Revival style. It features a three-story entry / bell tower.

It was added to the National Register of Historic Places in 1996.
