= Art in Bloom =

The phrase Art In Bloom is often used as the title of various exhibits held annually, usually in spring, in art museums. The phrase was created by a Museum of Fine Arts, Boston, volunteer, Lorraine M. Pitts who also helped found the Danforth Museum in Framingham, MA. The exhibit is composed of traditional visual art pieces and corresponding flower arrangements done by local professional florists and garden club members.

The original exhibit was held in the Museum of Fine Arts in Boston in 1976, where it is held annually; other institutions hosting such displays include the Minneapolis Institute of Arts, the Art Gallery of Greater Victoria, the North Carolina Museum of Art, and the Saint Louis Art Museum in St. Louis, Missouri. Universities such as the University of Missouri's Museum of Art and Archaeology in Columbia, Missouri also hold "Art in Bloom" exhibitions. The Museum Of Fine Arts, St. Petersburg, Florida, has also hosted an Art In Bloom weekend each spring since 1996.
