= Cathedral of All Saints (Albany, New York) =

Historic church in New York, United States

The Cathedral of All Saints
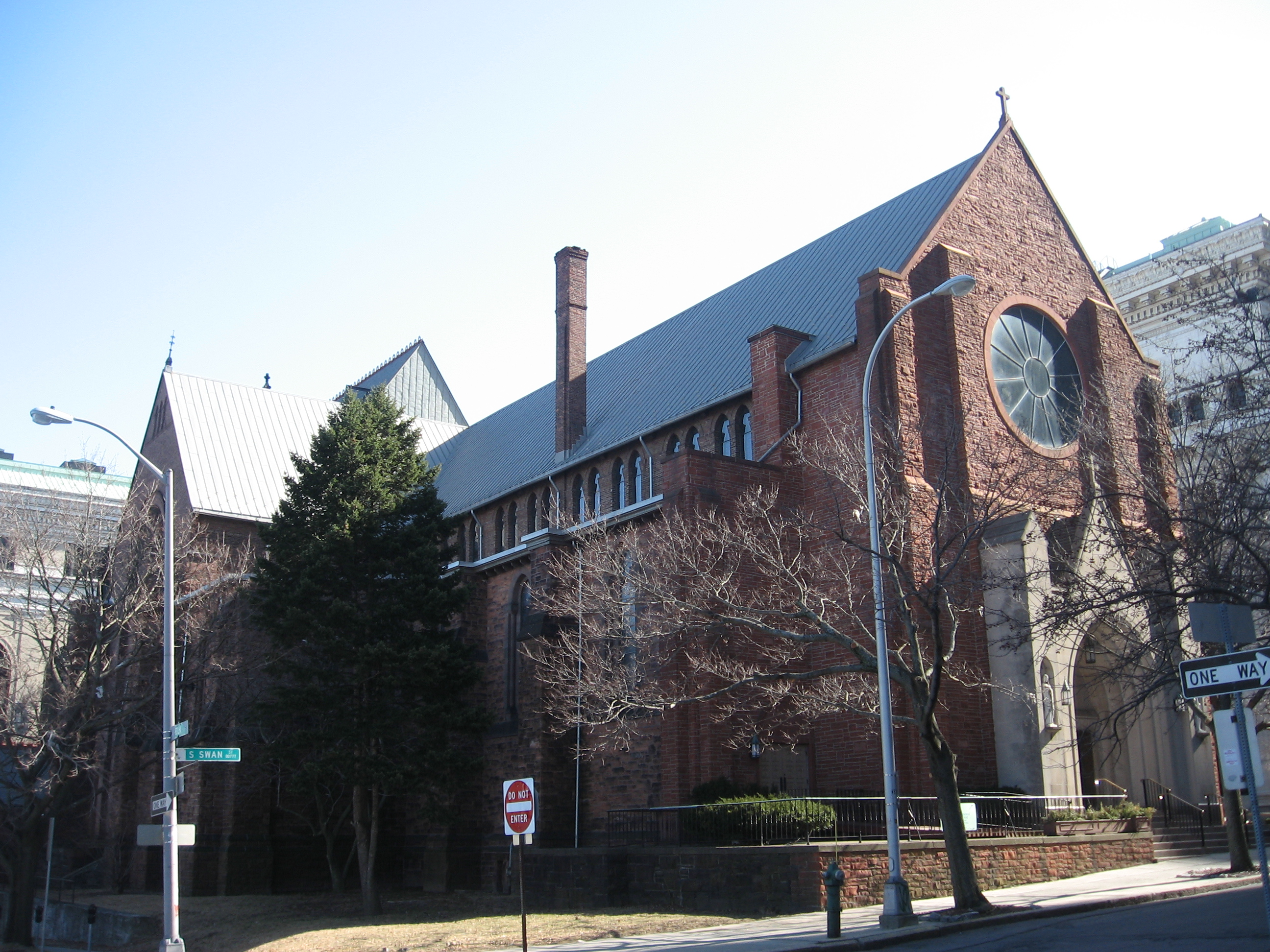
- The Cathedral of All Saints
- Location: 62 S. Swan Street, Albany, New York, U.S.
- Country: United States
- Denomination: Episcopal
- Churchmanship: Anglo-Catholic

Architecture
- Architect: Robert W. Gibson
- Style: Neo-Gothic
- Groundbreaking: June 3, 1884
- Completed: 1888

Administration
- Diocese: Episcopal Diocese of Albany

Clergy
- Bishop: Jeremiah Williamson
- Dean: Dr. Leander S. Harding
- Cathedral of All Saints
- U.S. National Register of Historic Places
- Location within New York
- Coordinates: 42°39′16″N 73°45′29″W
- Area: 2 acres (0.81 ha)
- Built: 1884
- NRHP reference No.: 74001213
- Added to NRHP: July 25, 1974

The Cathedral of All Saints, Albany, New York, is located on Elk Street in central Albany, New York, United States. It is the central church of the Episcopal Diocese of Albany and the seat of the Episcopal Bishop of Albany. Built in the 1880s in the Gothic style and designed by Robert W. Gibson, it was listed on the National Register of Historic Places in 1974. Previously it had been recognized as a contributing property to the Lafayette Park Historic District, listed on the Register in 1970.

It was the first Episcopal Cathedral church in the United States to be built expressly as such, rather than a local parish being chosen to serve as the church of a bishop, and for that reason, it is also called the Pioneer Cathedral. The church was unable to complete the cathedral and the large planned complex in the early 20th century. Because the commissioner of the State Education Department had his headquarters built on the remainder of the block, the remainder of the cathedral will never be completed. Some foundations for planned expansions remain, however, for instance, for spires.

The cathedral reported 399 members in 2023. Plate and pledge income for the congregation in 2024 was $271,919 with average Sunday attendance (ASA) of 84.

== Building ==
The cathedral is located on the south corner of the intersection of Elk and South Swan Streets. The terrain slopes gently toward the Hudson River a half-mile (1 km) to the east, and sharply into Sheridan Hollow and Arbor Hill to the immediate north. The cathedral's 2-acre (8,100 m^{2}) lot is in the northern corner of the Lafayette Park Historic District, at the edge of central Albany's developed area.

On three sides the cathedral has as its neighbors larger state government buildings, some of them also historic. The neoclassical State Education Department Building, also listed on the National Register, occupies the rest of the block, exceeding the cathedral in height. Beyond it is the state capitol, a contributing property to the Lafayette Park Historic District and designated as a National Historic Landmark. Across South Swan are the offices of New York's Department of State. South of it is the 34-story Alfred E. Smith State Office Building, a contributing property to the Center Square/Hudson–Park Historic District. Other than one small group of rowhouses, the space across the Elk is all parking lots.

The cathedral was designed in the shape of a modified Greek cross with short transepts and squared ends. It is largely finished in split-cut Potsdam sandstone, with decorative trim in brownstone. The east end has the greatest level of finish. A parking lot is in the southwest corner. At the southeast corner, in the space between the cathedral and the SED building, is a brick chapter house.

Inside, the cathedral interior is finished in the same East Longmeadow brownstone as the outside trim. The nave is laid out with two narrow side aisles, separated from the main section by large sets of engaged stone columns as much as 7 feet (2.1 m) wide. Six large stained glass windows provide light, supplemented by sunlight through the clear conventional glass in the clerestory windows. Its interior is graced by stone and wood carvings and by striking stained glass windows designed by Clayton and Bell of London, LaFarge, and other notable stained glass designers.

The wooden floor of the nave gives way to mosaic in the choir, sanctuary and two side chapels. Underneath it is supported by steel beams and brick arches. An intricately decorated iron and brass rood screen on a stone base sets the choir apart from the nave. Some of the clergy stalls in the rear have elaborate carvings. Behind them is a polychrome reredos, its niches filled with sculptures.

== History ==
Bishop William Croswell Doane, the first to head the new Diocese of Albany, began there in 1869. His major project, for many years, was raising funds and managing the building of the Cathedral of All Saints, his major legacy. Up to that point, no Episcopal diocese in the U.S. had built a true cathedral. Most had simply used the largest existing church in the diocese.

Doane's father, George Washington Doane, as second bishop of the Diocese of New Jersey, had commissioned Richard Upjohn to design St. Mary's in Burlington as the cathedral. But that building was not any larger than the English parish churches it was based on. (Upjohn also designed St. Peter's Church in Albany.

In Albany, Doane planned a cathedral like those in England, that served not only as the central church of the diocese but anchored a complex to include a convent, cloister, hospital and school. In 1870 he established a girls' school, and then incorporated the cathedral three years later, holding services in a former machine shop. A sisterhood and hospital were formally established in 1874. Erastus Corning donated the land.

With the land secured, Doane announced that a competition would be held for the design. It took until 1882 for the bishop to announce the winner: Robert W. Gibson. The then-unknown architect's design edged out a widely publicized design by the well-known Henry Hobson Richardson, who had already distinguished himself in Albany with his designs for the early stages of the state capitol and city hall. Richardson had worked hard on his design and was reportedly very disappointed that it was not chosen. However, he had apparently ignored most of Doane's requirements. Despite this, some architectural historians have mistakenly assumed the cathedral is his work.

Gibson's design was what Doane had wanted. A 29-year-old who had recently immigrated to the US from his native England, Gibson was aware of the Oxford Movement and its influence on Episcopal Church design. He had designed a building in the English Gothic mode so idealized by the Oxfordians, using stone for what the bishop called "instant antiquity," even as architects on other projects were experimenting with steel and brick. With Doane's guidance, Gibson modified his design for Albany's harsher winters by narrowing the windows.

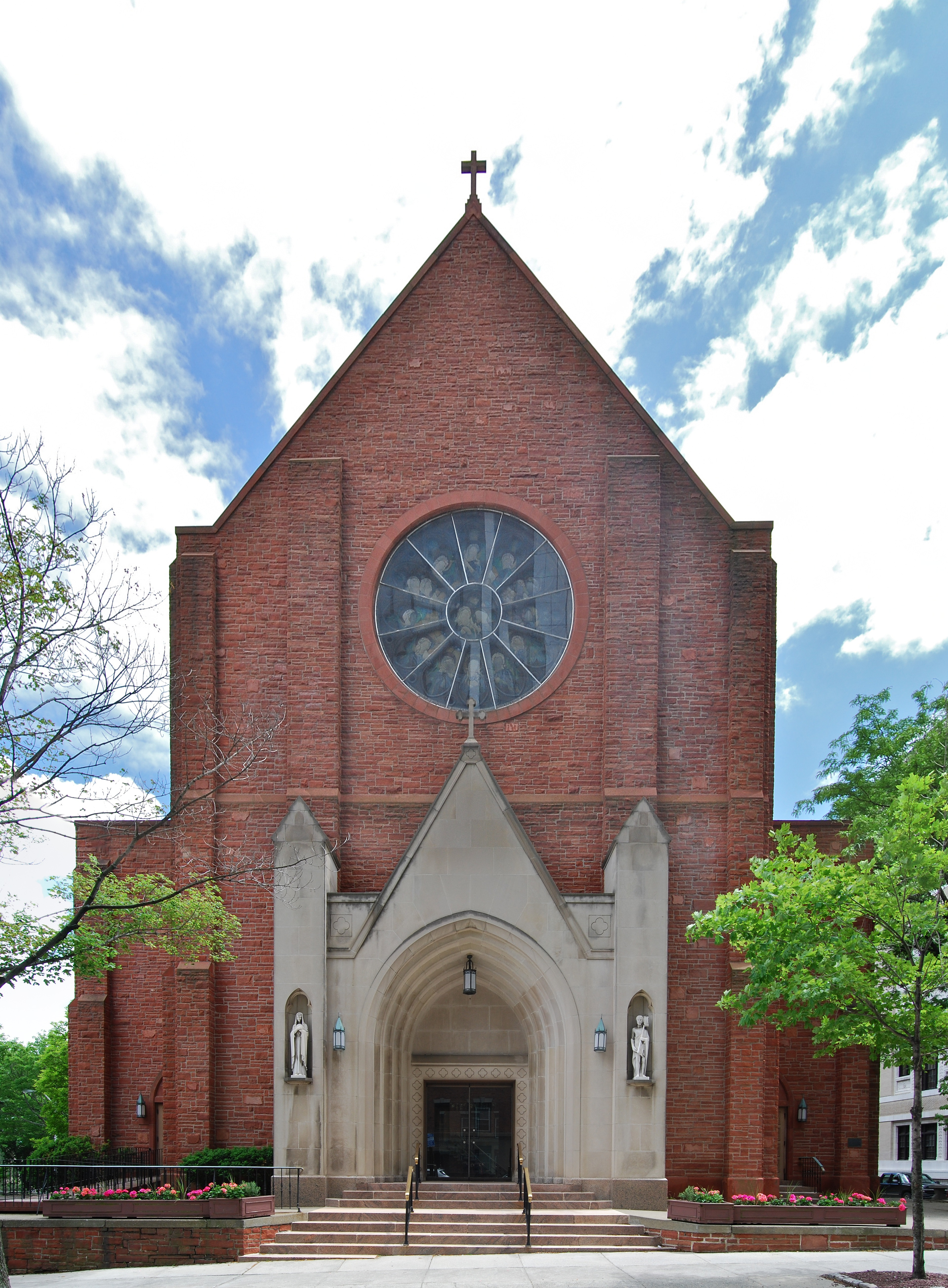
Front of the cathedral

Foundations were already in place when the cornerstone was laid in summer of 1884. Among those in attendance at the ceremony were J.P. Morgan, Theodore Roosevelt, Leland Stanford and Grover Cleveland. The first phase of construction proceeded carefully over the next several years.

Doane wanted the building to be functionally ready in all ways when opened, unlike the European models Gibson had followed, which were built and opened in stages. The side walls were built to 40 feet (12 m) and a temporary clerestory created in a roof that used the triforium for support. Louis Hinton, another English immigrant, did the interior stonecarving, which was not finished until 1891. John LaFarge designed the large rose window in the west wall, and the London firm of Clayton and Bell the wall windows. The carved choir stalls were salvaged from a demolished 17th-century church in Bruges, Belgium.

The Cathedral of All Saints was dedicated in 1888. The church and the diocese kept using the main building as it was completed. In the early years of the 20th century, the chapter house was completed. By 1909 the ceiling was complete to its intended level, and the permanent clerestory was unveiled. Much of the building was paid for with a gift from Doane's friend, J. Pierpont Morgan.

By that time, it had become clear that Doane's original plans for a mother-church complex would never come to pass. He had been able to buy some of the other lots on the block, but not all of them. While he was on a trip to Europe in 1906, Andrew S. Draper, the state's first Commissioner of Education, bought the other lots on the block fronting along Washington Avenue. He planned to have a headquarters built for his department, regardless of Doane's vision for his complex.

Doane had no choice but to sell the state his lots. He successfully lobbied the state to limit the number of stories the new building would have, but made an enemy of Draper in the process. The commissioner made sure that the height of each story was as great as he could get away with. When finished in 1913, the state building hid the cathedral from the sight of most of the rest of the city. Doane and Draper both died shortly thereafter.

The cathedral is permanently incomplete. Two foundations for the 210-foot (64 m) eastern spires which Gibson had planned remain on its eastern end. There has been no attempt to build those spires, and most work on the cathedral since the early 20th century has been largely maintenance, save for the occasional memorial stained glass window.

In 1948 the standing-seam metal on the original roof was replaced with asphalt shingles. During the next decade, the most significant renovation work took place. The original wood in the nave floor was replaced with reinforced concrete, and the heating system was upgraded. A kitchen, multi-purpose room and Sunday school classroom were built in the undercroft.

The facade on the west entrance, of Potsdam sandstone with Indiana limestone trim, was built in 1971. The roof shingles were replaced again thirty years later as part of a renovation project. There have been no other changes to the building.

=== Past clergy ===
William Croswell Doane founded the cathedral, and was its first chief clergyman. There followed a number of notable bishops and deans of the cathedral, including some who became national figures.

The dean emeritus of the cathedral is The Very Rev. Marshall Vang, who served for a decade as its pastor.

William Love, a former Episcopal bishop of Albany, served at the Cathedral of All Saints as a Dean's Vicar in the 1980s, and from 2007 to 2021, as its Bishop. The retired bishop The Right Rev. David Standish Ball continued to serve until his death in April 2017.

== Architecture ==
The construction for the cathedral began in 1888, and it remains unfinished, although its slate roof was recently replaced. The altar of the old Saint Alban's chapel in the cathedral was moved to St. Paul's church in the village of Salem, New York.

The cathedral is noted as a tourist destination for its Gothic architecture, and especially for its multi-colored stained glass windows, stone carvings, and 17th-century Belgian Choir stalls. It is richly furnished. Frank Leslie's Weekly issued a whole booklet on the cathedral for tourists of the late 19th century. In 2008, the Ship of Fools website gave the cathedral a rating of "10" (its highest) for its architecture, preaching, and Anglo-Catholic worship services.

The Cathedral hosts an annual Art in Bloom festival.

== Music ==
The cathedral is famous for its music program, and is affiliated with the American Guild of Organists and the Royal School of Church Music in America. As an Anglo-catholic or High Church house of worship, it makes use of music, choir, and "bells and smells" as important parts of the liturgy.

In the late 19th century, Bishop Doane created a boy's choir school (now defunct) and the Cathedral Choir of Men and Boys. Doane penned "Ancient of Days", which has become a well-known Anglican hymn, also known by its tune, Albany, while at the Cathedral of All Saints. The Choir sings in a wide variety of languages, including Greek (the Kyrie), "English, Latin, German, French, Italian, and Russian."

The Boys Choir at the Cathedral of All Saints sings compline periodically, usually the first Friday of each month, which is timed to coordinate with other activities downtown. They also sing the service of Nine Lessons and Carols every Advent season.

The cathedral is also a concert venue for both secular and religious music. This is due in no small part to its architecture, and has been cited as one of the "Great Acoustic Spaces for Choral Music (in the) U.S. and Canada." The cathedral's pipe organ is a 1956 Aeolian-Skinner model designed by G. Donald Harrison, subsequently modified by Austin Organs.

== Other programs ==
One of the practices revived in the Cathedral since Bishop Doane's time, has been the election and crowning of a boy bishop in conjunction with its Medieval Faire, an event which is presently on hiatus. It was a widespread practice in Europe and especially in England for nearly 300 years prior to the Reformation, associated with festivals related to St. Nicholas.

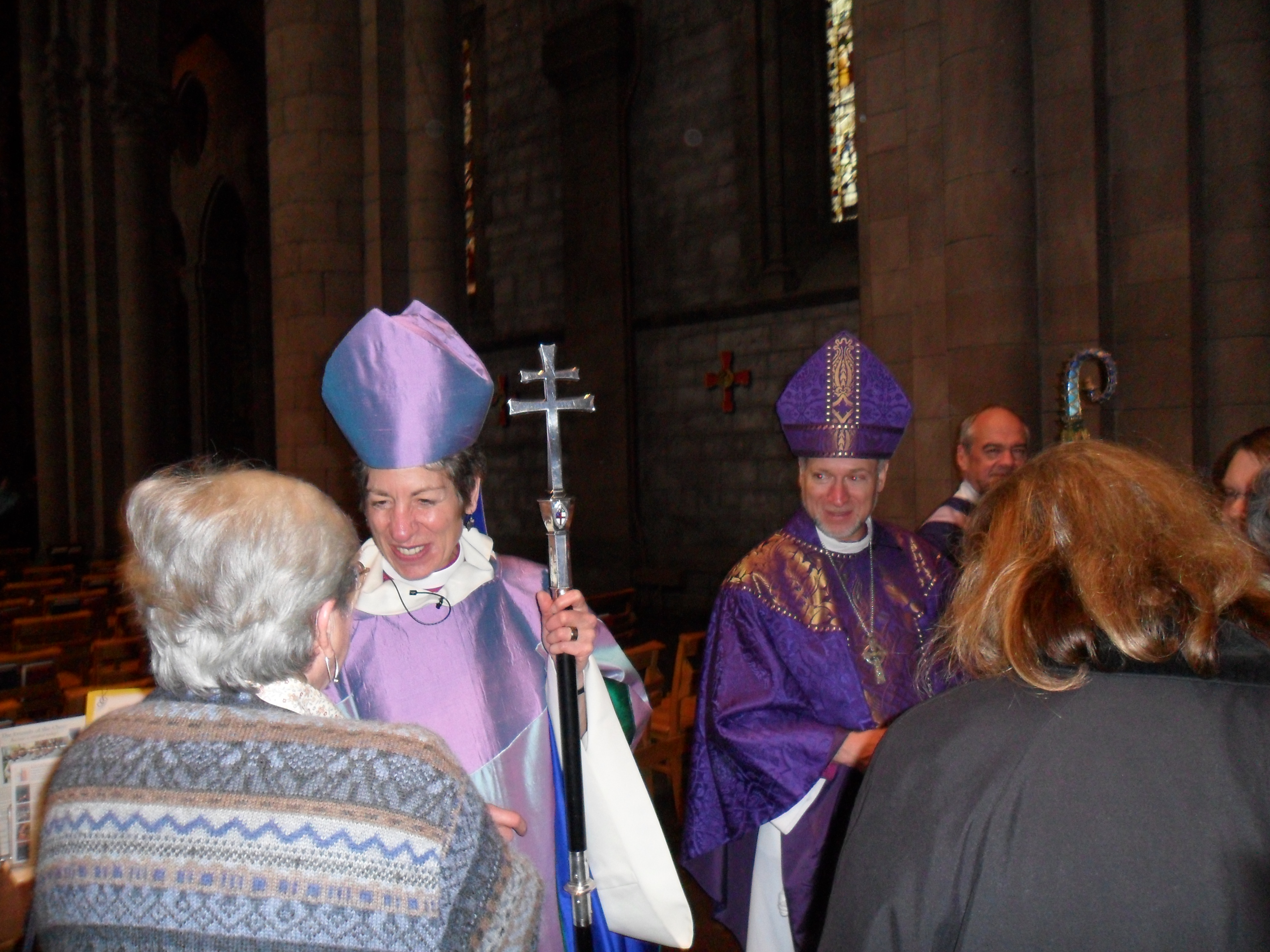
Presiding Bishop Katharine Jefferts Schori and Bishop Bill Love of Albany at the Cathedral of All Saints in 2011.

The synod of Province II took place May 7–8, 2009 in Albany, New York, near the cathedral, at the Crowne Plaza Hotel. Presiding Bishop Katharine Jefferts Schori celebrated eucharist at the Cathedral of All Saints when she visited the Episcopal Diocese of Albany in 2011.

== Notable Cathedralites ==
Amongst the notable congregants, or "Cathedralites", besides its bishops, have been:

- Grover Cleveland
- Erastus Corning 2nd
- Martha S. Lewis
- John Pierpont Morgan
- Eleanor Roosevelt
- Franklin Delano Roosevelt
- Theodore Roosevelt

== Gallery of memorials ==
The cathedral has a number of memorials, some of which are shown below.

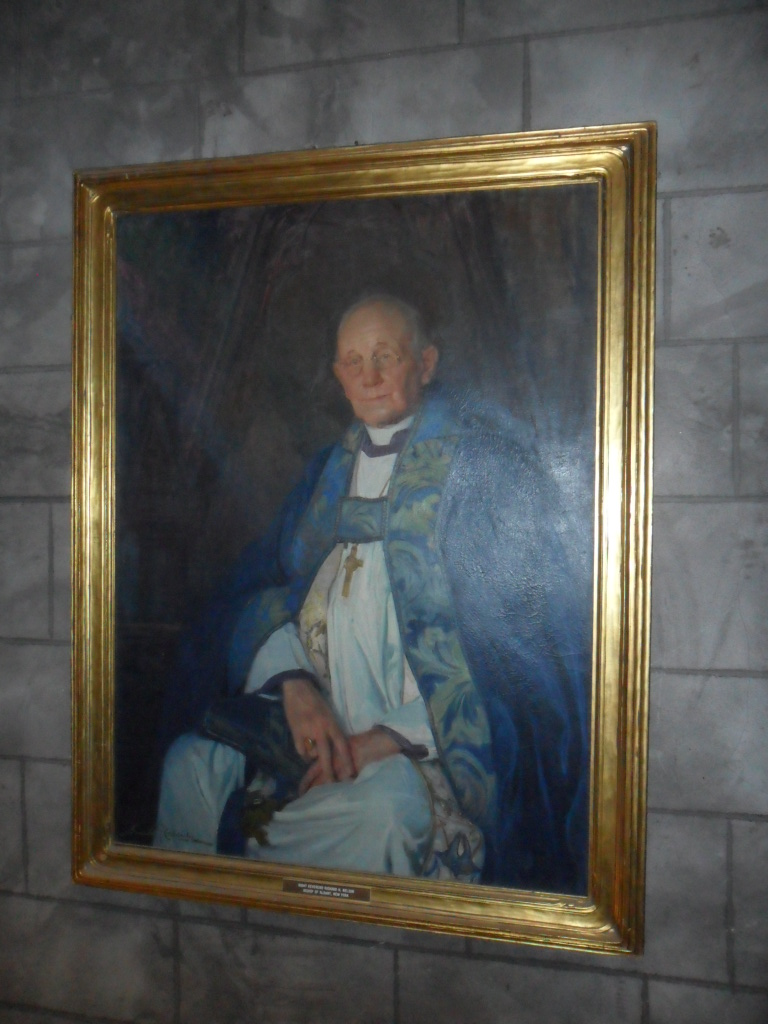
Richard H. Nelson, painting, baptistry.

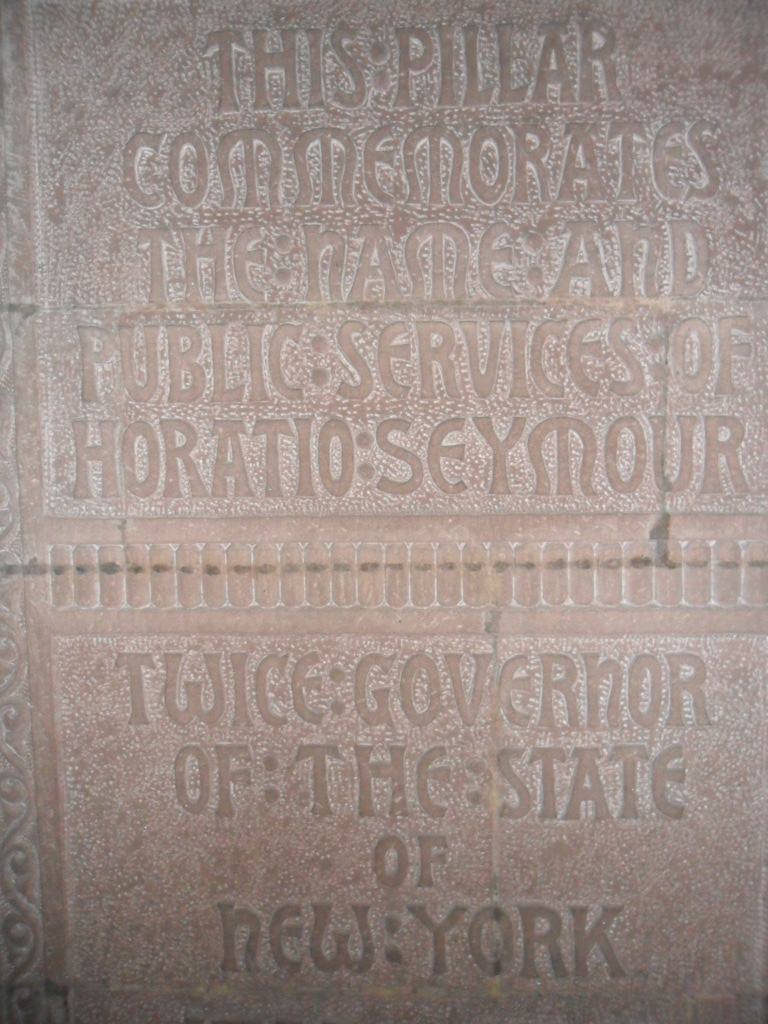
Horatio Seymour memorial, nave.

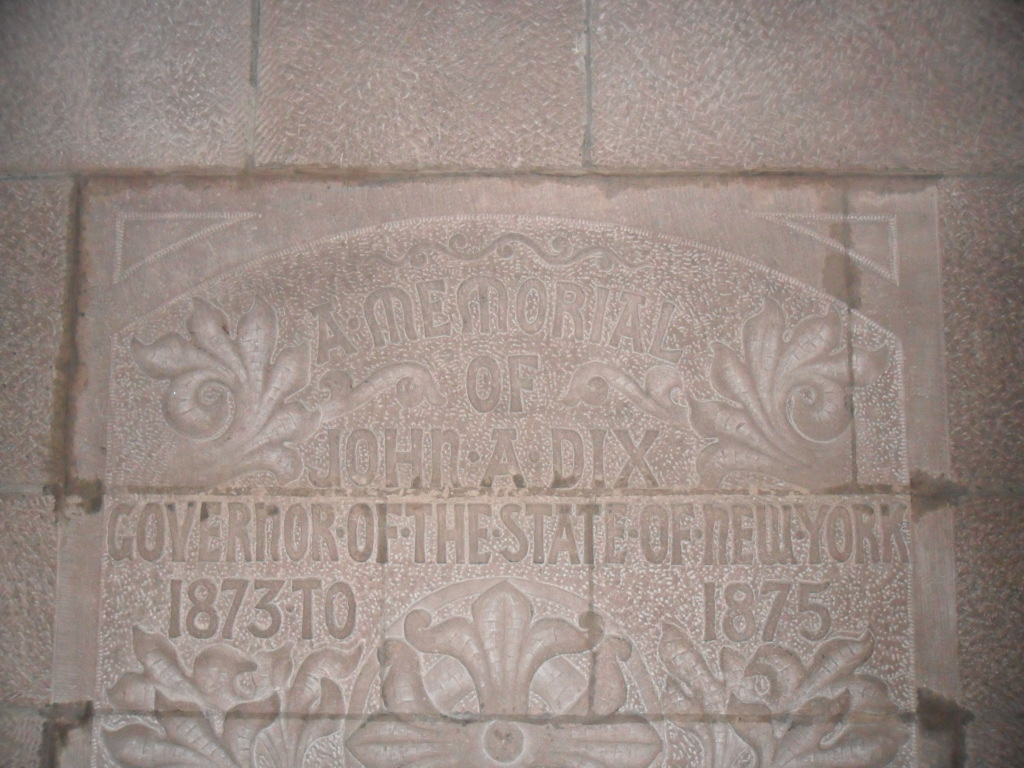
John Adams Dix memorial, nave.

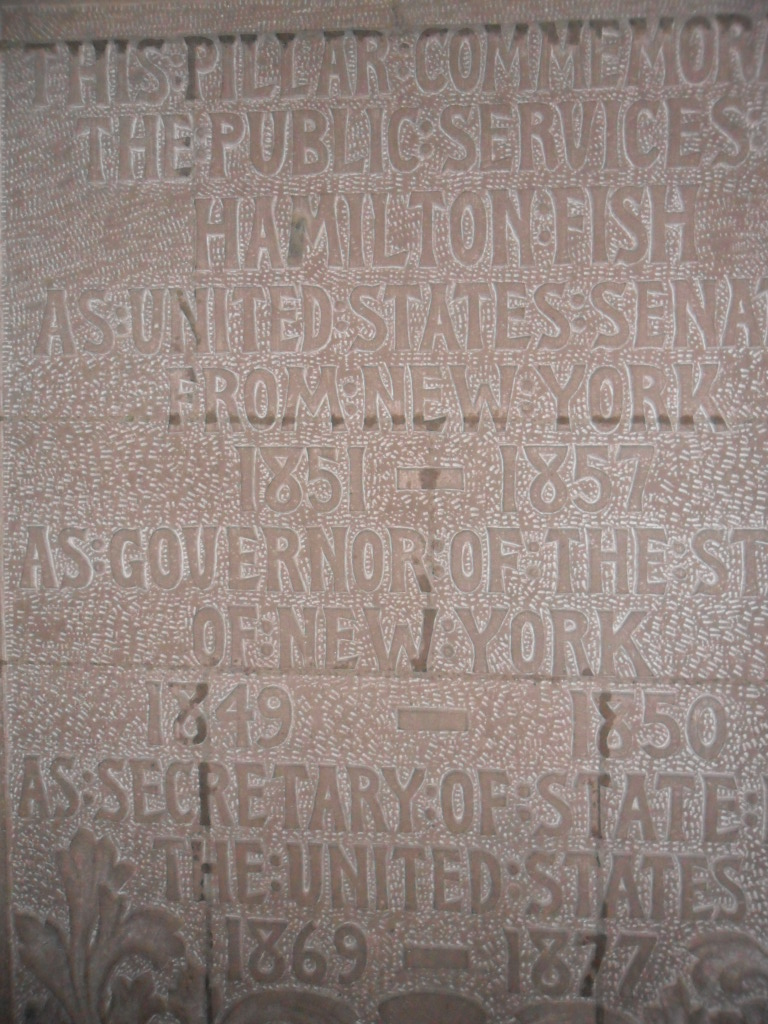
Hamilton Fish memorial, nave.

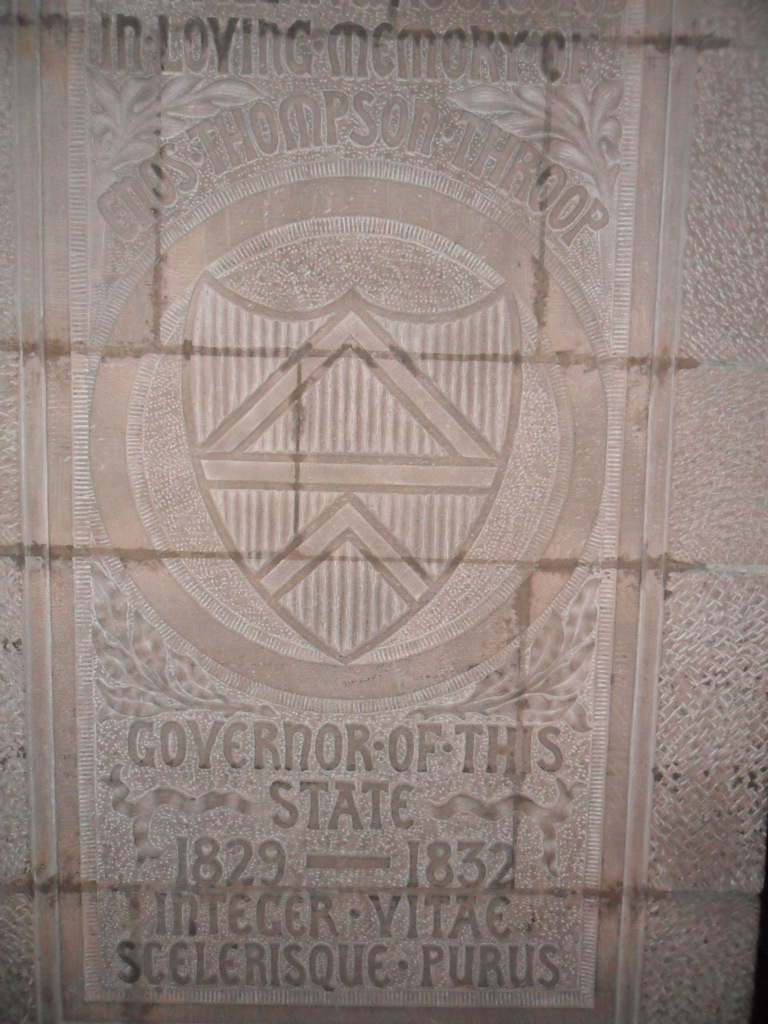
Enos T. Throop memorial, nave.

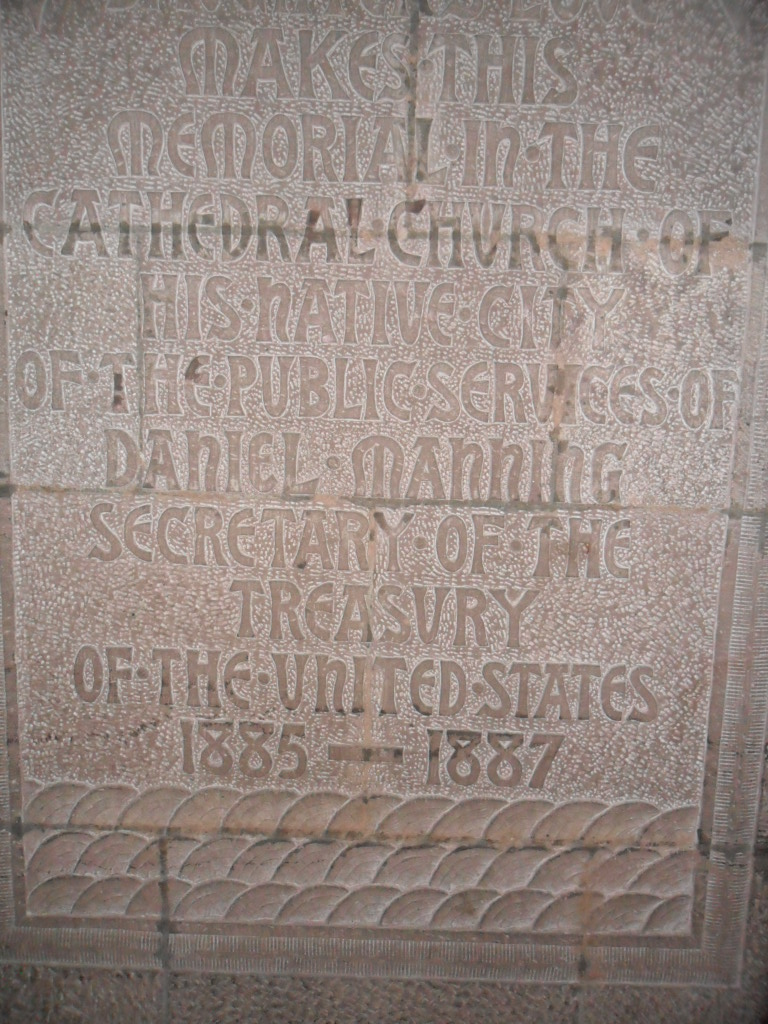
Daniel Manning memorial, nave.

== See also ==
- List of the Episcopal cathedrals of the United States
- List of cathedrals in the United States
- National Register of Historic Places listings in Albany, New York
