= Province of the Episcopal Church of Sudan =

Anglican ecclesiastical province

- Classification: Protestant
- Orientation: Anglican
- Scripture: Holy Bible
- Theology: Anglican doctrine
- Polity: Episcopal
- Primate: Ezekiel Kondo
- Headquarters: Khartoum, Sudan
- Territory: Sudan
- Members: 1.1 million

The Province of the Episcopal Church of Sudan is a province of the Anglican Communion, comprising the Sudan. It is the 39th Anglican province, created in a ceremony that took place in All Saints Cathedral, Khartoum, on 30 July 2017. The first archbishop and primate is Ezekiel Kondo.

== History ==
The entire country of Sudan comprised the Province of the Episcopal Church of Sudan, created in 1976. After the secession of South Sudan, in 2011, it was decided to create an internal (or metropolitical) province comprising the dioceses of Sudan, but to maintain the overall unity of the church across Sudan and South Sudan, at the General Synod, in November 2013. The Internal Province of the Episcopal Church of Sudan was created, comprising the 5 dioceses situated in Northern Sudan. Ezekiel Kondo, the Bishop of Khartoum, was elected the first archbishop on 4 April 2014.

Many in Sudan believed that this internal province should be given full autonomy as a new Anglican province, with the expectation that the metropolitan archbishop would become archbishop and primate. In 2016 a formal application was made to the Anglican Consultative Council (ACC) for the internal province of Sudan to be granted autonomy. In July 2016 a team led by the archbishop of Adelaide and the vice chairman of the ACC carried out a fact-finding mission in northern Sudan. This team reported back to the ACC to enable a formal response to the application for autonomy. In March 2017 it was announced that the ACC had decided that the internal province of Sudan would become the 39th province of the Anglican Communion, with Ezekiel Kondo, Archbishop of Khartoum, as the first archbishop and primate. The constitution of the new province took place on 30 July 2017, in the presence of the Archbishop of Canterbury, Justin Welby.

In February 2024, due to significant growth in the Diocese of Kadugli & Nuba Mountains, Archbishop Kondo consecrated Bishop Elsir Hassan Kuku to be the diocesan bishop of the newest Diocese of Heiban, now the sixth diocese of the Episcopal Church of Sudan. The new diocese covers the central part of the Nuba Mountains around Heiban and Kauda.

== Membership ==
There are approximately 1,000,000 Anglicans in Sudan.

== Archbishops ==
- Ezekiel Kondo, 2017–present

== Dioceses ==
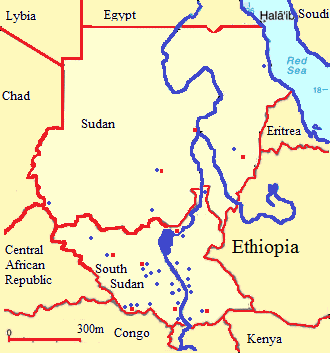
Map of the Catholic (red) and Anglican (blue) bishoprics in Sudan and South Sudan, 2017.

- El Obeid
- Kadugli and Nuba Mountains
- Heiban
- Khartoum
- Port Sudan
- Wad Medani

== Anglican realignment ==
The new province is associated to the Global South and the Global Anglican Future Conference. Ezekiel Kondo, then archbishop of the Internal Province of Sudan, was one of the eight Anglican archbishops that attended Foley Beach enthronement as archbishop and primate of the Anglican Church in North America, on 9 October 2014, at the Church of the Apostles, in Atlanta, United States.

The province was not able to send representatives to GAFCON III, held in Jerusalem between 17 and 22 June 2018, due to the fact that Sudan did not allow its citizens to travel to Israel.
