= David E. Richards =

American Episcopal bishop (1921–2018)

The Right Reverend David Emrys Richards
- Bishop of Costa Rica; Bishop in Charge of Nicaragua and Honduras
- Church: Episcopal Church
- Diocese: Costa Rica
- Elected: 1967
- In office: 1967–1968
- Previous posts: Suffragan Bishop of Albany (1951–1957); Bishop of Central America (1957–1967)

Orders
- Ordination: October 1945 by Reginald Heber Gooden
- Consecration: July 19, 1951 by Henry Knox Sherrill

Personal details
- Born: January 23, 1921 Scranton, Pennsylvania, United States
- Died: August 21, 2018 (aged 97) Coral Gables, Florida, United States
- Denomination: Anglican
- Parents: Emrys Richards & Ida May Williams
- Spouse: Helen Rice
- Children: 4

David Emrys Richards (January 23, 1921 – August 21, 2018) was an American prelate of the Episcopal Church who served as the Suffragan Bishop of Albany and then as bishop to multiple missionary districts in Central America.

== Early life and education ==
Richards was born on January 23, 1921, in Scranton, Pennsylvania, son of Emrys Richards and Ida May Williams. He was educated at Lehigh University from where he graduated with a Bachelor of Arts in 1942. He then studied at the General Theological Seminary and graduated with a Bachelor of Sacred Theology in 1945. In 1952, he was awarded a Doctor of Sacred Theology from General.

== Ordained ministry ==
Richards was ordained deacon on April 7, 1945, at St Luke's Church in Scranton, Pennsylvania, by Bishop Frank W. Sterrett of Bethlehem. On July 6, 1945, he was transferred to the Missionary District of Canal Zone and was ordained priest there in October of the same year by Bishop Reginald Heber Gooden of Central America and Panama. During this time he served as priest-in-charge of the Church of St Mary the Virgin in Cristóbal, Colón, in present-day Panama. In 1948, he returned to the United States and became assistant at St George's Church in Schenectady, New York.

== Bishop ==
In 1951, Richards was elected Suffragan Bishop of Albany and was consecrated on July 19, 1951, by Presiding Bishop Henry Knox Sherrill. He remained in Albany until 1957, when that September he was elected as Bishop of the Missionary District of Central America. In 1967 he was elected Bishop of Costa Rica, and Bishop in Charge of Nicaragua and Honduras, posts he retained till 1968. From 1968 till 1988 he served as director of the Office of Pastoral Development.

== Family ==
Richards was married to Helen Rice and together had three sons and one daughter.
