= Walter M. Higley =

American bishop

The Right Reverend Walter M. Higley S.T.D.
- Bishop of Central New York
- Church: Episcopal Church
- Diocese: Central New York
- In office: 1960–1969
- Predecessor: Malcolm E. Peabody
- Successor: Ned Cole
- Previous posts: Suffragan Bishop of Central New York (1948-1959); Coadjutor Bishop of Central New York (1959-1960)

Orders
- Ordination: November 30, 1925 by Charles Fiske
- Consecration: December 15, 1948 by Henry Knox Sherrill

Personal details
- Born: January 23, 1899 Norwich, New York, United States
- Died: May 4, 1969 (aged 70) Syracuse, New York, United States
- Buried: Mount Hope Cemetery, Norwich, New York
- Denomination: Anglican
- Parents: Homer Harvey Higley & Cornelia Merritt Martin
- Spouse: Marion Carr Mason
- Children: 4

Walter Maydole Higley (January 23, 1899 - May 4, 1969) was bishop of the Episcopal Diocese of Central New York, serving from 1960 to 1969.

== Early life and education ==
Higley was born on January 23, 1899, in Norwich, New York, the son of Homer Harvey Higley and Cornelia Merritt Martin. He studied at the Phillips Andover Academy between 1916 and 1918 and graduated with a Bachelor of Science from Columbia University in 1922. In 1925 he graduated with a Bachelor of Theology from General Theological Seminary. He was awarded a Doctor of Sacred Theology by General in 1949 and another by Syracuse University in 1964. Hobart College awarded him a Doctor of Divinity in 1962. Peabody retired in 1960.

== Ordained ministry ==
Higley was made deacon by Bishop Edward H. Coley and ordained to the priesthood by Bishop Charles Fiske in 1925. He served as missionary-in-charge of Emmanuel Church in Memphis, Tennessee between 1925 and 1929 after becoming rector of All Saints Church in Johnson City, New York. In 1943 he was appointed Archdeacon of Central New York and deputy to the General Conventions of 1943 and 1946. In 1944 he also became chairman of the diocesan department of missions.

== Episcopate ==
On September 15, 1948, Higley was elected Suffragan Bishop of Central New York during a reconvened session of the 80th diocesan convention which took place in Trinity Church in Syracuse, New York. He was consecrated on December 15, 1948, in St Paul's Church by Presiding Bishop Henry Knox Sherrill. On May 8, 1959, he was elected on the 11th ballot as the Coadjutor Bishop of Central New York. Peabody retired in 1960.He succeeded Bishop Peabody as Bishop of Central New York on June 11, 1960. He retained his post till 1969. He died a few months later on May 11.
