= David B. Joslin =

Bishop of the Episcopal Diocese of Central New York

The Right Reverend David Bruce Joslin D.D.
- Bishop of Central New York
- Church: Episcopal Church
- Diocese: Central New York
- Elected: June 8, 1991
- In office: 1992–2000
- Predecessor: O'Kelley Whitaker
- Successor: Gladstone B. Adams III
- Other post: Assisting Bishop of New Jersey (2000–2003)
- Previous post: Coadjutor Bishop of Central New York (1991-1992)

Orders
- Ordination: 1965 by Alfred L. Banyard
- Consecration: November 1991 by Edmond L. Browning

Personal details
- Born: January 8, 1936 Collingswood, New Jersey, United States
- Died: October 25, 2023 Westerly, Rhode Island, United States
- Denomination: Anglican (prev. Methodist)
- Parents: Sheppard Joslin and Elizabeth Andrews
- Spouse: Kathrine E. Brockett (m. June 15, 1958); Missy Bennett (m. 2017)
- Children: 2

David Bruce Joslin (January 8, 1936 - October 25, 2023) was bishop of the Episcopal Diocese of Central New York from 1992 to 2000.

== Biography ==
Joslin was born in Collingswood, New Jersey, son of a Methodist minister and his wife, and raised in Linwood, New Jersey. He graduated with a Bachelor of Arts from Drew University in 1958 and then a Master of Divinity from the same university in 1961. He became an Associate in Anglican Studies at the Episcopal Divinity School in 1963, after joining the Episcopal Church. In 1965, Joslin was ordained a transitional deacon and, later that year, a priest in the Episcopal Church.

Joslin served as associate rector of St Paul's Church in Montvale, New Jersey from 1965 to 1967, after becoming rector of St David's Church in Wilmington, Delaware. In 1974, he became rector of Christ Church in Westerly, Rhode Island, and in 1987, rector of the Church of St Stephen the Martyr in Edina, Minnesota, where he remained until 1991.

In 1980, he published a book about the episcopacy.

On June 8, 1991, at the age of 55, he was elected Bishop Coadjutor of the Diocese of Central New York at their annual convention. He succeeded the Rt. Rev. O'Kelley Whitaker, who was set to retire at the beginning of 1992. He was elected on the third ballot. His consecration was in November 1991 at St. Paul's Cathedral, Syracuse.

At the time he was bishop, the Diocese of Central New York comprised "an 1,800-square-mile area [with] 40,000 members in its 106 parishes. He served as bishop from 1992 to 1999.

Almost immediately upon his consecration, Joslin had to accept the resignation of a high-ranking priest after a sex scandal in October 1992, which made national news; the priest, married to a woman, had engaged in affairs with young men.

In 2000, he was appointed "Provisional Bishop" by Presiding Bishop Frank Griswold "to assist dioceses in transition from one bishop to another .... in the Dioceses of New Jersey and Long Island." In New Jersey, he assisted with confirmations. He led in the Diocese of Long Island in between when Bishop Orris Walker Jr. left and Lawrence Provenzano took over, between June and November 2009. As an "assisting bishop", Joslin was a consecrator of Provenzano in 2009.

In 2004, Joslin retired and returned to Westerly, to serve as an Assisting Bishop, and later, Bishop-in-residence. In 2012, he served as interim dean of the Cathedral of Saint John, during a period when it had to suspend services due to lack of operating funds. When that cathedral held its last religious services in April 2012, Joslin was quoted as saying, "We tried to make it upbeat, with the music and so forth. And it was during the Easter season." He was awarded a Doctor of Divinity from Berkeley Divinity School in 2017.

== Personal life and Death ==
Joslin was first married to Kathrine (sic.) who died after a long illness. He married, secondly, in 2017 to Missy Bennett, "whom he had known for many years through her church work." He died on October 25, 2023, at his home in Westerly, Rhode Island.
