= 1964 Textile 250 =

Auto race held at Concord Speedway in 1964

Race details
- Race 1 of 62 in the 1964 NASCAR Grand National Series season
- 1964 Textile 250 program cover
- Date: November 10, 1963; 61 years ago
- Official name: Textile 250
- Location: Concord Speedway, Concord, North Carolina
- Course: Permanent racing facility
- Course length: 0.500 miles (0.805 km)
- Distance: 250 laps, 125.0 mi (201.1 km)
- Weather: Temperatures reaching of 72 °F (22 °C); wind speeds of 7 miles per hour (11 km/h)
- Average speed: 56.897 miles per hour (91.567 km/h)

Pole position
| Driver | David Pearson | Owens Racing |

Most laps led
| Driver | Ned Jarrett | Burton-Robinson |
- Laps: 114

Winner
| No. 11 | Ned Jarrett | Burton-Robinson |

Television in the United States
- Network: untelevised
- Announcers: none

The 1964 Textile 250 was a NASCAR Grand National Series event that was held on November 10, 1963, at Concord Speedway in Concord, North Carolina.

250 laps were done on a dirt track spanning 125 miles (201 km) in total distance. Despite being held during the 1963 calendar year, this race was considered to be the first race in the 1964 Grand National season. The silly season between the 1963 and 1964 seasons was only seven days unlike the twelve weeks that the drivers enjoy today.

== Qualifying ==
| Grid | No. | Driver | Manufacturer | Owner |
|---|---|---|---|---|
| 1 | 5 | David Pearson | '63 Dodge | Cotton Owens |
| 2 | 3 | Junior Johnson | '63 Chevrolet | Ray Fox |
| 3 | 11 | Ned Jarrett | '63 Ford | Charles Robinson |
| 4 | 42 | Richard Petty | '63 Plymouth | Petty Enterprises |
| 5 | 48 | Jack Smith | '63 Plymouth | Jack Smith |
| 6 | 8 | Joe Weatherly | '63 Pontiac | Bud Moore |
| 7 | 32 | Tiny Lund | '63 Ford | Dave Kent |
| 8 | 6 | Billy Wade | '63 Dodge | Cotton Owens |
| 9 | 75 | G.C. Spencer | '62 Pontiac | Paul Clayton |
| 10 | 14 | Darel Dieringer | '63 Ford | Pete Stewart |
| 11 | 96 | Jimmy Massey | '62 Chevrolet | Hubert Westmoreland |
| 12 | 41 | Maurice Petty | '63 Plymouth | Petty Enterprises |
| 13 | 67 | Jimmy Pardue | '62 Pontiac | unknown |
| 14 | 09 | Larry Manning | '62 Chevrolet | Bob Adams |
| 15 | 23 | Bill Widenhouse | '62 Plymouth | Leland Colvin |
| 16 | 20 | Jack Anderson | '63 Ford | Jack Anderson |
| 17 | 83 | Worth McMillion | '62 Pontiac | Worth McMillion |
| 18 | 16 | Larry Thomas | '62 Dodge | Wade Yonts |
| 19 | 34 | Wendell Scott | '62 Chevrolet | Wendell Scott |
| 20 | 02 | Doug Cooper | '62 Pontiac | Bob Cooper |
| 21 | 87 | Buck Baker | '63 Pontiac | Buck Baker |
| 22 | 62 | Curtis Crider | '63 Mercury | Curtis Crider |
| 23 | 9 | Roy Tyner | '62 Chevrolet | Roy Tyner |
| 24 | 18 | Toy Bolton | '61 Pontiac | Toy Bolton |
| 25 | 86 | Neil Castles | '62 Chrysler | Buck Baker |
| 26 | 68 | Ed Livingston | '61 Ford | Ed Livingston |

== Race report ==
After 2 hours, 11 minutes, and 49 seconds of intense racing action, a winner was decided. Ned Jarrett (Dale Jarrett's father) defeated his opponent Joe Weatherly by twelve seconds. Speeds were relatively slow by today's standards; the average speed was 56.897 miles (91.567 km) per hour while the pole position speed was 69.257 miles (111.458 km) per hour. Petty Enterprises was called "Petty Engineering Co." during the early-1960s and the car owner for the No. 41, 42, and 43 cars during the 1964 season was Lee Petty. A balanced combination of corporate multi-car teams and individual owners were recorded on the race log for this event. Despite the word International being added to the race track; there were no foreign competitors to this race.

The typical American passenger vehicle of the 21st century can legally drive up to 90 miles (140 km) on some rural roads. This would make today's passenger vehicles faster than the stock cars of this era (which were supposed to represent advancements in automobile technology). However, many safety features adopted in these early stock cars would be used in passenger vehicles that were made years and even decades later. The transition to purpose-built racecars began in the early 1960s and occurred gradually over that decade. Changes made to the sport by the late 1960s brought an end to the "strictly stock" vehicles of the 1950s.

While the race was underway, the track came apart and certain parts of the track were covered with dust. Notable racers that didn't finish in the top ten included: Buck Baker, Bill Widenhouse, Roy Tyner, Wendell Scott, Junior Johnson, Neil Castles and Jimmy Massey. Toy Bolton would make his NASCAR Cup Series debut in this race. While this would be his only race of the 1964 season, he would return for the 1966 season. Three thousand people attended this live racing event as of the start of the race. Due to the low-level interest of the sport outside the North Carolina region during this era, the event was completely untelevised. The fastest finishing positions for each manufacturer were: Ford (1st), Pontiac (2nd), Plymouth (3rd), Dodge (4th), Chevrolet (8th), Mercury (9th), and Chrysler (24th).

This would be Hubert Westmoreland's last race as a car owner and the first Southern 500 winning owner went out before his driver Jimmy Massey could complete a lap. Massey would have his final race as a NASCAR Grand National Series driver at this event.

Scoring was done for the 1964 NASCAR Grand National Series using a "base" number, that is the 25th position was the base since anyone finishing lower than 25th received the same number of points as 25th position. By the conclusion of the 1964 NASCAR Grand National Series season, a total of 16 different points schemes were used.

Ned Jarrett walked away from the event with the winner's purse of $1,350 ($13,687 when adjusted for inflation). John Ervin was the winning crew chief for this racing event; he would go on to win 28 races during the 1964 and 1965 NASCAR Cup Series seasons. Other notable crew chiefs in the race were Jimmy Helms, Frank McMillion, Dale Inman, Wendell Scott, Ralph Gray, Skip Adams, and Bob Cooper.

The last finisher to get a monetary award was Darel Dieringer who received $50 ($507 when adjusted for inflation) for finishing in 22nd place (out of twenty-six competitors). After combining all the prize winnings for the drivers, the total winnings purse for this race was $6,010 ($60,932 when adjusted for inflation).

=== Timeline ===
Section reference:

- Start of race: David Pearson started the race with the pole position; Jimmy Massey had the leave the race due to a terminal crash.
- Lap 13: Ed Livingston overheated his vehicle, ending his day on the track.
- Lap 27: Neil Castles' vehicle had a problematic engine, forcing him out of the race.
- Lap 40: Ned Jarrett takes over the lead from David Pearson.
- Lap 48: Toy Bolton saw his vehicle's rear end become unusable, causing him to leave the race early.
- Lap 109: Junior Johnson overheated his vehicle, forcing him to retire from the race.
- Lap 111: The rear end of Jimmy Pardue's vehicle became unusable.
- Lap 134: Joe Weatherly takes over the lead from Ned Jarrett.
- Lap 136: Richard Petty takes over the lead from Joe Weatherly.
- Lap 149: Joe Weatherly takes over the lead from Richard Petty.
- Lap 153: Bill Widenhose's vehicle had a problematic engine, making him exit the race prematurely.
- Lap 185: Problems with Billy Wade's oil pressure caused him to exit the race before it finished.
- Lap 205: Fuel tank problems would sink Buck Baker's chances of finishing the event.
- Lap 231: Ned Jarrett takes over the lead from Joe Weatherly, Weatherly would never lead a NASCAR Cup Series race after the conclusion of this event.
- Finish: Ned Jarrett was officially declared the winner of the event.

== Finishing order ==
Section reference:

| POS | ST | # | DRIVER | SPONSOR / OWNER | CAR | LAPS | MONEY | STATUS | LED |
|---|---|---|---|---|---|---|---|---|---|
| 1 | 3 | 11 | Ned Jarrett | Burton-Robinson (Charles Robinson) | '63 Ford | 250 | 1350 | running | 114 |
| 2 | 6 | 8 | Joe Weatherly | Bud Moore | '63 Pontiac | 250 | 1000 | running | 84 |
| 3 | 4 | 42 | Richard Petty | Petty Enterprises | '63 Plymouth | 248 | 650 | running | 13 |
| 4 | 1 | 5 | David Pearson | Cotton Owens | '63 Dodge | 241 | 500 | running | 39 |
| 5 | 12 | 41 | Maurice Petty | Petty Enterprises | '63 Plymouth | 241 | 400 | running | 0 |
| 6 | 16 | 20 | Jack Anderson | Jack Anderson | '63 Ford | 233 | 300 | running | 0 |
| 7 | 18 | 16 | Larry Thomas | Wade Younts | '62 Dodge | 230 | 250 | running | 0 |
| 8 | 14 | 09 | Larry Manning | Bob Adams | '62 Chevrolet | 229 | 200 | running | 0 |
| 9 | 22 | 62 | Curtis Crider | Curtis Crider | '63 Mercury | 221 | 165 | running | 0 |
| 10 | 7 | 32 | Tiny Lund | Dave Kent | '63 Ford | 215 | 150 | running | 0 |
| 11 | 20 | 02 | Doug Cooper | Bob Cooper | '62 Pontiac | 213 | 140 | running | 0 |
| 12 | 21 | 87 | Buck Baker | Buck Baker | '63 Pontiac | 205 | 130 | fuel tank | 0 |
| 13 | 23 | 9 | Roy Tyner | Roy Tyner | '62 Chevrolet | 201 | 120 | running | 0 |
| 14 | 17 | 83 | Worth McMillion | Worth McMillion | '62 Pontiac | 194 | 110 | running | 0 |
| 15 | 8 | 6 | Billy Wade | Cotton Owens | '63 Dodge | 185 | 100 | oil pressure | 0 |
| 16 | 15 | 23 | Bill Widenhouse | Leland Colvin | '62 Plymouth | 153 | 90 | engine | 0 |
| 17 | 19 | 34 | Wendell Scott | Wendell Scott | '62 Chevrolet | 134 | 80 | crash | 0 |
| 18 | 13 | 67 | Jimmy Pardue | | '62 Pontiac | 111 | 70 | rear end | 0 |
| 19 | 2 | 3 | Junior Johnson | Holly Farms (Ray Fox) | '63 Chevrolet | 109 | 55 | overheating | 0 |
| 20 | 9 | 75 | G.C. Spencer | Paul Clayton | '62 Pontiac | 95 | 50 | rear end | 0 |
| 21 | 5 | 48 | Jack Smith | Jack Smith | '63 Plymouth | 57 | 50 | a frame | 0 |
| 22 | 10 | 14 | Darel Dieringer | Pete Stewart | '63 Ford | 57 | 50 | transmission | 0 |
| 23 | 24 | 18 | Toy Bolton | Toy Bolton | '61 Pontiac | 48 | | rear end | 0 |
| 24 | 25 | 86 | Neil Castles | Buck Baker | '62 Chrysler | 27 | | engine | 0 |
| 25 | 26 | 68 | Ed Livingston | Ed Livingston | '61 Ford | 13 | | overheating | 0 |
| 26 | 11 | 96 | Jimmy Massey | Hubert Westmoreland | '62 Chevrolet | 0 | | crash | 0 |

* Driver failed to finish race

| Preceded by 1963 Golden State 400 | NASCAR Grand National Races; 1963-64 | Succeeded by 1964 untitled race at Augusta International Raceway |
