= Church Association for the Advancement of the Interests of Labor =

American religious-political organization

Church Association for the Advancement of the Interests of Labor, commonly known as "CAIL", was an American Social Gospel organization founded in 1887, in New York City. It was organized by nine clergymen of the Protestant Episcopal Church. under the aegis of Bishop F. D. Huntington. From the beginning, CAIL recognized organized labor. Its declaration of principles stated that "God is the Father of all men and all men are brothers. . . . It is the duty of every man to labor diligently. . . . Labor should be the standard of social worth. When the divinely intended opportunity to labor is given to all men, one great cause of the present wide-spread suffering and destitution will be removed." The Association's official organ, Hammer and Pen, was for a long time the only church labor paper in the United States. CAIL also took an active interest in looking after the relations between the Church and the stage. The Association was one of the pioneer agencies in introducing arbitration of industrial disputes in this country and actively combated the sweat-shop system, notably in New York.

== Establishment ==
In his pastoral letter of May 15, 1886, the Right Reverend Henry C. Potter, Bishop of the Episcopal Diocese of New York, addressed his clergymen in no uncertain terms upon the question of Labor. Inspired by Potter's burning words, a number of Episcopal ministers met at the clergy house of the Order of the Holy Cross, New York City, on May 18, 1887, in response to an invitation given by the Rev. James O. S. Huntington, O. H. C., with the intention of the clergy of this branch of the Church be moved to perform their duty to the workingmen of the U.S. The meeting was called to order by Father Huntington, who addressed the gathering on the labor question and the interest that both the ministry and the laity should take in it, declaring that the time had come when the clergy should act through definite organization and place themselves in active sympathy with the working people. The Rev. Benjamin F. De Costa was elected chairman and the Rev. Edward Kenney secretary. A plan of organization was submitted by the Rev. W. D. P. Bliss, and it was decided to institute a guild within the Church. At a subsequent meeting, the new organization was named the Church Association for the Advancement of the Interests of Labor, which was better known by the shorter title of CAIL.

At a public meeting on June 22, 1887, as a basis of work for the society, it was enacted "that the clergy and laity of the Church should become personally interested in the social questions now being agitated, should inform themselves of the nature of the issues presented, and should be prepared to act as the necessities of the day may demand;" while its methods were declared to be: "(1) Sermons setting forth the teachings of the Gospel as the guide to the solution of every question involved in the interests of Labor. (2) The proper use of the press and the circulation of tracts as occasion may require. (3) Lectures and addresses on occasions when the interests of Labor may be advanced. (4) The encouragement by precept and example of a conscientious use of the ballot."

== History ==
It was felt that the Church should take active measures to show her sympathy with the laboring classes in their struggle for justice, and CAIL grew out of a desire to carry this sympathy into effect. Its object was "the advancement of the interests of labor by the application of the principles of the Gospel of Jesus Christ". The Rt. Rev. Frederic Dan Huntington, Bishop of Episcopal Diocese of Central New York, was elected as its first president.

The Association worked by sermons, prayer, corporate communion, lectures, distribution of literature, political action, and cooperation with other societies. It was confined in membership to communicants of the Protestant Episcopal Church or churches in communion with it, and had among its members 38 bishops of the American Church and four bishops of the Canadian Church. In New York City, it was very active in working for the passage of industrial legislation, in holding meetings in Episcopal churches where representatives of the working classes were invited to state their wrongs and desires, while representatives of the employees' interests were also heard.

For a few years, ending in 1907, the Christian Social Union was affiliated with CAIL.

== Committees and councils ==
When in 1893 the society created its Council of Mediation and Arbitration, it selected John Newton Bogart, a member of "Big Six," as the Labor attaché of the board, the other two members being Bishop Potter and Hon. Seth Low. In 1894, when the committee was enlarged to fifteen members so as to include representatives of the public, Capital and the labor unions, Bogart was chosen secretary, in which capacity he served for several years. The title was afterward changed to the New York Council of Mediation and Conciliation, whose constitution forbade it to "constitute itself a body of arbitrators excepting at the express request of both parties to a controversy, to be signified in writing." It was one of the first organizations of the country to spread the idea of arbitration between labor and capital and has done much to create more intimate knowledge and a better feeling between the church and labor.

The association had standing committees on organized labor, investigation of strikes and promotion of peace, sweat shops, carrying on an aggressive work against sweating, tenement houses, looking to the reform of abuses, and church and stage, in co-operation with the Actors' Church Alliance, which was founded by this society.

== Officers and members ==
More than sixty bishops of the Protestant Episcopal Church were honorary vice-presidents, whose efforts for the betterment of the industrial interests of all sorts and conditions of people in the promotion of conciliation between capital and labor were of worldwide influence. Communicants of this church were eligible for membership, and others willing to work with the society could become associate members. It was made the duty of each member to take, or read at least one journal published in the interest of Labor, and to devote a certain portion of his time to the social questions of the day.

Its secretary and co-organizer was Harriette A. Keyser, who was located at the Church Mission House, 281 Fourth Avenue, New York.

== Principles ==
Its five principles were as follows:

1. It is of the essence of the teachings of Jesus Christ that God is the Father of all men, and that all men are brothers.
2. God is the sole possessor of the earth and its fulness; man is but the steward of God's bounties.
3. Labor being the exercise of body, mind, and spirit in the broadening and elevating of human life, it is the duty of every man to labor diligently.
4. Labor, as thus defined, should be the standard of social worth.
5. When the divinely intended opportunity to labor is given to all men, one great cause of the present widespread suffering and destitution will be removed.

== Publications and documents ==
The society had an official organ, Hammer and Pen, published monthly. It was the only church labor paper in the United States.

CAIL's papers from 1887 to 1921 are held by The Archives of the Episcopal Church.

== Awards and honors ==
- Silver medal, Louisiana Purchase Exposition, St. Louis

== Notable people ==
- Frederic Dan Huntington
- James Huntington
- Harriette A. Keyser
- Henry C. Potter
