= Harriette A. Keyser =

American industrial reformer, social worker, and author (1841-1936)

Harriette Amelia Keyser
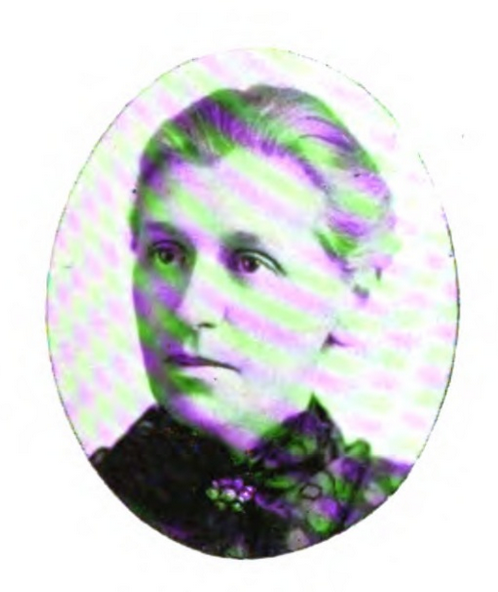
- Born: July 27, 1841; New York City
- Died: October 9, 1936 (aged 95); New York City
- Occupations: industrial reformer; social worker; author
- Organization: Church Association for the Advancement of the Interests of Labor

Harriette A. Keyser (July 27, 1841 – October 9, 1936) was an American industrial reformer, social worker, and author. Keyser was a prominent figure in the struggle for the betterment of industrial conditions. It was through her efforts, that many reforms, accepted today as ordinary business procedure, were instituted. Keyser’s name was most closely associated with Church Association for the Advancement of the Interests of Labor (C. A. I. L.), founded in 1887, and the Working Woman’s Society. She was one of the organizers of the New York Woman Suffrage Association, 1893–95. She served as editor of C. A. I. L.'s organ, Hammer and Pen, and published three books.

== Early life and education ==
Harriette (sometimes spelled Harrietta) Amelia Keyser was born in New York City, July 27, 1841, (Note: According to Woman's Who's who of America (1914), Harriette was born July 21, 1841.) the daughter of John Howard and Harrietta Ward Dixon Tuthill Keyser. Her great-grandfather, Michael Keyser, came to New York City from Austria, although it was a tradition in the family that the Keysers were originally Hollanders and that one of the members settled in Austria. On the maternal side, Keyser was a descendant of John Gedney, who came from Norfolk, England, in 1603, and settled in Westchester County, New York. The line of descent is through the Haineses, Dixons and Tuthills. The Mollie Haines mentioned in Revolutionary annals was an ancestor.

Keyser was one of a large family. Her mother was a woman of intense spirituality. Her father, an anti-slavery Whig, and one of the founders of the Republican Party, was a delegate to the 1860 Republican National Convention at Chicago, which nominated Abraham Lincoln, and even at that early day, he believed in the enfranchisement of women. These and other questions of importance were freely discussed by him and his guests, at the family dinner table where young Harriette heard the varied opinions.

Her prescribed education was brief — some years at a public school in New York City, and then at Ellenville Academy, which she left at fourteen, followed by some private instruction in elocution, French, German and music. She had learned to read at three, and gained knowledge from books among which she browsed at will. The old Astor Library and the Mercantile Library were her two chief sources of supply, and it was largely because of the guidance in her reading that the librarians there gave her, that many years later, she advocated increased pay for librarians. Her summers were spent in Napanoch, New York, ranging over the Shawangunk Ridge on foot or horseback, and rowing on the creek.

== Career ==
She began teaching at the age of 17, during the years 1858–72, but after four years spent in the primary and grammar grades of New York public schools, gave it up to continue her study of music, and to take up art. She entered Cooper Union for a time, but was forced to leave by family financial reverses which made self-support necessary. She entered the field of journalism, supplying articles to the Evening Globe. She enjoyed the work, but after a year, the paper failed, and as journalism for women was in its early stages, and openings few, she relinquished the idea of a journalistic career, and took up lecturing, delivering her first lecture — characteristically on women — in the large hall of Cooper Union. But lecturing proved too slow and unremunerative for her purpose, and it was supplanted by the study of stenography.

Her first business position was as stenographer to the auditor and later to the vice-president of the Western Union Telegraph Company, and she remained there, the company’s first woman stenographer, for thirteen years (1875–87). During her years there, she wrote two novels, one, On the Borderland, expounding the then little considered theory of the use of music in the treatment of insanity, and second, Thorns in Your Sides, with a labor theme, laid in New York and Ireland.

At the end of her term with the Western Union, she took a much needed rest on a trip to England. While there, she was deeply interested in the missions in the East End of London, and was so impressed by their work that on her return to the U.S., she gave a series of lectures on this subject in a number of parish houses. During the period of 1888–91, she held the position as registrar of Teachers' College, Columbia University, then in its infancy.

=== C.A.I.L. ===
In 1887, C.A.I.L. was organized by nine clergymen of the Episcopal Diocese of New York, for the purpose of arousing the clergy and laity of the Episcopal Church to a consideration of industrial problems generally tabooed by the community at large. All Episcopal communicants were eligible as members. The principles set forth by this society were simply a formal statement of what Keyser had always believed — namely that:

1. It is of the essence of the teachings of Jesus Christ that God is the Father of all men, and that all men are brothers.
2. God is the sole possessor of the earth and its fullness; Man is but the steward of God’s bounties.
3. Labor being the exercise of body, mind and spirit in the broadening and elevating of human life, it is the duty of every man to labor diligently.
4. Labor, as thus defined, should be the standard of social worth.
5. When the divinely-intended opportunity to labor is given to all men, one great cause of the present widespread suffering and destitu¬ tion will be removed.

She gladly accepted these principles, and became a member, in 1878, of that society which later became almost synonymous with her name. In 1878, such opinions were considered extremely radical, especially as for the first time, they declared labor to be a standard of social worth.

About this time, too, Keyser joined the Working Women's Society, established to promote the organization of women for their industrial interests. C. A. I. L. sympathized with this association, and Keyser's first active work was done in connection with both societies. The Working Women’s Society had brought to public notice the bad conditions for saleswomen and cash girls in most of the New York retail stores, and set to work to remedy them, with the cooperation of C. A. I. L. who secured over one hundred clergymen of all denominations. A meeting was held where a joint committee, of which Keyser was an active member, was appointed to prepare a white list of employers of fair dealing, and from this, in a short time, grew the Consumers' League.

As representative of the Working Women's Society, Keyser was appointed to make addresses, to appear at legislative hearings in Albany, New York and to go as a delegate to the World's Congress of Representative Women of the World's Columbian Exposition in 1893, in Chicago under the Department of Industry. There she delivered an address on "Organization Among Women, an Instrument Promoting the Interest of Industry", speaking on the same platform with Susan B. Anthony, who was advocating organization for political liberty. During the convention, she also made addresses in the smaller halls opening on the corridors, thus reaching many strollers who would not have taken the trouble to go to a meeting of this sort at home.

A natural outgrowth of this work was that for woman’s suffrage, her other important contribution to the improvement of women. She had been watching its development with great interest, and at the convention, she had seen many people converted, almost in passing, by the compelling talks of Anthony, Elizabeth Cady Stanton, and others. In 1893, the Suffrage Society of New York State instituted a campaign urging, by petitions to the Constitutional Convention, the elimination of the restrictive word "male", pertaining to voting, from the State Constitution, and Keyser affiliated herself with this Society, in addition to the Working Women's Society and C.A.I.L., realizing, more fully, from the work she had done, the necessity for the enfranchisement of women in industry, to better their conditions.

The Suffrage Association welcomed such an earnest and powerful ally as Keyser and sent her to the Adirondacks as an organizer. It was a new area, and the suffrage movement there needed much attention. After she had worked successfully, though under difficulties, for a time, she was called to wider fields, and later was appointed organizer for the New York City Suffrage League. Keyser, doing office work during the day, and making two or three addresses every evening, still kept sufficient energy to secure union endorsements of women’s suffrage, embracing several hundred thousand members, by means of addresses to labor organizations. The campaign failed, however, and at the close of the convention, the New York City Suffrage League continued its work in many assembly district clubs, and sent Keyser to them for the purpose of giving political instruction. During her suffrage work, she had joined the woman’s Law class at New York University, graduating in 1896, and was well fitted to instruct others along these lines.

While she carried on all this work, she was at the same time, an active member of the executive committee of C.A.I.L., and in 1894, gave up all other public work in order to concentrate her activities upon the church labor movement of that society. This was the beginning of many years of strenuous labor and she kept herself fit for the arduous tasks she was called upon to perform, by her ability to relax when the occasion demanded, spending her vacations in Maine with a congenial group of friends, many of them C.A.I.L. members, and often times conducting her work from there. The resignation of the secretary, William Harmon Van Allen had been tendered, and the valuable activities of Father James Huntington and Father Allen, two of the founders, had been given up, and Keyser was appointed to construct a plan for the reorganization of the society. The plan she submitted was unanimously adopted.

Labor conditions then were different from the present day state of affairs. Men and women in industry were denied the barest rights of human beings in many cases, and organization, then beginning to make itself felt, was the only means by which they could protect themselves from the greed and selfishness of employers. C.A.I.L. first recognized organized labor. From church chancels and parish house platforms, at national and state conventions, and at meetings of local unions of the American Federation of Labor, Keyser spoke of the spiritual side of the labor movement, and urged fraternal relations between the church and labor. Her ability to make her point with brevity, and the sincerity, enthusiasm, logic, and humor playing over all she said, commanded attention. She came in close contact with many of the labor leaders, taking council with Samuel Gompers and others of the Federation. They valued the help of C.A.I.L. because it did not deal in doctrinal propaganda, but strove for justice to all sorts and conditions of people.

At the time, there was no eight-hour business day. Keyser was unfailing in her efforts to establish this, and one day’s rest in seven for workers. From her efforts in the latter direction, grew the large and important Actors’ Church Alliance. In 1899, Keyser won the attention of the President to Sunday rest for actors, and, bringing the matter before the executive committee of C.A.I.L., the new society was formed the same year.

She also did important work in her fight against the sweating system and child labor. In 1902, when interest in the matter of Southern legislation had been aroused, Keyser investigated conditions in southern factories, and the Hammer and Pen, official organ of C.A.I.L., reported all her findings. The legislative committee of C.A.I.L., in 1907, succeeded in getting through the New York State Legislature the best child labor bill in any state at that time.

Her work also included the investigation of factories and mines, and strikes, and she was sent to the coal mining districts to do what her society found practicable. They endorsed a larger number of factory inspectors, and she appeared at legislative hearings, urging justice for workers.

She was a member of St. Michael's Protestant Episcopal Church, and the rector, Dr. John Punnett Peters, at her request, welcomed the organization of a meeting in the Church in the interest of the striking cloakmakers of the East Side. Bishop Henry C. Potter presided, Dr. Peters and Keyser, two representatives from the Cloakmakers' Union, and others spoke from the chancel with the result that a sweatshop committee was formed, which consistently and vigorously worked to abolish that abuse. Conditions arising from sweating in tenement houses were presented at a meeting in St. Michael's Parish House, by Dr. Annie S. Daniel, chair of the tenement house committee, and C.A.I.L.'s policy, formulated in a motion made by Keyser, was extended to the effort for abolition of manufacturing in tenement houses, the last refuge of the sweating system.

In 1896, C.A.I.L. established the first practical arbitration committee of conciliation and mediation, beside those established by organized labor. Bishop Potter was its chairman. Keyser lent her efforts to preaching the economic waste of industrial war, and promoting the interests of arbitration, as some help in the prevention of labor conflicts.

In 1901, at the Episcopal Triennial Convention at San Francisco, a Commission of Capital and Labor was established with Bishop Potter as chair. Keyser had worked for and won the recognition of C.A.I.L. and now as its secretary, worked under this commission. After the death of Bishop Potter, the Social Service Commission was substituted for the earlier one. The Diocesan Social Service Commissions were established through the request of C.A.I.L., to the General Convention, in 1907. Through the efforts of Bishop Arthur Selden Lloyd, in 1922, the Diocesan Social Service Commission of the Diocese of New York, appointed C. A. I. L. to constitute a Department of Industry in that Diocese, with Keyser as its secretary.

At the time of the 1901 Pan-American Exposition at Buffalo, New York, Keyser prepared tenement house and labor exhibits for C.A.I.L. to send there, and these won silver medals, both there and with later ones sent to the San Francisco Panama–Pacific International Exposition. Both C. A. I. L. and the Working Women's Society exploited conditions in tenement houses, and Keyser’s activities for their betterment helped in securing improved conditions.

C.A.I.L. had become well known by this time as a champion of fair conditions and the clerks in the department stores of Harlem asked its assistance in obtaining shorter hours Saturday nights. Keyser, accompanied by the Rev. Francis J. Moran, addressed the street crowds from a wagon in 125th Street, and afterward held a meeting in a hall there, to address the clerks. C.A.I.L. organized a meeting and secured the cooperation of the Harlem clergy in this movement.

Keyser poured her energy into C.A.I.L.'s campaign to aid the grocer clerks to close the stores in Greater New York at 7 P. M. instead of late in the evening, and she was untiring in conferring with union representatives, and making addresses on the subject, until the fight was won. As Secretary of C.A I.L., she struggled, also, to lighten the burdens of the laundry workers of New York who were oppressed in wages and working conditions. Jointly with the Women's Trade Union League, services and meetings were held, where addresses were made by the union laundry workers and Keyser in several Episcopal Parish houses after Sunday night services. C.A.I.L. welcomed the efforts for better conditions instituted by the New York State Industrial Commission.

Keyser was an ardent admirer of the bishops of her church, for in her work, she always found them a democratic and open minded body of men. Bishop Huntington, Bishop Potter, and later, Bishop Burch and Bishop Lloyd, were her closest friends among them. After Bishop Potter’s death, she paid tribute to him in her book, Bishop Potter, the People's Friend, which also told of the rise of C.A.I.L. in the Diocese of New York, and the expansion of the church labor movement it initiated.

== Death ==
Keyser died, unmarried, in New York City on October 9, 1936, aged 95.

== Selected works ==
=== Novels ===
- On the Borderland (1882) (text)
- Thorns in Your Sides (1884)

=== Biographies ===
- Bishop Potter, the People's Friend (1910) (text)
