= Elizabeth Porter =

Elizabeth Porter may refer to:

- Elizabeth Porter (died 1752), known as "Tetty", wife of Samuel Johnson, an English writer
- Elizabeth Porter Phelps (1747–1817), important diarist from Massachusetts
- Elizabeth W. Porter (born 1964), member of the Florida House of Representatives
