= DeDe Duncan-Probe =

Episcopalian bishop

The Right Reverend DeDe Duncan-Probe
- Bishop of Central New York
- Church: Episcopal Church
- Diocese: Central New York
- Elected: August 6, 2016
- In office: 2016–present
- Predecessor: Gladstone B. Adams III

Orders
- Ordination: 2004
- Consecration: December 3, 2016 by Michael Curry

Personal details
- Denomination: Anglican
- Spouse: Chris Probe
- Children: 3

DeDe Duncan-Probe is the eleventh and current bishop of the Episcopal Diocese of Central New York.

== Biography ==
Duncan-Probe graduated with a Bachelor of Science in education from Stephen F. Austin State University. She also has a Master of Arts in psychology from Pepperdine University and a Master of Divinity from General Theological Seminary. She also has a Doctor of Philosophy from The Foundation House/ Oxford University.

She was ordained priest in 2004 and has served in All Saints’ Church in Stoneham, Massachusetts, St John's Church in McLean, Virginia, and Holy Comforter Church in Vienna, Virginia. She also served as Prior to rector of St Peter's in the Woods Church in Fairfax Station, Virginia between 2009 and 2016. She was also Dean of Region VII of the Diocese of Virginia.

She was elected Bishop of Central New York on August 6, 2016, and was consecrated bishop on December 3, 2016, at the Holiday Inn Convention Center in Liverpool, New York by Presiding Bishop Michael Curry. In 2018, she planned a liturgy for the General Convention, at the request of Curry, that offered “lament and repentance” for sexual abuse, exploitation, and harassment.

In 2024 Duncan-Probe was one of the nominees to succeed Curry as Presiding Bishop of the Episcopal Church.
