= Willowbrook Cemetery =

Cemetery in Fairfield County, Connecticut, US

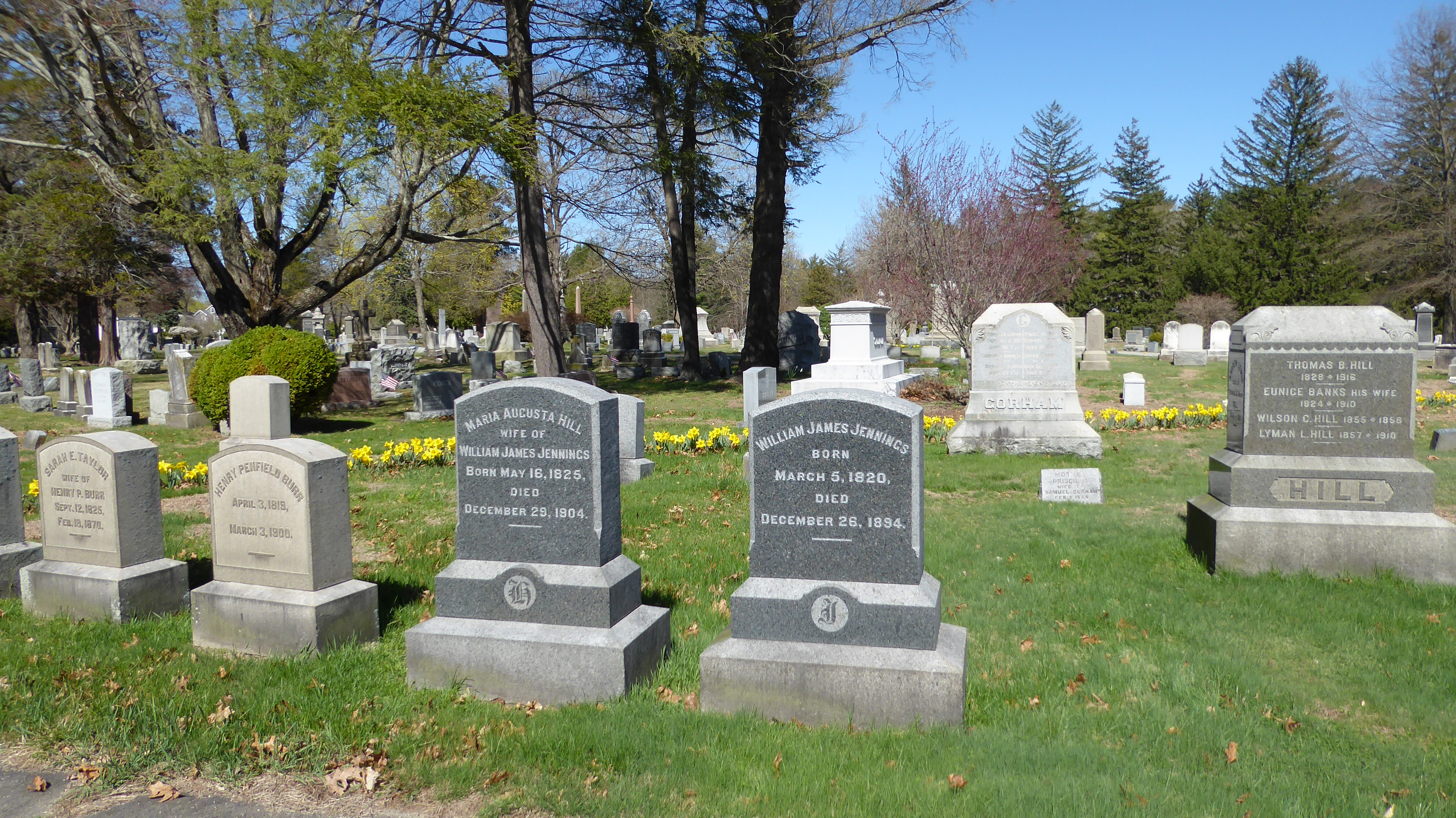
- Interactive map of Willowbrook Cemetery

Details
- Established: 1847
- Location: Westport, Connecticut
- Country: United States
- Coordinates: 41°09′17″N 73°21′43″W
- Type: Public
- Owned by: Willowbrook Cemetery Association, Inc.
- Website: Official website
- Find a Grave: Willowbrook Cemetery

Willowbrook Cemetery is located at 395 Main Street in Westport, Connecticut. Established in 1847, the cemetery is located close to Westport's downtown area, and features the burials of many members of Westport's historic families, including the Coley, Burr, Nash, Bedford, Bradley and Hurlbutt families.

== Notable interments ==
Notable interments here include:

- E.T. Bedford, executive of Standard Oil
- Edward H. Coley, bishop of the Episcopal Diocese of Central New York
- Peter De Vries, editor and novelist
- James Earle Fraser, sculptor, and his wife Laura Gardin Fraser, sculptor
- Harold Jacoby, astronomer
- Morris Ketchum, financier
- Alexander Kipnis, Ukrainian-born operatic bass singer
- Lawrence Langner, playwright, author, and producer
- Lars-Eric Lindblad, entrepreneur and tourism explorer
- Vivian Perlis, musicologist
- Fritz Reiner, conductor
- Frederick M. Salmon, politician
- Alexander McCormick Sturm, co-founder of American firearm maker Sturm, Ruger & Co.
- Mort Walker, cartoonist
- John B. Watson, a psychologist who established the psychological school of behaviorism
- Arthur Dare Whiteside, part of the Air Policy Commission under president Truman and president of Dun & Bradstreet.
- George Hand Wright, artist
