= James Huntington =

American Episcopal priest and professed monk (1854-1935)

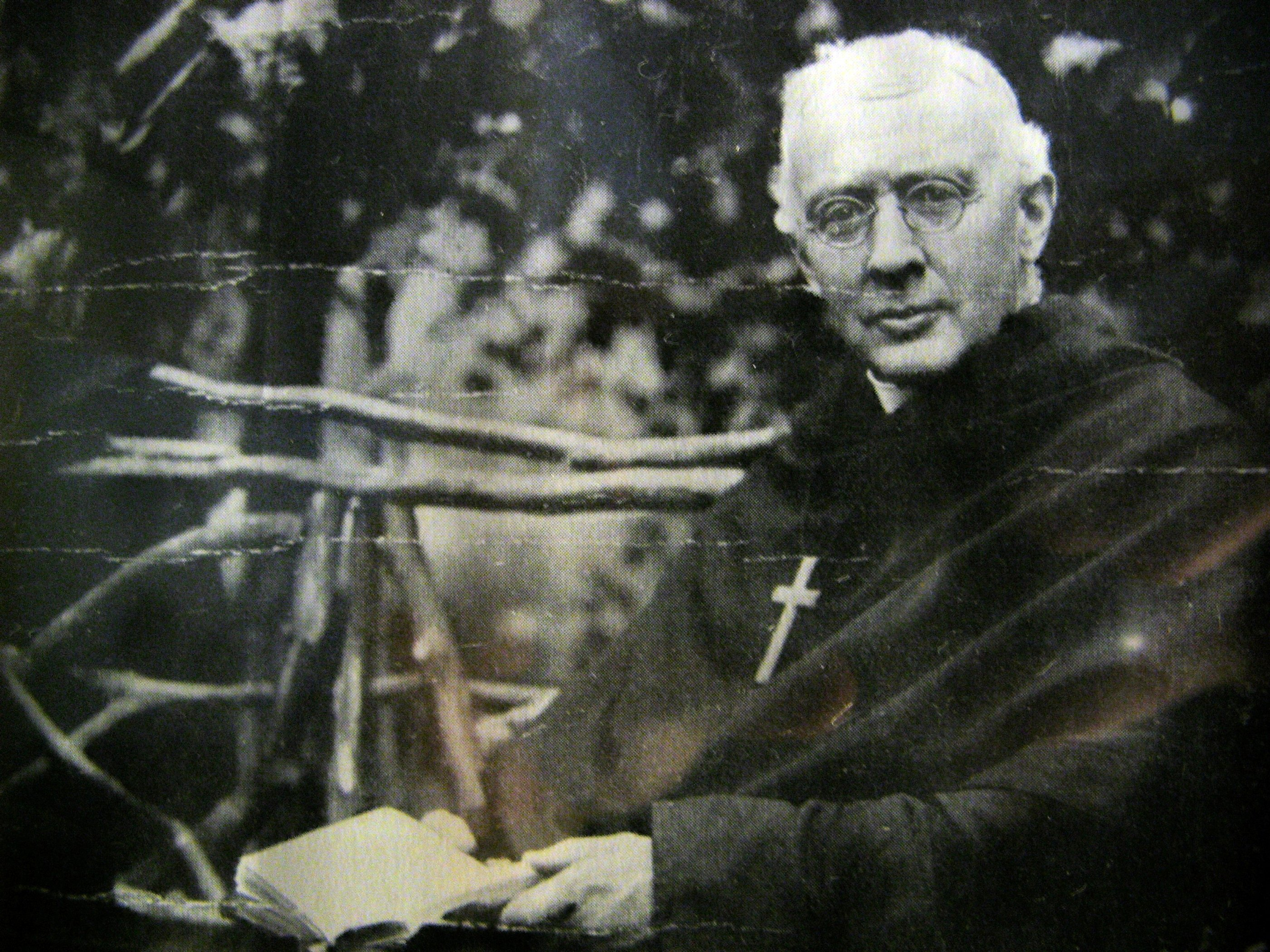
Huntington, c. 1920s

James Otis Sargent Huntington OHC (1854–1935) was an American Episcopal priest and professed monk who founded the Order of the Holy Cross, a Benedictine monastic order for men, whose mother house is now located in West Park, New York.

== Early and family life ==
James Huntington was born on 23 July 1854 in Roxbury, Massachusetts, the younger son of Frederick Dan and Hannah Huntington. While he was a child his father, a Unitarian minister, converted to the Episcopal Church, was ordained deacon then priest, became rector of Emmanuel Episcopal Church, Boston, and was soon consecrated Bishop of Central New York. After completing studies at St. John's Academy, Manlius, New York, where he was head boy in 1873, James went to Harvard, as had his father. After graduation, Huntington studied for the ministry at St. Andrew's Divinity School in Syracuse.

== Ministry ==
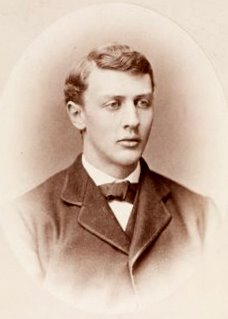
Huntington, c. 1875

Huntington was ordained priest by his father on 30 May 1880. In 1880 James ministered to a working class congregation at Calvary Mission, Syracuse. The following year he went to Holy Cross Mission on Manhattan's Lower East Side. Soon after his ordination, Huntington attended a retreat at St. Clement's Church in Philadelphia and began to feel called to the monastic life. Rather than join the Society of St. John the Evangelist which had established a foundation in Boston ten years before, Huntington decided to found an American congregation, the Order of the Holy Cross with two companions, Robert Dod and James Cameron. They continued working in the poorest sections of the Lower East Side. The grueling hours and daily regimen of community life took its toll, and his companions left. On Nov. 25, 1884, at the Chapel of the Sisters of St. John the Baptist, New York City, Huntington made his profession as a monk.

Huntington also became involved in the labor union and Georgist land-tax movements. He was later a founder of the Church Association for the Advancement of the Interests of Labor (C. A. I. L.), and was an early member of the Knights of Labor.

The Order of the Holy Cross chose Huntington as Superior for several non-consecutive terms. However, he concentrated his time and energy on parish and missionary work. Under his leadership, the order moved to rural Westminster, Maryland, in the 1890s, and in 1902 to West Park, New York.

The cornerstone for the order's monastery, which now serves as its guest house, was laid in 1902, and the building was finished in 1904. Designed by Gothic-Revival Architect Henry Vaughan, it was the first building built for an Anglican religious order since the reign of Henry VIII. Huntington also founded or helped to found St. Faith's Home for Wayward Girls in Tarrytown, New York, St. Andrew's School at Sewanee, Kent School in Kent, Connecticut (in 1906 by Frederick H. Sill), and a Mission in Liberia, Africa.

== Death and legacy ==
Huntington died on 28 June 1935 and is buried in the Monastery Church of St Augustine in West Park. The order he founded remains active; several of the schools the order founded also continue teaching children. The Episcopal Church commemorates Huntington annually on the anniversary of his entry into monastic life, 25 November 1884.

== Sources ==
- Biography and Lectionary Readings for James O.S. Huntington
- Holy Cross Monastery's web site
- Description of the Porter-Phelps-Huntington Family Papers in Five College Archives and Manuscript Collections
- New York State Men: Biographic Studies and Character Portraits. Frederick S. Hills, Compiler Editor; The Argus Company, Albany, N.Y., 1910
