= Ruth Huntington Sessions =

American memoirist

- Born: Ruth Gregson Huntington; November 3, 1859; Cambridge, Massachusetts
- Died: December 2, 1946 (aged 87); Syracuse, New York
- Occupation: Writer
- Spouse: Archibald Lowery Sessions (m. 1887)
- Children: Roger Sessions
- Parent: Frederic Dan Huntington
- Relatives: Elizabeth Porter Phelps (great-grandmother)

Ruth Gregson Huntington Sessions (November 3, 1859 – December 2, 1946) was an American writer, known for her 1936 memoir, Sixty Odd: A Personal History.

== Early life ==
Ruth Gregson Huntington was born in Cambridge, Massachusetts, the daughter of Frederic Dan Huntington and Hannah Dane Sargent Huntington. Her father was an Episcopal clergyman at the Emmanuel Church in Boston. When she was nine years old, her father became a bishop, and she moved to Syracuse, New York.

At age 16, Huntington attended the Third Congress of the Association for the Advancement of Women, which was held in Syracuse, New York. She met Louisa May Alcott, Maria Mitchell, Elizabeth Cady Stanton, Catherine Beecher, Julia Ward Howe, and Mary A. Livermore at the event. As a young woman she studied piano in Germany with Clara Schumann.

Her great-grandmother was diarist Elizabeth Porter Phelps.

== Career ==
Sessions was one of the founding members of the Consumers' League, and president of the Consumers' League of Brooklyn, lecturing and organizing for improved labor conditions and against child labor. She was founder of the Children's Home Association in Northampton, Massachusetts. She wrote poems, short stories, and essays. She was active in the Girls' Friendly Society of America, and literary editor of the Girls' Friendly Magazine. She supervised student housing at Smith College, where her home is now a campus building known as Sessions House. In 1936, she published her memoir, Sixty Odd: A Personal History.

== Personal life ==
Ruth Huntington married her second cousin, lawyer Archibald Lowery Sessions, in 1887. They had four children, including composer Roger Sessions. One daughter died in infancy in 1891. Ruth Huntington Sessions died in 1946, aged 87 years, at her daughter's home in Syracuse. Her papers and other effects are in the Porter-Phelps-Huntington Family Papers at the University of Massachusetts, Amherst and at the Porter–Phelps–Huntington House.
