= Porter–Phelps–Huntington House =

Historic house in Massachusetts, United States

- U.S. National Register of Historic Places
- U.S. Historic district – Contributing property
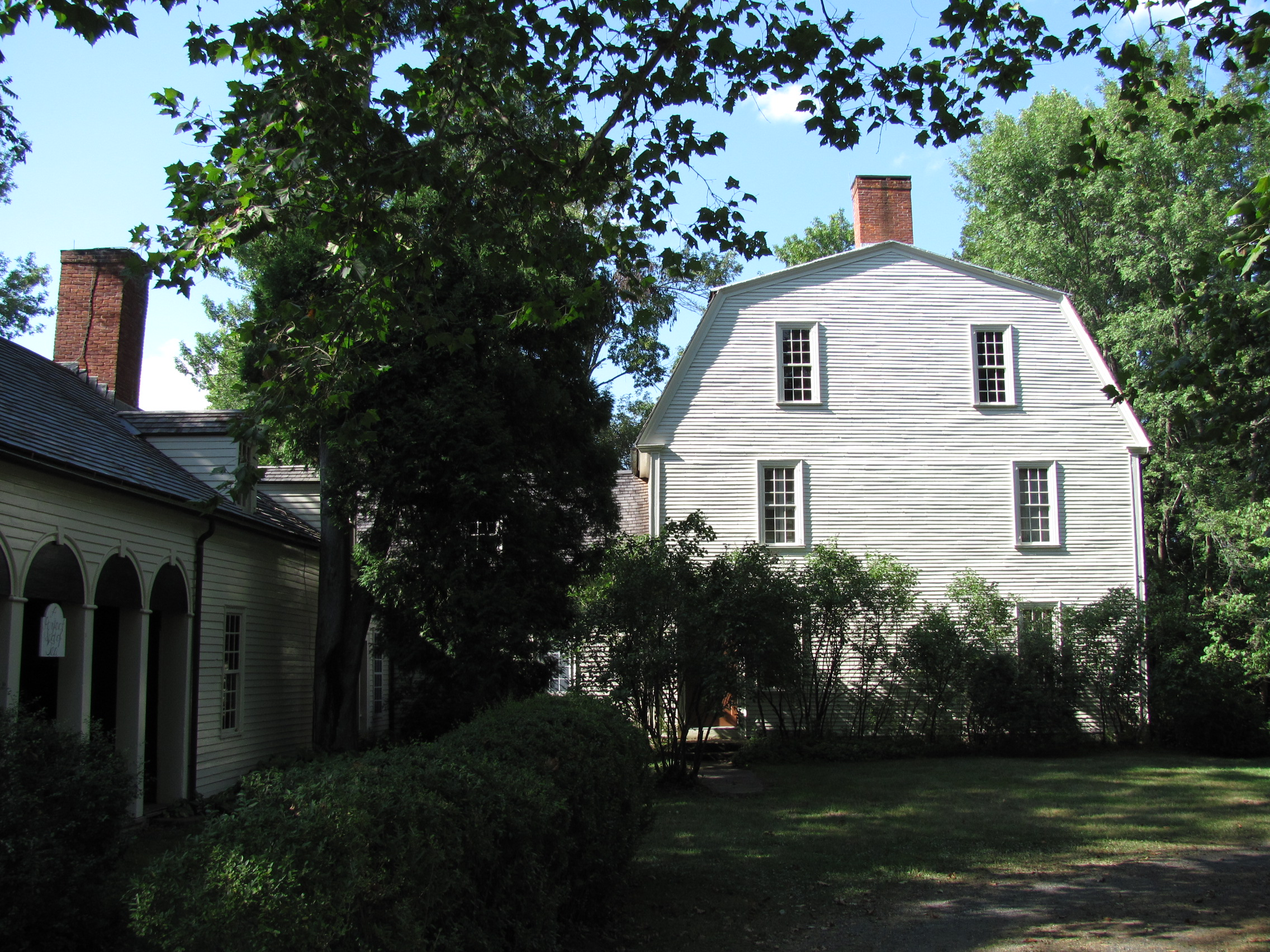
- Porter–Phelps–Huntington House

- Location within Massachusetts Location within the United States
- Location: 130 River Dr., Hadley, Massachusetts
- Coordinates: 42°22′19″N 72°35′24″W
- Area: 2 acres (0.81 ha)
- Built: 1752
- Architect: Porter, Moses; Phelps, Charles
- Architectural style: Colonial
- Part of: Forty Acres and Its Skirts Historic District (ID100008956)
- NRHP reference No.: 73000303

Significant dates
- Added to NRHP: March 26, 1973
- Designated CP: May 4, 2023

The Porter–Phelps–Huntington House, known historically as Forty Acres, is a historic house museum at 130 River Drive in Hadley, Massachusetts. It is open seasonally, from May to October. The house contains the collection of one extended family, with objects dating from the seventeenth to twentieth centuries. It was occupied from its construction in 1752 until the 1940s, when a member of the eighth generation of the family in the house turned it into a museum. Its collection is entirely derived from the family, and the extensive archives, including the original diary of Elizabeth Porter Phelps, are held at the University of Massachusetts Amherst. The house was added to the National Register of Historic Places in 1973, and is a central feature of the Forty Acres and Its Skirts Historic District, designated in 2023.

== Description and history ==
The Porter–Phelps–Huntington House is located in the rural setting of Hadley, between River Drive (Massachusetts Route 47) and the Connecticut River. The main block of the house is a 2-1/2 story wood frame structure, with a gambrel roof and clapboarded exterior. To its rear is attached a 1-1/2 story ell with a gabled roof; a long ell extending southward containing a kitchen, dairy, corn barn and secondary dwelling; and an addition to the north, containing another kitchen. The front facade has symmetrically but unevenly placed windows flanking a center entrance.

The house's construction history begins in 1752, when Moses and Elizabeth Pitkin Porter opted to build what is believed to be the first house to be built outside Hadley's town center. After their daughter Elizabeth married Charles Phelps, an ell was added to house a larger kitchen. The house achieved its present form in the 1790s, when the couple added the long south ell and larger production kitchen to support more ambitious dairy production, and a second kitchen to support the growing household. The gambrel roof was added to house an apartment for son Charles Porter Phelps, but was never completed; he would instead build Phelps Farm, across River Drive from his parents' home.

The house next passed to Elizabeth Whiting Phelps and her husband Dan Huntington, who married in 1801; they would raise eleven children. Their youngest son, Frederic Dan Huntington (an Episcopal minister in Boston and later a bishop in Syracuse), inherited the house and would use it as a summer home. His grandson, James Lincoln Huntington, acquired full ownership of the house in 1929, and gradually converted it from a family dwelling to a historic house museum.

The Porter family was very prominent locally, dating back to the founding of Hadley in 1659. Some members of the extended family achieved prominence regionally, nationally, and internationally. These include Benjamin Lincoln, a major general in the Continental Army during the American Revolution; Frederic Dan Huntington, first Episcopal bishop of the Episcopal Diocese of Central New York; actress Catherine Sargent Huntington; memoirist Ruth Huntington Sessions; and composer Roger Sessions.

== Slavery at the Porter-Phelps-Huntington House ==
The Porter–Phelps–Huntington House serves as an excellent lens through which to view the history of slavery in Western Massachusetts, especially in the town of Hadley. Slavery has existed in Hadley since the town's founding; the first four ministers of the town were all slave owners. Samuel Porter, the great-grandfather of Moses Porter, bought the Porter family's first slave in 1698 from a man named Joseph Smith. Later, when Moses Porter set up his household in 1752, he enslaved two people: Zebulon Prutt and Peg. Phelps bought Zebulon from Jerusha Chauncey, a fellow resident of Hadley. Zebulon was fourteen years old at the time of sale, and Porter paid one hundred and fifty pounds to Chauncey for him.

When Moses Phelps was killed in 1756 in Bloody Morning Scout, a battle at Lake George during the French and Indian War, both Zebulon and Peg were listed in the probate inventory of Porter’ possessions. Ten years after Moses Porter's death, Zebulon fled Forty Acres; Elizabeth Pitkin Porter opted to sell Prutt to another resident, Oliver Warner. The advertisement Porter and Warner together placed in the Connecticut Courant described Zebulon as having a “whitish complexion” and noted that he may “have a Squaw in company”.

Moses and Elizabeth's daughter, also named Elizabeth, married Charles Phelps in 1770. That same year, Phelps bought an enslaved man named Cesar for "sixty six pounds, thirteen shillings, and four pence" from William Williams in New Marlsborough, New York. He and Elizabeth also enslaved a woman named Phillis, who would give birth in the 1760s to two daughters, Rose and Phillis. Rose became a mother as well, to a daughter also named Phillis - a third generation of women enslaved at the site.

After the start of the Revolutionary War, Cesar joined the Continental Army. In a letter back to Charles Phelps from Fort Ticonderoga, Cesar wrote:

“I take this opportunity to enform [sic] you that I don’t entend [sic] to live with Capt. Cranston if I can help it and I could be glad if you would send me a letter that I may git [sic] my wagers [sic] and I want to know how all the Talk Do at Home and I Desire you Prayers for me While in the Sarves [sic] and if you Determine to see me I want you Shud [sic] send me my Sock and Buckel [sic] So no more at Present but I Remain your Even Faithful Slave.

- Sezor Philips"

Cesar never returned from the war, and it is unclear whether he died during the war or ran way. Peg had been sold in 1772 to a man named Stephen Fay from Bennington, Vermont, but was repurchased in 1778. She lived in Hadley until her death in 1792, when she was a member of the household of Ralph Way.

== See also ==
- National Register of Historic Places listings in Hampshire County, Massachusetts
