= O'Kelley Whitaker =

American bishop

The Right Reverend O'Kelley Whitaker D.D.
- Bishop of Central New York
- Church: Episcopal Church
- Diocese: Central New York
- In office: 1983–1992
- Predecessor: Ned Cole
- Successor: David B. Joslin
- Previous post: Coadjutor Bishop of Central New York (1981-1983)

Orders
- Ordination: 1952
- Consecration: May 16, 1981 by John Allin

Personal details
- Born: December 26, 1926 Durham, North Carolina, United States
- Died: June 25, 2015 (aged 88)
- Denomination: Anglican
- Parents: Faison Y. Whitaker & Margaret Elizabeth O'Kelley
- Spouse: Betty Francis Abernathy
- Children: 3

O'Kelley Whitaker (December 26, 1926 – June 25, 2015) was eighth bishop of the Episcopal Diocese of Central New York.

== Biography ==
Whitaker was born in Durham, North Carolina on December 26, 1926. He graduated with a Bachelor of Arts in Philosophy from Duke University in 1949 and then studied at Seabury-Western Theological Seminary. He was ordained deacon and priest in 1952. He served as rector of St Andrew's Church in Charlotte, North Carolina. He also served as a hospital corpsman in the US Navy during WWII. In 1973 he became the Dean of St Luke's Cathedral in Orlando, Florida.

On November 7, 1980, Whitaker was elected Coadjutor Bishop of Central New York during the 112th General Convention which took place in Syracuse, New York. He was consecrated bishop by John Allin, Presiding Bishop, on May 16, 1981, in the Oncenter War Memorial Arena. He was awarded an honorary Doctor of Divinity in 1981 by Seabury-Western. He succeeded as diocesan bishop in 1983 and retired in 1992. Between 1992 and 1997 he served as Assistant Bishop of Southern Virginia.

== Works ==
Whitaker was the author of several hymns and also wrote a book named Sister Death in 1974.
