= Rebecca Dickinson =

American gownmaker (1738–1815)

Rebecca Dickinson (July 25, 1738 – December 31, 1815) was an American gownmaker who lived during the mid-to-late eighteenth century and the early nineteenth century. She is significant as the author of a journal in which she writes about her life as an artisan in the context of a woman actively engaging in the economy and a Calvinist in New England in the years following the Revolutionary War (1787–1802). Throughout her life, Dickinson chose to live as a single woman in Hatfield, Massachusetts, sustaining herself through her trade. Her surviving journal documents her struggle to understand her singlehood in the context of her faith. Her diary also allows a glimpse into the lives of people, especially women, living through extremely influential historical events.

== Early life ==
Rebecca Dickinson (sometimes spelled as Rebekah or Rebeca) was born in Hatfield, Massachusetts, as the oldest daughter of six children born to farmer and dairy man Moses Dickinson and Anna Smith. Named after her grandmother, Rebecca Barrett Wright, Dickinson entered a world of political and religious concerns. The relatively small town of Hatfield (which held a population of 803 in 1765) had a history of political, military, and religious upheaval for more than half of a century before Dickinson was born. Such conflict is demonstrated by the fact that Rebecca's own grandmother, Canada Waite, was born in captivity as her mother, Martha Waite, had been captured by Natives and gave birth as a hostage. As a result of the conflict surrounding Hatfield as well as the religious upheaval occurring simultaneously, the people of Hatfield were often worried about the possibility of war and the state of their spiritual lives.

== Becoming an artisan ==
Around the age of twelve, Dickinson's parents sent her to an apprenticeship at mantua making so that she could learn the trade of gown making. Artisanal work in clothing production for Dickinson and other women was a way for them to earn money for their families at a young age, capitalizing on the social connections of these girls'/ women's families. Though many women had some knowledge of clothing construction and maintenance, given the expense of fabric, many women hired gownmakers to cut the pieces required to create a garment, since they could properly handle cutting and sewing the garment without ruining costly materials. As she emerged into adulthood, Dickinson became a well-known gownmaker in Massachusetts. One of her more important clients, Elizabeth Porter Phelps, gave her business through her large estate, Forty Acres, with other women in the community making it a habit to make an appearance when Dickinson was there. While Rebecca did have some higher profile and wealthier clients, fixing wardrobes for local families made up most of her business.

Dickinson went on to oversee apprenticeships for local children, with one of them being her niece Rebecca. For her, apprentices were beneficial as they provided an extra set of hands for daily work and offered companionship. At the height of her career, Dickinson was part of a community of gownmaking women in the Connecticut Valley who were well known for their work in altering wardrobes and creating new and fashionable garments.

== Diary ==
Dickinson was born during a period of increasing levels in female literacy during the eighteenth century in the colonies. This meant that she was among the population of young girls who were taught to read and write. These skills are what allowed her to start her own diary, which she began keeping in her thirties. An example of her diary comes from her earliest surviving diary entry on July 22, 1787, “This day is the 22 of July 1787. Here alone in this house. There has been a thunderstorm here this afternoon, some hard thunder and rain. It is good to be where God’s voice is to be heard.” Because of her marital status, she referred to herself as an “old maid”, which was a popular derogatory term that categorized older women who had never married. After the Revolutionary War in New England, however, some young women felt a sense of pride in holding such a position or reputation. Rediscovered in the late nineteenth century by relatives, Dickinson’s surviving diary consists of her struggles with her faith and her state of singlehood. Although “Aunt Bek” was well liked in Hatfield and had a reputation of a “Saint on Earth”, her diary reflects a constant tone of sadness and despair. Rebecca Dickinson kept a journal for years but she burned all of those that existed just before her forty-ninth birthday because she believed that they had been written poorly and were too concerned with "earthly" matters, such as motherhood and her personal possessions.

== Singlehood ==
Although Dickinson was offered marriage at least three times, she chose to live alone for most of her life as she did not find the idea of wifehood or having a traditional family attractive. Despite this choice and Dickinson's commitment to it, there were signs of both her regret and her embrace of singleness that were often reflected in her journal. Reflecting on a local newspaper in the summer of 1791, Dickinson wrote that an “old maid” who had died at the age of one hundred was given the status of “venerable”, which was a title she wanted to “live and die” by. A considerable portion of the suffering expressed within her journal came as a result of her loneliness, not necessarily a desire to have a family, but to have the sort of connections that matrimony had offered her female peers.

Dickinson’s first proposal of marriage came in the winter of 1777/ 1778, through her long-time client Elizabeth Porter Phelps. Phelps’s father-in-law, Charles Phelps, was in search of a new partner after his wife had died the previous winter. The second proposal came in 1787 from an unknown person and there are no diary entries that concern this marriage proposal other than one concerning her minister's wife, Hannah Lyman, who had questioned her about changing her name. The third proposal occurred in fall of 1788 by a physician named Moses Gunn. His proposal had intrigued her the most and was the one proposal that she had genuinely considered, but she ultimately decided that she would never change her name.

While Dickinson shows interest in both the single life and the married life in her diaries, her feelings grew after the death of her sister's husband when her sister had been left to raise a family alone. Whether her lifetime status of single is due to her commitment to faith or her overall disinterest in having a family cannot be proven. Whatever her reasons were, Dickinson was able to keep herself financially stable independent of a man to support her, unlike most women of the time and place, through her gown making and tailoring.

== Faith ==
Throughout her life, Dickinson was deeply devoted to her life as a Calvinist. She believed that singleness was part of God's plan for her, and that it was her specific "cross" to bear. Following September 1787, Dickinson was convinced that such desires of family-life and marriage were distracting her from her devotion to God. Following this, Rebecca became even more devoted in her commitment to living a life of singlehood. In May 1789, she wrote in her diary that because there were no children, grandchildren, or household for her to preoccupy her time with, her “spirit [would] hold communion with God at all times”. Coming from the Calvinist idea of predestination, Dickinson spent much of her time in religious contemplation in order to prepare herself for God. Though she was devoted to this life, she did express anger and confusion concerning why God was making her go through certain trials and struggles in her life. When her niece died at the age of one, she told herself that God took her niece away so that she would avoid distractions from her faith. This belief became a factor in her reasoning for never having children.

== Later life and death ==
On September 10, 1788, Dickinson chose to leave Hatfield for Bennington, Vermont where her sister, Martha, lived with her own family. In the course of this move, Martha’s husband became sick, forcing Dickinson to return to Hatfield. In August 1795, Dickinson permanently moved to live with her sister Miriam Billings. In her later years, she aimed to come to peace with her life alone. After the 1808 death of Silas Billings, Dickinson and her sister Miriam moved into Miriam's son Roswell’s home. In April 1810, Dickinson wrote her will and gaver her land in Williamsburg, Massachusetts to her nephews. In March 1815, she hurt her hip and nine months later, on December 31, 1815, Rebecca Dickinson died at the age of 77 from influenza. She was buried alongside her parents in Hatfield, Massachusetts.

== Legacy ==
Although none of the garments she constructed are known to survive, a set of crewelwork bed furnishings decorated with vines and flowers are preserved in the collections of the Pocumtuck Valley Memorial Association Library in Deerfield, Massachusetts, which also holds the manuscript diary. A sketch based on Dickinson's headcloth, made by Margaret C. Whiting in 1905, is also among the PVMA collections. A piano scarf, embroidered by Mary Wait Allis Hurlburt in 1916, and based on an element of Dickinson's crewelwork, survives in the collections of the Hatfield Historical Society, as does a firescreen believed to have been made by Dickinson.
