= Frederic Dan Huntington =

American bishop (1819–1904)

The Right Reverend Frederic Dan Huntington D.D.
- Bishop of Central New York
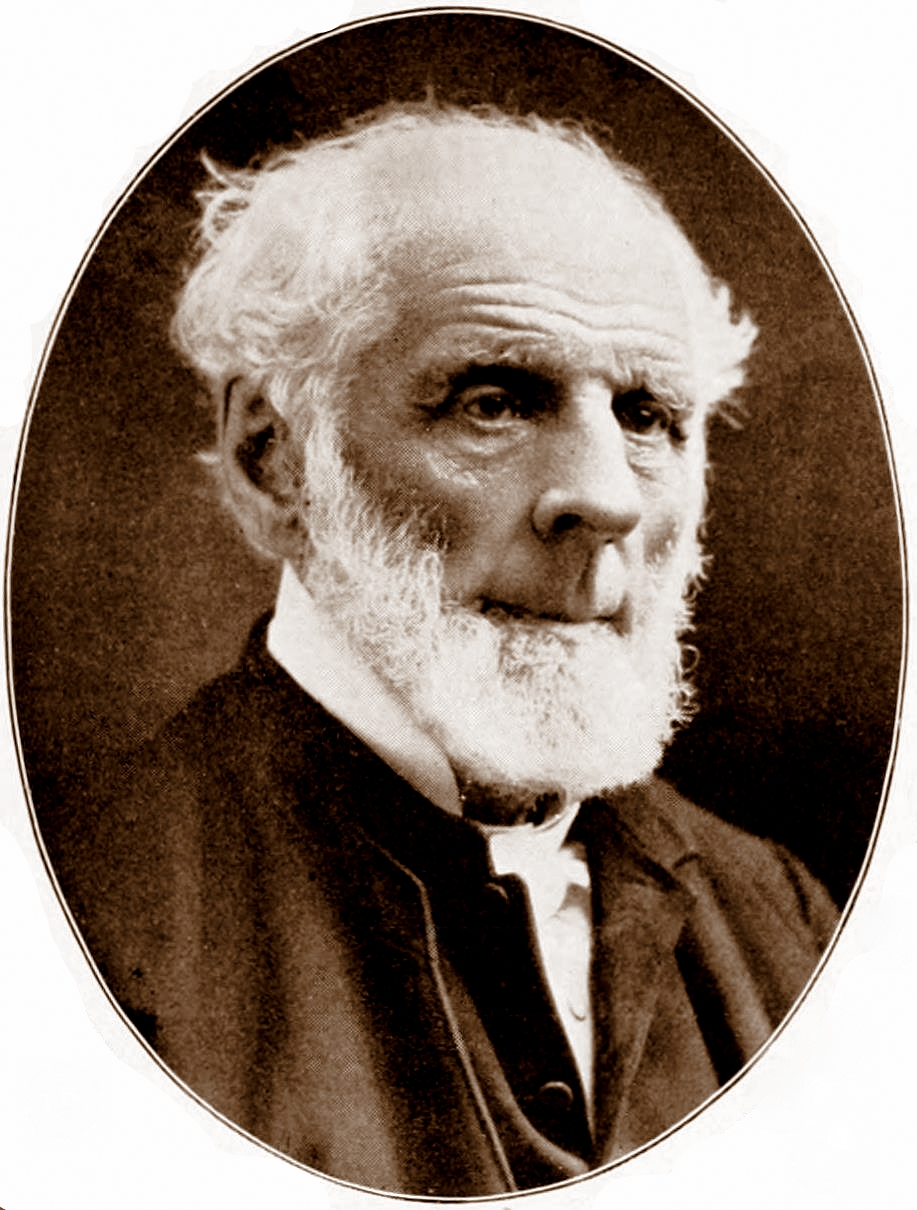
- Huntington circa 1900
- Church: Episcopal Church
- Diocese: Central New York
- Elected: 1868
- In office: 1869–1904
- Successor: Charles Tyler Olmstead

Orders
- Ordination: March 19, 1861 by Manton Eastburn
- Consecration: April 8, 1869 by Benjamin B. Smith

Personal details
- Born: May 28, 1819 Hadley, Massachusetts, United States
- Died: July 4, 1904 (aged 85) Hadley, Massachusetts, United States
- Buried: Old Hadley Cemetery, Hadley, Massachusetts
- Denomination: Anglican (prev. Unitarian)
- Parents: Daniel Huntington and Elizabeth Whiting Phelps
- Spouse: Hannah Dane Sargent
- Children: 7, including Ruth Huntington Sessions

Frederic (or Frederick) Dan Huntington (May 28, 1819, in Hadley, Massachusetts – July 11, 1904, in Hadley, Massachusetts) was an American clergyman and the first Protestant Episcopal bishop of the Episcopal Diocese of Central New York.

== Early life, education and career ==
Frederic Dan, the youngest of the eleven children born to Dan and Elizabeth Huntington, was born in Hadley, Massachusetts on May 28, 1819. He grew up on the family farm "Forty Acres," the home of both his mother and his grandmother, Elizabeth Porter Phelps.

He graduated at Amherst College in 1839 and at the Harvard Divinity School in 1842. In 1843 he married Hannah Sargent, the sister of Epes Sargent. From 1842 to 1855 he was pastor of the South Congregational Church of Boston, and in 1855-1860 as preacher to the university and Plummer professor of Christian Morals at Harvard; he then left the Unitarian Church, with which his father had been connected as a clergyman at Hadley, resigned his professorship and became rector of the newly established Emmanuel Church of Boston.

=== Syracuse, New York ===
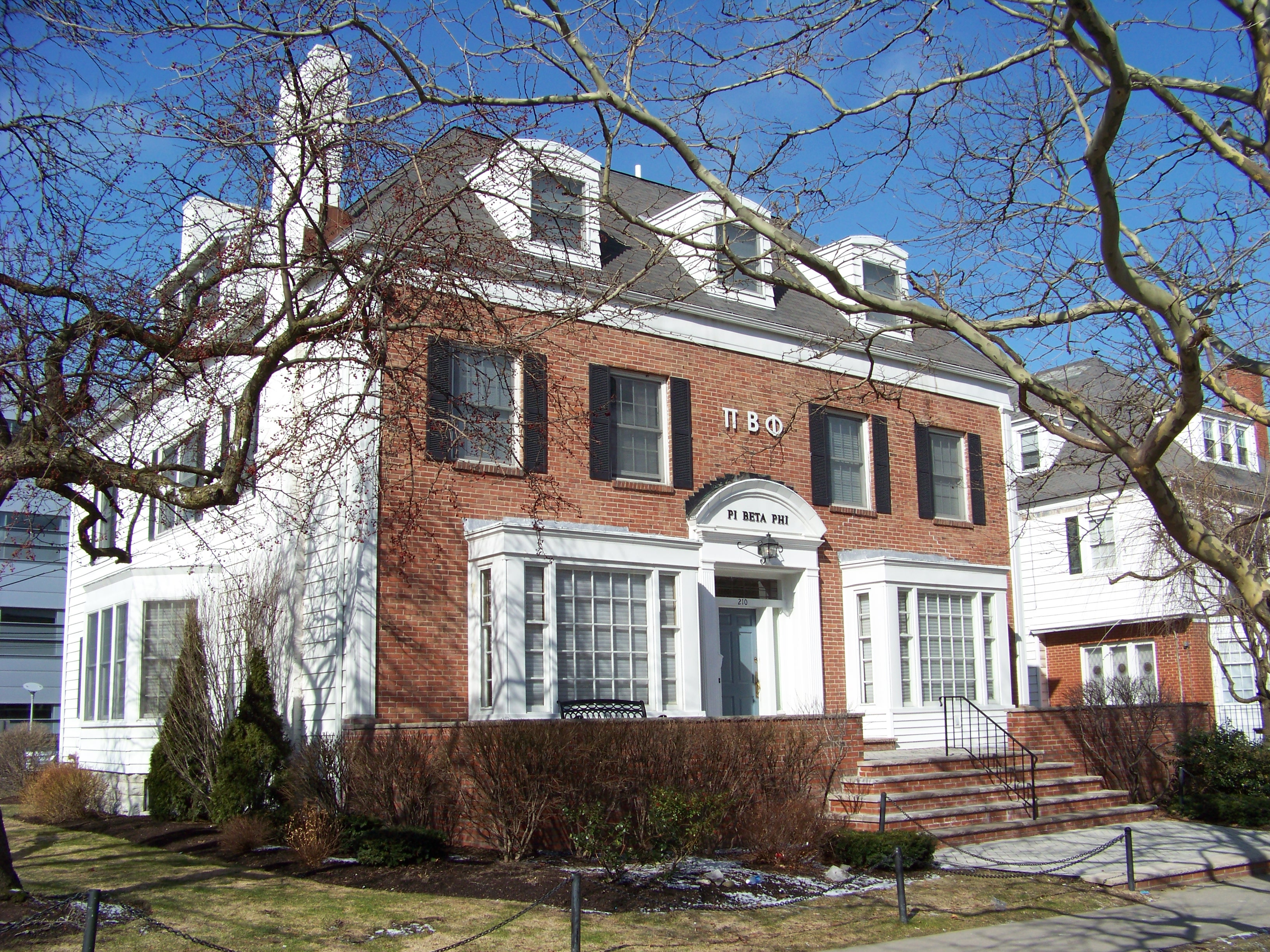
Huntington built his home in 1897 at 210 Walnut Place, Walnut Park Historic District on Syracuse University campus.

Rev. Huntington founded the St. John's School, a military school, in 1869 in Manlius, New York, and was its president until his death in 1904. In the 1920s, St. John's became known as the renowned military school, The Manlius School, today integrated into the Manlius Pebble Hill School.

He had refused the bishopric of the Episcopal Diocese of Maine when, in 1868, he was elected to the Diocese of Central New York. He was consecrated on April 9, 1869, and thereafter lived in Syracuse, New York.

He was the first president of the Church Association for the Advancement of the Interests of Labor.

=== Consecrators ===
- The Most Reverend Benjamin B. Smith
- The Right Reverend Manton Eastburn
- The Right Reverend Horatio Potter

N.B.: 93rd bishop consecrated in the Episcopal Church.

== End of life ==
Huntington remained throughout his life attached to the family's ancestral farm in Hadley, Massachusetts, in the 1860s purchasing his siblings' shares so that he could inherit the house. He continued to manage it as a working farm, and spent summers there throughout his life. Huntington died in Hadley on July 11, 1904, aged 85.

== Publications ==
His more important publications included:

- Lectures on Human Society (1860)
- Memorials of a Quiet Life (1874)
- The Golden Rule applied to Business and Social Conditions (1892)

From 1845 to 1858 he was the editor of The Monthly Religious Magazine, a Unitarian review.

== Legacy ==
Huntington's ancestral family home, the Porter-Phelps-Huntington House in Hadley, became a historic house museum in the 1940s, and is open seasonally. His daughter Ruth Huntington Sessions wrote a memoir, Sixty Odd (1936), which includes details about her childhood with Huntington.

Syracuse University School of Education's home is called Huntington Hall, formerly the Hospital of the Good Shepherd. Among the 20 oldest hospitals in the United States, the Hospital of the Good Shepherd was founded in 1872 under Bishop Huntington. As a teaching hospital, it was the first in the United States to offer nursing education, along with Johns Hopkins, in 1885.

In 1915, the hospital was purchased by Syracuse University to be a part of its College of Medicine. In 1965, patients of the now University Hospital of the Good Shepherd were transferred to the State University Upstate Medical Center Hospital (now Upstate Medical University). The former Good Shepherd hospital building was then converted to academic use and re-named for the hospital's founder.

== See also ==
- Historical list of bishops of the Episcopal Church in the United States of America

Episcopal Church (USA) titles
Preceded by n/a	Bishop of Central New York; 1869 – 1904	Succeeded by Charles Tyler Olmstead
