= Forty Acres and Its Skirts Historic District =

Historic district in Massachusetts, United States

- U.S. National Register of Historic Places
- U.S. Historic district
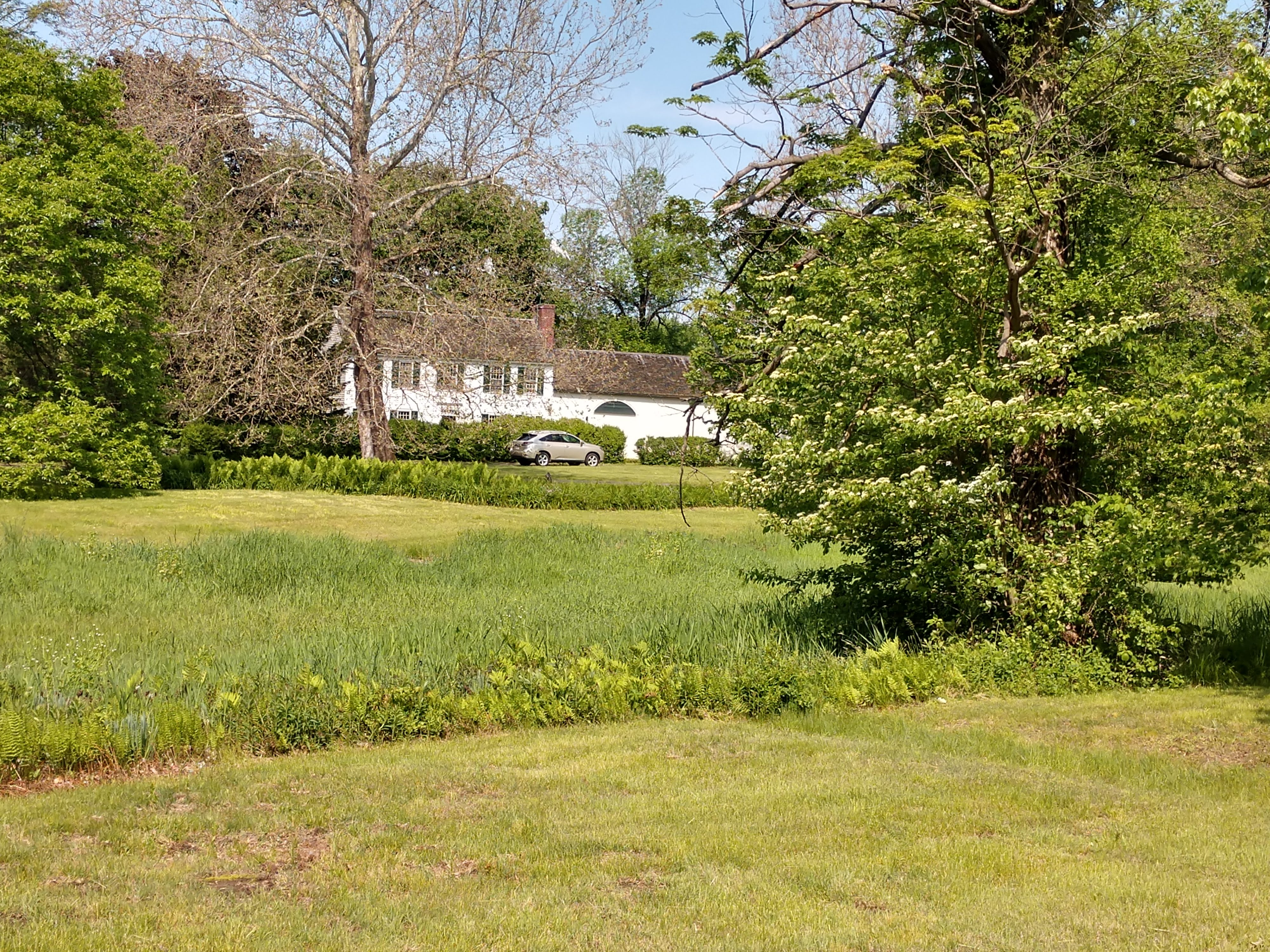
- The caretaker's house at Porter-Phelps-Huntington House

- Location within Massachusetts Location within the United States
- Location: 113-115, 123, 130 River Dr., Hadley, Massachusetts
- Coordinates: 42°22′8″N 72°35′7″W
- Area: 114 acres (46 ha)
- Architectural style: Federal, Colonial
- NRHP reference No.: 100008956
- Added to NRHP: May 4, 2023

The Forty Acres and Its Skirts Historic District is a rural historic district along the Connecticut River in Hadley, Massachusetts. Located north of the town center on River Road, the district is a rural landscape with a well-documented history of settlement and usage from the mid-18th century into the 20th century. It includes the Porter-Phelps-Huntington House and adjacent properties, which have been home to a succession of prominent local families. The district was listed on the National Register of Historic Places in 2023.

== Description and history ==
"Forty Acres" is a name given in the 17th century to a tract of land lying north of the village center of Hadley, located between the Connecticut River and Mount Warner, a prominent local hill. The "skirts" of the property referred to the outlying uplands of the property near the mountain. The Forty Acres name persisted, and in 1752 was applied to the house built by Moses Porter which is now known as the Porter-Phelps-Huntington House. The district also includes the Phelps Farm, located on the east side of River Drive, which was established in 1816 and retains a significant number of 19th-century outbuildings, and the 1927 Sessions House, built on the Phelps Farm property.

The history of this district is richly attested by detailed family records now archived at the University of Massachusetts, Amherst. Included in the records are the use of slave labor in the development of the Porter-Phelps-Huntington House in the 18th century, as well as the important role the women of the owning families played in the development and management of the farms. The Porter-Phelps-Huntington House is now a historic house museum that preserves family objects and artifacts and interprets the history of the area.

== See also ==
- National Register of Historic Places listings in Hampshire County, Massachusetts
