= Robert Campbell (bishop) =

Robert Erskine Campbell (August 13, 1884 in Florida, Orange County, New York– August 23, 1977) was bishop of the Episcopal Diocese of Liberia, serving from 1925 to 1936. A monk of the Order of the Holy Cross, he was consecrated on November 30, 1925. He also served as superior of the Order of the Holy Cross from 1948 to 1954.
