= Order of the Holy Cross =

Anglican religious order

The Order of the Holy Cross is an international Anglican monastic order that follows the Rule of St. Benedict.

== History ==
The order was founded in 1884 by the Rev. James Huntington, an Episcopal priest, in New York City. The order moved to Maryland briefly before settling in West Park, New York, in 1902.

== Houses ==
As of 2018 the Order of the Holy Cross maintained five houses:

- Holy Cross Monastery, West Park, New York
- St. Benedict's Priory, Volmoed, South Africa
- Mariya uMama weThemba Monastery, in Grahamstown, South Africa (closed August 2019).
- Mount Calvary Retreat House and Monastery, Santa Barbara, California (closed c. 2019)
- Holy Cross Priory, Toronto, Ontario (closed 2024)

The Mariya uMama weThemba Monastery, in Grahamstown, was closed in August 2019, although Holy Cross School, a work of the Order of the Holy Cross, is still active on the site outside Grahamstown.

Mount Calvary House, located in the hills high above Santa Barbara since 1947, burned to the ground in a wildfire on 14 November 2008. The community relocated to a site near the city center. In July 2019 the Order announced that Mount Calvary House, the smallest of the four houses, would close and the three brothers still resident relocated to other houses.

== Ministries ==
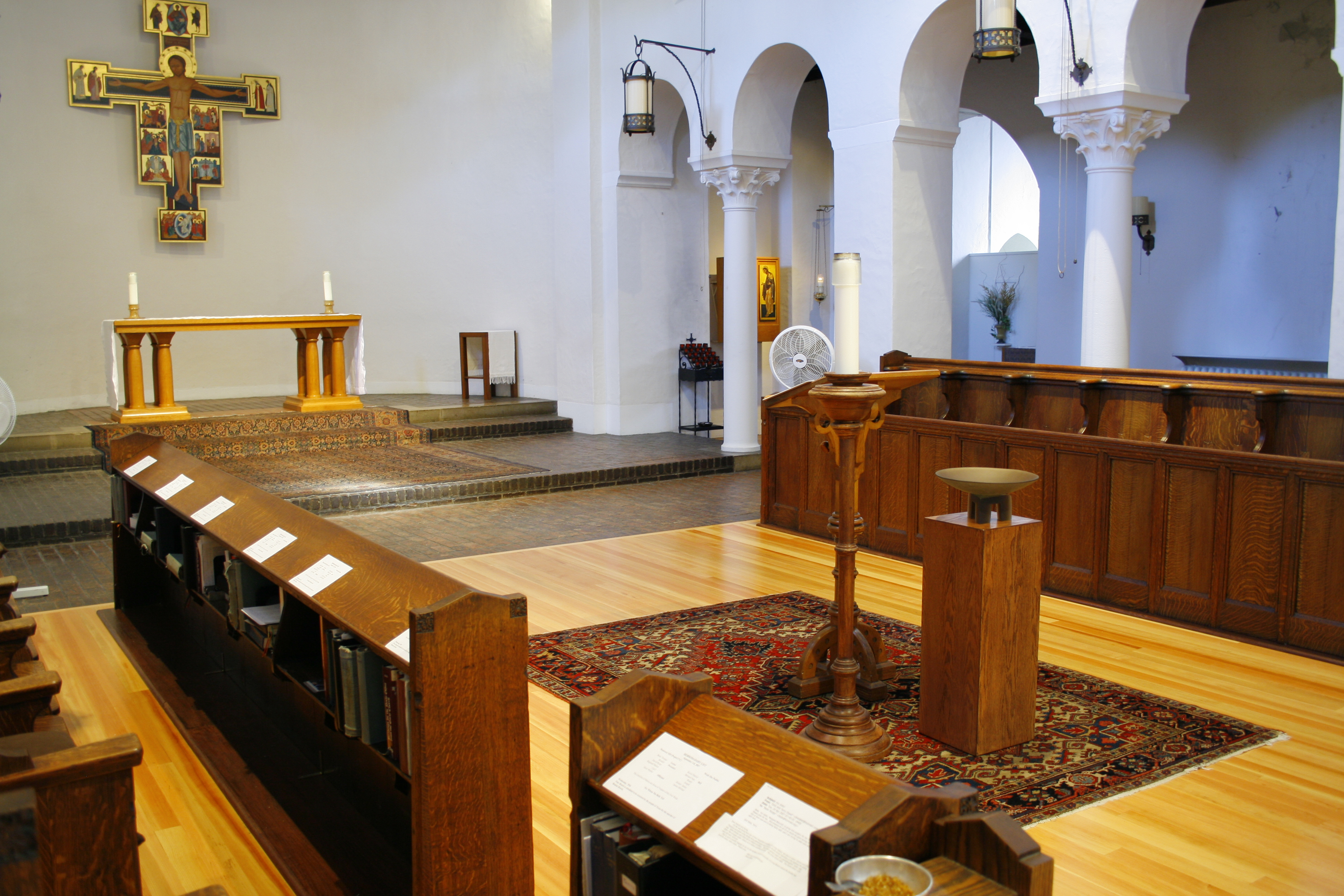
Monastic Church of St. Augustine at Holy Cross Monastery, West Park, New York

The monks of the order engage in various ministries, the chief being that of prayer (including the Divine Office and daily Mass), as well as hosting guests for individual and group retreats. The order estimates that more than 5,000 guests stay at Holy Cross Monastery, one of the largest monastic retreat centers in the Episcopal Church, each year. Holy Cross Monastery also makes and sells incense and religious literature. Holy Cross Priory in Toronto is an urban expression of the Benedictine life where, besides the offices and Eucharist, monks are actively involved in the work of the local church. Some members of the order engage in occupations such as being therapists or parish priests. All monasteries of the order offer spiritual direction and counsel.

== Vows ==
Monks of the order follow a threefold vow of obedience, stability, and conversion to the monastic way of life. In general, monks of the order are encouraged to develop their own ministries within their monastic vocation. They undergo periods of discernment and formation when entering the Order. The daily life of the monastery revolves around a balance of prayer, work, study, and rest.

== Associates ==
Lay people and diocesan clergy (male and female) may join the Associates of Holy Cross. According to the associates' website, members "intend to love and serve God through a relationship with the Order of the Holy Cross (Anglican), adapting to their lives the Benedictine principles on which the monks base their common life." Associates live under a rule of life developed with the help of a spiritual director and have an ongoing relationship with the order. Associates are entitled to use the post-nominal initials AHC. Notable associates include bishops Nathan D. Baxter, Brian Lee Cole, and Robert W. Ihloff.

== Holy Cross Publishing ==
The order is known for its publishing of the Anglo-Catholic devotional guide Saint Augustine's Prayer Book in 1949. The order also co-published, with the sisters of the Order of St. Helena, A Monastic Breviary, which succeeded A Four Office Breviary.

In 1957 the order published Within the Green Wall: The Story of Holy Cross Liberia Mission 1922-1957 by the Rt. Rev. Robert Campbell, O.H.C. The book provides a detailed account of the Order of the Holy Cross's missionary efforts in Liberia.

== Personnel ==
Br. Robert Magliula, OHC, is the current superior of the order. The Rt. Rev. Mark Sisk is bishop visitor and the Rt Rev. Ann Tottenham is deputy bishop visitor.

== See also ==
- Robert E. Campbell
