= Ned Cole =

American bishop

The Right Reverend Ned Cole D.D.
- Bishop of Central New York
- Church: Episcopal Church
- Diocese: Central New York
- In office: 1969–1983
- Predecessor: Walter M. Higley
- Successor: O'Kelley Whitaker
- Previous post: Coadjutor Bishop of Central New York (1964-1969)

Orders
- Ordination: December 5, 1948 by William Scarlett
- Consecration: April 5, 1964 by Arthur C. Lichtenberger

Personal details
- Born: February 6, 1917 California, Missouri, United States
- Died: December 16, 2002 (aged 85) Syracuse, New York, United States
- Denomination: Anglican
- Parents: Ned Cole & Gladys Walser
- Spouse: Martha Murphy Tottey
- Children: 4

Ned C. Cole Jr. (February 6, 1917 – December 16, 2002) was bishop of the Episcopal Diocese of Central New York from 1969 to 1983, having previously been coadjutor bishop since 1963.

== Biography ==
Cole was born in California, Missouri on February 6, 1917, the son of Edward Raymond "Ned" Cole, Sr. (1895-1955) and Gladys Walser (1894-1982). He graduated with a Bachelor of Arts degree from Westminster College in Fulton, Missouri in 1939. Then he studied at the University of Missouri School of Law from which he graduated in 1940. Between 1940 and 1942 he was the secretary to Secretary of State of Missouri. Later he studied at the Episcopal Divinity School in Cambridge, Massachusetts from which he graduated with a Bachelor of Theology in 1948, and was awarded an honorary Doctor of Divinity from Westminster College in 1957.

Cole was ordained deacon in June 1948 and priest that same year on December 5 at Calvary Church in Columbia, Missouri by Bishop William Scarlett of Missouri. He served as curate of Calvary Church in Columbia, Missouri between 1948 and 1949. Later, he became rector of Grace Church in Jefferson City, Missouri and vicar of St Mark's Church in Portland, Missouri. In 1956 he was appointed Dean of Christ Church Cathedral in St. Louis in 1956. He also served as a member of the general board of the National Council of Churches between 1963 and 1966 and a member of the legislative commission of the New York Council of Churches between 1964 and 1967 and acted as president between 1980 and 1983.

Cole was elected Coadjutor Bishop of Central New York on November 22, 1963, on the fifth ballot, during a special convention that took place between November 21 and 22. He was consecrated on April 5, 1964, in Saint Paul's Cathedral in Syracuse, New York by Presiding Bishop Arthur C. Lichtenberger. He succeeded as diocesan on February 1, 1969, and retained the post till his retirement in 1983. As a bishop he was vocal in support for the ordination of women to the priesthood. He died in Syracuse, New York on December 16, 2002.
