= Holy Cross Monastery (West Park, New York) =

Anglican religious order in New York, US

- U.S. National Register of Historic Places
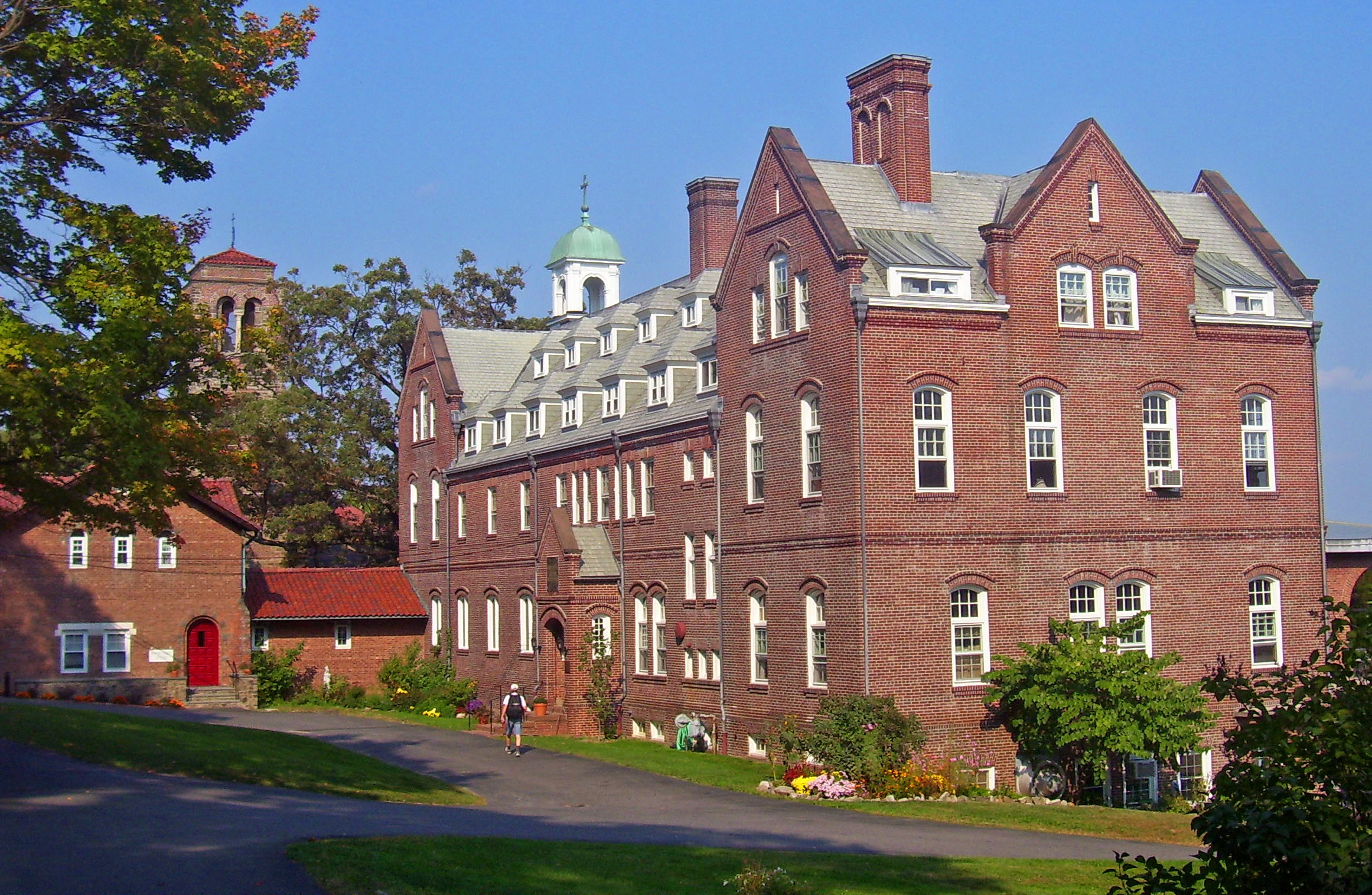
- Rear of monastery from parking lot in 2007
- Location: West Park, New York
- Nearest city: Poughkeepsie
- Coordinates: 41°48′11″N 73°57′26″W
- Area: 26 acres (11 ha)
- Built: 1904
- Architects: Ralph Adams Cram, Henry Vaughan
- Architectural style: Mission/Spanish Revival, Tudor Revival
- NRHP reference No.: 95000045
- Added to NRHP: February 24, 1995

Holy Cross Monastery is located on US 9W in West Park, New York, United States. It is the mother house of the Order of the Holy Cross, an Anglican religious order inspired by the Benedictine tradition.

The building, designed in a combination of Mission/Spanish Revival and Tudorbethan styles by architects Ralph Adams Cram and Henry Vaughan, both known for their religious buildings, began construction in 1902 and was dedicated two years later. It sits on a 26-acre (11 ha) site overlooking the Hudson River and the Vanderbilt Mansion National Historic Site, which is just across from it in Hyde Park. The monastery dominates the view westward from the mansion grounds.

In addition to the motherhouse, facilities include two guesthouses, the Monastic Church of St. Augustine, and the Monastic Enclosure. It is available for individual and group retreats. Madeleine L'Engle, author of A Wrinkle in Time, ran a retreat in conjunction with a writers' workshop every January for much of her life. The monks also sell incense, perfume and operate the Monk's Cell, a book and gift shop on the property. In keeping with the order's devotion to progressive social causes, they kept a peace vigil on Saturdays during the Iraq War.

It was the first house established in the order by its founder, The Rev. James Otis Sargent Huntington. It was created 20 years after he founded The Order of the Holy Cross, after the order used interim homes in New York City and Maryland. He is buried in the church on the grounds. Today it serves as the order's house of formation, where new initiates begin their training. It was added to the National Register of Historic Places in 1995.
