= Charles Tyler Olmstead =

American bishop (1842–1924)

The Right Reverend Charles Tyler Olmstead D.D., D.C.L., LL.D.
- Bishop of Central New York
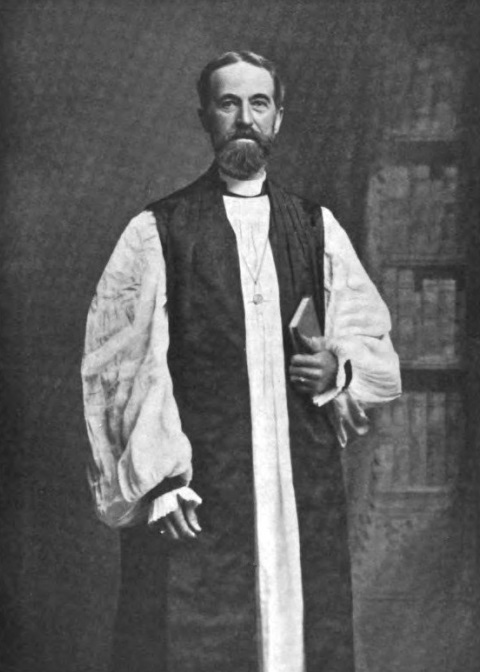
- Church: Episcopal Church
- Diocese: Central New York
- In office: 1904–1924
- Predecessor: Frederic Dan Huntington
- Successor: Charles Fiske
- Previous post: Coadjutor Bishop of Central New York (1902-1904)

Orders
- Ordination: December 13, 1868 by Horatio Potter
- Consecration: October 2, 1902 by Frederic Dan Huntington

Personal details
- Born: April 28, 1842 Cohoes, New York, United States
- Died: March 26, 1924 (aged 81) Utica, New York, United States
- Denomination: Anglican
- Parents: Charles A. Olmsted & Ardelia Wilkinson
- Spouse: Catharine Lawrence (m. Apr. 25, 1876)
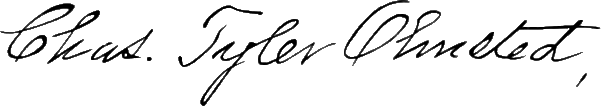
- Signature

Charles Tyler Olmstead (April 28, 1842 – March 26, 1924) was bishop of the Episcopal Diocese of Central New York from 1904 to 1924.

== Early life ==
Charles Tyler Olmstead was born in Cohoes, New York on April 28, 1842. His parents were Charles Augustus Olmsted (1811–1885) and Ardelia (Wilkinson) Olmsted (1811–1888). (Note: The surname has been spelled both as "Olmsted" and "Olmstead." This difference in spelling is reflected in the various references used in this article. However, this article always uses the Olmstead spelling because that is the spelling used by the Diocese of Central New York on its website's listing of the Bishops of Central New York.)

In 1852, when the boy was ten years old, the family moved to Newport, Kentucky. Four years later, he began to work with his father in building the Louisville and Nashville Railroad. While working on the railroad, he "continued his studies." In 1853, he started attending the Brooks' Classical School located in Cincinnati, across the Ohio River from Newport. He studied there three and one-half years in preparation for college. Therefore, when the family moved back to New York state, settling in Lockport, he was ready to enter college. However, because of his father's financial condition, Olmstead could not enter college until 1862.

== Education and teaching ==
In 1862, Olmstead entered the sophomore class at Trinity College, Hartford, Conn., an Episcopal Church school. He graduated with a Bachelor of Arts in 1865 and with a Master of Arts in 1868.

Olmstead enrolled in the Berkeley Divinity School in Middletown, Connecticut. While a student in the Berkeley Divinity School, Olmstead also tutored Latin and Greek at St. Stephen's College at Annandale during the academic year 1865–66. During the next academic year (1866–68), he taught "mathematics and natural philosophy" at St. Stephen's.

== Ministry as a priest ==
In 1867, Olmstead was made a deacon, and in 1868 he was ordained to the priesthood.

In November 1868, Olmstead was called to be an assistant minister in the Trinity Chapel of Trinity Church, New York City. While in this position, he married Catharine Lawrence (1838–1914), daughter of Joseph and Rosette (Townsend) Lawrence of New York city, on April 25, 1876. He stayed in that position until May 1884, when he became rector of Grace Church in Utica, New York.

Grace Church, under Olmstead's leadership, "prospered greatly, both in spiritual and material matters." The buildings were improved.

Olmstead was a founder of the Utica Clerical Union. He had a hand in forming the Central New York Choir Guild. He served as chaplain of the Good Shepherd, St. Luke's Hospital, and the Guild of St. Barnabas for Nurses. He also organized the Ladies Aid Society, the Girls' Friendly Society, the Employment Society, the Boys Friendly Society, the Senior and Junior Brotherhood of St. Andrew. In 1893, Olmstead became a trustee of St. John's Military School in Manlius, N. Y.

During his tenure as Rector of Grace Church, Olmstead was elected as a deputy to the 1892, 1895 and 1898 General Conventions of the Episcopal Church.

In April 1899, Olmstead returned to Trinity Parish, New York. This time it was as Vicar of St. Agnes' Chapel on West 92nd Street. At that time, St. Agnes included the Trinity School. Olmstead was qualified to be in charge of the school because of his experience in teaching at St. Stephens' College. During his time at St. Agnes, both the church and the school grew.

== Ministry as a bishop ==
In October 1902, Olmstead was elected bishop coadjutor of the Diocese of Central New York. He was consecrated in Grace church, Utica, N.Y. on October 2, 1902. His consecrators were Bishops Frederic Dan Huntington of Syracuse, Henry C. Potter of New York, and William David Walker of Western New York. Immediately after his consecration, Olmstead began his duties as coadjutor to Bishop Huntington. Huntington had been unable to perform all of his duties because of his "advanced age."

A newspaper editorial about the election of Olmstead as Bishop Coadjutor praised him as "a man of brilliant scholarship and great activity" and as "a speaker of original and convincing power." Also, as "a man of strong convictions," but "nevertheless, a man of kindly disposition and sympathetic." Regarding his fitness for his new duties, the editorial said that "he has the executive ability to perform" them.

Olmstead was a bishop in Diocese of Central New York for twenty-two years: as bishop coadjutor from 1902 to 1904 and as bishop diocesan from 1904 to his death in 1924.

In 1903, on Washington's birthday, Olmstead, while bishop coadjutor, addressed the 1903 banquet of the Board of Managers of the Sons of the Revolution in the State of New York. Bishop Dan Huntington died in July 1904, leaving Olmstead his successor as diocesan bishop.

A newspaper story dated October 13, 1905, was headlined "Bishop Olmstead Asks Clergymen of the Episcopal to Do All in Their Power to Keep Ladies from Showing Their Beautiful Hair." Olmstead was quoted as saying, "Let at least this good custom of the mothers of Israel prevail, that they pray in public with covered heads."

In 1906, at the thirty-eighth annual convention of the Diocese of Central New York, in the Bishop's Address, Olmstead said,

The Church Of Jesus Christ should not be in alliance either with individuals or with corporations whose principles and methods are known to be illegal and corrupt. All the talk about "tainted money" seems to me to be beside the mark. Money itself, I suppose, cannot be tainted, but it may at times represent a tainted partnership, and it is not well for the Church to have her tongue tied by any such coalition, because it is her duty to be ready to denounce wickedness in high places as well as in low places. The Church can never gain by getting wealth which paralyzes her proper functions.

On October 8, 1907, Olmstead spoke to the triennial meeting of the Episcopal Church's Church Periodical Club. The newspaper account characterized him as a speaker "with decided ability."

On June 2, 1921, following the advice of his Standing Committee regarding irreconcilable differences between a rector and his vestry, Olmstead signed this order: "I hereby render my decision, that in accordance with the above report, the Rev. Arthur H. Beaty, resign the rectorship of Grace Church, Cortland, N. Y."

== Awards and memberships ==
In 1893, Hobart College gave Olmstead the degree of Doctor of Divinity. In 1903, Syracuse University conferred the degree of Doctor of Canon Law. In 1908, Hamilton College (New York) awarded him the degree of Doctor of Laws.

Olmstead was a member of the Oneida Historical Society.

== Ill health and death ==
On January 31, 1914, Mrs. Olmstead died. After that his niece lived with him until he died.

In the early part of 1924, Olmstead's health became so bad that he had to turn over most of his duties to his coadjutor Bishop Charles Fiske. On March 26, 1924, he "died suddenly of heart disease" at his home in Utica. He had been bishop for twenty-two years.

== Tributes ==
After Olmstead's death, some of his associates wrote tributes about him. They included these words:

He was just but he was always kind and sympathetic; wrong he hated and would denounce without fear, but the right he always upheld.
Diligent and conscientious, he sought to serve rather than to shine. He was a wise teacher and taught by example as much as by precept.
