= Charles Fiske =

American Episcopal bishop

The Right Reverend Charles Fiske D.D., S.T.D., LL.D.
- Bishop of Central New York
- Church: Episcopal Church
- Diocese: Central New York
- In office: 1921–1936
- Predecessor: Charles Tyler Olmstead
- Successor: Edward H. Coley
- Previous post: Coadjutor Bishop of Central New York (1915-1924)

Orders
- Ordination: June 11, 1897 by John Scarborough
- Consecration: September 29, 1915 by Daniel S. Tuttle

Personal details
- Born: March 16, 1868 New Brunswick, New Jersey, United States
- Died: January 8, 1942 (aged 73) Baltimore, Maryland United States
- Buried: Trinity Church Cemetery
- Denomination: Anglican
- Parents: William H. Fiske & Mary Houghton
- Spouse: Elizabeth Curlett Crampton
- Children: John Francis Fiske (1904-1988); (Stepdaughter) Esther Barton Crampton (ca.1890-197?)

Charles Fiske (March 16, 1868 - January 8, 1942) was bishop of the Episcopal Diocese of Central New York from 1921 to 1936.

== Biography ==
Fiske was born on March 16, 1869, in New Brunswick, New Jersey, the son of William Henry Fiske (1845-1916) and Mary Houghton. he was educated at the schools in new Brunswick and studied at Rutgers College. he then joined his father's newspaper staff, whilst being registered as a law student. He also worked as a correspondent for The New York Times and later also was private secretary to Stewart L. Woodford who was Lieutenant Governor of New York. Later he studied at St Stephen's College and then at General Theological Seminary from where he graduated in 1896 and was ordained deacon that same year by Bishop John Scarborough of New Jersey. He was ordained priest in 1897.

As a priest he became a member of the New Jersey associate missions and then served congregations in Westfield, New Jersey, Somerville, New Jersey, the Church of the Transfiguration in Philadelphia, St John's Church in Norristown, Pennsylvania and finally as rector of the Church of St Michael and All Angels in Baltimore.

In 1915 Fiske was elected Bishop Coadjutor of Central New York and was consecrated on September 29, 1915, with Presiding Bishop Daniel S. Tuttle as chief consecrator. He became diocesan bishop in 1924 and retired in 1936. he died on January 8, 1942, in Baltimore and his funeral was held at st Michael and All Angeles Church in Baltimore on January 10, presided over by Bishop Edward T. Helfenstein.
