= Edward H. Coley =

American bishop

The Right Reverend Edward Huntington Coley D.D., S.T.D.
- Bishop of Central New York
- Church: Episcopal Church
- Diocese: Central New York
- Elected: May 6, 1936
- In office: 1936–1942
- Predecessor: Charles Fiske
- Successor: Malcolm E. Peabody
- Previous post: Suffragan Bishop of Central New York (1924-1936)

Orders
- Ordination: 1888 by John Williams
- Consecration: October 7, 1924 by Ethelbert Talbot

Personal details
- Born: August 22, 1861 Westville, Connecticut, United States
- Died: June 6, 1949 (aged 87) Utica, New York United States
- Buried: Willowbrook Cemetery
- Denomination: Anglican
- Parents: James Edward Coley & Mary Gray Huntington
- Spouse: Julia Seely Covell
- Children: 3

Edward Huntington Coley (August 22, 1861 - June 6, 1949) was bishop of the Episcopal Diocese of Central New York, serving from 1936 to 1942.

== Biography ==
Coley was born on August 22, 1861, in Westville, Connecticut, the son of James Edward Coley and Mary Gray Huntington. In 1884 he graduated with a Bachelor of Arts from Yale University while in 1887 he graduated in theology from Berkeley Division School. He was awarded a Doctor of Sacred Theology by Syracuse University in 1912, a Doctor of Divinity from Berkeley Divinity School in 1924 and another one from Hamilton College in 1942.

He was ordained deacon in 1887 and priest in 1888. First he served a curate of St John's Church in Stamford, Connecticut, between 1887 and 1888. In 1888 he became rector of Christ Church in Savannah, Georgia. A year later he became rector of St Mary's Church in South Manchester, Connecticut, where he remained till 1893. He then went back to St John's Church in Stamford, Connecticut, to serve as assistant rector. Between 1897 and 1924 he was rector of Calvary Church in Utica, New York.

Coley was elected Suffragan Bishop of Central New York on May 14, 1924, and was consecrated on October 7, 1924, by Presiding Bishop Ethelbert Talbot. On May 6, 1936, he was elected Bishop of Central New York. He retired on July 1, 1942.
