= Gladstone B. Adams III =

American Episcopal bishop (born 1952)

The Right Reverend Gladstone B. Adams III M.Div.
- Provisional Bishop of South Carolina
- Church: Episcopal Church
- Diocese: South Carolina
- Elected: September 10, 2016
- In office: 2016–2019
- Previous post: Bishop of Central New York (2001–2016)

Orders
- Ordination: 1980
- Consecration: October 27, 2001 by Jack Marston McKelvey

Personal details
- Born: July 26, 1952 (age 73) Baltimore, Maryland, United States
- Denomination: Anglican
- Spouse: Bonnie
- Children: 3

Gladstone Bailey "Skip" Adams III (born July 26, 1952, in Baltimore, Maryland) is an American Episcopal bishop. Between 2016 and 2019, he served as the Provisional Bishop of the Episcopal Church in South Carolina. He previously served as Bishop of Central New York from 2001 to 2016.

== Ordained ministry ==
Adams was ordained as a priest in 1980 in the Diocese of Maryland. He then served as curate at St Peter's Church in Ellicott City, Maryland. In 1982, he became rector of St Paul's Church in Lancaster, New Hampshire. He then became rector of St Thomas' Church in Chesapeake, Virginia. In 1994, he became rector of St James' Church in Skaneateles, New York. On June 1, 2001, Adams was elected the tenth bishop of the Diocese of Central New York. He is the 972nd bishop to be consecrated in The Episcopal Church. He officially retired from that position on October 31, 2016.

In June 2016, Adams was nominated as the next provisional bishop of the Episcopal Church in South Carolina. On September 10, 2016, he was officially elected and installed as provisional bishop. He retired from that position in December 2019.

From 2021 to 2022, Adams served as Assisting Bishop on an interim basis for the Dioceses of Western Michigan and Eastern Michigan. He resumed that role after the resignation of Prince Singh in 2023.

== See also ==
- List of Episcopal bishops of the United States
- Historical list of the Episcopal bishops of the United States
