= Episcopal Diocese of Central New York =

Episcopal Church diocese in the US

Coordinates: 43°6′0.8″N 76°10′56.6″W

Diocese of Central New York
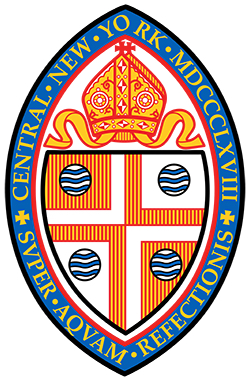
- Seal of the Episcopal Diocese of Central New York State, USA

Location
- Country: United States
- Territory: Counties of Broome, Cayuga, Chemung, Chenango, Cortland, Jefferson, Lewis, Madison, Oneida, Onondaga, Oswego, Seneca, Tioga, and Tompkins, New York
- Ecclesiastical province: Province 2

Statistics
- Population: Total: (as of 2023); 8,534
- Parishes: 78 (2024)

Information
- Denomination: Episcopal Church
- Established: November 10, 1868
- Cathedral: Saint Paul's Cathedral

Current leadership
- Bishop: DeDe Duncan-Probe

Map
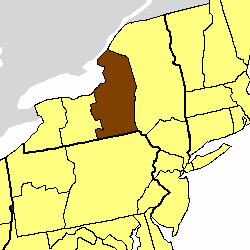
- Location of the Diocese of Central New York

Website
- Website of the Diocese

The Episcopal Diocese of Central New York is a diocese of the Episcopal Church in the United States of America that comprises 14 counties in Central New York. It is one of ten dioceses, plus the Convocation of Episcopal Churches in Europe, that make up Province 2 of the Episcopal Church in the United States of America.

The diocesan bishop is DeDe Duncan-Probe, eleventh bishop of Central New York, and the diocese's first female bishop. Youth ministry includes C.A.R.E. which makes mission trips.

The diocese has also facilitated Mission of Miracles, an annual volunteer medical mission trip to the Diocese of El Salvador, with which the diocese has a long-standing companion relationship.

The diocese reported 21,000 members in 2003 and 8,534 members in 2023; no membership statistics were reported in 2024 national parochial reports. Plate and pledge income for the 78 filing congregations of the diocese in 2024 was $6,806,763. Average Sunday attendance (ASA) for 2024 was 2,377 persons. This was a relative decrease from 3,825 ASA in 2015.

== List of bishops ==
Bishops of Central New York
| From | Until | Incumbent | Notes |
|---|---|---|---|
| 1869 | 1904 | Frederic Dan Huntington | Died in office. |
| 1904 | 1924 | Charles Tyler Olmstead | (died March 29, 1924, aged 82); previously coadjutor since 1902; died in office. |
| 1924 | 1936 | Charles Fiske | (c. 1863–64, New Brunswick, New Jersey – January 8, 1942, Baltimore); previously coadjutor since 1915; retired. |
| 1936 | 1942 | Edward H. Coley | Edward Huntington Coley (August 22, 1861, Westfield, Connecticut – June 6, 1949, Utica, New York); previously suffragan since 1924; retired. |
| 1942 | 1960 | Malcolm E. Peabody | Malcolm Endicott Peabody (June 12, 1888, Danvers, Massachusetts – June 20, 1974); previously coadjutor since 1938; retired. Father of the Governor of Massachusetts Endicott Peabody. |
| 1960 | 1969 | Walter M. Higley | Walter Maydole Higley (January 23, 1899, New York City – May 11, 1969); previously suffragan since 1948; died shortly after retirement. |
| 1969 | 1983 | Ned Cole | previously coadjutor since 1963; retired. |
| 1983 | 1992 | O'Kelley Whitaker | (born December 26, 1926, Durham, North Carolina); previously coadjutor since 1981; retired to Southern Virginia. |
| 1992 | 2000 | David B. Joslin | David Bruce Joslin (born January 8, 1936); previously coadjutor since 1991; retired to New Jersey. |
| 2000 | 2001 | David Bowman, Assisting bishop | David C. Bowman (born November 15, 1932); retired from Western New York; assisting bishop during interregnum; moved to Ohio. |
| 2001 | 2016 | Gladstone B. Adams III | Gladstone Bailey "Skip" Adams III (born July 26, 1952); previously served at parishes in Maryland, New Hampshire, and Upstate New York; later served as provisional bishop in South Carolina and Michigan. |
| 2016 | present | DeDe Duncan-Probe | Previously served at parishes in Massachusetts, Virginia, etc. |
