= Elizabeth Porter Phelps =

American diarist (1747–1817)

Personal details
- Born: Elizabeth Porter; November 24, 1747 Hadley, Massachusetts
- Died: January 1, 1817 (aged 69) Hadley, Massachusetts
- Spouse: Charles Phelps Jr.
- Children: 3
- Parent(s): Moses Porter and Elizabeth Pitkin Porter

Elizabeth Porter Phelps (1747–1817) was a member of the eighteenth-century rural gentry in western Massachusetts; she is also recognized as an important diarist from late 18th century and early 19th century in Hadley, Massachusetts (USA).

== Biography ==
Elizabeth Porter was born in 1747. As a young child she moved with her parents to a large farm known as Forty Acres, located in Hadley, Massachusetts. Built in 1752 by Moses and Elizabeth Porter, this estate reflected the family's wealth and social standing. After Moses Porter died in 1755 during the Battle of Lake George (an episode during the French and Indian War), his widow Elizabeth Pitkin Porter, who never remarried, hired a series of managers to help run the large farm; she remained at the estate until her death in 1798.

Elizabeth Porter married estate manager Charles Phelps, Jr. on June 14, 1770 and continued to reside at Forty Acres. In 1772 Phelps gave birth to a son, Moses Porter Charles Phelps. In late 1776, Elizabeth gave birth to another son, Charles, only to lose him soon after (thought to be from a smallpox outbreak). In 1779, Elizabeth gave birth to a daughter, Elizabeth Whiting. After her daughter's marriage to Dan Huntington in 1801 and removal to Litchfield, Connecticut, the two women remained in contact with each other through a lively correspondence.

After Elizabeth Porter Phelps' death in 1817, her daughter Elizabeth Whiting Phelps "Betsy" Huntington moved into the house with her husband Dan Huntington. Betsy kept her own diary, and maintained correspondence with her 11 children. These materials are part of a large collection of family papers on deposit in the Amherst College Library, over 90 linear feet of archival material documenting the family's history over eight generations.

=== Diarist ===
The Elizabeth Porter Phelps diary is an important historical record that has been utilized by a number of historians, including Laurel Thatcher Ulrich, Catherine E. Kelly and Marla R. Miller. Over 54 years, sermons, social and house calls, medical care, errands, and other topics are recorded in her diary. Phelps records the names of visitors to the estate as well as the men and women who came to work at Forty Acres. The names of more than sixty women employed during the decades covered by Phelps' diary are preserved (one of these women--Hatfield, Massachusetts gownmaker Rebecca Dickinson—also left a diary kept during the same years as Phelps' record); Phelps also recorded the names of several male farmhands. She also records activities associated with the several enslaved men and women at the estate. During her forty-two years of marriage, Phelps supervised work on the farm, including spinning, the making and mending of clothes, the making of soap, candle-making, and so forth.

The record is especially valuable on the subject of needlework, an important part in the life of Elizabeth Porter Phelps. She spent a great deal of her social life as a young woman participating in quilting bees that cultivated social connections while allowing young women to show off her skills. Young women also received the opportunity to meet eligible men at festivities following quilting, forming connections with the relatives of the women who shared their status.

Most models of the "patriarchal family economy" ill fit the evidence of 18th century diaries, which describe a world in which wives as well as husbands traded with their neighbors, where young women felt themselves responsible for their own support, where matches were made in the tumult of neighborhood frolics, and where outsiders as well as family members were involved in the most intimate events of life.
