= James W. Montgomery =

American bishop (1921–2019)

The Right Reverend James W. Montgomery S.T.D.
- Bishop of Chicago
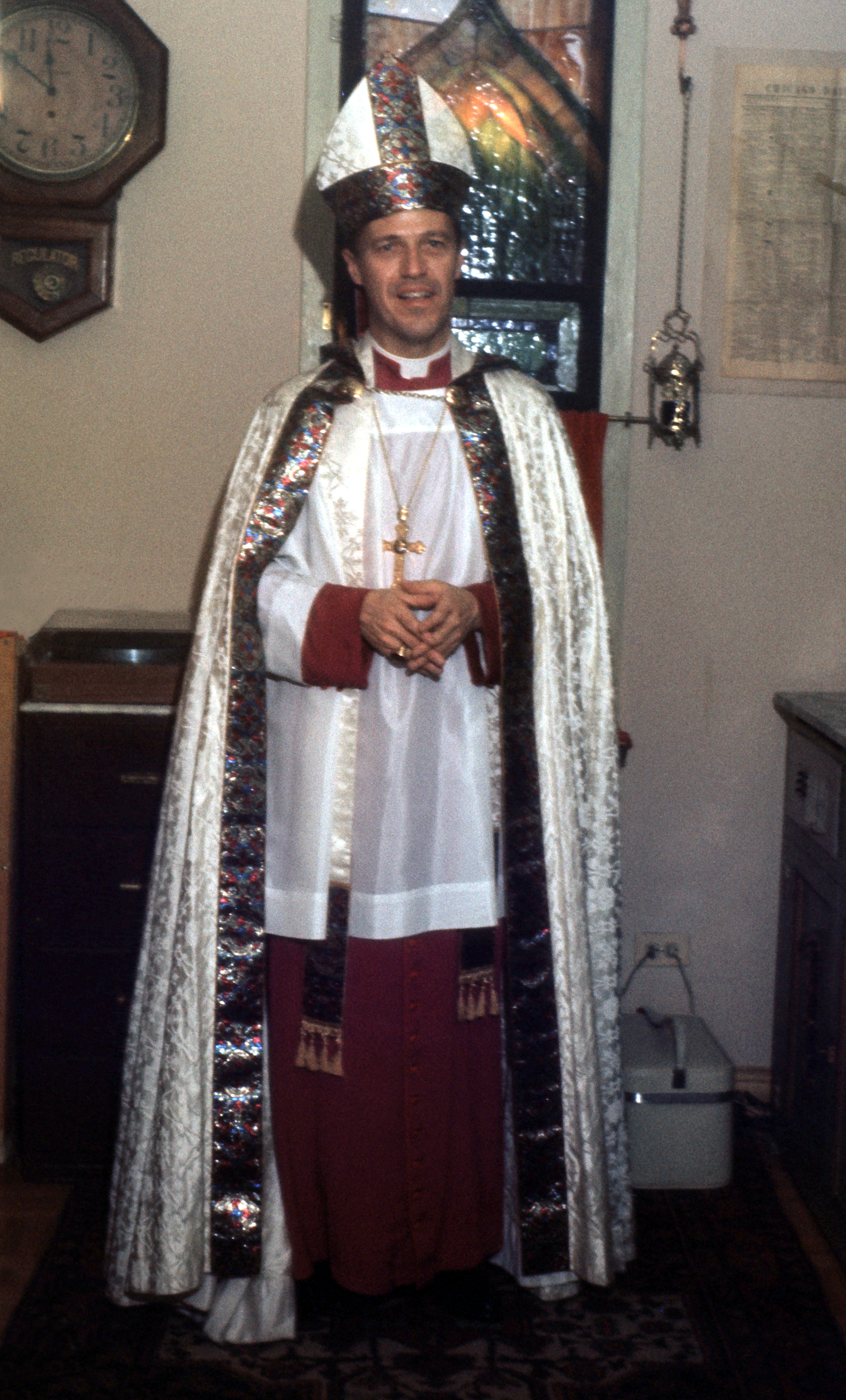
- James W. Montgomery in 1967
- Church: Episcopal Church
- Diocese: Chicago
- In office: 1971–1987
- Predecessor: Frank Burrill
- Successor: Frank Griswold
- Previous posts: Suffragan Bishop of Chicago (1962–1965); Coadjutor Bishop of Chicago (1965–1971)

Orders
- Ordination: December 1949 by Wallace E. Conkling
- Consecration: September 29, 1962 by Arthur C. Lichtenberger

Personal details
- Born: James Winchester Montgomery; May 29, 1921 Chicago, Illinois, United States
- Died: October 23, 2019 (aged 98) Chicago, Illinois, United States
- Denomination: Anglican
- Parents: James Edward Montgomery & Evelyn Lee Winchester

James Winchester Montgomery (May 29, 1921 – October 23, 2019) was an American bishop of the Episcopal Church in Chicago from 1971 to 1987. He served in the US Navy during World War II, before entering Seminary and serving the church in the Chicago area from 1949 to his retirement in 1987.

== Early life and education ==
Montgomery was born on May 29, 1921, in Chicago, Illinois, the son of James Edward Montgomery and Evelyn Lee Winchester. His maternal grandfather, James Rideout Winchester, was Bishop of Arkansas. Raised in the Rogers Park neighborhood, he graduated from Sullivan High School, then attended Northwestern University, graduating with a Bachelor of Arts in 1943.

During World War II, Montgomery served as a lieutenant in the US Navy. In 1946, he entered the General Theological Seminary, and earned a Bachelor of Sacred Theology in 1949. He received degrees of Doctor of Sacred Theology from his alma mater and Doctor of Divinity from Nashotah House in 1963. In 1969, he received an honorary Doctor of Divinity degree from Seabury-Western Theological Seminary, and an honorary Doctor of Laws from Shimer College.

== Ordination ==
Montgomery was ordained deacon on June 18, 1949, by Bishop Wallace E. Conkling of Chicago at the Church of St. Paul by the Lake in Chicago, near his parents' Rogers Park home. He was ordained a priest a few months later. Appointed as curate of St. Luke's Church in nearby Evanston, Illinois, Montgomery served two years, then accepted a position as rector of St. John the Evangelist Church in Flossmoor, Illinois, where he remained eleven years.

== Bishop ==
The Chicago diocesan convention of 1962 elected Montgomery, who served his entire career in Chicago, as Suffragan Bishop. Presiding Bishop Arthur C. Lichtenberger led the consecration service on September 29, 1962, at St James' Cathedral. On February 24, 1965, a special diocesan convention elected Montgomery Coadjutor Bishop of Chicago, and on October 2, 1971, he succeeded Frank Burrill as diocesan bishop. Montgomery did not support the ordination of women, which began in the Episcopal church during his tenure, but did allow for women to be ordained in the Chicago diocese by the bishop suffragan, Quintin E. Primo Jr. Bishop Montgomery served as a deputy to two General Conventions, as well as a trustee of the Church Pension Fund and navigated his diocese through significant liturgical revisions. He retired on October 1, 1987, and was succeeded by Bishop Frank Griswold.

During the period of the affiliation of Shimer College (now part of North Central College) with the Episcopal Church, Montgomery served as a trustee of the college. He also served as a trustee of Rush Presbyterian St. Luke's Hospital, and his alma maters (Nashotah House and General Theological Seminary), among other institutions.

== Death and legacy ==
Bishop Montgomery, age 98, died after a short illness at his Chicago home on October 23, 2019, with a funeral Eucharist at the cathedral on November 4, 2019. The community room of the historic Episcopal Church of the Atonement and Parish House, of which he was a longtime parishioner, is named in his honor.

Episcopal Church (USA) titles
Preceded by Frank Burrill	9th Bishop of Chicago; 1971–1987	Succeeded by Frank Griswold
