= George Craig Stewart =

American bishop

The Right Reverend George Craig Stewart S.T.D., D.D., L.H.D.
- Bishop of Chicago
- Church: Episcopal Church
- Diocese: Chicago
- Elected: May 13, 1930
- In office: 1930–1940
- Predecessor: Sheldon Munson Griswold
- Successor: Wallace E. Conkling
- Previous post: Coadjutor Bishop of Chicago (1930)

Orders
- Ordination: December 21, 1903 by Charles P. Anderson
- Consecration: June 18, 1930 by James De Wolf Perry

Personal details
- Born: August 2, 1879 Saginaw, Michigan, United States
- Died: May 2, 1940 (aged 60) Chicago, Illinois, United States
- Buried: St Luke's Church in Evanston, Illinois
- Denomination: Anglican (prev. Presbyterian)
- Parents: George Forbes Stewart & Katherine Craig
- Spouse: Mary Gertrude Clyde
- Children: 3

George Craig Stewart (August 18, 1879 – May 2, 1940) was the seventh bishop of the Episcopal Diocese of Chicago from 1930 to 1940. (The sixth Bishop of the Diocese of Chicago, Sheldon Munson Griswold (1861–1930), served for only a few months in 1930.)

== Biography ==
Stewart was born on August 18, 1879, in Saginaw, Michigan, the son of George Forbes Stewart (1842–1912) and Catherine Craig (1847–1880). He grew up as a Presbyterian but was later ordained as a minister in the Methodist Episcopal Church. After joining the Episcopal Church, he studied at Northwestern University and graduated in 1902. He was ordained deacon and priest in 1903 by Charles P. Anderson, Bishop of Chicago.

He served as in St Elizabeth's Church in Glencoe, Illinois from 1903 till 1904 when he transferred to St Luke's Church in Evanston, Illinois. During his time at St Luke's the parish managed to grow into the largest parish in the diocese.

On May 13, 1930, Stewart was elected Coadjutor Bishop of Chicago on the first ballot during a special convention held in St James' Cathedral in Chicago. He was consecrated bishop on June 18, 1930, in St Luke's Church, where he had served as rector since 1904. Presiding Bishop James De Wolf Perry was the chief consecrator. He succeeded as diocesan bishop in November of the same year after the death of Bishop Sheldon Munson Griswold. He remained Bishop of Chicago for ten years till his death on May 2, 1940.

Stewart married Mary Gertrude Clyde (1879-1960) in 1902 and together they had three children, two sons and a daughter. Their daughter, Katharine Craig Stewart, died at the age of fifteen as a result of the Spanish influenza on October 22, 1918.
