= Cathedral Shelter of Chicago =

The Cathedral Shelter of Chicago was founded in 1915. It began as a storefront mission of the Episcopal Diocese of Chicago, attached to the former Cathedral of Sts. Peter and Paul, providing food and clothing to the poor and homeless. In 1920, they began offering substance abuse treatment. Under the leadership of Father David Gibson, an Episcopal priest, the shelter was of great importance during the Great Depression.

Cathedral Shelter is a partner agency of Episcopal Charities and Community Services.

Cathedral Shelter is also a member of the West Side Collaborative, a partnership between local, non-profit organizations founded with the goal of improving the efficiency and effectiveness of the health services their clients receive.

== Recovery services ==
In 1953, Cathedral Shelter opened Higgins House, the state's first residential treatment facility for men recovering from addiction, and one of the first in the nation. The facility was named after the Rev. Joseph Higgins, who founded the recovery program in response to the growing number of alcoholics living in the neighborhood—which was then known as Chicago's "skid row". Since 1992, Cathedral Shelter has offered state-licensed Level I and Level II outpatient addiction treatment programs, providing counseling and case management services to those in need. Eligibility for services is limited to adult men and women who meet ASAM placement criteria for Level I or Level II outpatient treatment. Treatment is free of charge to individuals with no income or insurance, or provided on a sliding pay scale. In 2011, Higgins House transitioned all of its addiction recovery programming to the outpatient model.

Cressey House, a 28-apartment permanent supportive housing program for homeless individuals and single parents in recovery, opened its doors in 1998. It is among only a handful of supportive housing programs in the Midwest that permit homeless men and women in recovery to live with their children.

Cathedral Shelter also provides job readiness and placement services to its clients. Services include vocational and educational counseling; computer training; job search assistance; referrals to job training programs; and career readiness workshops in resume writing, interviewing, and workplace behavior. Outpatient clients and residents of Cressey House are encouraged to take advantage of these services.

Cathedral Shelter of Chicago's addiction treatment programs have been recognized as "Best of Chicago" by the U.S. Local Business Association in 2008, 2009, and 2010.

Addiction treatment programs are funded in whole or in part by the Illinois Department of Human Services Division of Alcoholism and Substance Abuse and by the City of Chicago Department of Public Health.

Cathedral Shelter is a Chicago Continuum of Care agency.

The Cathedral Shelter serves the poor of Chicago. Most are currently or formerly homeless and recovering from addiction. Many have also been incarcerated, typically on drug-related charges. In 2001 the organization was given a $75,000 grant by the state of Illinois to support its food delivery to the aged.

== Christmas Basket Program ==
For nearly a century, Cathedral Shelter's Christmas Basket Program has helped low-income families and individuals celebrate the holidays. In 2010, the Christmas Basket program provided 1,568 households with holiday presents—over 3,700 people received gifts.

== Second Chance Thrift Store ==
Second Chance Thrift, located at 1674 Ogden Avenue, is affiliated with Cathedral Shelter of Chicago. Proceeds support the mission of Cathedral Shelter.
