= William G. Burrill =

American Episcopal bishop (1934–2025)

The Right Reverend William George Burrill D.D.
- Bishop of Rochester
- Church: Episcopal Church
- Diocese: Rochester
- Elected: November 5, 1983
- In office: 1984–1999
- Predecessor: Robert R. Spears Jr.
- Successor: Jack Marston McKelvey
- Other post: Assistant Bishop of Arizona
- Previous post: Coadjutor Bishop of Rochester (1984)

Orders
- Ordination: 1959 by Charles L. Street
- Consecration: April 26, 1984 by John Allin

Personal details
- Born: April 17, 1934 New York City, U.S.
- Died: June 15, 2025 (aged 91)
- Denomination: Anglican
- Parents: Gerald Francis Burrill & Janet Burrill
- Spouse: Kay Clough (m. 1960; died 2010) Marilyn Carol Usher (m. 2013)
- Children: 4
- Education: Sewanee: The University of the South

William George Burrill (April 17, 1934 – June 15, 2025) was an American Episcopalian bishop. He was the sixth bishop of the Episcopal Diocese of Rochester, serving from 1984 to 1999.

== Early life and education ==
Burrill was born in 1934 in New York City, the son of the Reverend Gerald Francis Burrill, later Bishop of Chicago, and Elna Burrill. He studied at the Sewanee: The University of the South and later at the General Theological Seminary. He also had a Master of Divinity and an honorary Doctor of Divinity from General.

== Ordination ==
Burrill was ordained deacon on June 20, 1959, by Bishop Charles L. Street, suffragan bishop of Chicago, and as a priest later that year. He served as the Episcopal chaplain at the University of California between 1962 and 1973. He was also vicar of St Martin's Church in Davis, California and later became rector of the same church. In 1982, he was appointed archdeacon of Northern California.

== Bishop ==
Burrill was elected coadjutor bishop of Rochester on November 5, 1983, after 18 ballots during a special convention which took place in Christ Church in Corning, New York. He was consecrated on April 26, 1984, with Presiding Bishop John Allin as chief consecrator in the Cathedral of the Sacred Heart in Rochester, New York. He succeeded as diocesan bishop on July 1, 1984, upon the retirement of Robert R. Spears Jr. He remained in Rochester till 1999 after which he served as Assistant Bishop of the Episcopal Diocese of Arizona. He was also Bishop-in-Residence at All Saints' Church in Phoenix, Arizona.

== Personal life and death ==
Burrill married Kay Clough in 1960, and together they had four children. After his wife died in 2010, he married Marilyn Carol Usher in 2013. Burrill died on June 15, 2025, at the age of 91.
