= Dominic Barrington =

British Anglican cleric

The Very Reverend Dominic Barrington
- Dean of York
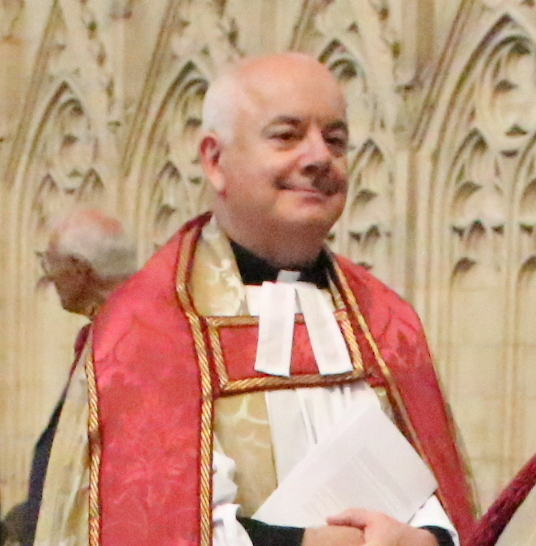
- Barrington in 2023
- Church: Church of England
- In office: November 2022 to present
- Predecessor: Jonathan Frost
- Other post: Dean of St James Cathedral, Chicago

Orders
- Ordination: 1995 (deacon); 1996 (priest)

Personal details
- Born: Dominic Matthew Jesse Barrington; 1962 (age 63–64)
- Denomination: Anglicanism
- Spouse: Alison Barrington
- Children: Benedict Barrington Linus Barrington
- Education: Hatfield College, Durham; Ripon College Cuddesdon; Church Divinity School of the Pacific

Dominic Matthew Jesse Barrington (born 1962) is a British Anglican priest. Since 2022, he has been Dean of York Minster, the cathedral of the Church of England's Diocese of York. He had been dean of St James Cathedral, Chicago, in the Episcopal Church (United States), from 2015 to 2022.

== Early life and education ==
Barrington was born in 1962. He studied at Hatfield College, Durham, graduating from Durham University with a Bachelor of Arts (BA) degree in 1984 and a Master of Science (MSc) degree in 1985. He trained for ordination at Ripon College Cuddesdon, an Anglican theological college, graduating from the University of Oxford with a further BA in 1994. He then spent a year studying at the Church Divinity School of the Pacific, a seminary of the Episcopal Church in the United States, graduating with a Master of Theological Studies (MTS) degree in 1995.

== Ordained ministry ==
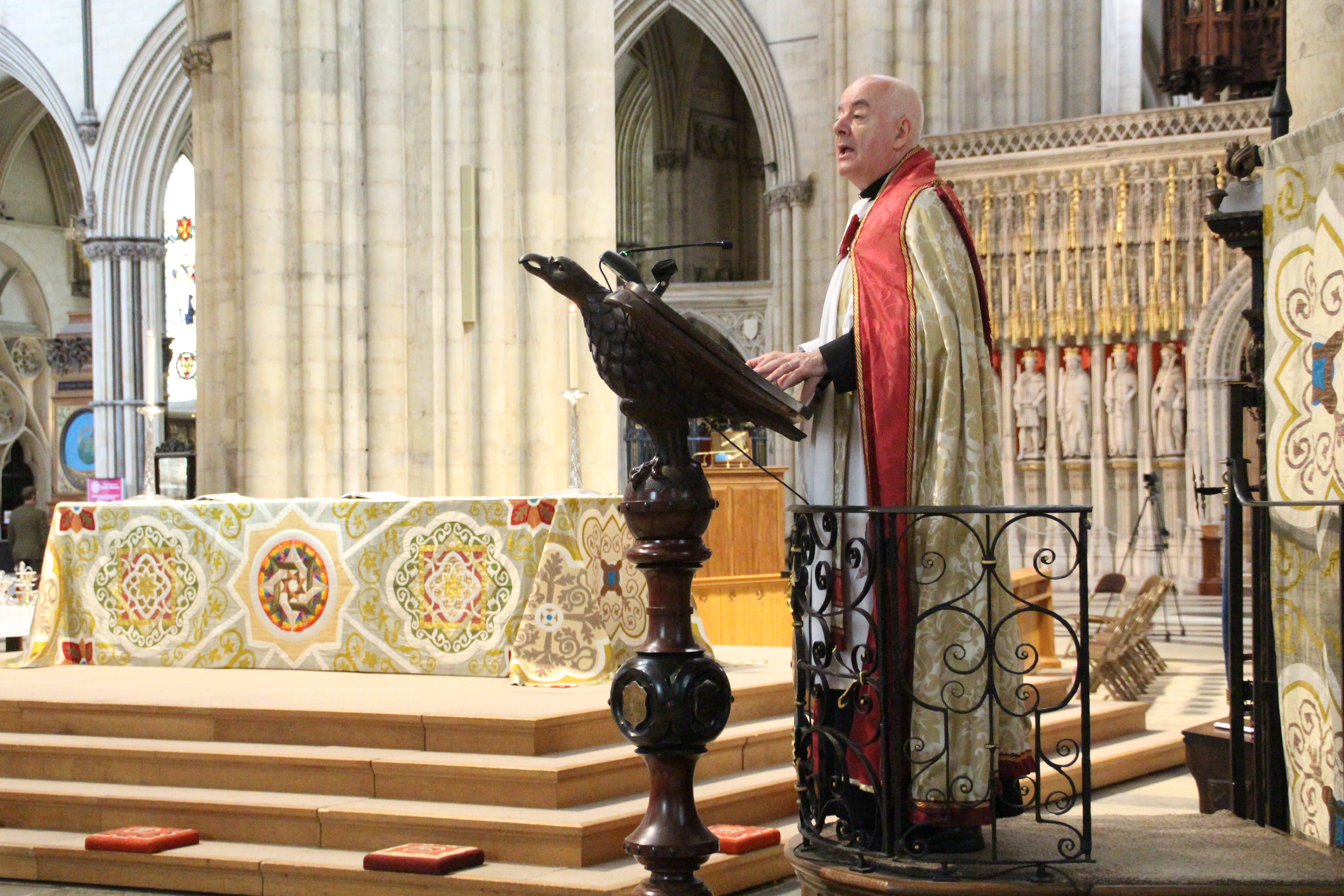
Barrington speaking in York Minister in 2023

Barrington was ordained in the Church of England as a deacon in 1995 and as a priest in 1996. He served his curacy at St Mary the Virgin, Mortlake in the Diocese of Southwark between 1995 and 1998. He then returned to Durham University, his alma mater, as chaplain to St Chad's College, Durham. In 2003, he returned to parish ministry and was appointed priest-in-charge of St Peter and St Paul's Church, Kettering with St Michael and All Angels in the Diocese of Peterborough. He was made the benefice's rector in 2010.

In March 2015, it was announced that he would be the next dean of St James Cathedral, Chicago, United States; it is the cathedral of the Episcopal Diocese of Chicago. He was installed as the 8th dean of St James Cathedral during a service on 13 September 2015.

On 13 July 2022, he was announced as the next Dean of York, succeeding Jonathan Frost, thereby returning to England. He was installed as the 77th dean during a service held on 12 November 2022 at York Minster.
