= William W. Wiedrich =

William Walter Wiedrich (August 19, 1931 in Stambaugh, Michigan – November 26, 2014 in Muskegon, Michigan) was suffragan bishop of the Episcopal Diocese of Chicago from February 1991 to December 1996, under future Presiding Bishop Frank Griswold. He was ordained a deacon in 1956 and a priest in 1957 in the Episcopal Diocese of Northern Michigan by the Right Reverend Herman R. Page Jr. He was consecrated on February 23, 1991, and retired on December 31, 1996.
