= Charles Street =

Charles Street may refer to:

== People ==
- Charles E. Street, American football player and coach
- Charles L. Street (1891-1968), suffragan bishop

== Places ==
- Charles Street (Baltimore)
- Charles Street (Boston)
  - Charles Street Jail
- Charles Street, Mayfair, in London
- Charles Street (Manhattan)
- Charles Street, Perth, Australia
- Charles Street, Wrexham, Wales
- Charles Street, Cardiff, Wales, named after Charles Vachell
