= Jeffrey Lee (bishop) =

American bishop

The Right Reverend Jeffrey Dean Lee M.Div.
- Bishop of Chicago
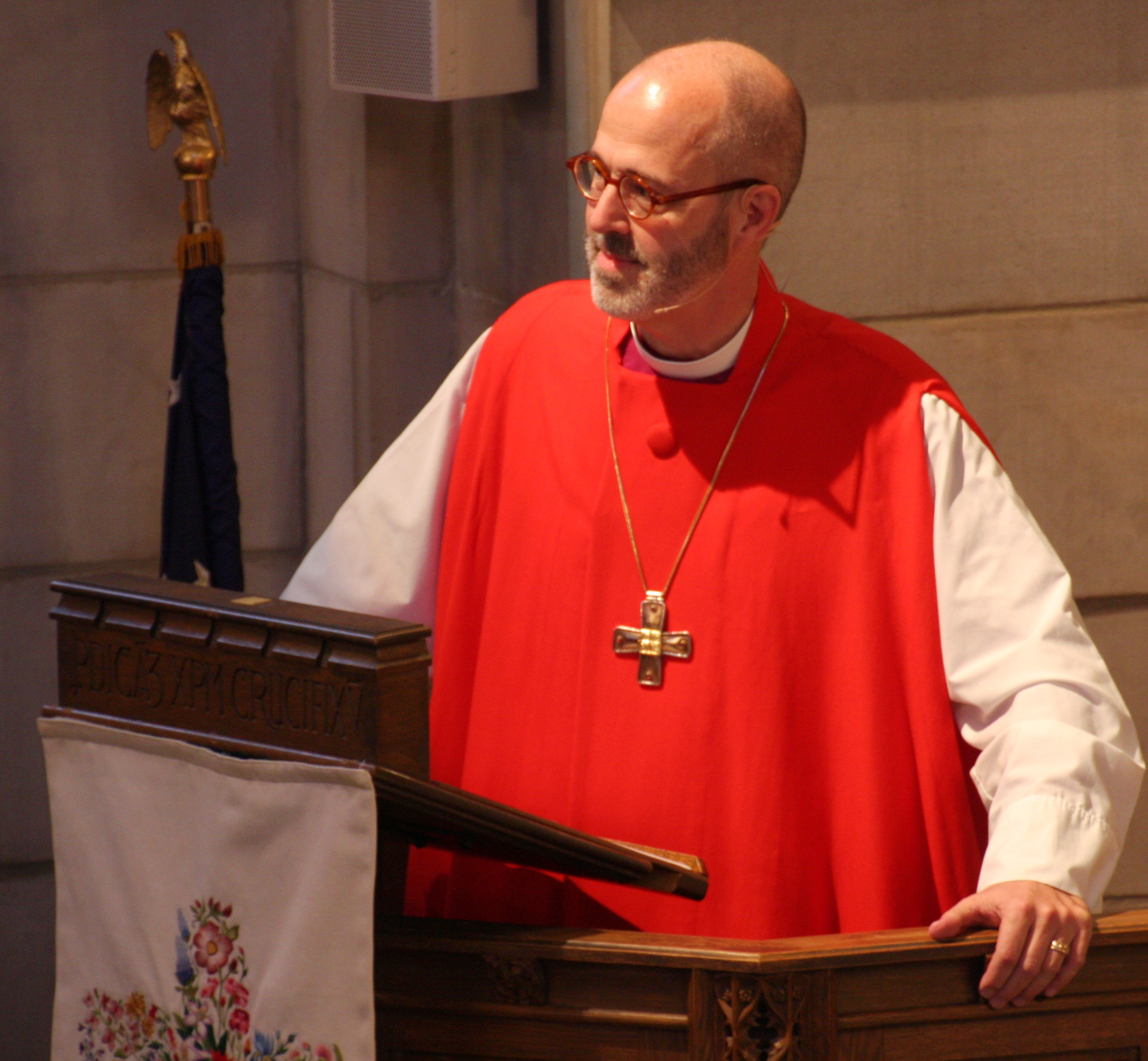
- Jeffrey Lee in 2016
- Church: Episcopal Church
- Diocese: Chicago
- Elected: November 10, 2007
- In office: February 2, 2008 – December 31, 2020
- Predecessor: William D. Persell
- Successor: Paula Clark

Orders
- Ordination: 1985 by William C. R. Sheridan
- Consecration: February 2, 2008 by Katharine Jefferts Schori

Personal details
- Denomination: Anglican (prev. Lutheran)
- Spouse: Lisa Rogers Lee
- Children: 2

Jeffrey Dean Lee is a bishop of the Episcopal Church who served as the Twelfth Bishop of Chicago from 2008 to 2020.

A native of Michigan, Lee was raised in the Lutheran faith. At an early age he was urged by his pastor to consider ordained ministry. As a young man he joined the Episcopal Church. After his marriage to Lisa in 1979 they moved to New York City where they both worked as buyers for Bloomingdale's. The juxtaposition of wealth and extreme poverty side by side that Lee saw in New York led Lee to decide to pursue ordained ministry. Lee received his seminary education at Nashotah House in Nashotah, Wisconsin.

Lee served as the canon to the ordinary after being ordained as a priest. He also worked in church development, having started a suburban congregation near Indianapolis, Indiana. Lee worked as a rector with declining parishes in both Wisconsin and Washington before being elected Bishop of Chicago. Lee was chosen from a slate of eight nominees. Lee was the 1,026th bishop consecrated for the Episcopal Church. He has served as Bishop Provisional in the Episcopal Diocese of Milwaukee since April 1, 2021.

== Reunification with Quincy ==
A major event that happened during Lee's time in office was the reunification of the Chicago diocese with the Episcopal Diocese of Quincy. In 2008, a majority of laity and clergy in the Quincy diocese left to form a diocese in the more conservative Anglican Church in North America. The remaining Episcopalians in Quincy reformed their diocese and in 2012 approached Lee and the leadership of the Chicago diocese about the possibility of reunification with Chicago. In November of that year the Chicago diocese's convention agreed that reunification should be pursued and on June 8, 2013, both diocesan conventions voted unanimously to reunify. The reunification was ratified by a majority of bishops and the standing committees of the Episcopal Church and, on September 1, 2013, the Diocese of Quincy merged into the Diocese of Chicago as the Peoria deanery.

== Planned retirement ==
On February 14, 2019, Lee announced his intention to retire in August 2020, and asked the Diocese of Chicago to begin the process of identifying and calling his replacement by or shortly after his retirement. This was delayed until the end of 2020 due to the COVID-19 pandemic.

== See also ==
- List of Episcopal bishops of the United States
- Historical list of the Episcopal bishops of the United States
