= Dudley S. Stark =

American bishop

The Right Reverend Dudley Scott Stark D.D., LL.D., S.T.D.
- Bishop of Rochester
- Church: Episcopal Church
- Diocese: Rochester
- Elected: January 26, 1950
- In office: 1950–1962
- Predecessor: Bartel H. Reinheimer
- Successor: George W. Barrett

Orders
- Ordination: October 18, 1920 by Ethelbert Talbot
- Consecration: March 24, 1950 by Henry Knox Sherrill

Personal details
- Born: November 19, 1894 Waverley, New York, United States
- Died: November 23, 1971 (aged 77) York Harbor, Maine, United States
- Denomination: Anglican
- Parents: Rodney Jewett Stark & Lelia May Scott
- Spouse: Mary Leith
- Children: 3

Dudley Scott Stark (November 19, 1894 – November 23, 1971) was third bishop of the Episcopal Diocese of Rochester, serving from 1950 to 1962.

== Early life and education ==
Stark was born November 19, 1894, in Waverley, New York, the son of Rodney Jewett Stark and Lelia May Scott Stark. During World War I he served in the US Navy. He studied at Trinity College and later at the Episcopal Theological Seminary. He was awarded a Doctor of Divinity from Trinity and Kenyon College. Chicago Medical School awarded him a Legum Doctor and a Doctor of Sacred Theology from Hobart College.

== Ordination ==
Stark was ordained deacon on April 10, 1920, and priest on October 18, 1920. He was appointed assistant at St Mark's Church in Jim Thorpe, Pennsylvania, after which he became rector of the same church in 1921. He moved to New York City in 1926 to become vicar of Holy Trinity Church. In 1932 he became rector of St Chrysostom's Church in Chicago, where he remained till 1950. Subsequently, he served as Dean of the Chicago North Deanery and a canon of the cathedral chapter of Chicago.

== Episcopacy ==
Stark was elected Bishop of Bishop of Rochester on January 26, 1950, during the diocesan convention. He was consecrated on March 24, 1950, by Presiding Bishop Henry Knox Sherrill in Christ Church, Rochester, New York. He retained the post till 1962. He died of pneumonia on November 23, 1971, in York Harbor, Maine.

== Family ==
Stark married Mary Leith and together they had a son and two daughters.
