= Bartel H. Reinheimer =

American Episcopal bishop (1889–1949)

The Right Reverend Bartel Hilen Reinheimer D.D., LL.D.
- Bishop of Rochester
- Church: Episcopal Church
- Diocese: Rochester
- In office: 1938–1949
- Predecessor: David Lincoln Ferris
- Successor: Dudley S. Stark
- Previous post: Coadjutor Bishop of Rochester (1936-1938)

Orders
- Ordination: 1915 by William Andrew Leonard
- Consecration: March 4, 1936 by James De Wolf Perry

Personal details
- Born: April 6, 1889 Sandusky, Ohio, United States
- Died: November 12, 1949 (aged 60) Rochester, New York, United States
- Denomination: Anglican
- Parents: Alfred Reinheimer & Beatrice Savanack
- Spouse: Helen Marie Smith
- Children: 2

Bartel Hilen Reinheimer (April 6, 1889 – November 12, 1949) was second bishop of the Episcopal Diocese of Rochester, serving from 1938 to 1949.

== Early life and education ==
Reinheimer was born on April 6, 1889, in Sandusky, Ohio, the son of Alfred Reinheimer (1867-1930) and Beatrice Savanack (later Rudolph, 1869-1955). He studied at Kenyon College, from where he graduated with a Bachelor of Science in 1911. The same college also awarded him an honorary Doctor of Divinity in 1931. He studied at Bexley Hall from where he graduated with a Bachelor of Divinity in 1914. He was awarded an honorary Doctor of Laws by Hobart College in 1936.

== Ordination ==
Reinheimer was ordained deacon in 1914 and priest in 1915. He served as deacon and later priest-in-charge at St Mark's Church in Shelby, Ohio, between 1914 and 1916. Later he became curate of Christ Church in Dayton, Ohio, and in 1918 rector of the same church where he remained till 1921. He served as Executive secretary and Archdeacon of Southern Ohio between 1921 and 1931. In 1931 he became the National secretary of the Field Department of the Episcopal Church.

== Bishop ==
Reinheimer was elected Coadjutor Bishop of Rochester in 1936 and was consecrated on March 4, 1936, by Presiding Bishop James De Wolf Perry. In 1938 he succeeded as Bishop of Rochester. During his episcopate he also served as trustee and honorary chancellor of the Colleges of the Seneca. He was also president of the Province of New York and New Jersey in Episcopal Church between 1947 and 1949. He was also a trustee of the University of Rochester. Reinheimer died in office on November 12, 1949.

== Family ==
Reinheimer married Helen Marie Smith on August 31, 1914, and together had three sons, Frederick Smith Reinheimer (March 9, 1916 – October 2, 1990), John Bartel Reinheimer (January 2, 1918 – April 16, 2000) and Philip Reese Reinheimer (January 1923 – January 14, 1940).
