= Robert R. Spears Jr. =

American bishop (1918–2008)

The Right Reverend Robert Rae Spears D.D.
- Bishop of Rochester
- Church: Episcopal Church
- Diocese: Rochester
- Elected: April 26, 1970
- In office: 1970–1984
- Predecessor: George W. Barrett
- Successor: William G. Burrill
- Previous post: Suffragan Bishop of West Missouri (1967-1970)

Orders
- Ordination: May 15, 1944 by Cameron Josiah Davis
- Consecration: May 15, 1967 by John E. Hines

Personal details
- Born: June 18, 1918 Rochester, New York, United States
- Died: March 18, 2008 (aged 89) Rochester, New York, United States
- Denomination: Anglican
- Parents: Robert Rae Spears & Phebe Elizabeth Wing
- Spouse: Charlotte Luttrell
- Children: 3

Robert Rae "Bob" Spears Jr. (June 18, 1918 – March 18, 2008) was a prominent American prelate who served as Bishop of Rochester from 1970 to 1984.

== Childhood and education ==
Spears was born on June 18, 1918, in Rochester, New York, the son of Robert Rae Spears and Phebe Elizabeth Wing. He graduated from Hobart College in Upstate New York in 1940 with a Bachelor of Arts. He answered the call to holy orders in the Episcopal Church. He graduated from The General Theological Seminary in New York City in 1943 with a Bachelor of Sacred Theology. He was awarded a Doctor of Divinity in 1969.

== Priest ==
Spears was ordained a deacon on June 24, 1943, and priest on May 15, 1944, both by Bishop Cameron Josiah Davis of Western New York. He served as curate of St Stephen's Church in Olean, New York from 1943 till 1944 after which he became rector of St Paul's Church in Mayville, New York. On February 15, 1948, he became canon of St Paul's Cathedral in Buffalo, New York. He served as rector of St Peter's Church in Auburn, New York from 1950 till 1954, when he became vicar of the Chapel of the Intercession in New York City, where he remained till September 1, 1960. From 1960 till 1967 he served as rector of Trinity Church in Princeton, New Jersey.

== Bishop ==
Spears was elected Suffragan Bishop of West Missouri in November 1966. He was consecrated on May 15, 1967, by Presiding Bishop John E. Hines. On April 26, 1970, he was elected Bishop of Rochester. He was consecrated under apostolic succession by the Presiding Bishop He supported female ordination in the 1970s, then a controversial subject. He was best known for his liberal views. Spears was an important leader in the Episcopal Church's progressive wing. He was in favor of the decision to ordain women. He opposed the Vietnam War, and spoke out against violence during the Attica Prison riot. He was also an early proponent of involvement in the Episcopal Church by its gay and lesbian members. He co-chaired the Episcopal Church's Standing Commission on Human Affairs and Health from 1976 to 1979 He retired in 1984 and served as Associate at St James' Church on Madison Avenue in New York City. At the time of his death he was an Associate at St Thomas' Church in Rochester, New York. He died on March 18, 2008.

== Family ==
Spears was married to his wife Charlotte Luttrell for decades, and they had three children and three grandchildren.

== See also ==
- List of Bishop Succession in the Episcopal Church

Episcopal Church (USA) titles
Preceded by George W. Barrett	5th Bishop of Rochester; 1970–1984	Succeeded by William G. Burrill
