= William Edward Toll =

American bishop

The Right Reverend William Edward Toll
- Suffragan Bishop of Chicago
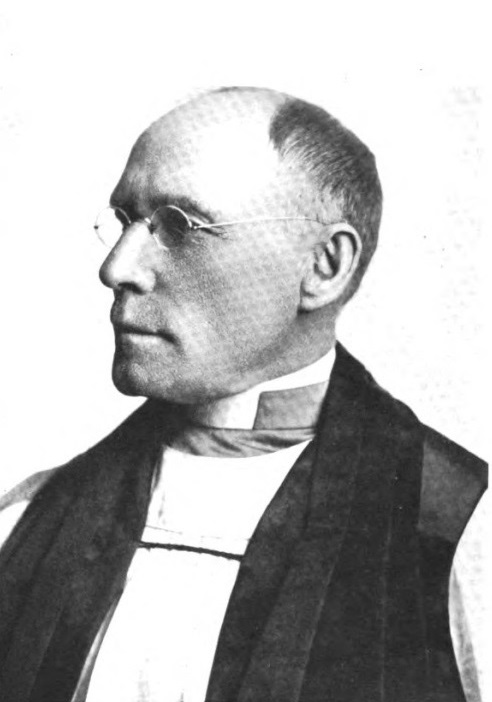
- Church: Episcopal Church in the United States of America
- See: Episcopal Diocese of Chicago
- In office: 1911 — 1915
- Successor: Sheldon Munson Griswold

Personal details
- Born: November 29, 1843 Bedford, England
- Died: June 27, 1915 (aged 71) Chicago, USA

The Right Reverend William Edward Toll (November 29, 1843 – June 27, 1915) was Suffragan Bishop of the Episcopal Diocese of Chicago.

== Biography ==
William Edward Toll was born in Bedford, England on 29 November 1843, the son of John and Mary Toll, and christened at St Peter's Church, Bedford, on 31 December 1843. He was educated at Bedford Modern School.

Toll emigrated to the United States at the age of 21. He was ordained in 1871 and initially served as curate in the Grace Episcopal church until called to a pastorate in Cleveland, Ohio. In 1874 he was again transferred to the Episcopal Diocese of Chicago and became the Rector of St Peter's Church at Sycamore where he remained for eight years. He later became Rector of the Christ Episcopal Church at Waukegan following which he was made Archdeacon of the Episcopal Diocese of Chicago.

Toll was consecrated on 27 December 1911 as the Suffragan Bishop of the Episcopal Diocese of Chicago becoming the third Suffragan Bishop in the United States the others being the Suffragan Bishops of New York City and Philadelphia.

Toll died of a heart attack on 27 June 1915 when ascending steps at a train station. He was survived by a wife, two daughters and a son. There are photographic portraits of Toll at the National Portrait Gallery, London.
