= Frank Griswold =

American bishop (1937–2023)

The Most Reverend Frank Griswold
- 25th Presiding Bishop of the Episcopal Church
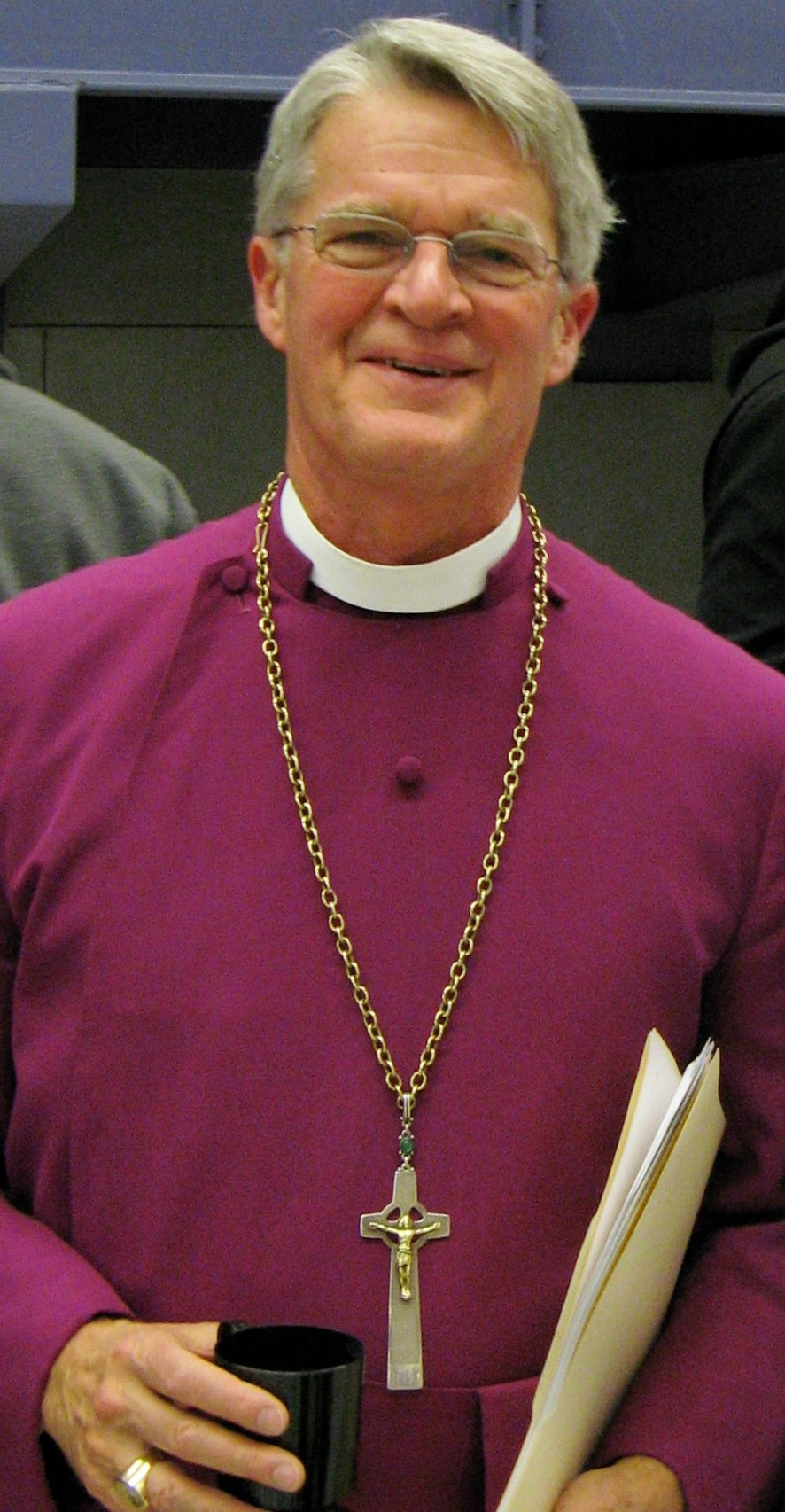
- Griswold in 2007
- Church: Episcopal Church
- Elected: July 21, 1997
- In office: 1998–2006
- Predecessor: Edmond L. Browning
- Successor: Katharine Jefferts Schori
- Other posts: Bishop of Chicago (1987–1998); Coadjutor Bishop of Chicago (1985–1987)

Orders
- Ordination: June 23, 1963 by Joseph Gillespie Armstrong
- Consecration: March 2, 1985 by John Maury Allin

Personal details
- Born: September 18, 1937 Bryn Mawr, Pennsylvania, U.S.
- Died: March 5, 2023 (aged 85) Philadelphia, Pennsylvania, U.S.
- Denomination: Anglican
- Spouse: Phoebe Wetzel
- Children: Eliza Griswold; Hannah McFarland
- Education: Harvard University (BA); Oriel College, Oxford (BA)

Frank Tracy Griswold III (September 18, 1937 – March 5, 2023) was an American clergyman who served as the 25th Presiding Bishop of the Episcopal Church.

== Early life and education ==
Griswold was born in Bryn Mawr, Pennsylvania to Frank Tracy Griswold, Jr. and Louisa Johnson Whitney Griswold, and educated at St. Paul's School in Concord, New Hampshire. He studied at Harvard College, where he majored in English literature, graduating with a Bachelor of Arts (AB) degree in 1959. He trained for ordination at the General Theological Seminary and also earned a further BA degree in theology from Oriel College, Oxford in 1962: as per tradition, his BA was promoted to a Master of Arts (MA Oxon) degree in 1966.

== Ordained ministry ==
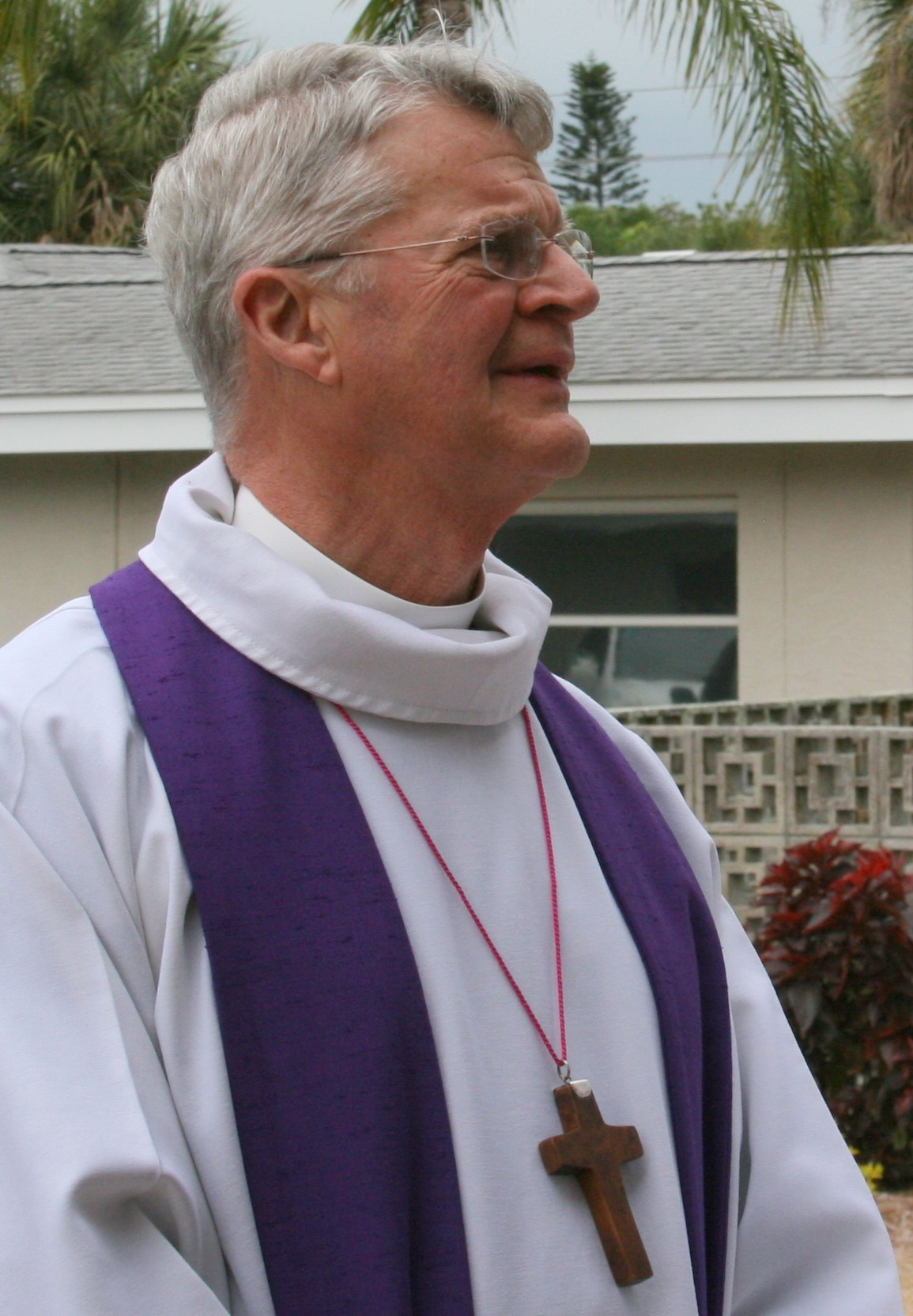
Griswold in 2013

Griswold was ordained as a deacon on December 15, 1962, by Andrew Yu-Yue Tsu and as a priest on June 23, 1963 by Joseph Gillespie Armstrong. He then served at three parishes in the Episcopal Diocese of Pennsylvania, including St Andrew's Church in Yardley, Pennsylvania, (1967-1974) and St Martin-in-the-Fields in Chestnut Hill, Philadelphia, Pennsylvania, from 1976 until his nomination as Bishop of Chicago. He was consecrated a bishop on March 2, 1985, by John Allin; upon which he became coadjutor bishop of the Episcopal Diocese of Chicago. He was Bishop of Chicago from 1987 until he became the presiding bishop in 1998.

Griswold was co-chair of the Anglican-Roman Catholic International Commission from 1998 to 2003. He was a member of the standing committee for the 1998 Lambeth Conference. He also served on diocesan, national, and international committees for liturgy, worship, and ecumenism. He was interested in interfaith dialogue and sat on the board of World Religious Leaders for the Elijah Interfaith Institute.

In 2003, Griswold supported the successful appointment of Gene Robinson as bishop of the Episcopal Diocese of New Hampshire, making Robinson the denomination's first openly gay bishop. Griswold presided over Robinson's ordination ceremony. Due to threats of violence, there was a heavy security presence and both men wore bulletproof vests.

Griswold's term as presiding bishop ended on November 1, 2006. He was succeeded by Katharine Jefferts Schori, the first woman to become a primate in the Anglican Communion. He continued a ministry of teaching, preaching, writing, lecturing and leading retreats, nationally and internationally. Following completion of his term as presiding bishop, he served as a visiting professor at seminaries and universities in South Korea, Cuba and Japan, as well as at the Episcopal Divinity School and the Church Divinity School of the Pacific, Virginia Theological Seminary and Seabury-Western. He also served as bishop visitor to the Society of St. John the Evangelist.

== Personal life and death ==
Griswold and his wife, Phoebe Wetzel Griswold, lived in Philadelphia. They had two daughters, Eliza and Hannah. He was a cousin of both Sheldon Munson Griswold and Alexander Viets Griswold, both Episcopal bishops.

Griswold died from respiratory failure at a hospital in Philadelphia on March 5, 2023, at the age of 85.

== Honors ==
He received honorary degrees from the General Theological Seminary, Seabury-Western Theological Seminary, Nashotah House, Sewanee, Rikkyo University and Berkeley Divinity School, the Virginia Theological Seminary, Seminary of the Southwest and Episcopal Divinity School. He was also made an Associate Sub Prelate of the Most Venerable Order of the Hospital of Saint John of Jerusalem by Queen Elizabeth II in 1997.

== Bibliography ==
- Going Home: An Invitation to Jubilee (Cowley, 2000) ISBN 9781561011865
- Tracking Down the Holy Ghost: Reflections on Love and Longing (Church Publishing, 2017) ISBN 9780819233653
- Praying Our Days: A Guide and Companion (Morehouse Publishing, 2018) ISBN 9780819223593
- (with Mark McIntosh) Seeds of Faith: Theology and Spirituality at the Heart of Christian Belief (Eerdmans, 2022) ISBN 9780802879738
- (with Mark McIntosh) Harvest of Hope: A Contemplative Approach to Holy Scripture (Eerdmans, 2022) ISBN 9780802879721

== Consecrators ==
- John Maury Allin, 23rd Presiding Bishop
- Gerald Francis Burrill, 8th Bishop of Chicago
- James Winchester Montgomery, 9th Bishop of Chicago

Griswold was the 794th bishop consecrated in the Episcopal Church.

== See also ==
- List of presiding bishops of the Episcopal Church in the United States of America
- List of Episcopal bishops of the United States
- Historical list of the Episcopal bishops of the United States

Episcopal Church (USA) titles
Preceded by James W. Montgomery	Bishop of Chicago; 1987–1998	Succeeded by William Persell
Preceded by Edmond L. Browning	Presiding Bishop; 1998–2006	Succeeded by Katharine Jefferts Schori
