= Episcopal Diocese of Rochester =

Episcopal Church diocese in the US

Coordinates: 43°9′3″N 77°34′48″W

Diocese of Rochester Diœcesis Rocestriensis

Location
- Country: United States
- Territory: Allegany, Livingston, Monroe, Ontario, Schuyler, Steuben, Wayne, Yates
- Ecclesiastical province: Province II
- Deaneries: 5

Statistics
- Parishes: 46 (2024)
- Members: 6,529 (2023)

Information
- Denomination: Episcopal Church
- Established: December 15, 1931
- Cathedral: None
- Language: English

Current leadership
- Bishop: Kara Wagner Sherer

Map
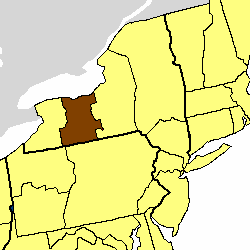
- Location of the Diocese of Rochester

Website
- episcopalrochester.org

The Episcopal Diocese of Rochester is the diocese of the Episcopal Church in the United States of America with jurisdiction over eight counties in west central New York. It is bounded on the north by Lake Ontario, on the east by the Episcopal Diocese of Central New York, on the south by the Episcopal Diocese of Central Pennsylvania and on the west by the Episcopal Diocese of Western New York. It is in Province 2 and has no cathedral. Its diocesan offices are in Henrietta, New York.

In 2024, the diocese reported average Sunday attendance (ASA) of 2,031 persons.This was a relative decrease from ASA of 3,362 in 2017. Between 2015 and 2023, reported membership decreased from 7,658 persons to 6,529. No membership statistics were reported in 2024. Plate and pledge income reported for the diocese in 2024 was $5,547,806.

== History ==
The Episcopal Diocese of New York initially encompassed the whole state. The Diocese of Western New York was created in 1837. Bishop Arthur Cleveland Coxe recommending the partition of the diocese beginning in 1873. David Lincoln Ferris, bishop coadjutor of Western New York since 1924, succeeded Charles Henry Brent as bishop in 1929. The partition of the Diocese of Western New York was approved by the national church's 1931 General Convention. That December the new Episcopal Diocese of Rochester came into being.

The diocese was newly created, though many of the congregations had already begun more than a century before. In 1816 when John Henry Hobart, Third Bishop of New York, began his work, congregations were active in Avon, Canandaigua, Geneva, Clifton Springs, Catharine, and Bath. On 15 and 16 December 1931, forty congregations sent delegations to the primary convention of the new diocese at Trinity Church, Geneva, where the 1837 primary convention of the Diocese of Western New York had also been held. At first much of the administration of the diocese was handled in Bishop Ferris' home at 325 Park Avenue, Rochester. Soon the diocese rented a suite of rooms in the Hiram Sibley Building, at 311 Alexander Street. In 1947 the Trustees purchased "Church House" at 110 Merriman Street. In 1954 Elizabeth Sibley Stebbins died, one of the early leaders in the diocese. Her home at 935 East Avenue became "Diocesan House". The Second World War moved Bishop Bartel H. Reinheimer (1938–1949) and his service group, the "Bishop's Men," to send aid to the Diocese of Rochester, England, where post-war privations and rationing were still severe. The Woman's Auxiliary, working on both congregational and diocesan levels, helped raise money and direct the mission of the church under Bishops Reinheimer, Dudley S. Stark (1950–1962), and George W. Barrett (1963–1969).

The Fifth Bishop of Rochester, Robert Rae Spears, Jr. (1970–1984), helped the diocese to deal with issues like: how to interpret the Bible, whether to ordain women and gay people, and - among others - how to distribute the enormous legacy left to the diocese by Margaret Woodbury Strong's will. That financial windfall gave rise to the diocese's district system in 1972. The system's original purpose was to give voices to people and congregations throughout the diocese in using the Strong Fund. A large portion of the fund eventually went to help the National Episcopal Church and its mission.

== Current bishop ==
On February 24, 2024, Kara Wagner Sherer, rector of St. John's Episcopal Church and current Dean of Chicago North Deanery, became the bishop elect of the diocese of Rochester.

=== Past bishops ===
==== Prince G. Singh ====
Prince G. Singh was elected the eighth Bishop of Rochester on February 2, 2008, and was consecrated at the Eastman Theatre in Rochester, New York, on May 31, 2008, by Katharine Jefferts Schori, the Presiding Bishop. Co-Consecrators of the service were Jack M. McKelvey, George Councell, John Croneberger, Mark M. Beckwith, Carol Gallagher, and Marie Jerge, Bishop of the Upstate New York Synod of the Evangelical Lutheran Church in America. Singh became the diocesan Bishop of Rochester at the close of the consecration service on May 31, 2008.[2]

==== Jack M. McKelvey ====
Jack M. McKelvey was the seventh bishop of Rochester from 2000 to 2008. He has a master's of divinity and an honorary doctorate from Virginia Theological Seminary. He was suffragan bishop of the Episcopal Diocese of Newark from 1991 to 1999. McKelvey currently serves as interim president at Colgate Rochester Crozer Divinity School.

==== Robert Rae Spears, Jr. ====
The fifth Bishop of Rochester, Robert Rae Spears, Jr. (1970–1984), helped the diocese to deal with several issues: how to interpret the Bible, whether to ordain women and gay people, and how to distribute the enormous legacy left to the diocese by Margaret Woodbury Strong's will.

=== List of bishops ===
The bishops of Rochester have been:

1. David L. Ferris, (1931–1938), who previously served the Episcopal Diocese of Western New York as suffragan bishop (1920–1924), coadjutor bishop (1924) - 1929) and fifth diocesan bishop, (1929–1931).
  * Bartel H. Reinheimer, coadjutor bishop (1936)
2. Bartel H. Reinheimer, (1938–1949)
3. Dudley S. Stark, (1950–1962)
4. George W. Barrett, (1963–1969)
5. Robert R. Spears, Jr., (1970–1984; d. 2008)
6. William G. Burrill, (1984–1999; d. 2025)
7. Jack M. McKelvey, (2000–2008)
8. Prince G. Singh, (2008–2022)
- Stephen T. Lane, provisional bishop (2022–2024)

9. Kara Wagner Sherer (with the distinction of the diocese's first woman bishop), (2024-present)

== See also ==
- Historical list of bishops of the Episcopal Church in the United States of America
