= George W. Barrett (bishop) =

American Episcopalian Bishop

The Right Reverend George West Barrett D.D.
- Bishop of Rochester
- Church: Episcopal Church
- Diocese: Rochester
- Elected: February 5, 1963
- In office: 1963–1969
- Predecessor: Dudley S. Stark
- Successor: Robert R. Spears Jr.

Orders
- Ordination: March 1934 by Robert Burton Gooden
- Consecration: May 11, 1963 by Horace W. B. Donegan

Personal details
- Born: May 10, 1908 Iowa City, Iowa, United States
- Died: December 3, 2000 (aged 92) Santa Barbara, California, United States
- Denomination: Anglican
- Parents: Edward Cecil Barrett & Mary Parsons West
- Spouse: Emma Dee Hanford (m. 1936); Bettina Tvede (m. 1970)
- Children: 2

George West Barrett (May 10, 1908 - September 3, 2000) was an American Episcopal prelate who served as the fourth Bishop of Rochester between 1963 and 1969.

== Education ==
Barrett was born in 1908 in Iowa City, Iowa but was raised in Pasadena, California. He studied at the University of California, Los Angeles from where he graduated with a Bachelor of Arts and later studied theology at the Episcopal Divinity School and graduated in 1933.

== Priest ==
He was ordained deacon in July 1933 by Bishop W. Bertrand Stevens of Los Angeles, and priest in March 1934 by Bishop Robert Burton Gooden, Suffragan of Los Angeles. He became curate at St Paul's Church in Oakland, California, where he remained till 1936. Later he served as rector of St Mark's Church in Upland, California. In 1942 he moved to Monrovia, California to become rector of St Luke's Church and in 1947 he became rector of St James' Church in Los Angeles. In 1955 he became rector of Christ Church in Bronxville, New York and professor of Pastoral Theology at the General Theological Seminary in New York City.

== Bishop ==
Barrett was elected Bishop of Rochester during the second ballot on February 5, 1963, during a special convention in Rochester. He was consecrated on May 11, 1963, by Horace W. B. Donegan, Bishop of New York in Christ Church in Bronxville, New York. He retained the post till his retirement in 1969. After retirement he served as Assistant Bishop of Los Angeles and was bishop in residence at the Church of St Alban in Los Angeles and Trinity Church in Santa Barbara, California.

== Ordination of women ==
Barrett is best remembered for ordaining four women to the priesthood on September 7, 1975, before the Episcopal Church had approved the ordination of women. The ordination took place at the St. Stephen and the Incarnation Episcopal Church in Washington D.C. The four women were Lee McGee (Street), Alison Palmer, Betty Rosenberg (Powell), and Diane Tickell, four women who became known as the Washington Four. After the ordination, Barrett was temporary banned from performing his duties. The General Convention approved the ordination of women a year later.

== Family ==
Barrett married his first wife Emma Dee Hanford in 1936 but the marriage ended in divorce. They had a daughter and a son together. He remarried in 1970 to Bettina Tvede.

== Death ==
Barrett died in Santa Barbara, California on December 3, 2000, after stopping kidney dialysis.
