= Frank Burrill =

American Episcopal bishop (1906–2001)

The Right Reverend Gerald Francis Burrill D.D.
- Bishop of Chicago
- Church: Episcopal Church
- Diocese: Chicago
- Elected: October 20, 1953
- In office: 1954–1971
- Predecessor: Wallace E. Conkling
- Successor: James W. Montgomery
- Previous post: Suffragan Bishop of Dallas (1950-1954)

Orders
- Ordination: June 1933 by William T. Manning
- Consecration: September 29, 1950 by Henry St. George Tucker

Personal details
- Born: June 8, 1906 Bangor, Maine, United States
- Died: July 17, 2001 (aged 95) Sarasota, Florida, United States
- Denomination: Anglican
- Parents: William George Burrill and Clara Mary McCafferty
- Spouse: Elna Jean Thompson
- Children: 2

Gerald Francis Burrill (June 8, 1906 – July 17, 2001) was the eighth bishop of the Episcopal Diocese of Chicago.

== Early life and education ==
Burrill was born on June 8, 1906, in Bangor, Maine, the son of William George Burrill and Clara Mary McCafferty. In 1929 he graduated from the University of Maine with a Bachelor of Arts. After studying at the General Theological Seminary, he graduated with a Bachelor of Sacred Theology in 1932.

== Priest ==
Burrill was ordained deacon in 1932 and a priest a year later in 1933. His first post was as priest-in-charge of All Saints Church in Mariners Harbor, Staten Island. In 1935 he became rector of St Paul's Church in Morrisania, Bronx. He also served as a member of the board of religion education in New York in 1939 and later served as its president from 1941 till 1944. He was also president of the New York Churchman's Clericus in 1943 and served as chairman of the commission on church education of the second province in 1944. He served as rector of Christ Church in Williamsport, Pennsylvania from 1946 till 1950.

== Bishop ==
Burrill was elected Suffragan Bishop of Dallas on May 30, 1950. He was consecrated on September 29, 1950, by former Presiding Bishop Henry St. George Tucker as chief consecrator in St Matthew's Cathedral in Dallas, Texas. In 1954, he was elected Bishop of Chicago. While in Chicago he established the Church of St James as the permanent cathedral of Chicago after the original Cathedral of St Peter and St Paul was destroyed. He was also instrumental in promoting integration in the 'white' parishes of Chicago and promoting the elections of black clergy as rectors and vicars. Burrill retired on October 1, 1971. After retirement he moved to Sarasota, Florida and assisted the Bishop of Southwest Florida. He died on July 17, 2001.

== Family ==
Burrill and his wife Elna had two sons, James and William, the latter having served as Bishop of Rochester.

== See also ==
- William G. Burrill (son)
