= Kara Wagner Sherer =

American Episcopal priest

The Rt. Rev. Kara Anne Marie Wagner Sherer is an American Episcopal priest who has served as the 9th Bishop of Rochester in New York State since 2024. She was previously rector of St. John's Episcopal Church in Chicago.

== Education ==
A lifelong Episcopalian, Sherer was educated at a private Catholic school in Marshall, Minnesota, from 1st to 8th grade before attending public high school. She then studied at St. Olaf College, a Lutheran liberal arts college in Northfield, Minnesota, and later at Seabury-Western Theological Seminary in Evanston, Illinois.

== Career ==
After teaching at St. Hilda's & St. Hugh's School in New York City and Sacred Heart Schools in Chicago, Sherer trained for ordination at Seabury-Western Theological Seminary. She served as rector of St. John's Episcopal Church, Chicago, from 2005 to 2024 and was dean of the North Chicago deanery.

On February 24, 2024, she was elected to serve as the 9th Bishop of Rochester. Her consecration was held at Asbury First United Methodist Church in Rochester on July 13, 2024.

== Family ==
Sherer is married to John William Wagner Sherer, organist and music director at the Fourth Presbyterian Church in Chicago from 1996 to 2024. They have two daughters.
