= Quintin E. Primo Jr. =

American bishop (1913–1998)

The Right Reverend Quintin Ebenezer Primo Jr. D.D., L.H.D.
- Suffragan Bishop of Chicago
- Church: Episcopal Church
- Diocese: Chicago
- Elected: 1971
- In office: 1972–1985
- Other post: Interim Bishop of Delaware (1986)

Orders
- Ordination: June 28, 1942 by John Durham Wing
- Consecration: September 30, 1972 by John E. Hines

Personal details
- Born: July 1, 1913 Liberty County, Georgia, United States
- Died: January 15, 1998 (aged 84) Hockessin, Delaware, United States
- Denomination: Anglican
- Parents: Quinton Ebenezer Primo & Alvira Wilhelmina Wellington
- Spouse: Winifred Thompson
- Children: 3

Quintin Ebenezer Primo Jr. (July 1, 1913 – January 15, 1998) was suffragan bishop of the Episcopal Diocese of Chicago from 1972 to 1985. He also served as interim bishop of the Episcopal Diocese of Delaware from January 1 to November 8, 1986.

== Early life and education ==
Primo was born in Liberty County, Georgia on July 1, 1913, the son of the Reverend Quinton Ebenezer Primo, a priest from British Guiana, and Alvira Wilhelmina Wellington. He was educated at Saint Augustine's College High School in Raleigh, North Carolina and received his diploma at Fort Valley Normal and Industrial Institute in Albany, Georgia in 1930. In 1934 he graduated with a Bachelor of Arts from Lincoln University and then received a Bachelor of Sacred Theology from Lincoln University in 1937. He then completed a Master of Divinity from Virginia Theological Seminary in 1941. Primo also received degrees from General Theological Seminary and Seabury-Western Theological Seminary in Evanston, Illinois.

== Ministry ==
Bishop John Durham Wing of South Florida ordained Primo as a deacon on July 13, 1941, then as a priest on June 28, 1942, on both occasions in the Church of St Agnes, Miami. He was presented by his father, then rector of St. Matthew's Church in Delray Beach, Florida. Between 1941 and 1942, Primo served as curate at St Agnes' Church in Miami, Florida before moving to North Carolina in 1942 where he became priest-in-charge of three parishes; St. Gabriel's Church in Rutherfordton, Good Shepherd Church in Tryon and St. Andrew's Church in Green River. In 1944 he accepted a position as priest-in-charge of St. Stephen's Church in Winston-Salem.

Between 1945 and 1947 Primo served as priest-in-charge of St. Timothy's Church in Brooklyn, New York, before moving to Rochester, New York to become priest-in-charge of St. Simon's Church in 1947, of which he became rector in 1961 after the church became a parish. Primo also worked to create the parish of St. Matthew's Church in Wilmington, Delaware after becoming priest-in-charge of the mission in 1963, succeeding in 1966 as the mission became a parish with him as rector. In 1969, Primo moved to Detroit, where two years later he managed to merge the Church of St. Matthew, a predominantly black congregation, with the historic and predominantly white St Joseph's parish, creating St Matthew's-St Joseph's Church.

== Bishop ==
In 1972, Primo was elected Suffragan Bishop of Chicago and consecrated on September 30, 1972, in the Cathedral of Saint James by Presiding Bishop John E. Hines. Primo remained in Chicago till 1985 and then served as Interim Bishop of Delaware from January 1 to November 8, 1986 and assisted there until his death.

== Death and legacy ==
On November 8, 1986, when Primo died in Hockessin, Delaware. He helped found the Primo Center, which remains today.
