= Jack Marston McKelvey =

American bishop (born 1941)

The Right Reverend Jack Marston McKelvey
- Bishop of Rochester
- Church: Episcopal Church
- Diocese: Rochester
- Elected: June 19, 1999
- In office: 2000–2008
- Predecessor: William G. Burrill
- Successor: Prince G. Singh
- Previous post: Suffragan Bishop of Newark (1991–1999)

Orders
- Ordination: 1967 by J. Brooke Mosley
- Consecration: April 20, 1991 by O'Kelley Whitaker

Personal details
- Born: October 8, 1941 (age 84) Wilmington, Delaware, United States
- Denomination: Anglican
- Parents: George McKelvey & Dorothy Sullivan
- Spouse: Linda Boardman (m. Aug. 29, 1964)
- Children: 4

Jack Marston McKelvey (born October 8, 1941) is a bishop of The Episcopal Church, serving in the Diocese of Newark and the Diocese of Rochester.

== Biography ==
McKelvey was ordained deacon in 1966 and priest in 1967. He served as Rector of St. Paul's, Englewood, New Jersey, from 1978 to 1991. In 1991 he was elected Suffragan Bishop of Newark and was consecrated on April 20, 1991, by O'Kelley Whitaker, Bishop of Central New York. On June 19, 1999, he was elected Bishop of Rochester during a special convention in St Thomas' Church in Bath, New York. McKelvey was elected on the fifth ballot. He was installed on December 4, 1999, and started exercising his duties as Bishop of Rochester on January 1, 2000. He retired in 2008.
