= William Persell =

American bishop (born 1943)

The Right Reverend William Dailey Persell M.Div.
- Bishop of Chicago
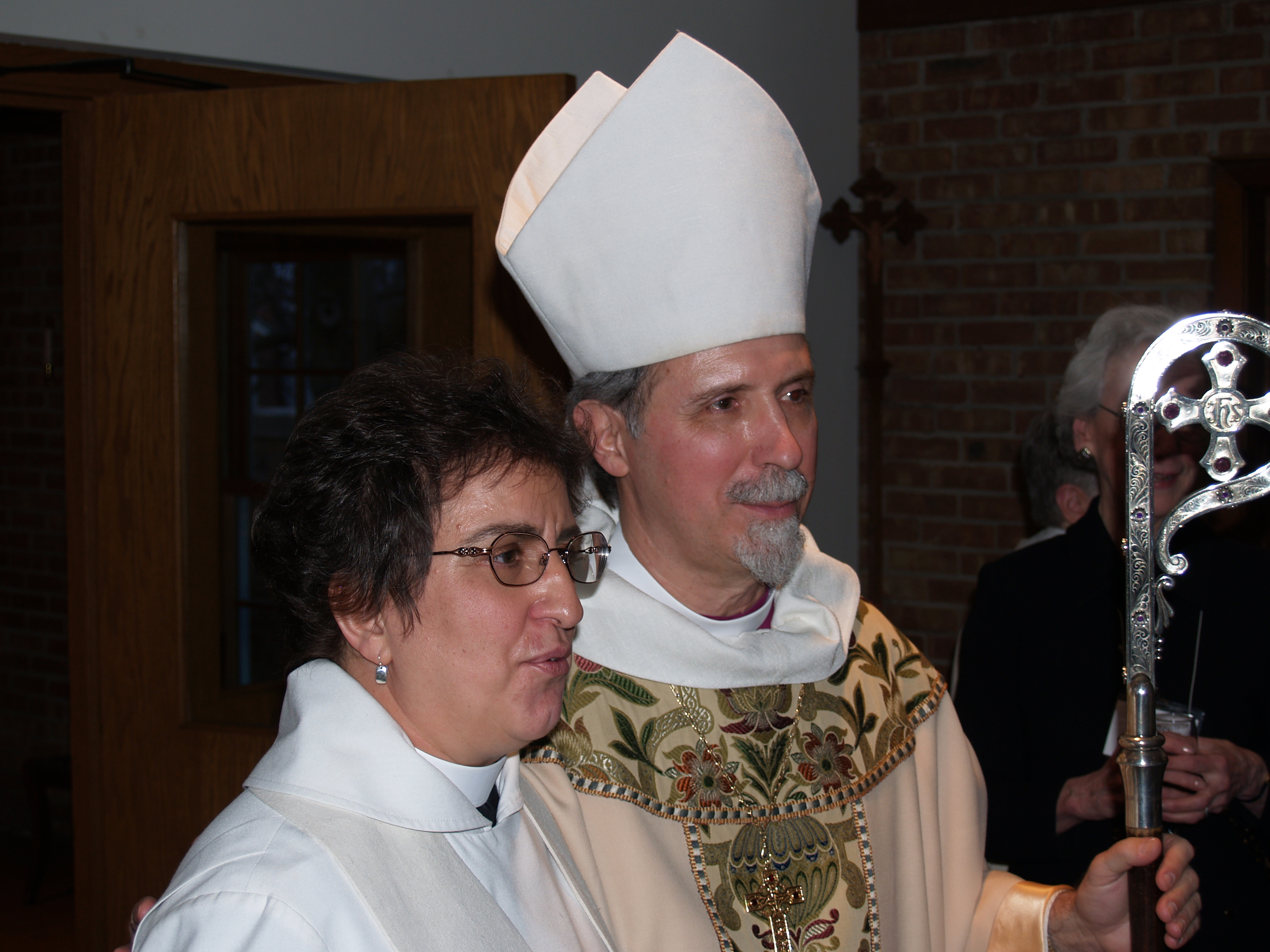
- Church: Episcopal Church
- Diocese: Chicago
- Elected: November 14, 1998
- In office: 1999–2008
- Predecessor: Frank Griswold
- Successor: Jeffrey Lee
- Other post: Assistant Bishop of Ohio

Orders
- Ordination: 1969 (priest)
- Consecration: March 13, 1999 by Frank T. Griswold

Personal details
- Born: May 6, 1943 (age 83) Rochester, New York, United States
- Denomination: Anglican
- Parents: Charles B. Persell Jr. & Dorothy Lurenz
- Spouse: Nancy Pollard Helsing
- Children: 6
- Education: Hobart College; Episcopal Divinity School

William Dailey Persell (born May 6, 1943) is an American bishop, formerly the bishop of the Episcopal Diocese of Chicago (1999–2008).

== Early life and education ==
He was born in Rochester, New York on May 6, 1943, the son of Charles B. Persell Jr., Suffragan Bishop of Albany and Dorothy Lurenz. Persell graduated from Hobart College in 1965 and the Episcopal Divinity School in 1969.

== Priest ==
Persell was ordained deacon and priest in 1969. He became assistant priest-in-charge of St Paul's Church in Tustin, California and in 1972 he became associate rector of St John's Church in Los Angeles and then rector of the same church from 1973 till 1982. In 1982 he became rector of St Ann and Holy Trinity Church in Brooklyn, New York. He also served as President of the St Ann Center for Restoration and the Arts, Inc., Brooklyn from 1983 till 1991. In 1991 he was appointed Dean of Trinity Cathedral in Cleveland, Ohio.

== Bishop ==
Persell was elected Bishop of Chicago on the third ballot on November 14, 1998, in St James' Cathedral, Chicago. He was consecrated on March 13, 1999, by Presiding Bishop Frank Griswold, who was also his predecessor in Chicago before being elected Presiding Bishop and Primate. In 2006 Persell announced that he would resign as Bishop of Chicago and asked for an election to take place to elect a new bishop. He resigned in 2008 upon the installation of Jeffrey Lee as the new bishop. After leaving the Diocese of Chicago, he became the assisting bishop of the Episcopal Diocese of Ohio.

== See also ==
- List of Episcopal bishops of the United States
- Historical list of the Episcopal bishops of the United States
