= Sheldon Munson Griswold =

American missionary bishop

The Right Reverend Sheldon Munson Griswold
- Bishop of Chicago
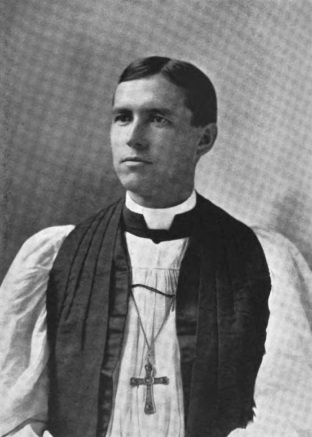
- Church: Episcopal Church
- Diocese: Chicago
- Elected: February 5, 1930
- In office: 1930
- Predecessor: Charles P. Anderson
- Successor: George Craig Stewart
- Previous posts: Missionary Bishop of Salina (1903-1917); Suffragan Bishop of Chicago (1917-1930)

Orders
- Ordination: November 1885 by William Croswell Doane
- Consecration: January 8, 1903 by William Croswell Doane

Personal details
- Born: January 8, 1861 Delhi, New York, United States
- Died: November 28, 1930 (aged 69) Evanston, Illinois, United States
- Buried: Memorial Park Cemetery in Skokie, Illinois
- Denomination: Anglican
- Parents: Walter Hanford Griswold & Ann Elizabeth Betts
- Spouse: Kate Maxwell van der Bogert

Sheldon Munson Griswold (January 8, 1861 – November 28, 1930) was missionary bishop of Salina, now the Episcopal Diocese of Western Kansas and later served as the Bishop of Chicago in 1930.

== Early life and education ==
Griswold was born on January 8, 1861, in Delhi, New York, the son of Walter Hanford Griswold (1823-1886) and Ann Elizabeth Betts (1822-1862). He studied at the Union College and graduated with a Bachelor of Arts in 1882 and later a Master of Arts in 1885. He undertook studies and training at the General Theological Seminary and graduated in 1885. He was awarded an honorary Doctor of Divinity by Union College in 1900 and another from General Theological Seminary in 1903.

== Priesthood ==
Griswold was ordained a deacon in June 1885 and priest in November of the same year. He became rector of St Augustine's Church in Ilion, New York and remained there till 1888 when he became rector of Emmanuel Episcopal Church in Little Falls, New York. He served as rector of Christ Church in Hudson, New York from 1890 till 1902.

== Bishop ==
Griswald was elected Missionary Bishop of Salina on October 23, 1902. He was consecrated on January 8, 1903, with Bishop William Croswell Doane of Albany as chief consecrator. During his time in Salina worked to build up the church in Kansas and founded Christ Church Cathedral in Salina, Kansas. He also purchased the Bishop's residence and established St Barnabas' Hospital in Salina. He enlarged and improved St. John's Military School. He also increased the number of churches in the missionary territory. On January 8, 1917, he was elected Suffragan Bishop of Chicago and in February 1930 was elected diocesan bishop. He was only Bishop of Chicago for a few months. He was a bishop associate of the Confraternity of the Blessed Sacrament. He died in Evanston Illinois in November 1930.

== Family ==
Griswold married Kate Maxwell van der Bogert (1859-1956) on October 7, 1885. He was a cousin of both Frank Griswold and Alexander Viets Griswold, both Episcopal bishops.
