= Charles P. Anderson =

Canadian bishop

The Most Reverend Charles P. Anderson
- 17th Presiding Bishop of the Episcopal Church
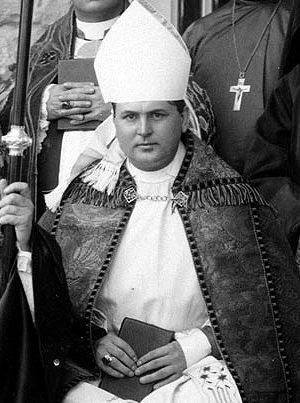
- Anderson in 1900
- Church: Episcopal Church
- Elected: November 13, 1929
- In office: 1929–1930
- Predecessor: John Gardner Murray
- Successor: James De Wolf Perry
- Other post: Bishop of Chicago (1905-1930)
- Previous post: Coadjutor Bishop of Chicago (1900-1905)

Orders
- Ordination: December 16, 1888 by John Lewis
- Consecration: February 24, 1900 by William Edward McLaren
- Rank: Presiding bishop

Personal details
- Born: September 8, 1865 Kemptville, Ontario, Canada
- Died: January 30, 1930 (aged 64) Chicago, Illinois, United States
- Buried: Phelps Cemetery, Phelps, Wisconsin
- Denomination: Anglican
- Parents: Henry Anderson, Maria Rose Sexton
- Spouse: Janet Glass
- Children: 5

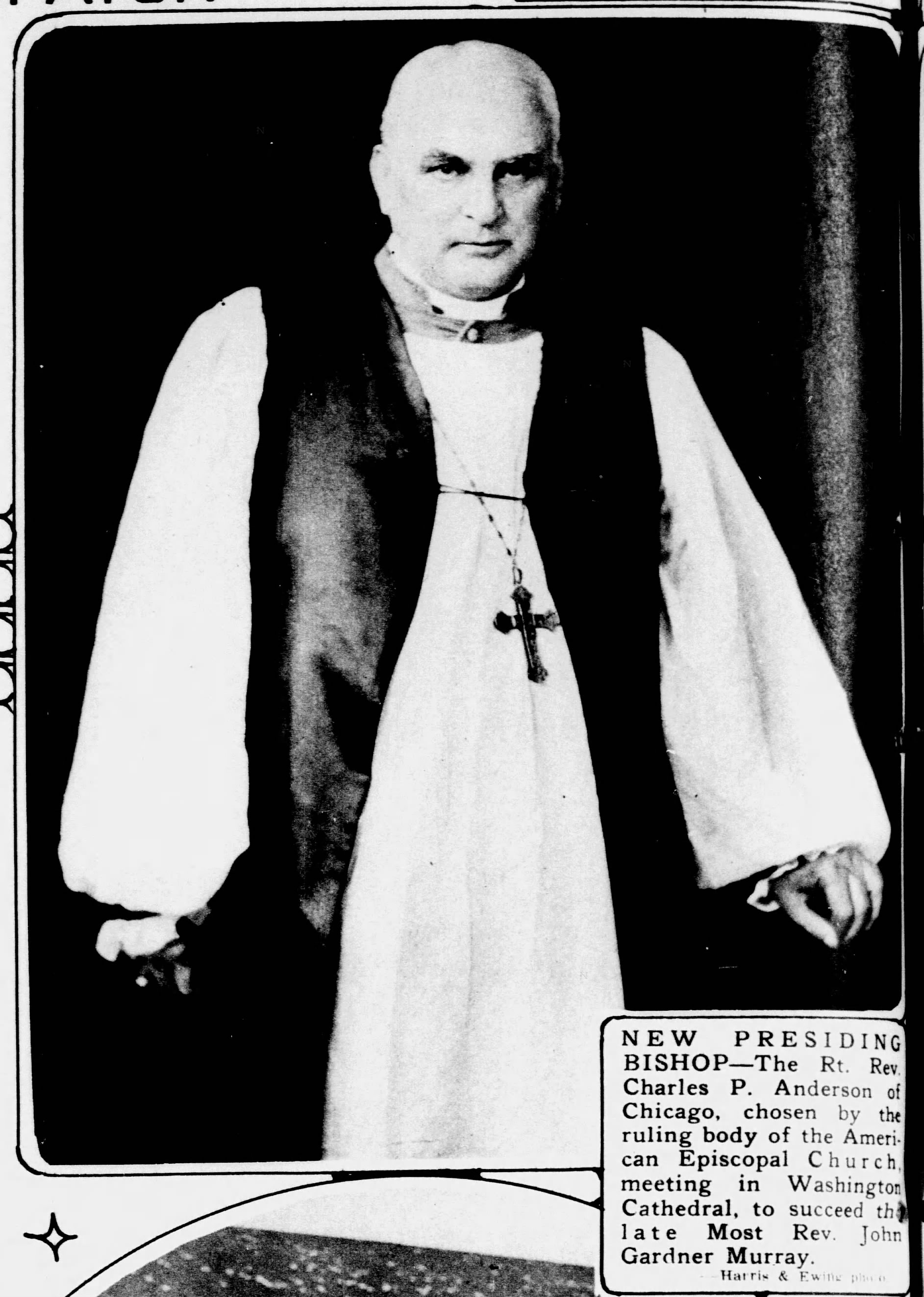
Charles P. Anderson, Presiding Bishop of the Episcopal Church, 1929 photo by Harris & Ewing

Charles Palmerston Anderson (September 8, 1865 – January 30, 1930) was the seventeenth presiding bishop of the Episcopal Church.

== Early life and education ==
He was born in Kemptville, Ontario, Canada, on September 8, 1865, the son of Henry Anderson and Maria Rose Sexton. He attended Trinity College School in Port Hope, Ontario. He was awarded a Doctor of Divinity by Trinity College, Toronto in 1900 and another by Western Theological Seminary in 1905.

== Ordained ministry ==
Anderson was ordained deacon on December 11, 1887, and priest on December 16, 1888, by Bishop John Lewis of Ontario. After his ordination to the diaconate he was in charge of the Church of St. Augustine in Beachburg, Ontario, from 1888 to 1891. In 1891 he became rector of Grace Church in Oak Park, Illinois.

=== Bishop ===
In 1900, Anderson was unanimously elected Coadjutor Bishop of Chicago during the first ballot of the special convention. He was consecrated on February 24, 1900, by the Bishop of Chicago, William Edward McLaren. He succeeded as diocesan bishop on February 19, 1905, on the death of William Edward McLaren. On November 13, 1929, Anderson was elected to the highest post in the Episcopal church, to serve as Presiding Bishop and Primate. He also retained the bishopric of Chicago simultaneously. Anderson died only a few months after his election as primate.

== Family ==
Anderson married Janet Glass of Belleville, Ontario, in 1889 and together had four daughters and one son, the latter died in WWI.

== See also ==
- List of presiding bishops of the Episcopal Church in the United States of America
- List of Episcopal bishops of the United States
- Historical list of the Episcopal bishops of the United States

Episcopal Church (USA) titles
Preceded by John Gardner Murray	17th Presiding Bishop; November 13, 1929 – January 30, 1930	Succeeded by James DeWolf Perry
Preceded by William E. McLaren	4th Bishop of Chicago; 1905–1930	Succeeded by Sheldon M. Griswold
