= Wallace E. Conkling =

American bishop

The Right Reverend Wallace Edmonds Conkling D.D., S.T.D.
- Bishop of Chicago
- Church: Episcopal Church
- Diocese: Chicago
- Elected: November 28, 1940
- In office: 1941–1953
- Predecessor: George Craig Stewart
- Successor: Gerald F. Burrill

Orders
- Ordination: 1922 by Arthur Selden Lloyd
- Consecration: February 24, 1941 by Henry St. George Tucker

Personal details
- Born: October 25, 1896 Beacon, New York, United States
- Died: August 27, 1979 (aged 82) Stuart, Florida, United States
- Buried: All Saints Episcopal Church, Jensen Beach, Florida
- Denomination: Anglican
- Parents: Charles E. Conkling & Susan M. Bright
- Spouse: Constance Lillian Sowby
- Children: 2

Wallace Edmonds Conkling (October 25, 1896 – August 27, 1979) was the seventh bishop of the Episcopal Diocese of Chicago and served from 1941 to 1953.

== Education and early career ==
Conkling was born October 25, 1896, in Matteawan (now part of Beacon, New York), the son of Charles Edmonds Conkling and Susan May Bright. He received his undergraduate degree from Williams College, his divinity degree from Philadelphia Divinity School, and a Master's from Oxford. He taught in seminaries before becoming rector of St Luke's Church in Germantown, Philadelphia, Pennsylvania, his only extended parish ministry before being elected Bishop of Chicago.

== His episcopate ==
During his 13 years as Bishop of Chicago, Conkling worked hard to build missions and to reduce the diocese's indebtedness. In 1946, he objected to efforts to liberalize the Episcopal Church's divorce canon. Illness forced him to retire in 1953. He was a bishop associate of the Confraternity of the Blessed Sacrament.

== Retirement years ==
After his retirement, Bishop Conkling moved with his wife and their two daughters to Vero Beach, Florida. His wife, the former Constance Lilian Sowby, was born in 1898 in Sleaford, Lincolnshire, England and died March 9, 1969, in Vero Beach. Both were interred on the grounds of All Saints Episcopal Church, Jensen Beach, Florida, where he had served for many years as bishop in residence.

== See also ==
- List of Bishops in the Episcopal Diocese of Chicago
- Succession of Bishops of the Episcopal Church in the United States

Episcopal Church (USA) titles
Preceded by George C. Stewart	7th Bishop of Chicago; 1941–1953	Succeeded by Gerald F. Burrill
