= Paula Clark =

21st-century American Episcopal Bishop

The Right Reverend Paula Clark
- Bishop of Chicago
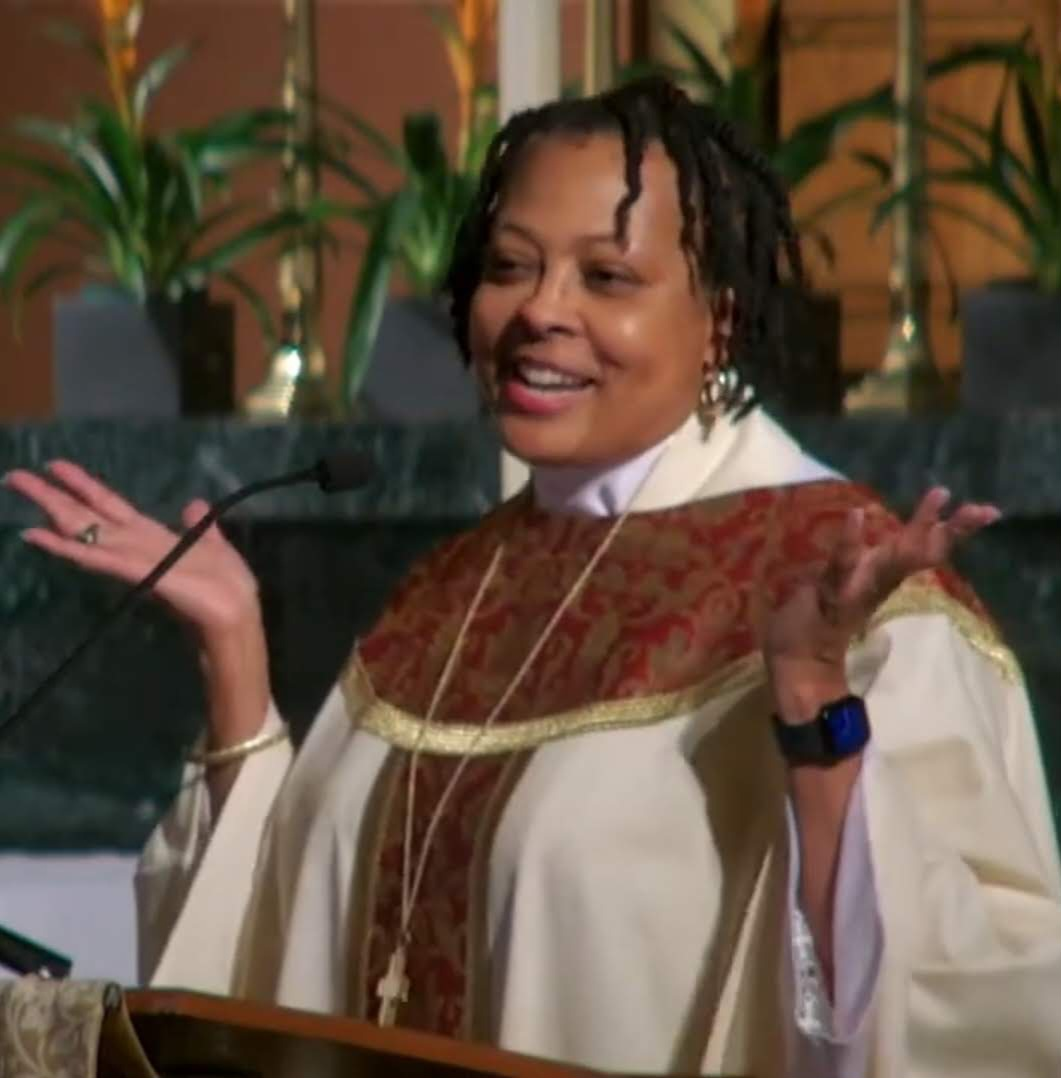
- Church: Episcopal Church
- Diocese: Chicago
- Elected: December 12, 2020
- Predecessor: Jeffrey D. Lee
- Previous posts: Canon to the Ordinary and Chief of Staff, Episcopal Diocese of Washington

Orders
- Ordination: 2004
- Consecration: September 17, 2022 by Michael Curry

Personal details
- Denomination: Anglican
- Education: Brown University

Paula E. Clark is the thirteenth bishop of the Episcopal Diocese of Chicago, serving since September 2022. At the time of her election on December 12, 2020, she was Canon to the Ordinary and Chief of Staff in the Episcopal Diocese of Washington. There were four other candidates in the election. She was elected unanimously on the fourth ballot. She is the first African American and the first woman elected bishop of Chicago.

She grew up in Washington, D.C., and her family joined an Episcopal church after they were not able to integrate into a Baptist church in their neighborhood. She was baptized by the Bishop of Washington, John T. Walker, at age 10. She is a graduate of Brown University and holds a Master of Public Policy degree from the University of California at Berkeley. She worked in the government of the District of Columbia prior to enrolling in seminary at Virginia Theological Seminary. She graduated from seminary and was ordained in 2004.

Clark was due to be consecrated on April 24, 2021, succeeding the Rt. Rev. Jeffrey D. Lee, who retired on December 31, 2020. However, the consecration was rescheduled to June 12 after Clark experienced health issues which required surgery in mid-April. It was later rescheduled to August 28, 2021. On July 28, 2021, the diocese then announced that the August 28 consecration was being postponed and would be rescheduled after Clark's heath had improved, and that the diocese would seek an assisting bishop to fulfill Clark's duties during this time. The diocese announced while Clark's health had improved her condition had warranted postponement.

In May 2022, the diocese announced that Clark would be consecrated bishop on September 17, 2022. She was subsequently consecrated on September 17 in a ceremony held at the Westin hotel in Lombard, Illinois.
