= Charles L. Street =

Charles Larrabee Street (April 25, 1891 – August 14, 1968) was a bishop suffragan of The Episcopal Church in the Diocese of Chicago.
