= Episcopal Diocese of Chicago =

Episcopal Church diocese in the US

Diocese of Chicago Diœcesis Chicagoensis

Location
- Country: United States
- Ecclesiastical province: Province V
- Subdivisions: 10 deaneries

Statistics
- Congregations: 111 (2025)
- Members: 23,687 (2025)

Information
- Denomination: Episcopal Church
- Established: March 9, 1835 (As Diocese of Illinois); May 28, 1884 (As Diocese of Chicago)
- Cathedral: St. James Cathedral
- Language: English, Spanish

Current leadership
- Bishop: Paula Clark

Map
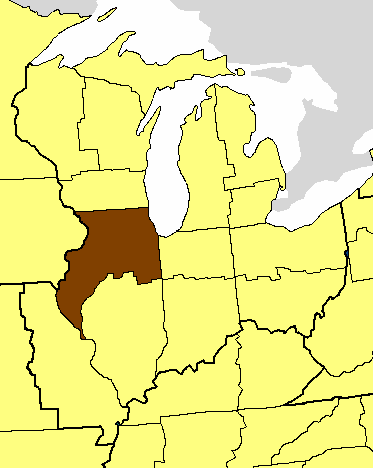
- Location of the Diocese of Chicago

Website
- episcopalchicago.org

The Episcopal Diocese of Chicago is the official organization of the Episcopal Church in Chicago and Northern Illinois, US. The diocese is served by Paula Clark, who serves as bishop of the diocese. The cathedral of the diocese is St. James Cathedral, which is the oldest Episcopal congregation in the city of Chicago.

The Diocese of Chicago covers twenty-two counties located in the northern third of the state of Illinois, stretching from the shores of Lake Michigan on the east, to the banks of the Mississippi River on the west. Its northern boundary is the state of Wisconsin; the southernmost city is Watseka, Illinois.

Between 2015 and 2025, reported membership declined from 35,422 to 23,687. Average Sunday Attendance (ASA) declined from 12,038 in 2016 to 7,289 in 2025. The 111 filing congregations of the diocese reported $28,851,440 in plate and pledge income in 2025.

== History ==
The diocese was formed in 1877 from the Diocese of Illinois, which was founded in 1835. Philander Chase, the retired bishop of Ohio, was the first bishop. He was succeeded in 1852 by Henry Whitehouse. The final bishop of Illinois was William Edward McLaren, elected in 1875, who continued as bishop of Chicago. When the Diocese of Illinois was split into three in 1877, Chicago maintained the original succession of bishops as its own. Two other dioceses, Quincy and Springfield, elected their own bishops.

== Present day ==
The diocese is far more ethnically diverse than the Episcopal Church at-large. There are four Hispanic congregations, one of which is located in the near western suburbs of Chicago. In addition, four congregations outside Chicago provide Spanish language services, and two others share their facilities with congregations of the Philippine Independent Church. There is one Korean American congregation, and the diocese also serves eight African-American congregations.

The 25th presiding bishop of the Episcopal Church, Frank Tracy Griswold, was bishop of Chicago when he was elected in 1997.

== Diocesan bishops of Illinois and of Chicago ==
Bishops of Illinois
From	Until	Incumbent	Notes
1835	1852	Philander Chase	Translated from Ohio.
1852	1874	Henry John Whitehouse	Coadjutor since 1851.
1875	1877	William Edward McLaren	Called Edward (December 15, 1831, Geneva, NY – February 19, 1905, New York, NY); diocese split; became Bishop of Chicago.
Bishops of Chicago
1877	1905	William Edward McLaren	Hitherto Bishop of Illinois.
1905	1930	Charles P. Anderson	Coadjutor since 1900.
1930	1930	Sheldon Munson Griswold	(January 8, 1861, Delhi, NY – November 28, 1930, Evanston, IL); previously missionary bishop of Salina.
1930	1940	George Craig Stewart	(August 18, 1879, Saginaw, MI – May 2, 1940, Chicago, IL); coadjutor since 1930.
1941	1953	Wallace E. Conkling	
1954	1971	Frank Burrill	
1971	1987	James W. Montgomery	James Winchester Montgomery (born May 29, 1921); coadjutor since 1965.
1987	1998	Frank T. Griswold	Coadjutor since 1985.
1998	1999	Herbert A. Donovan, Jr.	Herbert Alcorn "Herb" Donovan, Junior (born July 14, 1931); provisional bishop; retired Bishop of Arkansas.
1999	2008	William D. Persell	
2008	2020	Jeffrey D. Lee	Jeffrey Dean Lee
2022	Present	Paula Clark	

== Other bishops of the diocese ==
Bishops suffragan
From	Until	Incumbent	Notes
1911	1915	William Edward Toll, suffragan bishop	(died June 28, 1915)
1917	1917	Sheldon Munson Griswold, suffragan bishop	
1939	1947	Edwin J. Randall, suffragan bishop	Edwin Jarvis Randall (October 24, 1869, Oconomowoc, WI – June 13, 1962, Evanston, IL)
1949	1963	Charles L. Street, suffragan bishop	Charles Larrabee Street
1962	1965	James W. Montgomery, suffragan bishop	
1972	1984	Quintin E. Primo, Jr., suffragan bishop	Quintin Ebenezer Primo, Junior (July 1, 1913, Freedom Grove, GA – January 14, 1998, Hockessin, DE); later interim bishop of Delaware.
1990	1997	William W. Wiedrich, suffragan bishop	Called Bill (born August 19, 1931)
Assistant bishops
2000	2011	Victor A. Scantlebury, assistant bishop	Victor Alfonso Scantlebury (born March 31, 1945, Colón, Panama); previously suffragan in Panama.
2012	2015	C. Christopher Epting, assistant bishop	(born November 26, 1946); previously bishop of Iowa, Deputy for Ecumenical and Interreligious Relations

== List of deaneries ==
- Aurora Deanery
- Chicago-North Deanery
- Chicago-South Deanery
- Elgin Deanery
- Evanston Deanery
- Joliet Deanery
- Oak Park Deanery
- Peoria Deanery
- Rockford Deanery
- Waukegan Deanery

== See also ==
- List of Bishops in the Episcopal Diocese of Chicago
- Episcopal Diocese of Springfield
- Episcopal Diocese of Quincy
