= St. James Cathedral (Chicago) =

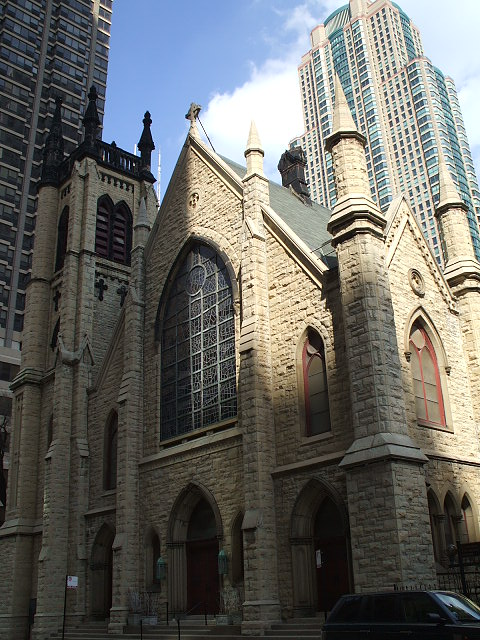

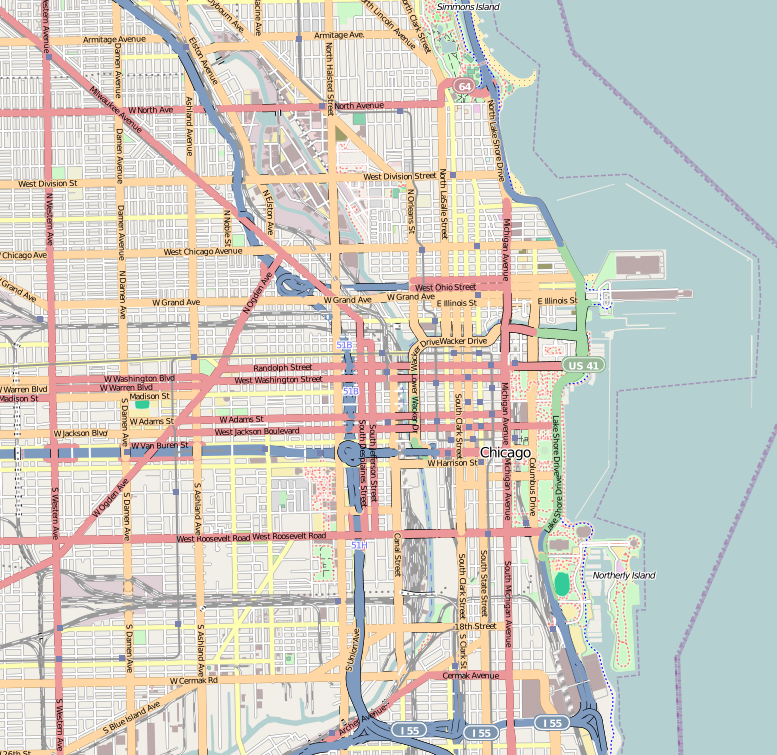
- Location in central Chicago
- 41°53′41″N 87°37′35″W
- Location: 65 East Huron Street; Chicago, Illinois
- Country: United States
- Denomination: Episcopal Church in the United States of America
- Website: www.saintjamescathedral.org

History
- Founded: 1834

Architecture
- Architect(s): Faulkner & Clarke, architects; restoration, Walker Johnson, Holabird & Root, architects
- Style: Gothic Revival
- Completed: 1857

Administration
- Diocese: Chicago

Clergy
- Bishop: Paula Clark
- Dean: Lisa Hackney-James (Provost)

St. James Cathedral is the mother church of the Episcopal Church in the United States of America Diocese of Chicago in Chicago, Illinois. The cathedral stands at the corner of Huron Street and Wabash Avenue in the River North neighborhood of the Near North Side area of the city.

The cathedral reported 988 members in 2023 and 662 members in 2025. Plate and pledge income for the congregation in 2025 was $1,111,143 with average Sunday attendance (ASA) of 314. This was a relative decrease from ASA of 353 persons reported in 2020.

== History ==
It is the oldest church in the Chicago area of the Anglican Communion and Episcopal tradition, having been founded in 1834. Abraham Lincoln and his wife Mary Todd Lincoln attended church at St. James on November 25, 1860, about three weeks after he was elected president; he was joined by many Chicago dignitaries as well as Vice President-elect Hannibal Hamlin.

Originally built as a parish church, the original St. James building was mostly destroyed in 1871 in the Great Chicago Fire. Only the bell tower survived, and this was incorporated into the rebuilt church, including the soot-stained stones around the top of the tower which remain black today. St. James received the status of cathedral in 1928 after the Cathedral Church of St. Peter and St. Paul was destroyed in a fire in 1921, but the arrangement was terminated in 1931. On May 3, 1955, St. James was again designated the cathedral and was formally set apart on June 4, 1955. The church is led by the Episcopal Bishop of Chicago.

Together with the Roman Catholic Holy Name Cathedral on State Street two blocks to its northwest, the two churches form the Cathedral District of Chicago.

== List of Rectors and Deans ==
The following served St. James Parish as its rector prior to its consecration as a cathedral:

- 1834-1843: The Rev. Isaac W. Hallam
- 1843-1844: The Rev. William F. Walker
- 1844-1849: The Rev. Ezra B. Kellogg
- 1849-1865: The Rev. Robert H. Clarkson
- 1867-1871: The Rev. Joseph H. Rylance
- 1871-1872: The Rev. Hugh M. Thompson
- 1872-1875: The Rev. Arthur Brooks
- 1875-1879: The Rev. Samuel Smith Harris
- 1880-1882: The Rev. Frederick Courtney
- 1883-1890: The Rev. William H. Vibbert
- 1891-1894: The Rev. Floyd W. Tomkins
- 1895-1922: The Rev. James S. Stone
- 1924-1950: The Rev. Duncan H. Browne
- 1950-1955: The Rev. Howard S. Kennedy

The following served the cathedral as its dean:

- 1955-1964: The Very Rev. Howard S. Kennedy
- 1964-1971: The Very Rev. William F. Maxwell, Jr.
- 1972-1979: The Very Rev. James E. Carroll
- 1979-1990: The Very Rev. Charles R. Greene
- 1991-2000: The Very Rev. Todd D. Smelser
- 2001-2005 The Very Rev. Ralph T. Blackman
- 2006-2014: The Very Rev. Joy E. Rogers
- 2015–2022: The Very Rev. Dominic Barrington
- 2022-Current: The Very Rev. Lisa Hackney-James

== Gallery ==
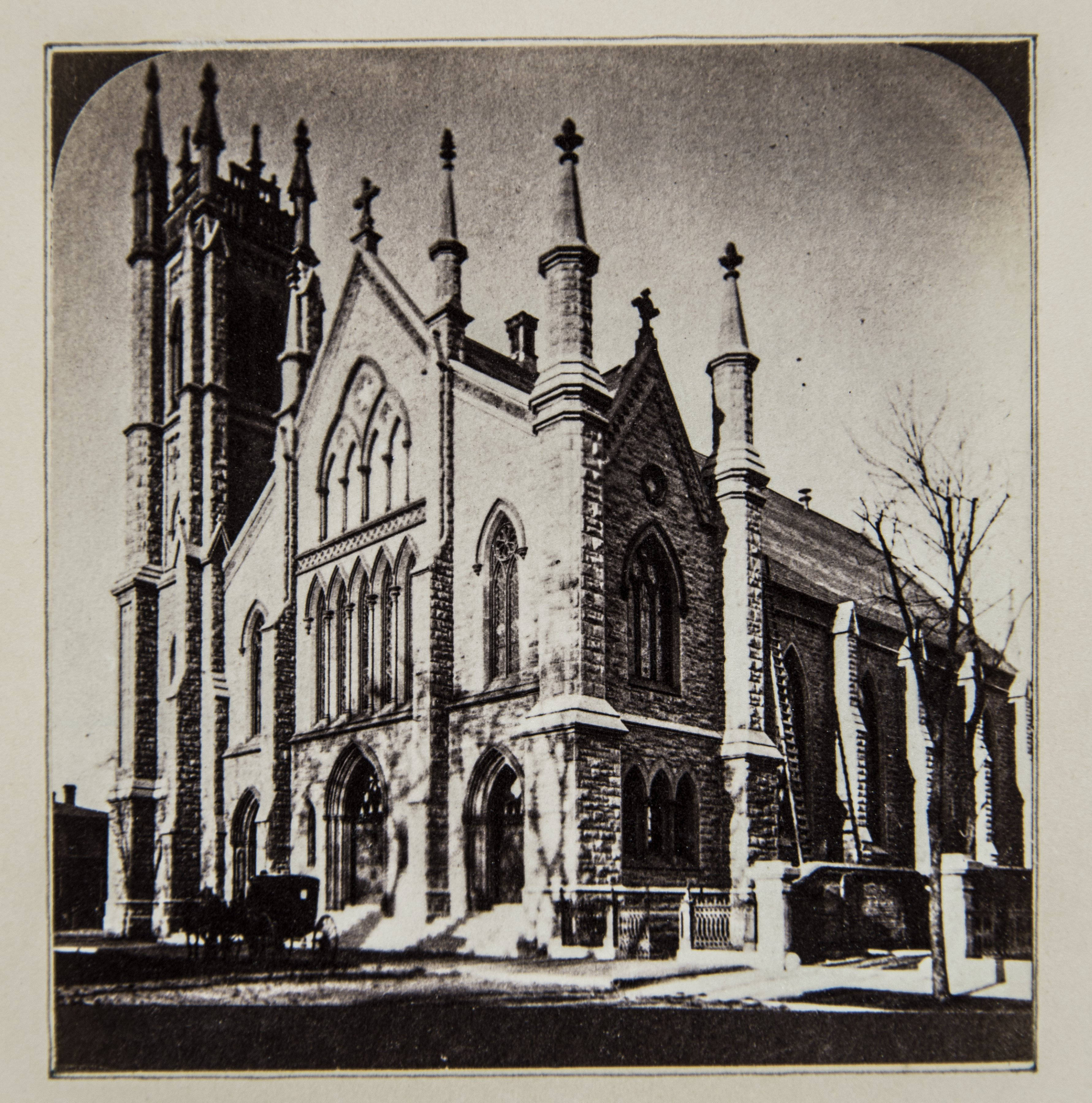
Original church pre-fire

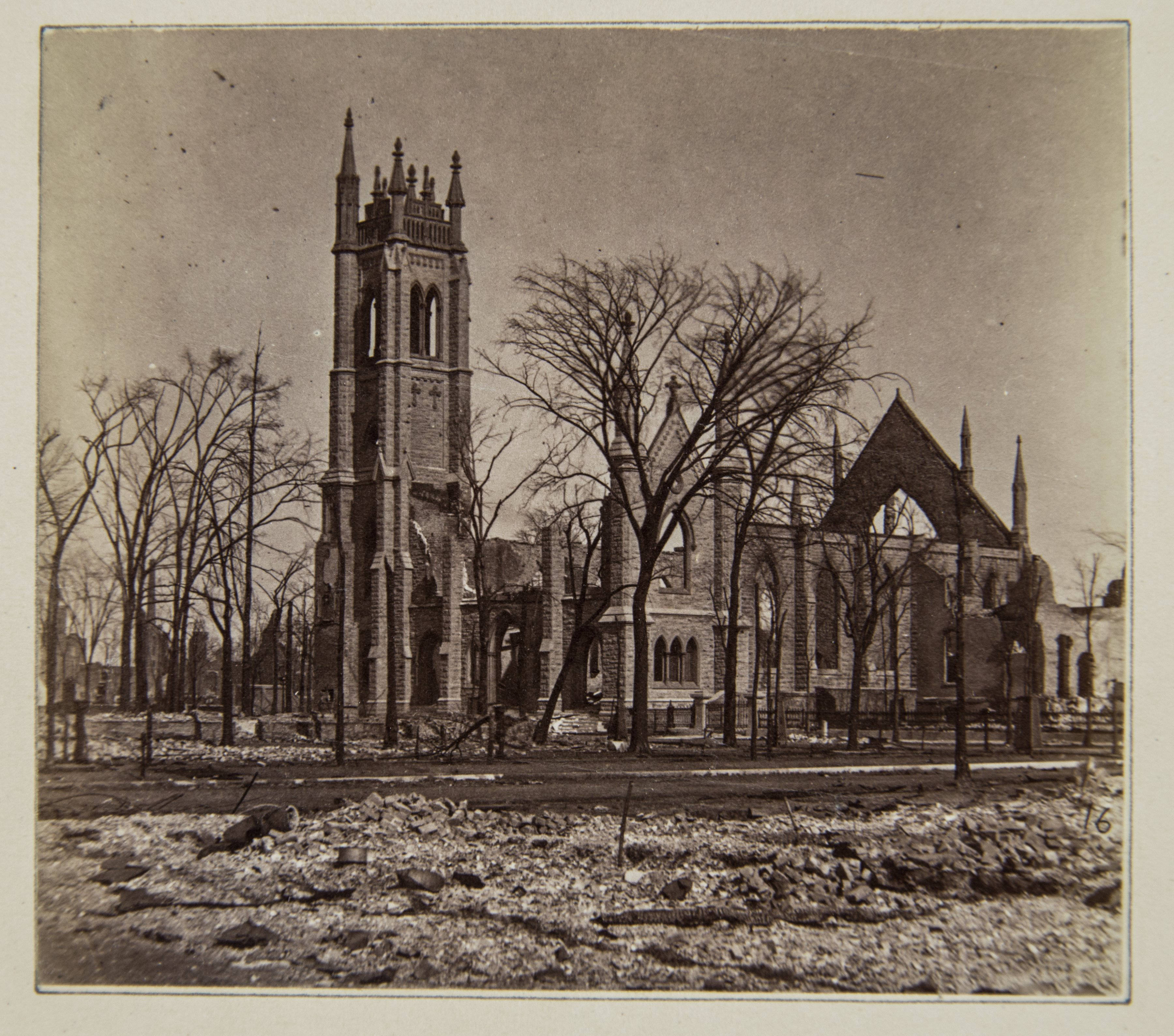
Remains of the original church after the Great Fire of 1871

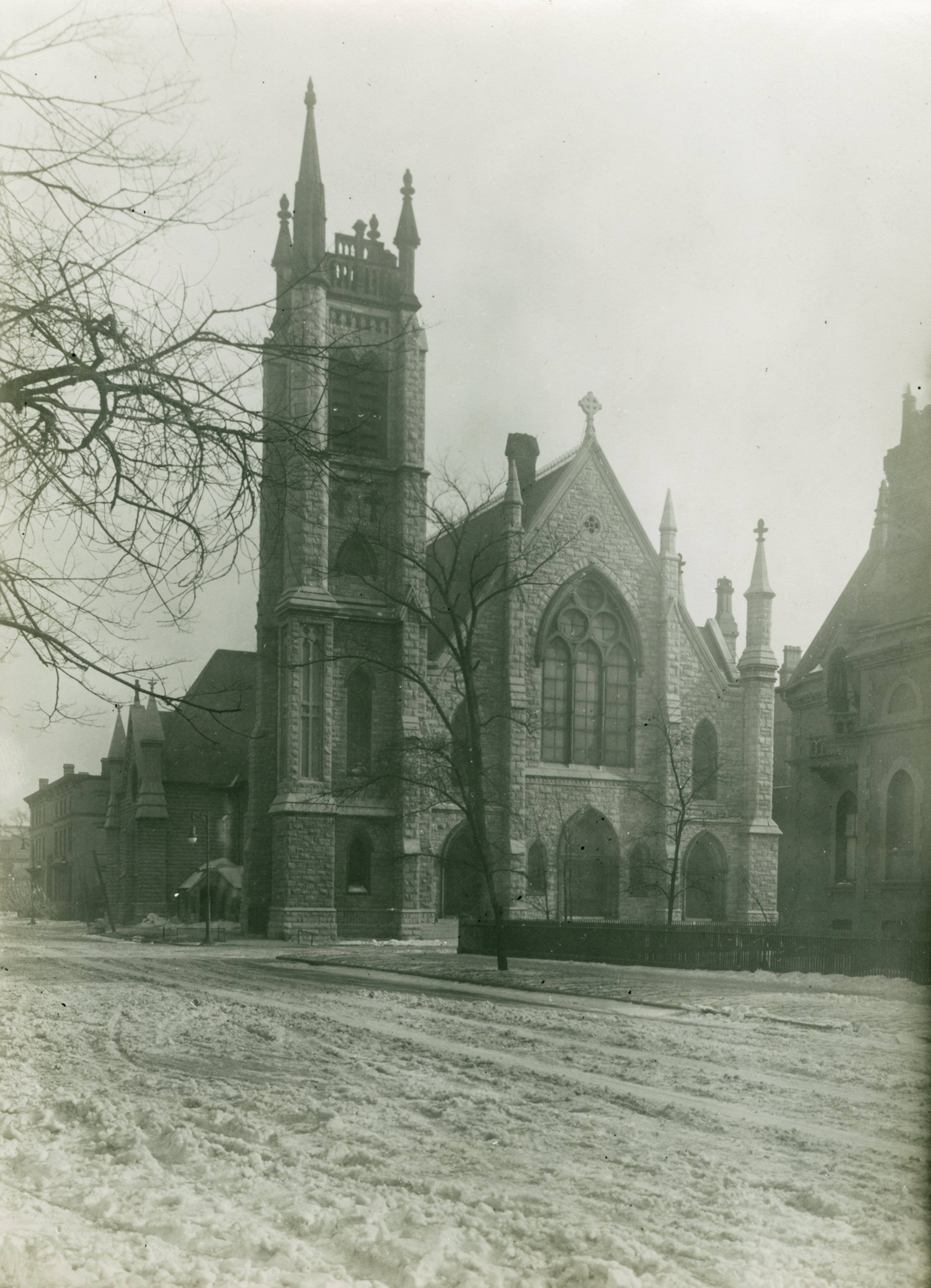
Rebuilt church in 1913

== See also ==
- List of the Episcopal cathedrals of the United States
- List of cathedrals in the United States
