= Calvary Episcopal Church (Golden, Colorado) =

Historic church in Colorado, United States

- U.S. National Register of Historic Places
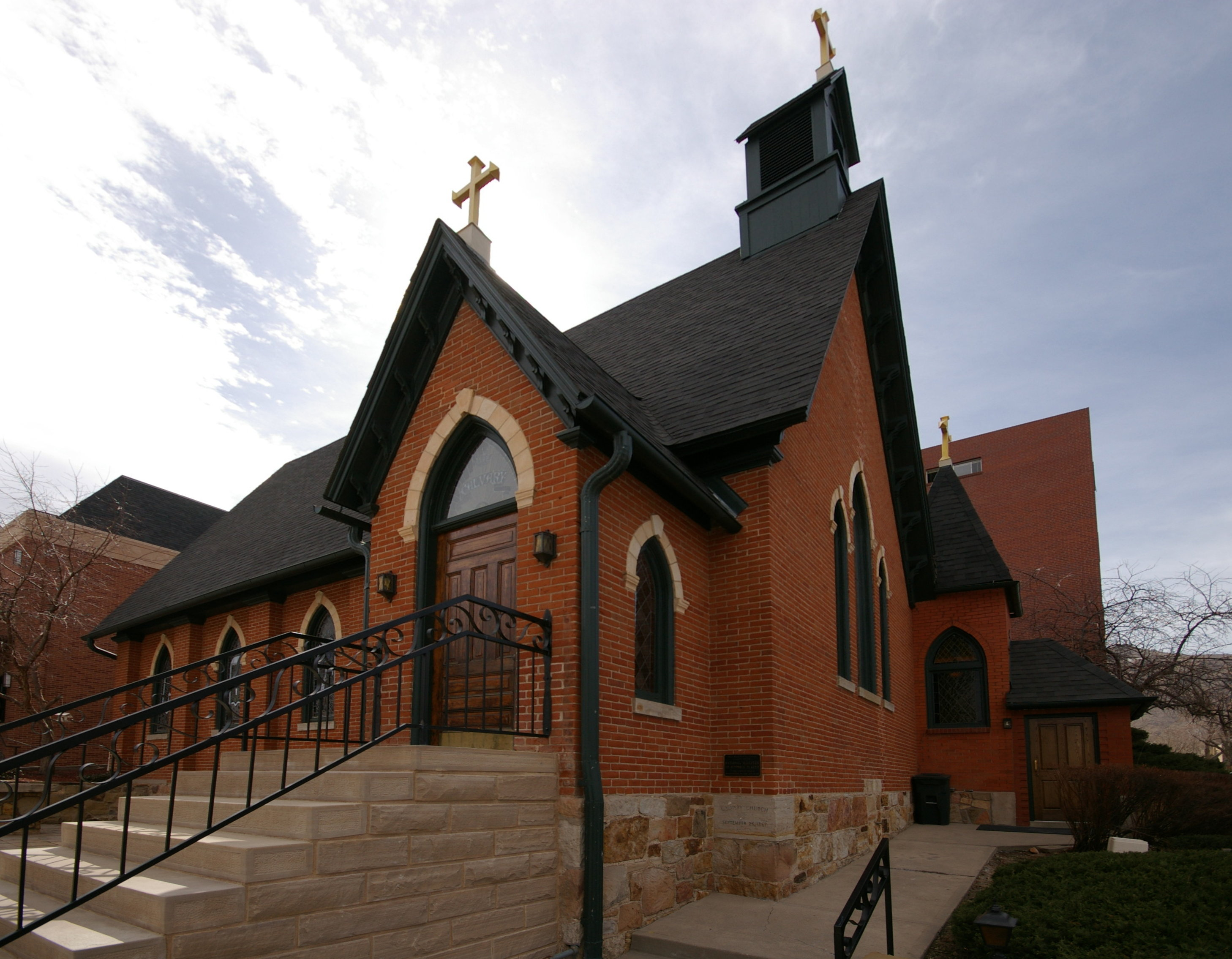
- Location: 1300 Arapahoe Street; Golden, Colorado 80401
- Coordinates: 39.7537°N 105.2217°W
- Built: 1867
- Architect: Member original church vestry
- NRHP reference No.: 95000186
- Added to NRHP: March 3, 1995

Calvary Episcopal Church is a Gothic Revival style chapel dating to the pioneer days of Golden, Colorado, United States. It is the oldest continuously used Episcopal church in Colorado, and is listed on the National Register of Historic Places. The church reported 916 members in 2019 and 630 members in 2023; no membership statistics were reported in 2024 parochial reports. Plate and pledge income reported for the congregation in 2024 was $1,175,110 with average Sunday attendance (ASA) of 304 persons.

== History ==
The congregation of Calvary Episcopal Church was begun by the Episcopal missionary Bishop George Maxwell Randall, who later would establish the Colorado School of Mines. This chapel, built upon land donated by William A.H. Loveland, was constructed in 1867-68, and has been in use by the congregation ever since. It was designed by a member of the original church vestry, and is the earliest known work constructed by prominent regional builder John H. Parsons. Its interior woodwork, styled like that of Anglican churches, was carved by Robert Millikin and Woods. The church bell was given to the congregation in 1870 by the wife of George A. Jarvis, whom Jarvis Hall college was named after. Calvary's baptismal font was carved by George Morrison, for whom Morrison, Colorado was named. Upon the beloved bishop Randall's death in 1873, the congregation pledged to preserve this chapel as a monument to his service to Colorado. Several additions have since been built to the structure, including its Guild Hall (1902, using bricks recycled from Standley Hall that stood across from the Astor House (Golden, Colorado)), projecting chancel (1909), and classroom addition (1954). The original chapel has been restored in an ongoing project from the 1990s-2000s. It is listed on the Golden, Colorado and National historic registers.

Noted parishioners of Calvary have included George West, Edward L. Berthoud, and the Coors family. The brewery's founder donated the church pews and north windows.

== See also ==
- National Register of Historic Places listings in Jefferson County, Colorado
