= Colorado University Schools =

Defunct education campus in Colorado, USA

Coordinates: 39.7629°N 105.2275°W

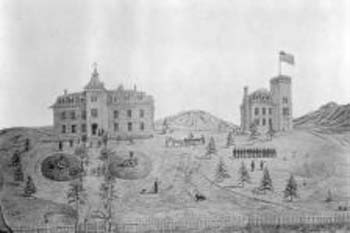
Jarvis Hall, original School of Mines building, and the Colorado University Schools campus in 1871.

The Colorado University Schools campus was the multi-collegiate campus in Golden, Colorado, spearheaded by the visionary missionary Bishop George Maxwell Randall of the Episcopal Church.

== History ==
Having a ministerial passion for education and seeing great need for it in frontier Colorado Territory, Randall first established the Wolfe Hall collegiate school for girls in 1868, then in 1869 received a gift from Charles Clark Welch to begin this collegiate campus for boys. This land was on a small plateau overlooking Golden to the north, that is now annexed within the city limits.

=== Colleges ===
Three colleges were opened by Randall and the Episcopal Church here:

- Jarvis Hall in 1870
- Matthews Hall in 1872
- Territorial School of Mines in 1873, the present day Colorado School of Mines.

Jarvis Hall was a liberal arts, grammar and military school. Matthews Hall was a divinity school to train future Episcopal clergy for the region. Randall strongly felt a School of Mines would be vital to the future of Colorado because of its mining economy.

=== Demise ===
After Randall died in 1873 the campus began to be dismantled, from efforts within the church striving to remove its colleges to Denver. In 1874 the School of Mines was sold to the Colorado Territory government, after years of controversy over government support of a church-owned college. On 4 April 1878, Jarvis Hall burned, knocking a hole in the center of the campus. Several days later on 8 April Matthews Hall was burned by arsonists. This effectively destroyed the campus. The two schools and the Territorial School of Mines quickly moved to the Loveland Block in downtown Golden. After a short return by the School of Mines back to its original building in 1879, it then moved to its new permanent campus in the city.

The campus' plateau site was fully acquired by the new state government in 1880. The remaining original School of Mines Building became the center of the Colorado State Industrial School for Boys. This original Mines building was destroyed by fire in 1893.

== See also ==
- Colorado School of Mines topics
- Universities and colleges in Colorado
