= Matthews Hall (Colorado) =

Defunct school of divinity in Colorado, USA

Coordinates: 39.7484°N 105.2177°W

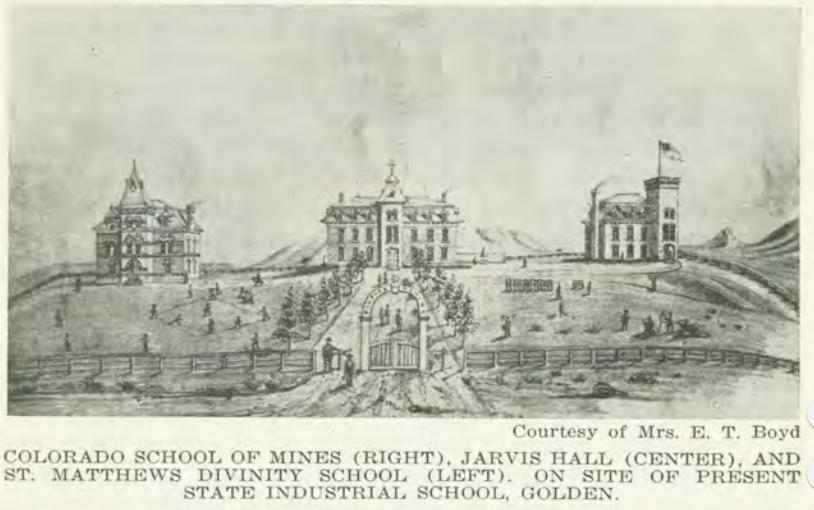
Colorado School of Mines, Jarvis Hall Collegiate School, and Matthews Hall Divinity School

Matthews Hall was an Episcopal divinity school of higher education at the Colorado University Schools campus at Golden, Colorado.

During the history of the Colorado Territory, Bishop George M. Randall sought to develop Episcopalian educational facilities in Colorado, where Randall was an Episcopal missionary for the Diocese of Colorado, New Mexico, and Wyoming. Randall, with the help of benefactors like George A. Jarvis, helped establish the Colorado University Schools which included a school of mines (which later became the state-run Colorado School of Mines), the Jarvis Hall secondary school, and the Matthews Hall school of theology.

Built in 1872 by the missionary Bishop George Maxwell Randall, Matthews Hall's purpose was the train future Episcopal clergy for work in the frontier region of Colorado. The school was named after its major benefactor, Nathan Matthews, Esq. of Boston. Its building, designed by architect Thayer from Boston, was created to complement is sister schools Jarvis Hall and the Colorado School of Mines on campus. It was a beautiful combination Gothic and Second Empire styled brick edifice with a central bell tower entrance and ornamental brickwork. Inside, Matthews Hall featured on the first floor a chapel, professors' rooms and lavatory; the second floor housed a 1,500 volume theological library, recitation rooms and students' rooms; and the third floor housed students' dormitories. The building starting in 1873 also housed the natural history wing of the Jarvis Hall Museum, organized by prominent Matthews Hall graduate Arthur Lakes. For most of its existence Matthews Hall was headed by Rev. Thomas Lloyd Bellam, and had an initial student body of 10 students.

Graduates included Francis William Loveland and architect James H. Gow, and a fire caused by a defective flue burned Jarvis Hall down on April 4, 1878. After an arson attack on sister school Matthews Hall four days later, professor in charge Thomas Lloyd Bellam decided to combine the schools as one. Jarvis Hall was temporarily relocated to the Loveland Block in downtown Golden, and before the end of 1878 Bellam funded a new Jarvis Hall building (now 921 19th Street in Golden). The Jarvis Hall Museum, reduced to only its geological wing housed in the School of Mines building, has gone on to become the Colorado School of Mines Geology Museum.
