= George M. Randall (bishop) =

American bishop

The Right Reverend George Maxwell Randall S.T.D.
- Missionary Bishop of Colorado and Parts Adjacent
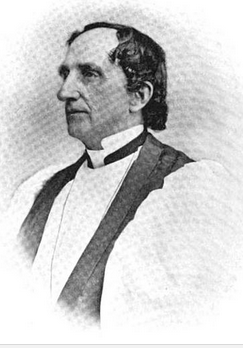
- Church: Episcopal Church
- Diocese: Colorado
- Elected: October 1865
- In office: 1865–1873
- Successor: John Franklin Spalding

Orders
- Ordination: November 2, 1839 by Alexander Viets Griswold
- Consecration: December 28, 1865 by John Henry Hopkins

Personal details
- Born: November 23, 1810 Warren, Rhode Island, United States
- Died: September 28, 1873 (aged 62) Denver, Colorado, United States
- Buried: South Burial Ground, Warren, Rhode Island
- Denomination: Anglican
- Parents: Samuel Randall & Martha Maxwell
- Spouse: Elizabeth Hoar (m. 1839)
- Education: General Theological Seminary
- Alma mater: Brown University

George Maxwell Randall (November 23, 1810 – September 28, 1873) (Note: Banyard provided a September 28, 1874, date of death. His death was reported in the New York Times as September 29, 1873.) was the Episcopal bishop of Missionary District of Colorado and Parts Adjacent.

== Early life and studies ==
George Randall was born in Warren, Rhode Island, on November 23, 1810, the son of Samuel and Martha (née Maxwell) Randall. He attended Brown University, where he graduated in 1835. He then undertook theological studies at the General Theological Seminary, from which he graduated in 1838. George A. Jarvis, who was a long-time friend that became a benefactor for a number of Randall's programs, donated monies to fund Randall's education. During seminary Randall helped start a Sunday school program.

== Religious career ==
=== Ordaination ===
In his hometown of Warren, Randall was ordained a deacon in the Episcopal Church on July 17, 1838, and became a priest on November 2, 1839.

=== Early ministry ===
Randall began his ordained ministry by serving as the rector of the Church of the Ascension in Fall River, Massachusetts. He moved from there to become the rector of the Church of the Messiah in Boston in 1844. He remained in this position until he was elevated to the episcopate.

While serving in Massachusetts, he was a diocesan deputy to the General Convention from 1850 until 1865. In 1862 and 1865 he was elected the Secretary to the House of Clerical and Lay Deputies, to which he had previously served as Assistant Secretary.

In 1856 he received his Doctor of Sacred Theology degree from Brown University. For many years he was the editor of The Christian Witness and Church Advocate and published many tracts including Why I Am a Churchman.

=== Episcopate ===
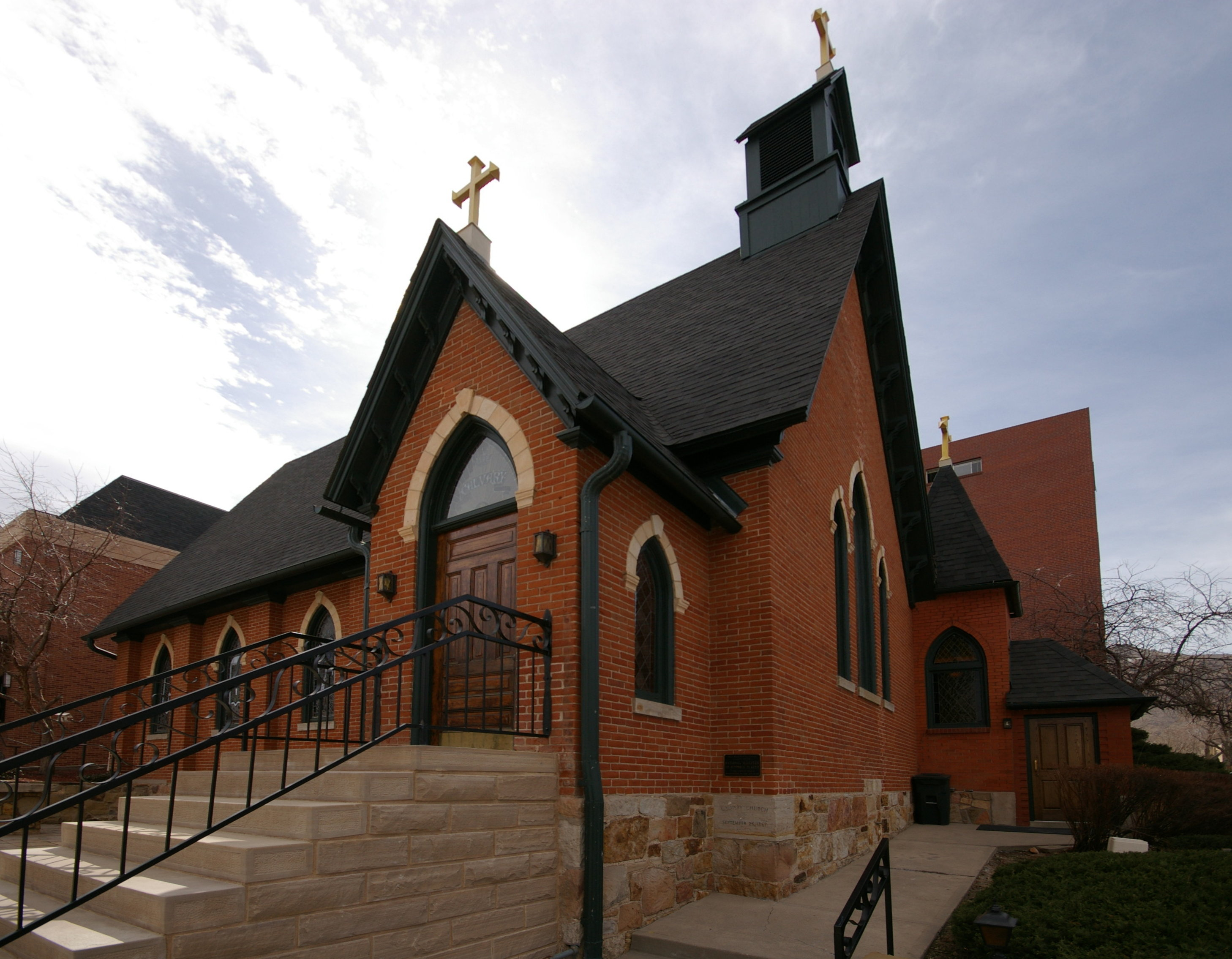
Calvary Church, Golden, Colorado

Randall was consecrated as Missionary Bishop of the Missionary District of Colorado and Parts Adjacent in Trinity Church, Boston, on December 28, 1865, by Presiding Bishop John Henry Hopkins, assisted by Bishops Benjamin Smith and Manton Eastburn, among others. His jurisdiction originally contained the territories of Colorado, Idaho, Montana, and Wyoming. In 1866, Montana and Idaho were removed, while New Mexico was added to the district. Upon arriving in Colorado, he helped establish Calvary Church in Golden.

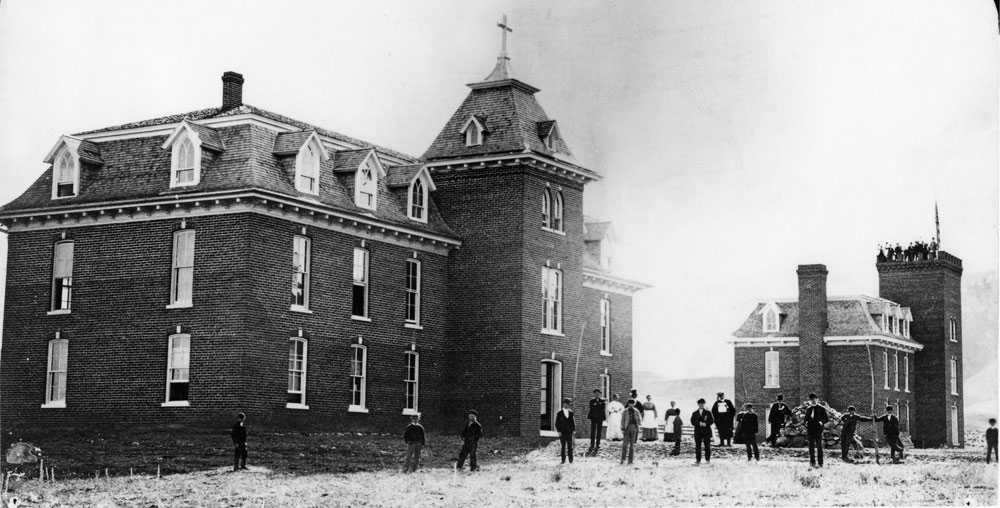
Jarvis Hall (on the left) and Territorial School of Mines in Golden, Colorado, before 1878

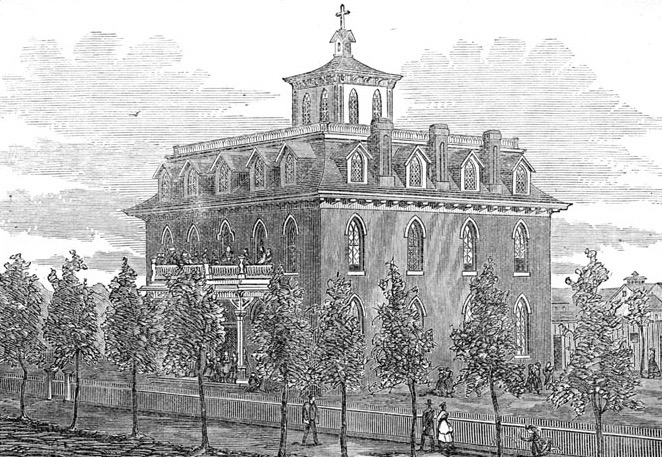
Wolfe Hall, an Episcopalian academy for girls in Denver, Colorado, 1871

Noting the lack of higher education in the territory, he also helped established the Colorado University Schools which included a school of mines (which later became the state-run Colorado School of Mines), the Jarvis Hall secondary school, and the Matthews Hall school of theology. George A. Jarvis, the largest contributor to the territorial activities of Bishop Randall, donated funds for the development of Wolfe Hall, an Episcopal school for girls in Denver. It was located at Champa and 17th Street. John D. Wolfe of New York, the second largest donor and the namesake for Wolfe Hall, which was built by 1871. Bishop Randall lived there with his wife.

=== Publications ===
- George Maxwell Randall (1861). Missions- the Church's Work: Its Mode and Measure. E. P. Dutton & Company.
- George Maxwell Randall (Bishop.) (1867). The Full Proof of an Apostolic Ministry: A Sermon, in Trinity Chapel, New York, May 1, 1867 ... on the Occasion of the Consecration of Daniel S. Tuttle, as Missionary Bishop of Montana. E.P. Dutton.

== Personal life ==
An active Freemason, Randall was raised in Washington Lodge No. 3 in Warren, was Grand Master of the Grand Lodge of Massachusetts from 1852 to 1854, and was Grand Orator of the Grand Lodge of Colorado in 1872.

Randall died from pneumonia at his residence in Denver in 1873, leaving behind a wife, Elizabeth Hoar. He was buried in Warren, Rhode Island.

== Sources ==
- Armentrout, Don S. & Robert Boak Slocum (2000). "Colorado, Diocese of " in An Episcopal Dictionary of the Church: A User-Friendly Reference for Episcopalians. New York: Church Publishing Incorporated. Retrieved 04-30-2013.
- Bancroft, Caroline (October 1949). "George A. Jarvis, of Jarvis Hall: Colorado's New York Friend" (PDF). Colorado Magazine. Vol. XXVI, no. 4. Denver: The State Historical Society of Colorado. pp. 279–280. Archived from the original (PDF) on July 28, 2016.
- Baynard, Samuel Harr (1 June 2003). History of the Supreme Council of the 33. Kessinger Publishing. p. 340. ISBN 978-0-7661-6549-6. Retrieved 30 April 2013.
- Batterson, Hermon Griswold (1891). A Sketch-book of the American Episcopate Philadelphia: J. B. Lippencott & Co. Retrieved 04-29-2013.
- Denslow, William R. (1957) 10,000 Famous Freemasons Richmond, Va.: Macoy Publishing & Masonic Supply Co., Inc. Retrieved 04-29-2013.
- Hugg, Henry Warren (1895) History of Freemasonry in Rhode Island. Providence: E. L. Freeman & Son. Retrieved 04-30-2013.
- Bishop George M. Randall obituary in the New York Times, September 29, 1873. Retrieved 04-29-2013.
- Bishops of the Diocese of the Rio Grande at The Institute of Historical Survey Foundation. Retrieved 04-29-2013.
- A Brief History of Calvary Church. Retrieved 04-29-2013.
