= Souad Naji Al-Azzawi =

Iraqi academic and environmentalist

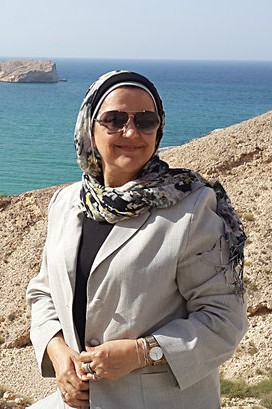
- Al-Azzawi 2017
- Born: Baghdad, Iraq
- Education: University of Mosul; Colorado School of Mines
- Awards: The Nuclear-Free Future Award 2003; The Van Tyle Award, Colorado School of Mines 1989; The Iraqi National Award for Distinguished Patents 2001; The Scientific Staff Award from the Iraqi Ministry of Higher Education 2000 2001 2002
- Scientific career
- Fields: Environmental Engineering, Hazardous Waste Contamination
- Workplaces: Al-Mustansiriya University; University of Baghdad; Al-Khawarizmi Engineering College for Advanced Technology; Cordoba Private University
- Thesis: An integrated approach to subsurface heterogeneity measurement for three dimensions ground water flow and contaminant transport modeling (1990)
- Doctoral advisor: Alan Keith Turner

Souad Naji Al-Azzawi (Arabic: سعاد ناجي العزاوي) is an Iraqi environmentalist and academic researcher in various engineering disciplines, in addition to having established and assisted in the establishment of multiple research & academic institutions in Iraq. With more than 50 published scientific papers on topics ranging from water desalination, nuclear waste management, and Depleted Uranium contamination among others, she is a distinguished member of the Iraqi scientific community and the first Arab to receive the Nuclear-Free Future Award.

== Education ==
Al-Azzawi graduated with a B.Sc. in civil engineering from University of Mosul, Iraq (1971–1976). After spending 6 years practicing in various structural engineering and engineering management roles, she relocated to the United States of America to pursue an M.S. in Geotechnical Engineering from Colorado School of Mines, Golden, Colorado, US (1983–1986) followed immediately by a Ph.D. in geological environmental engineering (1986–1989) with a dissertation titled: “An integrated approach to subsurface heterogeneity measurement for three dimensions ground water flow and contaminant transport modeling.” ushering in her career in hazardous and radioactive waste modeling and management.

== Career and academia ==
Al-Azzawi studied geological and environmental engineering in the US, after which she returned to Iraq immediately before the Second Gulf War to be appointed as a faculty member in the civil engineering department, College of Engineering, University of Baghdad, 1991–1996, during which she taught several undergraduate and graduate studies courses.

She was appointed assistant dean of scientific affairs in the College of Engineering, University of Baghdad from 1995 to 1996. In 1996 she was appointed director of Reconstruction Researches Center, University of Baghdad, for 4 years.

In 1997, she founded and then subsequently as appointed the acting head of the Environmental Engineering Department for Research and Graduate Studies, College of Engineering, University of Baghdad, during which she was also the director of the Environmental Consulting Office in the same university, and acting director of the doctorate program in Department Environmental Engineering which she was confirmed to by the year 2000. Her work in the Environmental Consulting Office included supervising projects and studies related to environmental engineering such as special geological environmental exploration programs and to site selection criteria, surface and ground water pollution problems and control, risk assessments related to environmental pollution, environmental impact statements, and water resources management.

The bulk of the body of research published by Souad was performed within her designation as a faculty member in the College of Engineering, University of Baghdad, from 1991 to 2003.

Al-Azzawi led the committee assigned to establish the College of Al-Khawarizmi Engineering College for Advanced Technology, University of Baghdad and was subsequently appointed the first Dean of the college in 2001.

Other roles Al-Azzawi contributed to the scientific community included:

- Associate professor in Environmental Engineering
- Member of the Association of Environmental & Engineering Geologists in the USA
- Board member of the Iraqi Engineering Society
- Member of the Iraqi Water Resource Society
- Member of the Iraqi Academicians Society
- Member of the Iraqi Engineering Union
- Member of editing committee of Al-Handasa Scientific Journal from 1996 to 2002
- Chief editor of the Reconstruction Magazine in the University of Baghdad from 1996 to 2000

== Awards ==
Al-Azzawi is considered a leading and prominent figure in the field of environment engineering in Iraq having received several national and international awards for her many contributions to science.

In 1996, together with six researchers, she was able to do a survey on the radiation in the soil, air and water in southern Iraq. Dr Azzawi met in Baghdad on a regular base with delegates coming from all over the world to present them with her knowledge about the nuclear contamination in Iraq. Her research shows that the people in Iraq suffered from the combined effects of wartime usage of Depleted Uranium combined with sanctions that led to a weak immune system which led to people becoming more quickly affected by radiation, in addition to their inability to receive proper medical treatment results in their death.

Below is a consolidated list of awards Azzawi received:

1. The Geophysics Award from the Colorado School of Mines (USA) in 1988.
2. The Van Tyle Award from the Colorado School of Mines (USA) in 1989.
3. The Scientific Staff Award from the Iraqi Ministry of Higher Education for three consecutive years – 2000, 2001, and 2002.
4. The Iraqi National Award for Distinguished Patents in 2001.
5. The Nuclear-Free Future Award in the Category of Education, Munich, October 2003

In addition to having two patented inventions in advanced Environmental Engineering technology.
