= Guy T. McBride =

American academic administrator (1919–2011)

Guy T. McBride, Jr.
- Born: Guy Thornton McBride; December 12, 1919; Austin, Texas
- Died: March 21, 2011 (aged 91); Lakewood, Colorado
- Education: University of Texas (BS); Massachusetts Institute of Technology (PhD)
- Occupation: chemical engineer
- Years active: 1948 – 1984
- Known for: Creating an innovative curriculum for broadening the education of engineers into other areas.

Guy Thornton McBride (December 12, 1919 – March 21, 2011) was an American chemical engineer who was a professor at Rice University, president of the Colorado School of Mines (CSM) and as an executive of a major American corporation. McBride earned a bachelor's degree in chemical engineering from the University of Texas (UT) in 1940, where he was valedictorian, and the Doctor of Philosophy degree from Massachusetts Institute of Technology (MIT), in 1948.

McBride worked in both industry and academia, although he said that he preferred teaching. He first taught at Rice University from 1948 to 1954. Then he worked as an executive for Texas Gulf Sulphur Company until he was appointed president of Colorado School of Mines in 1970. He retired as president in 1984, but continued to teach chemical engineering courses. He died in 2011.

McBride was a strong believer in the necessity to develop young engineers who could think and work more effectively in society with people who had diverse cultures and backgrounds. He argued that this required more exposure to subjects and experiences than were customarily presented in traditional engineering curricula. The result of his work at CSM was later named, "The Guy T. McBride Honors Program in Public Affairs for Engineers."

== Early life and education ==
Guy McBride was born December 12, 1919, in Austin, Texas. The censuses of 1920, 1930 and 1940 indicate his parents were Guy T. and Imogene (nee Thrasher) McBride, Sr. The family lived in Wharton, Texas through those years. Guy also had a younger brother. After graduating from high school, Guy enrolled in the University of Texas, majoring in chemical engineering. He graduated from UT with the degree of Bachelor of Science in chemical engineering and was valedictorian of his class of 1940. He enrolled in the Massachusetts Institute of Technology at Cambridge, Massachusetts, where he earned master and doctoral degrees in chemical engineering.

== Career ==
After his graduation from MIT in 1948, McBride first went to work as an engineer for Standard Oil Company (now ExxonMobil). A few years later, he became a consultant for Texas Gulf Sulphur Company.

In 1948, he joined the Rice University (then named Rice Institute) in Houston, Texas, as an associate professor of chemical engineering. By 1950 he had also become dean of students, while still teaching. He replaced the late Dean H. H. Cameron, who had died on June 28, 1950. In 1958, he left academia to work for Texas Gulf Sulphur Company. (TGS) as vice president and general manager of its Phosphate Division. (Note: TGS became Texasgulf Corporation in April 1972, and was acquired by Elf Aquitaine in 1981, which sold the company to the Williams Companies in 1984. Potash Corporation of Saskatchewan bought Texas Gulf in 1995.) He left TGS in 1970 to accept an appointment as the president of the Colorado School of Mines (CSM) in Golden, Colorado.

McBride made a major mark during his tenure as CSM president. He is credited with:

- Raising $38 million for the school in four years,
- Adding three new buildings to the campus,
- Doubling enrollment to approximately 1,600 students,
- Establishing an Honors Program for Public Affairs (later named for him).

McBride argued several times before leading state legislators to more funding of education. The Denver Post praised his ability to "...(ramrod) a major expansion despite inadequate state funds." He was also quoted as saying in 1984, "What we're trying to produce is the ability (among students) to think critically and be able to take the problem apart and put it back together. That is deceptively hard." According to the Post, the honors program came about because of his belief that "...engineers should be literate in public policy and social issues as well as engineering." An article describing CSM's innovative approach to engineering education quoted President McBride as saying, We expose our students to stress deliberately to toughen them for the real world. We produce a graduate that really doesn't know there is anything he can't do.

After stepping down from the presidency in 1984, McBride continued living in Golden and teaching courses at CSM. He also served on boards of directors for several corporations, such as Hercules, Halliburton and Kerr-McGee.

== Impact ==
When Guy McBride began his academic career, only a few engineering educators had begun to address how to broaden their students' school experiences. Constraints of budget and time left little room for flexibility in expanding the curriculum beyond courses that were intimately connected to his specialty. McBride's exposure to industry caused him to see that the engineers' jobs were changing at a more rapid pace, forcing him or her to make decisions based on factors that were not even addressed by his college curriculum. As technological progress speeded up, these factors seemed to proliferate, and the engineer's world became more complex.

After McBride came to CSM, he seemed to be the right man in the right place at the right time to begin implementing significant changes in engineering education. As school president, he had the "bully pulpit" to help overcome the bureaucratic inertia that often stymies such changes. Slowly a real program began to take shape. He could talk about actual results at professional meetings and get feedback from corporate executives who were hiring CSM graduates. More schools began tinkering with their own programs.

== Publications ==
- "Humanities for Undergraduate Engineers: A Rich Paradox." John K. Andrews J.; Guy T. McBride Jr.; and E. Dendy Sloan Jr. Journal of Engineering Education. Volume 82, Issue 3, pages 181–184, July 1993.
- "Wealth of good learning" : the story of Colorado School of Mines. Guy T. McBride. New York : Newcomen Society in North America, 1974.
- "Gasification of carbon by carbon dioxide in a fluidized powder bed." E. R. Gilliland, W. K. Lewis and Guy T. McBride, Jr. Industrial & Engineering Chemistry . 41:1213-26. 1949.

== Personal ==
Guy McBride married Rebeckah Bush on September 2, 1942. His wife, Becky, died in 1998. They had three children, two daughters and one son. One daughter, Rebeckah Ann, died in 2004. In 1999, he married Cordelia Rush, who survived him. There were no children from the second marriage.

Guy's father and grandfather had been carpenters, so in his later years, he spent more time on his hobby of woodworking and cabinetry.
