= Colorado lunar sample displays =

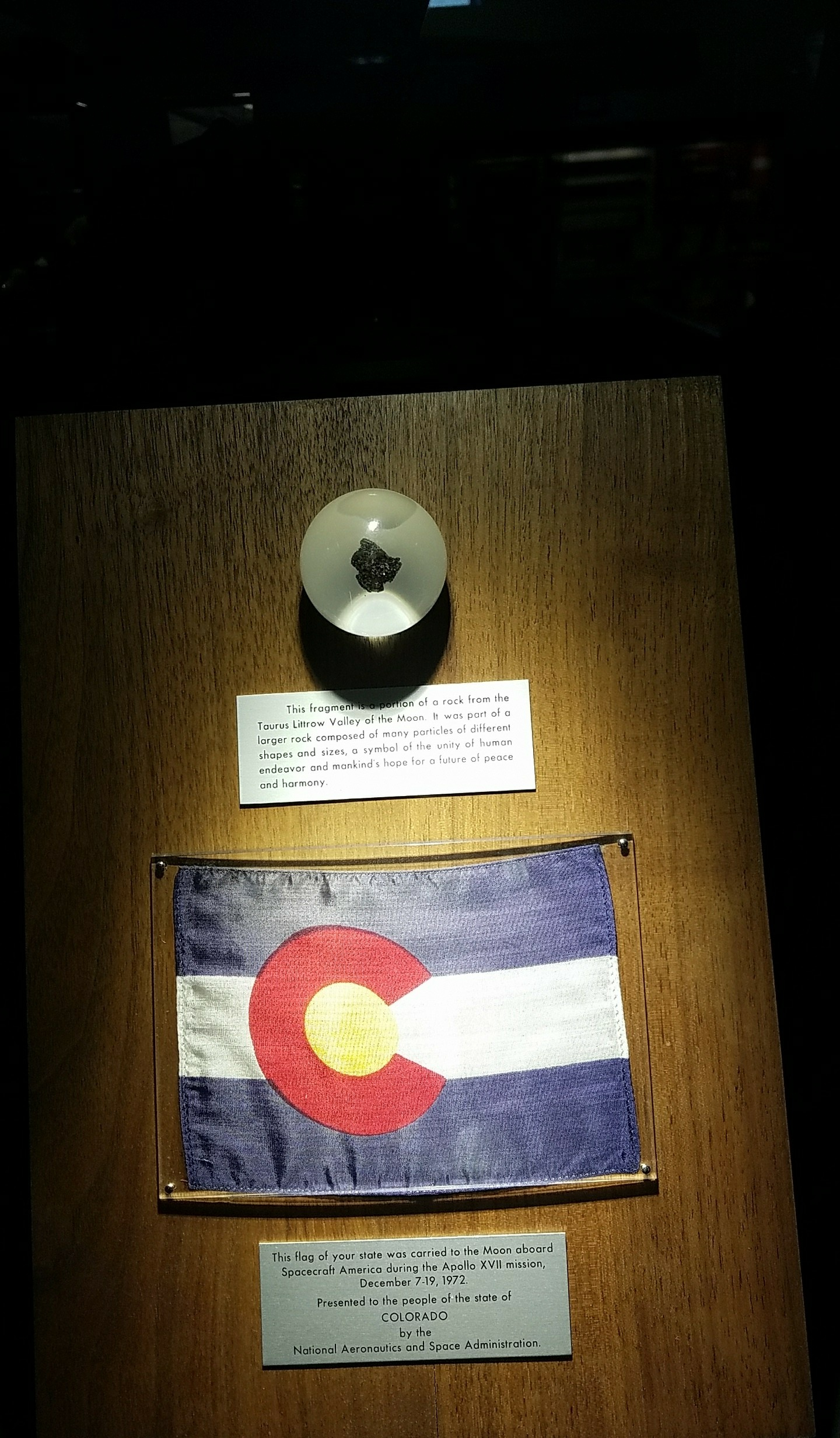
Apollo 17 Display at the Colorado School of Mines

The Colorado lunar sample displays are two commemorative plaques consisting of small fragments of Moon specimen brought back with the Apollo 11 and Apollo 17 lunar missions and given in the 1970s to the people of the state of Colorado by United States President Richard Nixon as goodwill gifts.

== Description ==
=== Apollo 11 ===
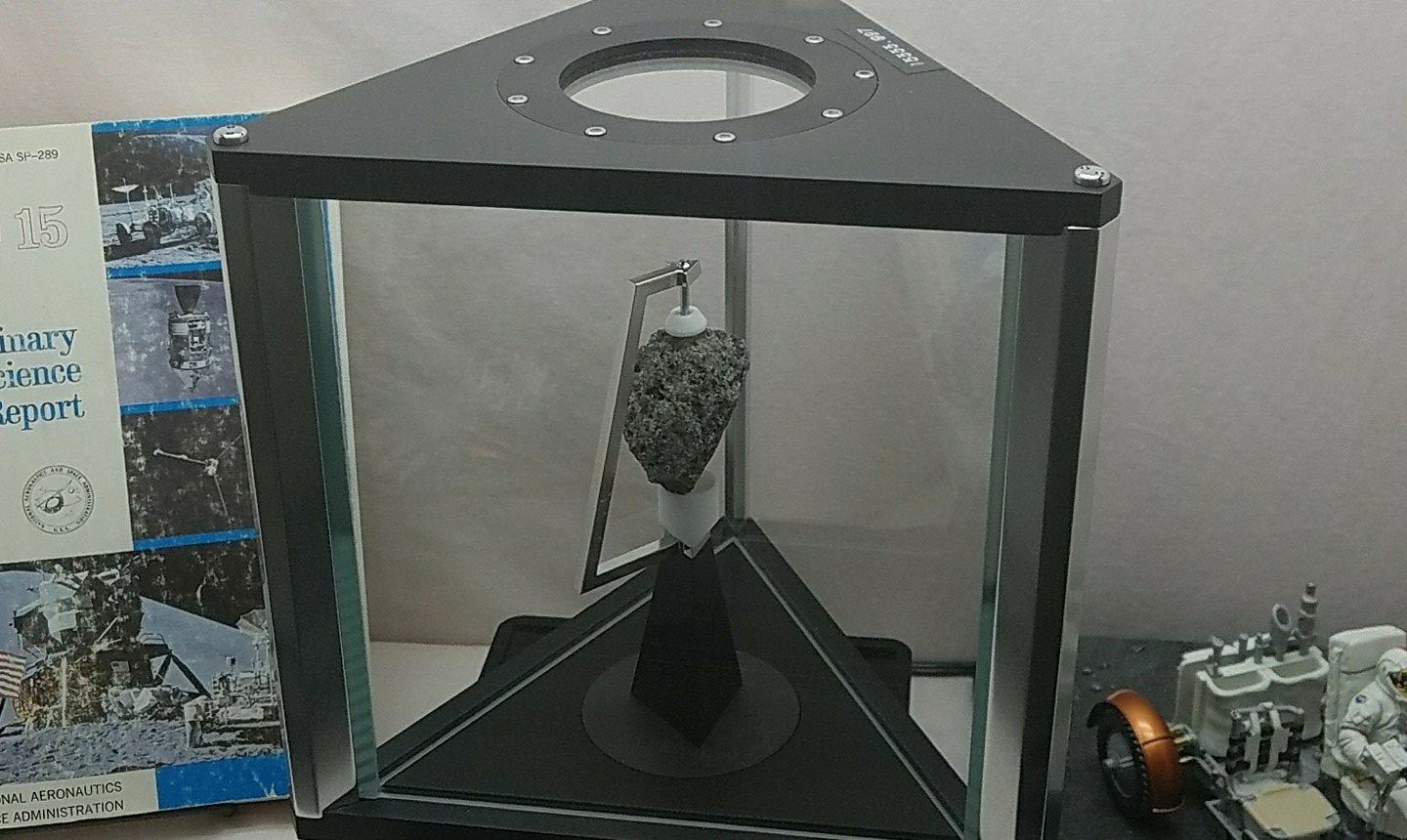
Apollo 11 lunar rock on display at Colorado School of Mines

At the request of Nixon, NASA had about 250 presentation plaques made following Apollo 11 in 1969. Each included about four rice-sized particles of Moon dust from the mission totaling about 50 mg. The Apollo 11 lunar sample display has an acrylic plastic button containing the Moon dust mounted with the recipient's country or state flag that had been to the Moon and back. All 135 countries received the display, as did the 50 states of the United States and the U.S. provinces and the United Nations.

The plaques were given as gifts by Nixon in 1970.

=== Apollo 17 ===
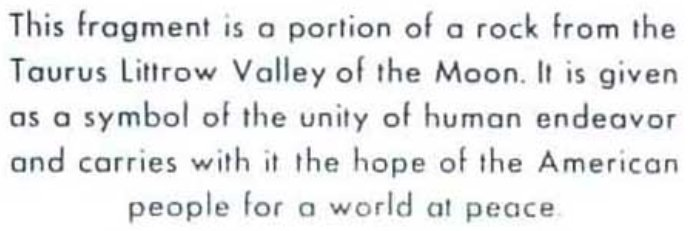
Message on Apollo 17 plaque

The sample Moon rock collected during the Apollo 17 mission was later named lunar basalt 70017, and dubbed the Goodwill rock. Pieces of the rock weighing about 1.14 grams were placed inside a piece of acrylic lucite, and mounted, along with a flag of the country which would receive it, that had flown on Apollo 17.

In 1973 Nixon had the plaques sent to 135 countries, and to the United States with its territories, as a goodwill gesture.

== History ==
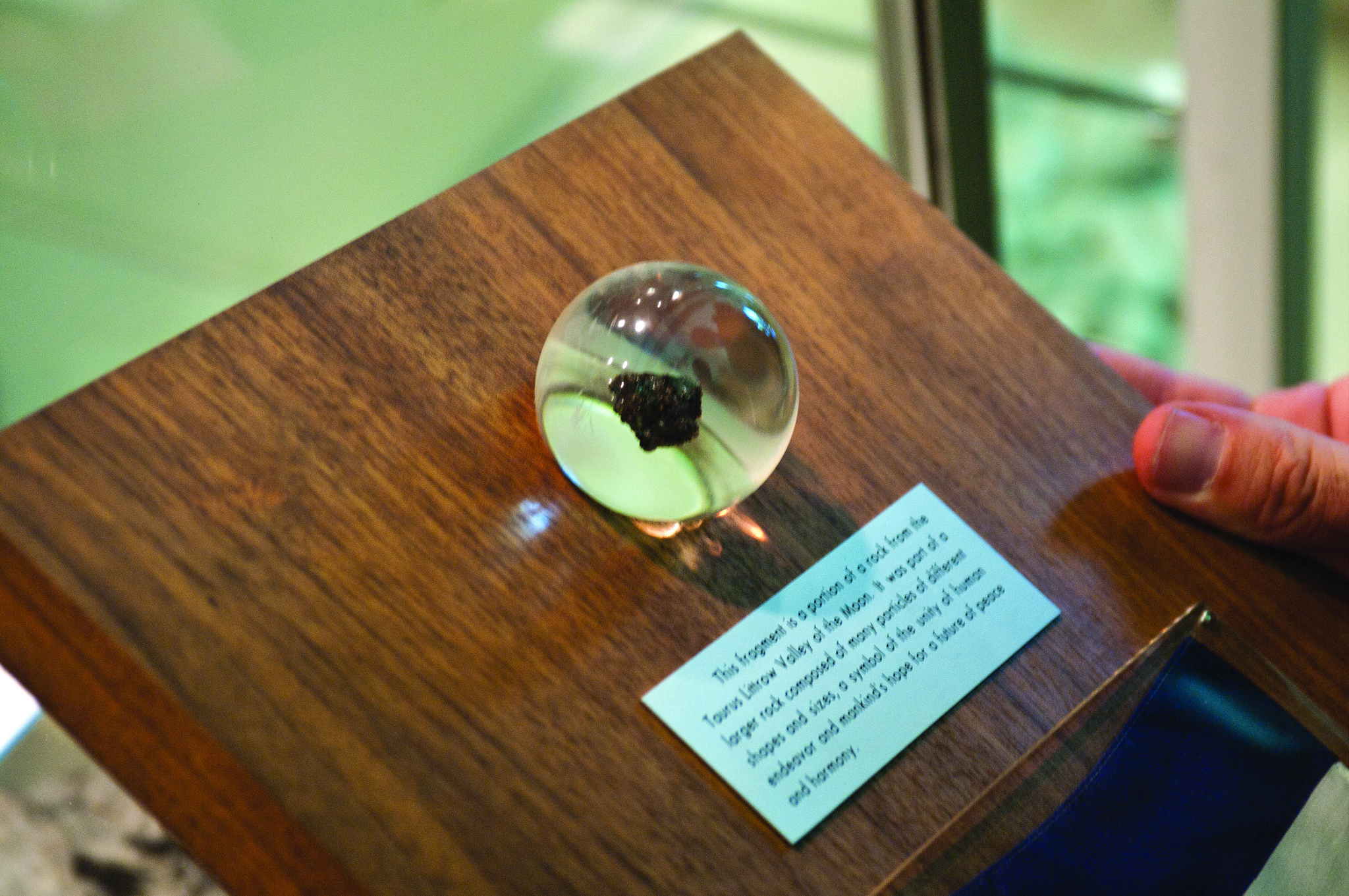
Apollo 17 lunar plaque display

The Colorado Apollo 11 lunar samples plaque was first displayed in a low-security location with easy public access on the first floor of the Colorado State Capitol building beginning around 1992. By 2010 it had been moved to a secure display on the third floor, when the Capitol Building Advisory Committee decided to move it to an unknown location until it could come up with plans for a permanent secure location. This action was prompted by speculative news reports about the high value of the material and concern about the potential for theft.

Some time after NASA astronaut Jack Lousma presented the Colorado Apollo 17 lunar sample display to then-Colorado Governor John Vanderhoof on January 9, 1974, it was considered lost until it was located in June 2010 in Vanderhoof's home. A Denver news channel reported that Vanderhoof, who left office in 1975, "didn't know what to do with the display once he left office so he simply decided to take it with him". The plaque display with the Apollo 17 "Moon rock" has since been moved to the Colorado School of Mines, where it is displayed in the Geology Museum.

== See also ==
- List of Apollo lunar sample displays
