= Jarvis Hall (Colorado) =

Defunct college in Colorado, United States

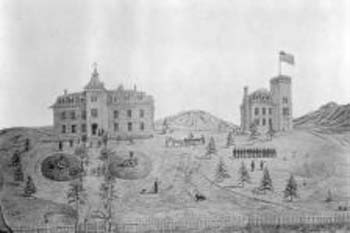
Jarvis Hall (on the left) in 1871.

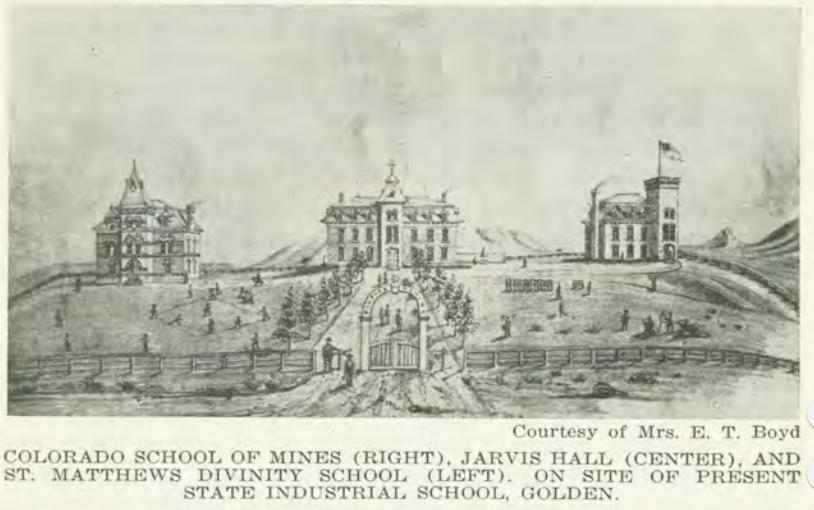
Colorado School of Mines, Jarvis Hall, and St. Mattews Divinity School in Golden, Colorado. The illustration would have had to have been made before 1882 when Jarvis Hall was established in Denver.

Jarvis Hall was a Colorado liberal arts, grammar and military college from 1870–1904. Initiated in 1868 by Bishop George Maxwell Randall of the Protestant Episcopal Church and named after benefactor George A. Jarvis. The 1878-1882 building in Golden, Colorado remains as a private residence, and the 1882-1904 site near Denver is part of the Lowry Campus.

== Golden sites ==
The first Jarvis Hall building under construction in Golden, Colorado, was blown down by an 1869 windstorm, on land donated by C. C. Welch. Jarvis provided funding for construction of a second Jarvis Hall building which was dedicated in October 1870. It was Colorado Territory's first collegiate institute. Two other buildings were added to what was called the Colorado University Schools, which School of Mines and St. Matthew Divinity, an Episcopalian seminary, flanked the central Jarvis Hall. Jarvis donated and solicited donation of books for the Jarvis Hall Library. Annual prizes were awarded at the school year end, funded and chosen by Jarvis. In July 1873, three students won multiple volume sets of the History of Rome, Tyndale's Lectures and Library of Wonders.

Students included Francis William Loveland and architect James H. Gow, who became a master designer that three of his works are recognized by the National Register of Historic Places for their architecture. Jarvis Hall in 1873 began one of the earliest collegiate athletic programs in Colorado with its baseball team, which came to be known as the Jarvis Hall White Legs (after the color of its uniforms). The team utilized students from all three colleges on campus, including pitcher Arthur Lakes (simultaneously a student at Matthews Hall and professor at the School of Mines) and third baseman Peter T. Dotson who in 1874 made the first discovery of a Tyrannosaurus rex fossil in the world. A fire caused by a defective flue burned Jarvis Hall down on April 4, 1878. After an arson attack on sister school Matthews Hall four days later, professor in charge Thomas Lloyd Bellam decided to combine the schools as one. Jarvis Hall was temporarily relocated to the Loveland Block in downtown Golden, and before the end of 1878 Bellam funded a new Jarvis Hall building (now 921 19th Street in Golden). The 19th Street Jarvis Hall was a liberal arts and commercial college open to women.

== Denver ==
Episcopal Church members in Denver succeeded in moving Jarvis Hall near the city in 1882 where it resumed as a boys school. The Jarvis Hall Military School in Montclair, Colorado burned down in 1904, and the site was subsequently used as a military airfield (Lowry Air Force Base in World War II and until the 1990s when it closed and was redeveloped).

== See also ==
- Colorado School of Mines
