= Loveland Block and Coors Building =

- Loveland Building and Coors Building
- U.S. National Register of Historic Places
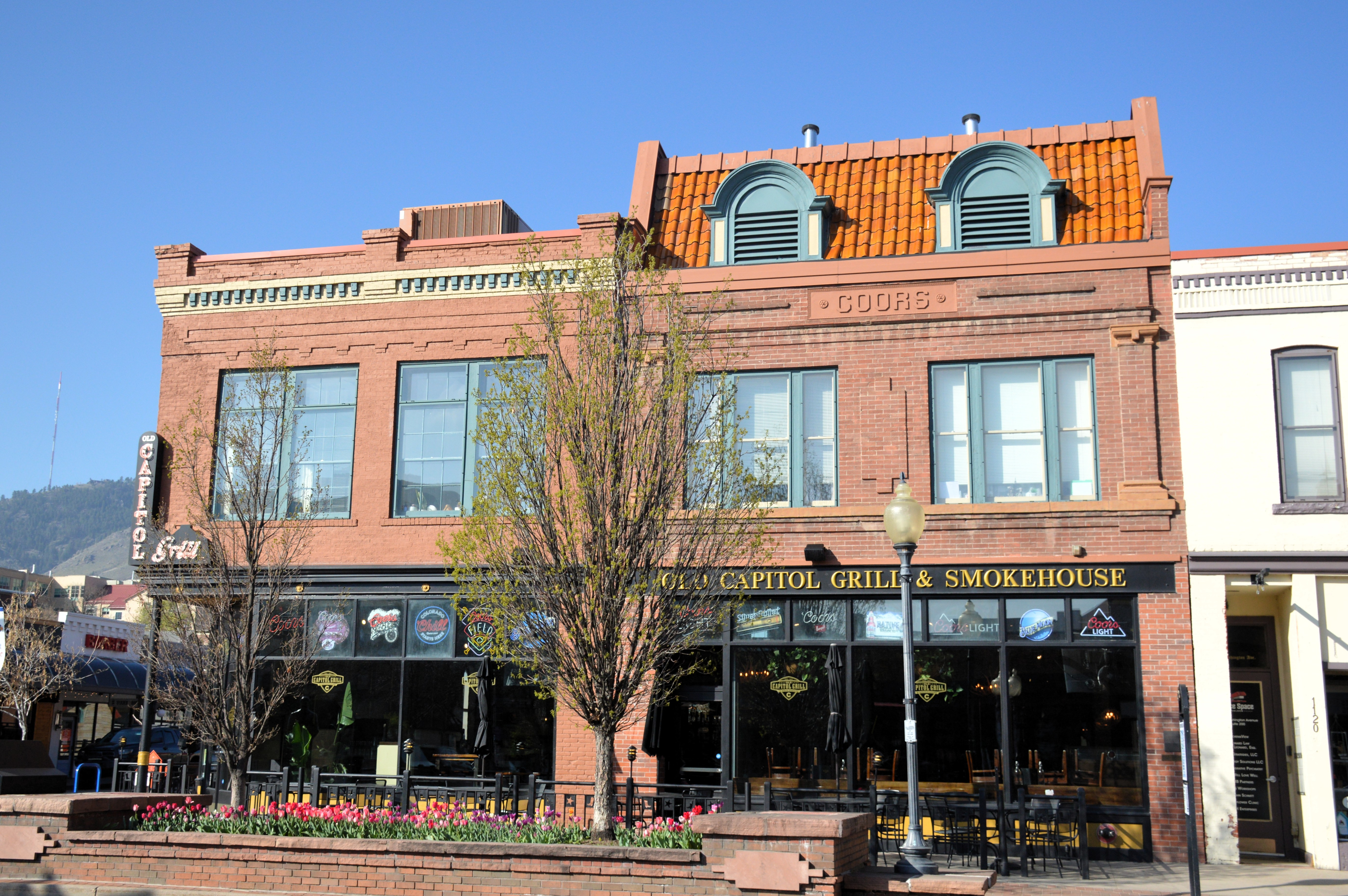
- Loveland Block (on corner), with Coors Building at right

- Location within Colorado Location within the United States
- Location: 1122 and 1120 Washington Ave, Golden, Colorado
- Coordinates: 39.7554°N 105.2216°W
- Built: 1863 & 1906
- Built by: P.O. Unger
- Architectural style: Early Commercial
- NRHP reference No.: 96000544
- Added to NRHP: May 16, 1996

The Loveland Block and the Coors Building are adjacent historic storefront buildings in downtown Golden, Colorado. The Loveland Block, named for pioneer William A.H. Loveland, once served as the territorial capitol building of Colorado. Both buildings are listed on the National Register of Historic Places as a single entity.

The Loveland Building is a two-story brick commercial block. Its front, flat-roofed section was built in 1863, and its rear, gabled roof portion was built in 1865–66.

== History of the Loveland Block ==
The Loveland Block was originally constructed as the forward portion of the present building in 1863, according to the building's cornerstone. It was built jointly by William A.H. Loveland and Golden City Lodge #1, Ancient Free and Accepted Masons, the first Masonic lodge in Colorado. Its building contractor was Duncan E. Harrison. Loveland occupied the first floor as his mercantile and the second floor served as the Masonic temple. The building was a powerful statement in the face of adversity, signaling Golden's endurance in the face of an economic depression caused by the Civil War.

=== Territorial Capitol ===
A warehouse addition spanning the present central section of the first story was built by Loveland during the mid-1860s. In 1866 Loveland extended the first floor the rest of the way to the rear property line and built a full second story addition as well. The purpose was to house the Colorado Territorial legislature under one roof, where the houses previously met in separate buildings across Washington Avenue. The House of Representatives met in the Masonic Hall, which became also known as Representatives Hall. The Council (Territorial identity of the Senate) met at the west end of the upper floor. Four committee rooms spanned the space in between, and the Territorial Library (now Colorado State Library, under charge of Edward L. Berthoud, was housed at the west end of the lower floor. Under Territorial Governor Alexander Cummings, the legislature met in Golden and this building from 1866 through 1867. The Territorial Supreme Court met in the Council Chamber throughout this time as well. Loveland served as a member of the Territorial Council in this building and Berthoud served as Speaker of the Territorial House here.

=== Capital Removal Controversy ===
Ever since the Territorial Capital was moved from Colorado City to Golden in 1862, the rival city of Denver made attempts to secure the capital for itself. Indeed, several legislative sessions that opened in Golden adjourned to Denver. In December 1867 the issue came to a head when the legislature hotly debated the issue. According to the Colorado Transcript newspaper, about $5,000 in case plus town lots were pledged "to influence the removal of the Capital to Denver." After the Council voted by a 1-vote margin to move the capital to Denver, it has been alleged even to the present time that the vote was secured by a bribe. The only known clue offering insight into this claim was published by George West, editor of the Transcript, on February 4, 1874:

"Now that the question of removing the capital has again come up - having passed the lower house by a vote of sixteen for to seven against - Mr. Lawrence, the interpreter of the Council, will have another show for his influence. In 1866, when the capital was removed from Golden, this same Lawrence was a member of the Legislature, and, if report be true, was promised $800 for his vote and influence in favor of removal to Denver. Evans & Co. paid $200 of the money down, and the other $600 was to have been forthcoming when the removal was effected. But Evans & Co., true to their general record, went back on their promise, and our friend Lawrence sought revenge in an affidavit, which he threatened to publish unless Evans & Co. came down according to contract. After some parley a compromise was brought about, Lawrence agreeing to take $400 instead of $600. Should this enterprising linguist be called on in the present instance, he will probably ask for the whole amount in advance, as an affidavit in regard to such a case, following the Las Animas land grab, would not create a ripple of excitement, and even the Denver Tribune would hardly feel called upon to publish it."

Today the Loveland Block is one of only two remaining buildings where the Colorado Territorial assembly is believed to have met, the other being as Colorado's first capital, Colorado City.

=== The Mercantile ===
After the loss of the capital, the Loveland Block found other important uses. It became the headquarters of the Colorado Central Railroad, the first railroad to penetrate the Colorado mountains. In 1878 the upper floor became the emergency home of the Colorado School of Mines and Jarvis Hall after their original campus was attacked by an arsonist. It was here that both colleges admitted their first female students. During the 1890s the upper floor became the hotel of Jasper Babcock. However, the building has been best known as the Mercantile, the store originally started by Loveland across Washington Avenue in 1859. This store was a Golden mainstay, finally closing in 1978 after a remarkable 119 years in operation. 57 of those years it was run by one family, headed by German immigrant patriarch Nicholas Koenig. After the Mercantile faded away the building became a restaurant, progressively the Mercantile, Silverheels, and Old Capitol Grill.

=== Renovations ===
In origin the building was of the Second Empire style of design. Subsequent to its mid-1860s additions, a mansard roof third story was added in 1868. This continued largely unused throughout its existence. In 1905 Koenig hired contractor Perre O. Unger to convert the original arched lower story entrance into a plate glass storefront with ornamental corner support column, and also installed the building's signature 2-ton Diebold safe. In 1922 the upper storefront was remodeled to modernized appearance by contractor Michael Sweeney, at which point the building's cornerstone was removed and given to the Golden Masonic lodge, and it now resides in their possession at the Masonic Temple at 400 10th Street. In 1941 the plate glass storefront was extended partially along the south side of the building and clerestory covered. In 1992 the storefront, with a canopy added in the 1960s, was thoroughly renovated to an approximation of its 1922 appearance. After a nearly catastrophic fire gutted the rear upper floor with water heavily damaging the rest of the building on November 3, 2005, the interior was stripped completely and building thoroughly reinforced, a new rear replacement roof installed, and new more historically accurate upper story windows installed. The distinctive row of chimneys on the 12th Street side, mostly missing since being pared down due to chronic wind damage in 1933, were restored, making the building look more historic after the fire than it did before.

== History of the Coors Building ==
The earliest portion of this building are its outer walls, originally built by William A. Wortham for a prior two-story building on the site, the Dold Building, a grocery, later bakery and saloon, which stood here from 1873 to 1906. In 1906 Adolph Coors reconstructed the Dold Building to build a new saloon and bottling works, as bottling on his brewery grounds was then prohibited by state law. The result was the new Coors Building, a two-story storefront with tile mansard half third floor designed by the Baeressen Brothers of Denver and built by contractor Perre O. Unger. The building's main tenant was the saloon of Charles Sitterle, affiliated with Coors. In 1907 German immigrant Albert Treffeisen moved his north side grocery store here, where it remained as the City Market for many years. Afterward, the building had various tenants and first floor renovations. In 1992 it was renovated to an approximation of its original appearance, and its interior space merged with the Loveland Block to become part of the restaurant. The upper story was water damaged in the 2005 fire and has since been fully renovated. Today, the building still exhibits the "COORS" bannerhead at its cornice.

== See also ==
- National Register of Historic Places listings in Jefferson County, Colorado
