= George A. Jarvis =

American businessman and philanthropist

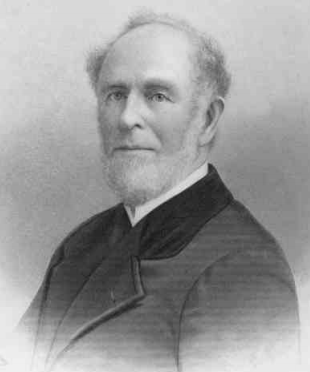
- Born: March 9, 1806; Cheshire, Connecticut
- Died: May 3, 1893 (aged 87); Brooklyn, New York
- Resting place: Greenwood Cemetery
- Occupations: Businessman, philanthropist
- Spouses: Catharine Jarvis; Mary McLean (m. 1836): Maria Jenkins

George Atwater Jarvis (March 9, 1806 – May 3, 1893) was an American businessman and philanthropist. Jarvis was successful in retail and wholesale grocery, banking, and insurance industries in New York. He was founder and vice president of South Brooklyn Savings Institution and president of the Lenox Fire Insurance Company. He sat on the board or was a trustee for many organizations.

As the result of his success, Jarvis was able to be a contributor and founder of a number of educational, historical, religious, and other efforts. His donations helped establish the Episcopalian Jarvis Hall, a college for males in Golden, Colorado; Wolfe Hall in Denver for girls; Bronson Hall at Cheshire Academy; and Trinity College in Hartford, Connecticut. He wrote a book about the genealogical lineage of the Jarvis family. Jarvis was married three times and had one child, Mary Caroline who married Dr. Frederick J. Bancroft in Denver.

== Early years ==
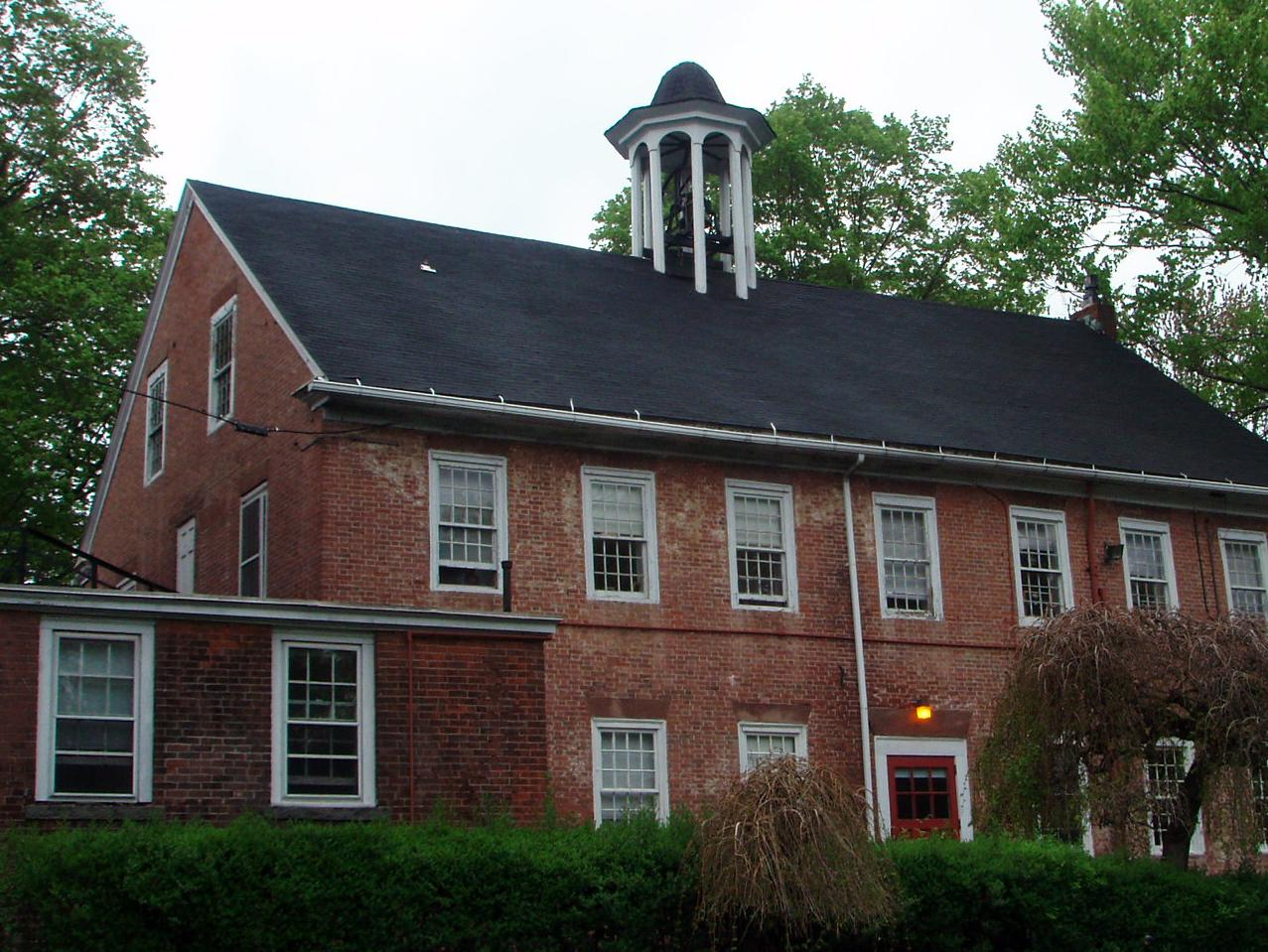
Bowden Hall at Cheshire Academy, the oldest schoolhouse in continuous use in the state of Connecticut

George Atwater Jarvis was born on March 9, 1806, in Cheshire, Connecticut. He was the son of Stephen and Mary Ann Atwater Jarvis, who was the daughter of Benjamin Atwater of Cheshire. His father was treasurer and warden at the St. Peter's church. Both of his parents were devout Episcopalians. His grandfather was Hezekiah Jarvis.

Jarvis had a brother, Benjamin and other siblings. George attended an Episcopalian Cheshire Academy, which was run by Rev. Dr. Tillotson Bronson. At some point during his childhood, Benjamin began to be raised by his uncle, Titus Atwater. Benjamin was a legislator, farmer, and official at St. Peter's Church.

His family had been Episcopalians for several generations. Some were wardens, lay-readers, and bishops. His immediate family lived in the former home of a relative, Bishop Abraham Jarvis. The house was built for the bishop about 1797 when he became a trustee of the newly opened Episcopalian academy in Cheshire.

== Professional and philanthropic career ==
=== Professions ===
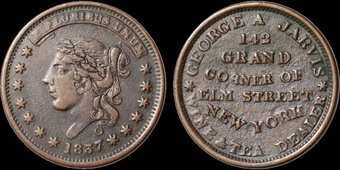
George A. Jarvis hard times tokens from his Wine and Tea store, 1837

At 18 years of age, Jarvis went to New York. His uncle, Noah Jarvis, let him live in his home and made an arrangement with a wool store for George to work as an apprentice with no pay for a year while he learned the business. The second year, he was paid for his work. Within the third year, the economy crashed. Jarvis lost his position at the store and, because of the poor economy, he was unable to find another position. Noah hired his nephew to assist him in the collection of assessments and he performed well. Noah provided a loan so that George could establish a grocery business near Broadway on Grand Street. George repaid the loan, with interest, within several years. George was a wine and tea dealer. He issued copper hard times tokens with his address 142 Grand near Elm, a bust image of Liberty, and the year 1837. He cofounded a wholesale grocery business, Stanton and Jarvis, in September 1838.

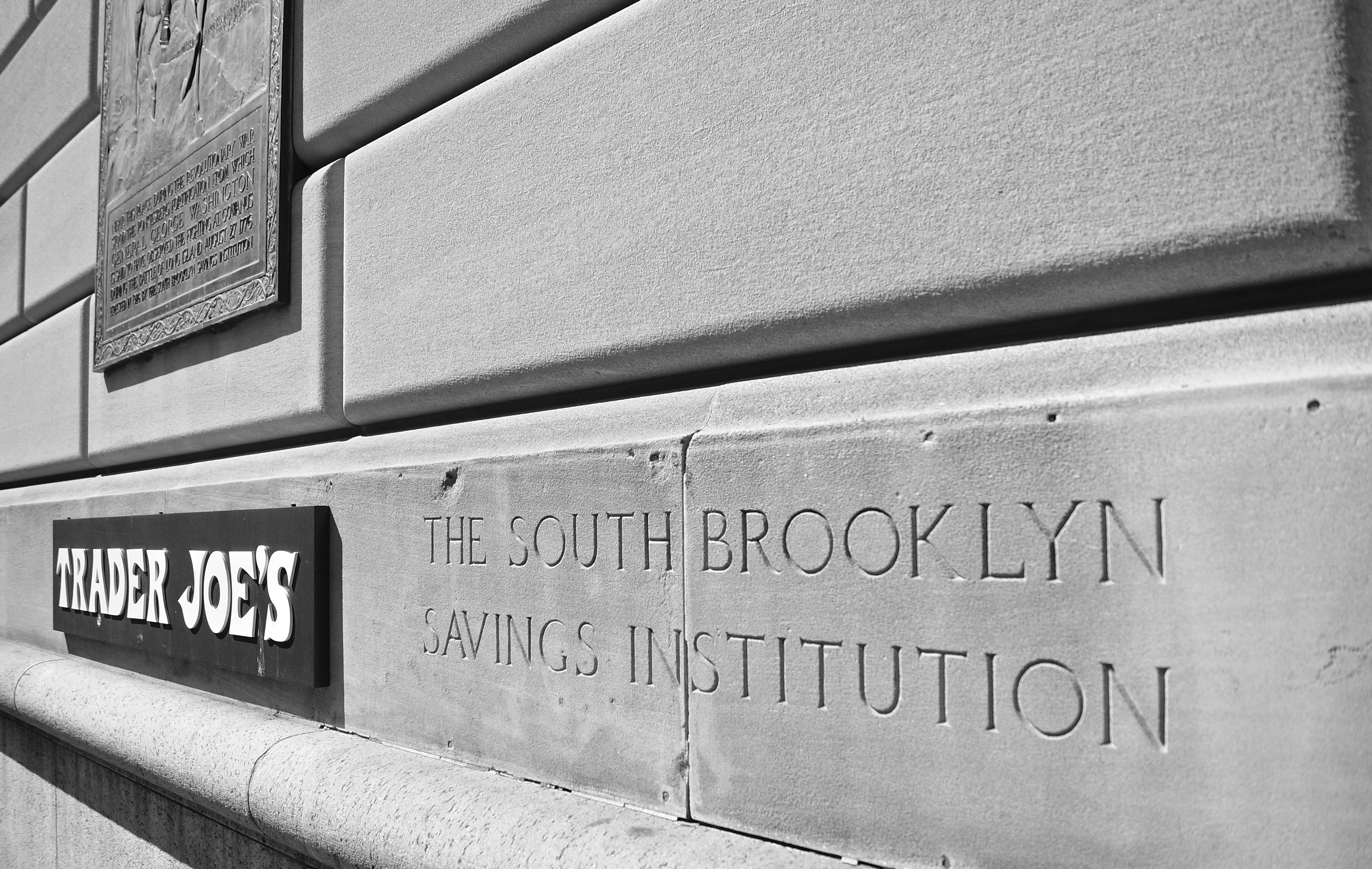
Former South Brooklyn Savings Institution building, now Trader Joe's

After Jarvis moved to Brooklyn in 1841, he developed business and civic interests within the borough. Jarvis withdrew from Stanton and Jarvis in 1854 and the same year resigned as director of Atlantic Dock Company. Jarvis was a trustee or director of the Home Life Insurance Company, Brooklyn Collegiate and Polytechnic Institute and Union Trust Company.

For 33 years, he was vice president of South Brooklyn Savings Institution, which he co-founded. Jarvis was president of the Lenox Fire Insurance Company beginning in 1860, during which time it had acquired a $90,000 surplus after having been "crippled". He retired in 1881.

=== New York and other eastern states ===
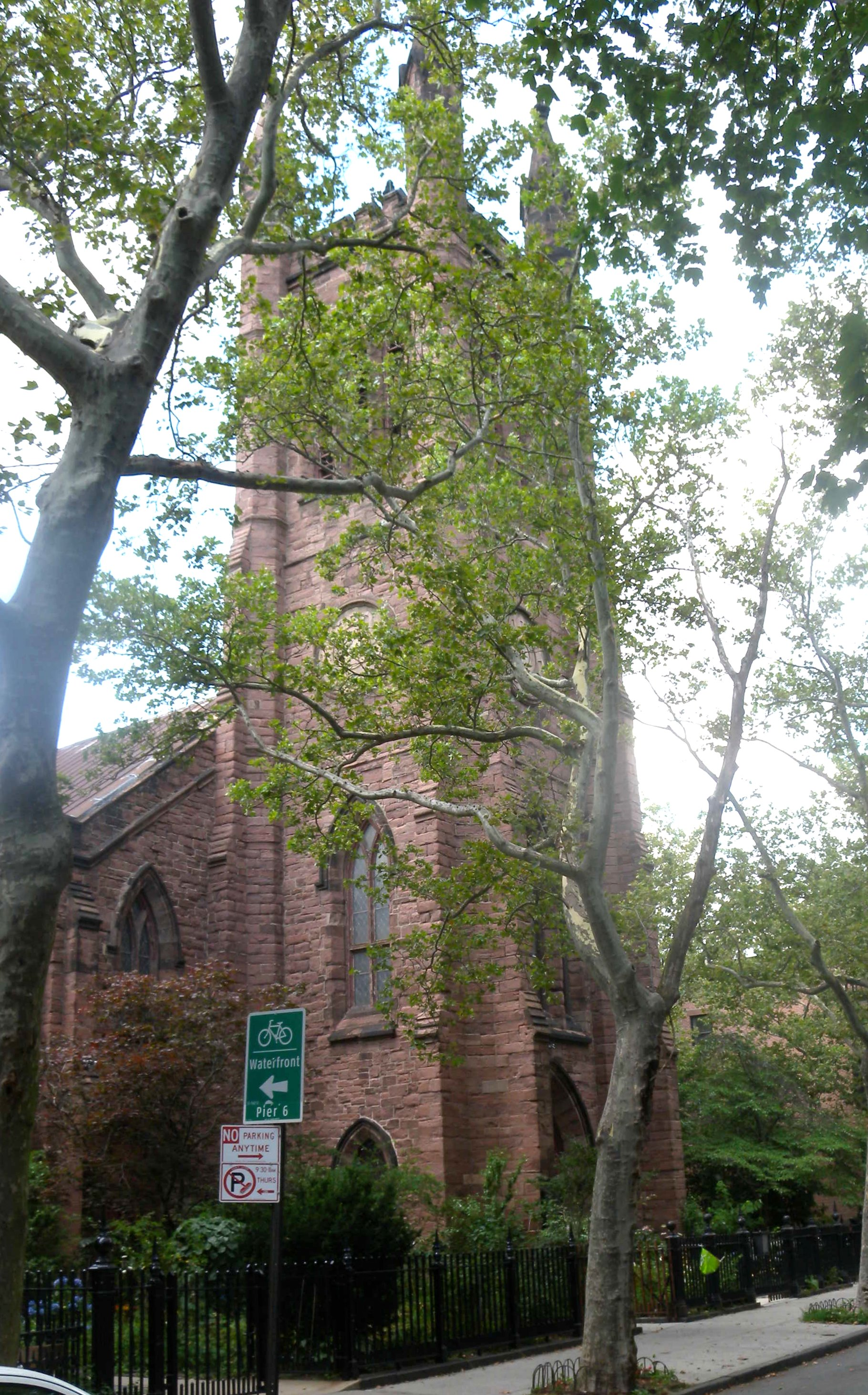
Christ Church in Cobble Hill, Brooklyn

Jarvis made large donations to the Christ Church in Brooklyn and his hometown St. Peter's Church. The Cheshire Academy received funds for the construction of Bronson Hall from Jarvis. He also provided scholarships for the Berkeley Divinity School in Middletown.

Jarvis was one of the founders of the Brooklyn Athenaeum. He was also a director or trustee of the General Theological Seminary of the Protestant Episcopal Church in the United States and The Church Charity Foundation. Jarvis was a member of the Brooklyn Mercantile Library, New York Chamber of Commerce, and the Long Island Historical Society.

=== Colorado ===
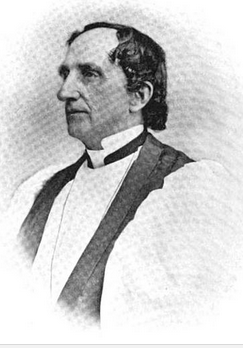
Bishop George M. Randall

During the history of the Colorado Territory, Jarvis worked with his friend Bishop George M. Randall to develop Episcopalian educational facilities in Colorado, where Randall was an Episcopal missionary for the Diocese of Colorado, New Mexico, and Wyoming. The friendship between Randall and Jarvis began when Randall came to New York in 1835 seeking a theological education after graduating from Brown University. After they met, Jarvis donated monies to fund Randall's education. Thus began the first of many efforts by Jarvis to donate funds for people's Episcopal seminary education. He purchased land in Denver for Bishop Randall, his daughter, the Diocese to build a church, other charities, and personal investment.

==== Wolfe Hall ====
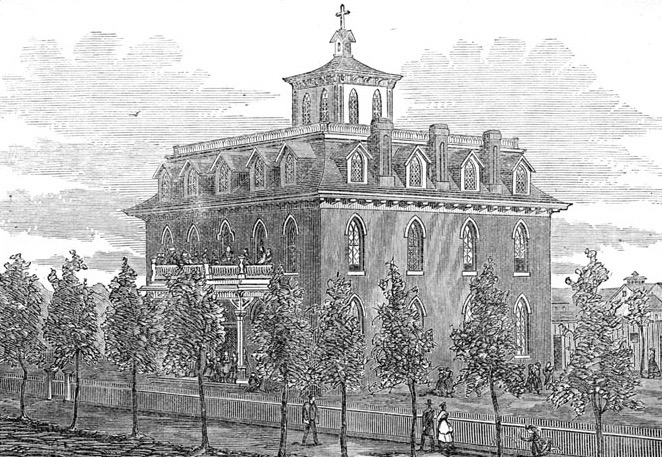
Wolfe Hall, an Episcopalian academy for girls in Denver, Colorado, 1871

Jarvis donated funds for the development of Wolfe Hall, an Episcopal school for girls in Denver. It was located at Champa and 17th Street. Jarvis was the largest contributor to the territorial activities of Bishop Randall. John D. Wolfe of New York was the second largest donor and the namesake for Wolfe Hall, which opened in September 1868. Bishop Randall lived at Wolfe Hall with his wife.

==== Jarvis Hall ====
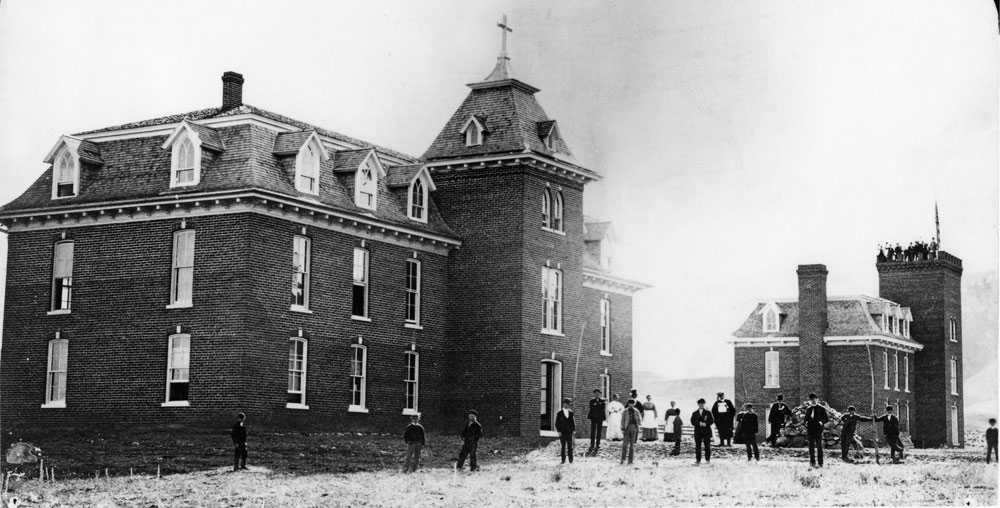
Jarvis Hall (on the left) in Golden, Colorado, before it burned down in 1874

Jarvis created an endowment to found Jarvis Hall, a liberal arts, grammar and military college for males in 1869 that was a predecessor of the Colorado School of Mines. Randall coordinated the creation of the university in Golden, Colorado, which operated from 1870 until 1874, when it was destroyed by a fire. The college operated in another Golden building from 1878 to 1882.

The school moved to Denver in 1882, where it operated until 1904. The site is now part of the Lowry Campus.

== Military service ==
During the time that Davis was managing his business, he had also served in the National Guard of the City of New York from September 1, 1832, to June 4, 1841, when he was honorably discharged.

Horatio Seymour, Governor of New York, appointed Jarvis as a War Committee member in 1862. Rather than serve in the New York Seventh regiment, Jarvis hired someone to serve in his stead. This was a practice that other businessmen and friends utilized. He was a member of the Veteran Corps of Artillery of the State of New York.

== Personal life and death ==
Jarvis was married three times. Catharine Jarvis, his first wife, died within a year of their marriage. She was the daughter of Samuel Jarvis of New York. Jarvis married his second wife, Mary McLean on February 11, 1836. She was the daughter of Cornelius McLean of New York. Maria Jenkins, his third wife, was the daughter of Lewis Jenkins of Canandaigua, New York, and then Buffalo. Maria was the granddaughter of Hon. Moses Atwater, a founder of St. John's Episcopal Church, Canandaigua.

His only surviving child was Mary Caroline that he had with his second wife, Mary McLean Jarvis. Unable to approve of his daughter's suitor, Jarvis broke their relationship and arranged for Mary Caroline to travel to Europe for a "Grand Tour", which did not relieve her broken heart. Mary Caroline contracted tuberculosis after throwing herself "arduously into church work".

Mary Caroline came to Denver with Bishop George M. Randall to cure her case of tuberculosis. For one year she lived with Bishop Randall and his wife before she married Dr. Frederick J. Bancroft in 1871. During an extended trip to celebrate his daughter's wedding, Jarvis bought four lots that the couple could build a house upon at the southwest corner of Stout and 16th Street. Mary Caroline, an Episcopalian, was a contributor to church and Denver community activities.

Jarvis moved to Brooklyn in 1841 and three years later had a house built there. Jarvis wrote the book The Jarvis Family: Or, The Descendants Of The First Settlers Of The Name In Massachusetts And Long Island, And Those Who Have More Recently Settled In Other Parts Of The United States And British America.

On May 3, 1893, Jarvis died at his home in Brooklyn. He was buried in Greenwood Cemetery. Among the charities that Javis left money to in his will, the largest was for construction of Trinity College of Hartford, Connecticut.
