= Colorado School of Mines =

Public university in Golden, Colorado, U.S.

- Former name: Territorial School of Mines (1874–1876)
- Motto: Nil sine numine (Latin)
- Motto in English: "Nothing without God's will."
- Type: Public research university
- Established: February 9, 1874; 152 years ago
- Accreditation: HLC
- Academic affiliations: Space-grant
- Endowment: $463.3 million (2025)
- President: Paul C. Johnson
- Provost: Stefanie Tompkins
- Faculty: 603
- Students: 8,247 (fall 2025)
- Undergraduates: 6,371 (fall 2025)
- Postgraduates: 1,876 (fall 2025)
- Location: Golden, Colorado, United States; 39°45′4″N 105°13′21″W
- Campus: 373 acres (1.51 km^{2}); Large Suburb
- Newspaper: The Oredigger
- Colors: Blue and silver
- Nickname: Orediggers
- Sporting affiliations: NCAA Division II – Rocky Mountain
- Mascots: Marvin the Miner; Blaster the Burro
- Website: mines.edu

The Colorado School of Mines (Mines) is a public research university in Golden, Colorado, United States. Founded in 1874, the school offers both undergraduate and graduate degrees in engineering, science, and mathematics, with a focus on energy and the environment. While Mines does offer undergraduate minor programs in the humanities, arts, and social sciences, it only offers degree programs in STEM fields, with the exception of economics. In the fall 2025 semester, the school enrolled 8,247 students, including 6,371 undergraduate and 1,876 graduate students. It is classified among "R1: Doctoral Universities – Very high research activity".

== History ==
=== 19th century ===
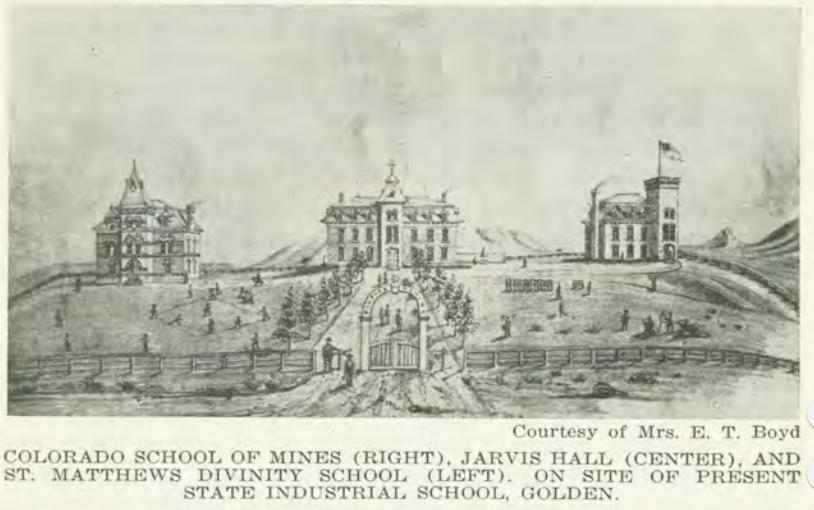
Colorado School of Mines, Jarvis Hall Collegiate School, and Matthews Divinity School in 1882

Golden, Colorado, established in 1859 as Golden City, served as a supply center for miners and settlers in the area. In 1866, Bishop George M. Randall of Massachusetts arrived in the territory and, seeing a need for higher education facilities in the area, began planning for a university which would include a school of mines. In 1870, he opened the Jarvis Hall Collegiate School in the central building of the Colorado University Schools campus just south of the town of Golden, accompanied it with Matthews Hall divinity school in 1872, and in 1873 the School of Mines opened under the auspices of the Episcopal Church. In 1874 the School of Mines, supported by the territorial government since efforts began in 1870, was acquired by the territory and has been a state institution since 1876 when Colorado attained statehood. Tuition was originally free to residents of Colorado.

In 1878, Jarvis Hall's main building and Matthews Hall were both destroyed by fires in the span of two days. The School of Mines building was the only structure of the complex left standing. Following the fires, the School of Mines enrollment grew, consisting of prospectors and mine owners. A school library was established with $250, and a gymnasium was built to support the growing student body. The school's fight song, "The Mining Engineer", the first two verses of which are still sung today, was established on campus by 1885.

Following the 1880s, the School of Mines transitioned to become a 4-year university, removing its assaying certificate program. Around this time, silver and blue began to be seen as the official school colors. In 1894, Engineering Hall was completed. As the oldest building on campus, Engineering Hall originally housed the physics and drafting departments, but now houses the Division of Economics and Business. The following year, the CSM Alumni Association was founded with members wearing the first instance of the school's Reuleaux triangle symbol. In 1898, Florence Caldwell became the first female graduate of the School of Mines, earning a Civil Engineering Degree.

=== 20th century ===
At the turn of the century, the School of Mines officially changed its name to the Colorado School of Mines. This marked the start of a long period of investment into Mines. In 1905, Simon Guggenheim donated $80,000 for the construction of Guggenheim Hall, which serves as the school's administration building. On nearby Mount Zion, student Herbert Everest designed a large M made out of rocks for his senior thesis, which was constructed by 20 faculty and 250 students. Also on Mt. Zion, the first experimental mine owned by the Colorado School of Mines was opened. Known as the School Tunnel, it served to train mining engineers until 1921, when the Edgar Mine was purchased and the original School Tunnel was abandoned.

In 1919, tensions between the Colorado School of Mines and the University of Denver resulted in Colorado Governor Oliver Shoup threatening intervention after students from Mines held DU students and local news reporter Bill Bliss hostage in Golden.

During World War II, Mines was one of 227 universities that participated in the Army Specialized Training Program by the War Department. The program focused on training students in practical engineering skills for military service.

=== 21st century ===
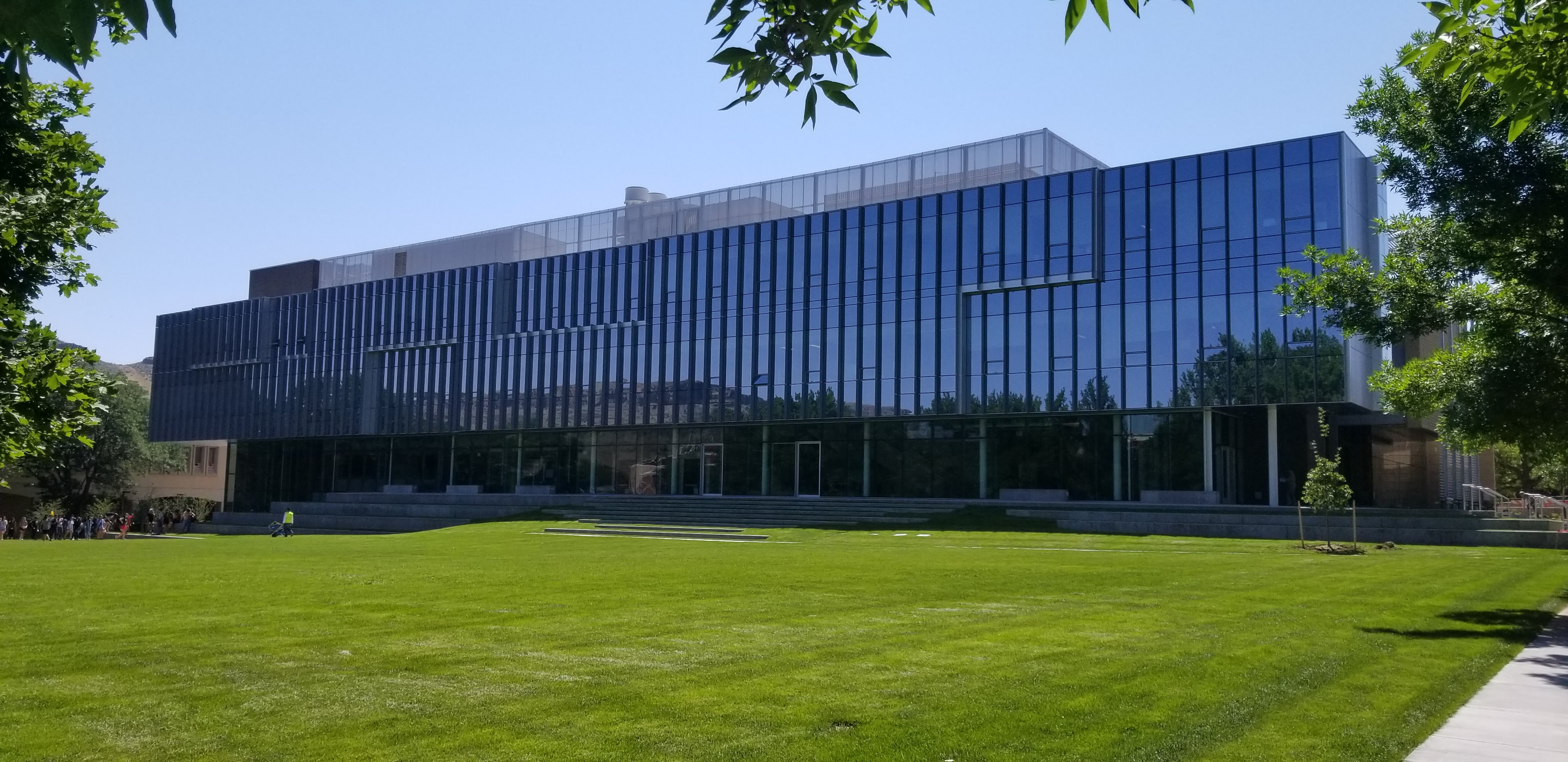
The CoorsTek Center for Applied Science and Engineering, opened to students in September 2017. It is the home building for the Physics Department, and the College of Applied Science and Engineering Dean's Office.

In August 2007, a new student recreation center was completed. In 2008, the school finished expanding its main computer center, the Center for Technology and Learning Media (CTLM). In May 2008 the school completed construction and installation of a new supercomputer nicknamed "Ra" in the CTLM managed by the Golden Energy Computing Organization (GECO), a partnership among the Colorado School of Mines, the National Renewable Energy Laboratory, the National Center for Atmospheric Research and the National Science Foundation. In 2014, CoorsTek granted a $27 million investment to the university, leading to the 2017 opening of the CoorsTek Center for Applied Science and Engineering, a multi-disciplinary building on campus dedicated to both academic and research activities.

Since 1964, the Colorado School of Mines has hosted the annual oil shale symposium, one of the most important international oil shale conferences. Although the series of symposia stopped after 1992, the tradition was restored in 2006.

=== Presidents ===
The following persons have served as president of Colorado School of Mines:

No.	President	Term start	Term end	Ref.
Professors in Charge of Territorial School of Mines (1874–1876)
1	Edward J. Mallett	1873	1875	
2	Gregory Board	1875	1878	
Professors in Charge of Colorado School of Mines (1876–1883)
3	Milton Moss	1878	1880	
4	Albert C. Hale	1880	1883	
Presidents of Colorado School of Mines (1883–present)
1	Regis Chauvenet	1883	1902	
2	Charles S. Palmer	1902	1903	
3	Victor C. Alderson (Note: Alderson served from 1903 to 1913 and from 1917 to 1925.)	1903	1913	
4	William G. Haldane	1913	1915	
5	William B. Phillips	1915	1916	
6	Howard C. Parmelee	1916	1917	
7	Victor C. Alderson	1917	1925	
8	Melville F. Coolbaugh	1925	1946	
9	Ben H. Parker	1946	1950	
10	John W Vanderwilt	1950	1963	
11	Orlo E. Childs	1963	1970	
12	Guy T. McBride, Jr.	1970	July 31, 1984	
13	George S. Ansell	August 1, 1984	July 31, 1998	
14	Theodore A. Bickart	August 3, 1998	July 31, 2000	
interim	John U. Trefny	August 1, 2000	July 31, 2001	
15	John U. Trefny	August 1, 2001	June 18, 2006	
16	Myles W. Scoggins	June 19, 2006	June 30, 2015	
17	Paul C. Johnson	July 1, 2015	present	

Table notes:

== Campus ==
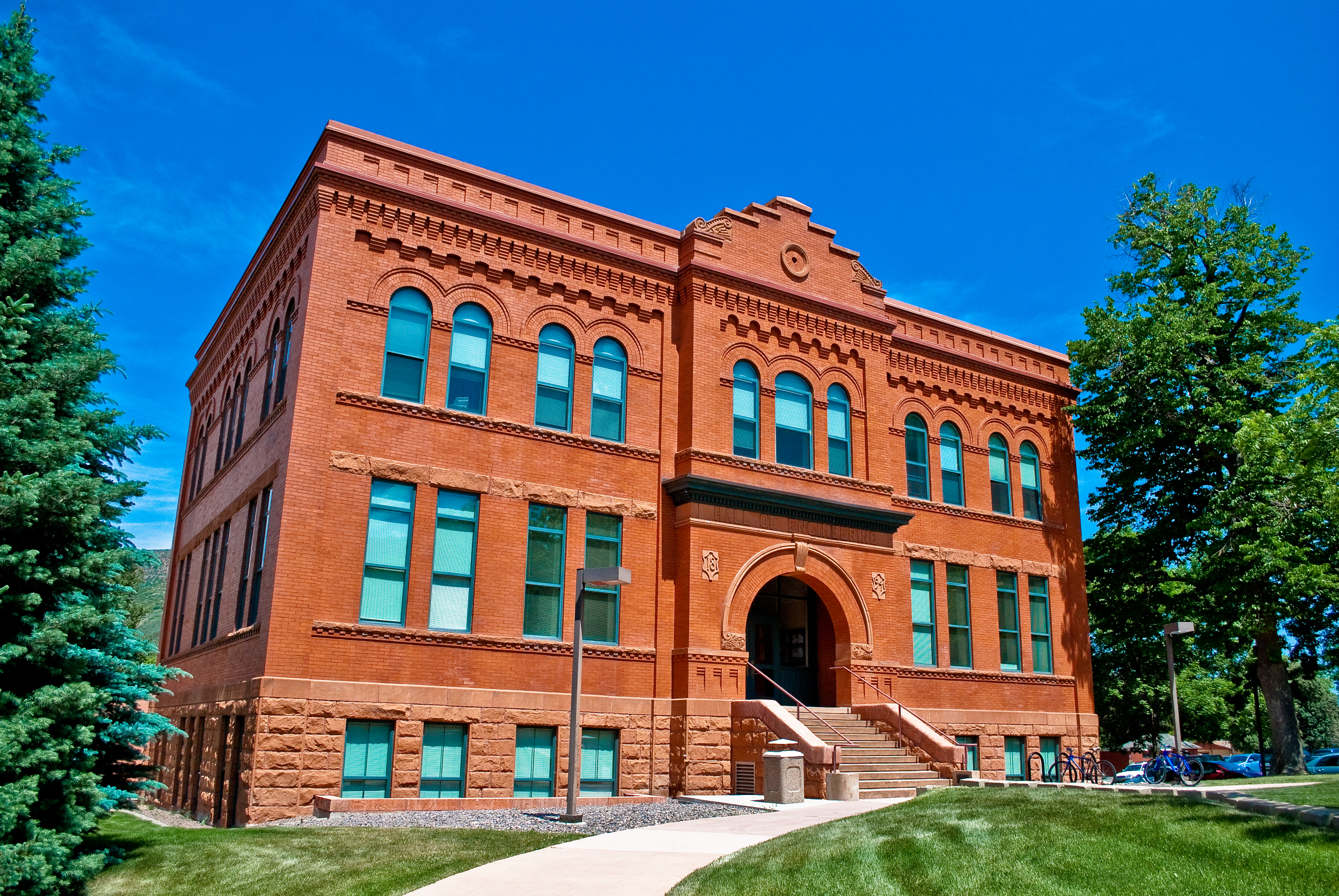
Engineering Hall, constructed in 1894

Colorado School of Mines is located to the southwest of Golden's downtown, bordered by U.S. Route 6 and Clear Creek. The campus spans 373 acres (1.51 km^{2}), and includes over a dozen academic and research buildings, indoor and outdoor athletic facilities, two student centers, a library, eight residential halls, and administration buildings. Additionally, the campus hosts a research building for the United States Geological Survey, housing the National Earthquake Information Center.

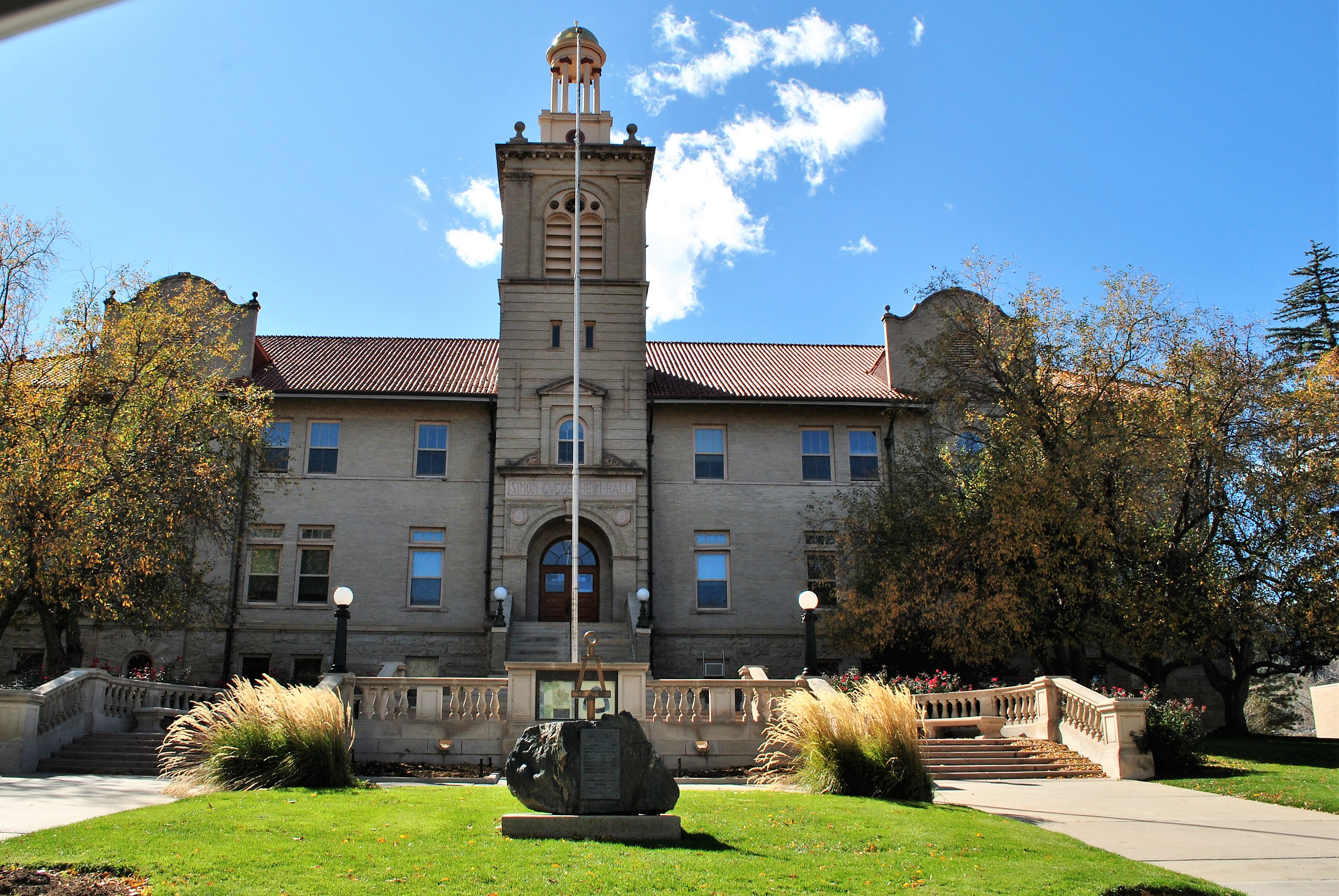
Guggenheim Hall

Colorado School of Mines also operates the free admission Mines Museum of Earth Science, which displays rock and mineral specimens collected from Colorado's numerous mining districts, as well as around the world. Notable objects in the collection include one of the "Goodwill" Apollo 17 lunar samples and the Miss Colorado crown.

=== Labriola Innovation District ===
The Labriola Innovation District, composed of McNeil Hall, Aramco xWorks, and the Labriola Innovation Hub (InnoHub), was opened in early 2024. Named after Frank and Mary Labriola, the InnoHub's 37,000 square feet and supporting buildings host the capstone design program, student design competition teams, and students' entrepreneurial and personal endeavors. The InnoHub also consists of a machine shop, woodworking shop, composite workshop, electronics lab, tool rental center, additive manufacturing lab, and open-build space for student use.

McNeil Hall contains classrooms dedicated to cornerstone and capstone design classes, as well as a large parking structure. The Mines Police Department, Lock Smith, Environmental Health and Safety, and Parking Services are also based on the first floor.

=== Beck Venture Center ===
The Beck Venture Center provides business mentorship and support for students and faculty to build businesses. Multiple venture capitalists, angel investors, and engineering consultants maintain offices in the Venture Center to support the campus business ecosystem. Mines, through the Beck Venture Center, is one of ten members of the western division of the National Science Foundation's Innovation Corps Program, which provides students and faculty with grants to pursue their inventions.

=== Edgar Experimental Mine ===
The Edgar Experimental Mine is the primary educational mine owned by Mines in Idaho Springs. The mine was originally a silver and gold mine founded in 1870 by the Big Five Mining Company. It was acquired by Mines in 1921 after Big Five declared bankruptcy. Edgar Mine is primarily used to train mining engineers, although it is also used by various state and federal agencies to develop a wide range of products and techniques, including the U.S. Army's tunnel detection program, which built one of the mine's two portals.

The mine features a fully operational mine railway, internet system, and classroom. In addition to being used by mining engineers, it is also used by electrical, biological, and civil engineering students for various projects.Edgar Mine Classroom | Rock Powered Life | University of Colorado Boulder The property also contains an outdoor explosives lab used by researchers and educational creators, like the Slow-Mo-Guys.

In 2023, the FreePort-McMoRan Foundation gave $1 million to modernize Edgar Mine.

=== United States Geological Survey ===
The USGS maintains multiple buildings and centers co-located on the Mines campus. The Federal Geologic Hazards Science Center, which includes the National Earthquake Information Center, Landslide Hazards Program, and Geomagnetism Program all are based on the main Mines campus.

In 2023, federal, state, local, and university representatives broke ground on a new 190,000 sqft USGS Energy and Mineral Research Facility on the Mines campus. This building will house the USGS Geology, Geophysics, and Geochemistry Science Center as well as the Central Energy Resources Science Center.

=== Mines Museum of Earth and Science ===
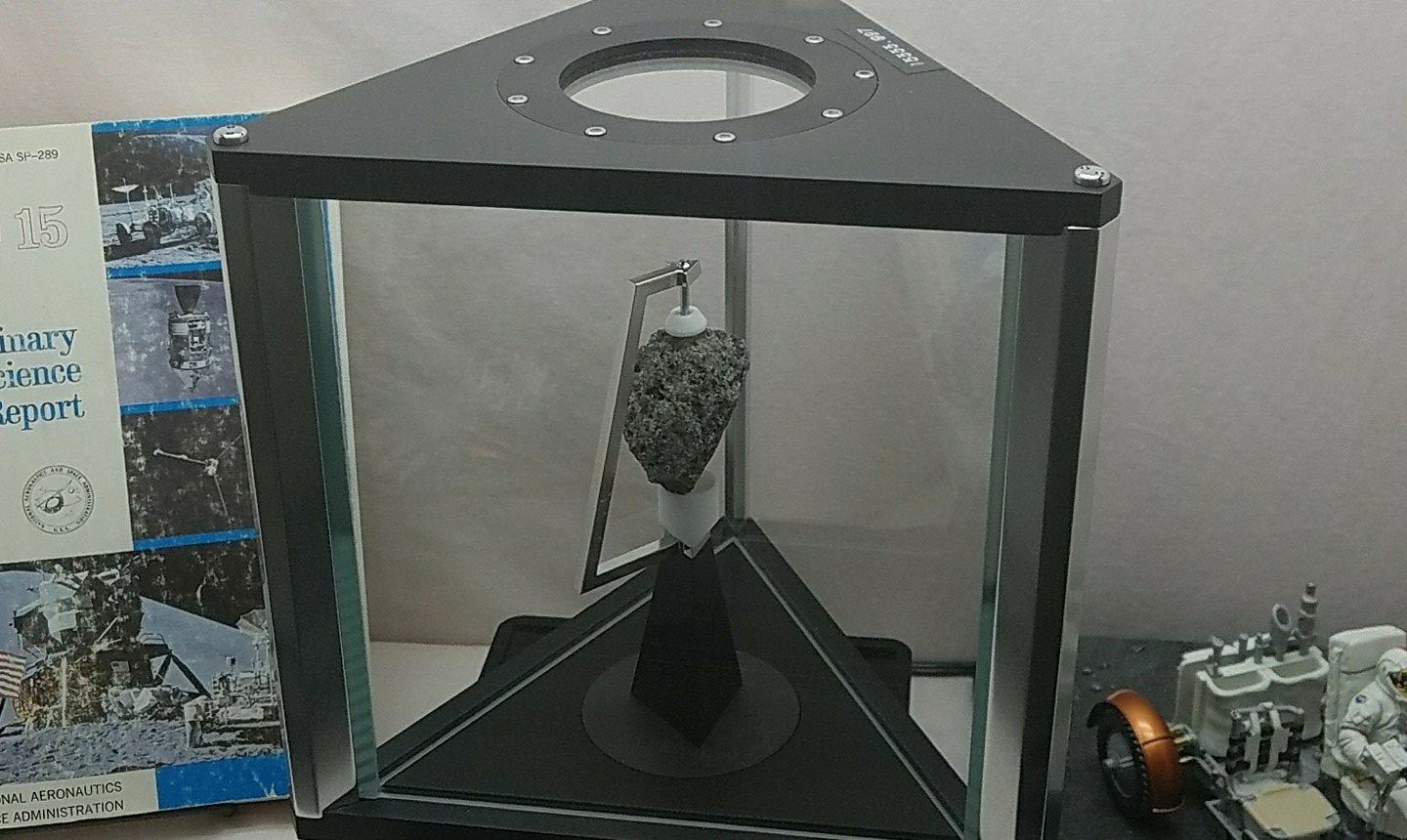
Moon rock on display at Colorado School of Mines

The Mines Museum of Earth and Science is a free museum located on the Mines campus with a collection of over 40,000 rocks, minerals, fossils, gems, and other earth-science related objects.

The museum's collection includes the Miss Colorado crown, which has multiple hand-carved amethyst state flowers, diamond, topaz, emerald, and ruby gemstones. It also includes two moon rocks: One of the State of Colorado's goodwill moon rocks, collected on the Apollo 17 mission, and one collected during the Apollo 11 mission.

=== Clear Creek Athletics Complex ===
Clear Creek Athletics Complex hosts facilities for Mines' varsity sports teams north of campus. Facilities include the Joe Coors Jr. Softball Field, Jim Darden [Baseball] Field, Stermole Track & Field Complex, Stermole Soccer Stadium, and Alumni Field at Marv Kay Stadium.

Marv Kay Stadium was built in 2015 on the site of the historical Campbell Field. Since 2015, additions have raised the capacity of the stadium, adding a permanent beer garden, standing room, and kids' zone in the west endzone. Marv Kay stadium also contains practice facilities for teams at the Clear Creek Athletic Complex, including a varsity weight room, sports medicine offices, hydrotherapy center, equipment rooms, event center, and an auditorium.

== Academics ==
The Colorado School of Mines offers bachelor of science, master of science, professional master, and doctoral degrees, as well as postgraduate professional certifications. The University is accredited by the Higher Learning Commission and the Accreditation Board for Engineering and Technology. All of Mines' programs are in STEM fields. Mines offers 20 undergraduate degree programs, 100 graduate degree programs, and 30 postgraduate certificate programs.

Mines founded the world's first geophysics department in 1926 in response to the oil and mining industry's need for dedicated geophysical engineers. Additionally, Mines founded the world's first graduate program in space resources in the 2018 fall semester, offering both master's and PhD degrees.

=== Academic Departments ===
Academic programs at Mines are administered by 17 departments:

- Department of Applied Mathematics and Statistics
- Department of Chemical and Biological Engineering
- Department of Civil and Environmental Engineering
- Department of Chemistry
- Department of Computer Science
- Department of Economics and Business
- Department of Engineering, Design and Society
- Department of Electrical Engineering
- Department of Geology and Geological Engineering
- Department of Geophysics
- Department of Humanities, Arts, and Social Sciences
- Department of Mechanical Engineering
- Department of Metallurgical and Materials Engineering
- Department of Mining Engineering
- Department of Petroleum Engineering
- Department of Physics
- Department of Military Science

=== Interdisciplinary Graduate Programs ===
There are an additional 18 graduate programs which draw on faculty from two or more departments:

*Additive Manufacturing
- Advanced Energy Systems
- Carbon Capture, Utilization, and Storage
- Data Science
- FEA Professional
- Geochemistry
- GIS and GeoInformatics
- Humanitarian Engineering and Science
- Hydrologic Science and Engineering
- Materials Science
- Nuclear Engineering
- Operations Research with Engineering
- Quantitative Biosciences and Engineering
- Quantum Engineering
- Robotics
- Space Resources
- STEM Teaching
- Underground Construction and Tunnel Engineering

=== University Honors and Scholars Programs ===
==== Thorson First-Year Honors ====
The Thorson First-Year Honors program replaces two freshman-level classes with Thorson-specific classes that emphasize the intersections of STEM and the humanities. Students apply to the Thorson Honors program before beginning their freshman year at Mines. Each cohort of Thorson Scholars is split into seminar sessions led by interdisciplinary faculty teams that dive into critical thinking, design, communication, and ethical problem solving. Thorson Honors students who are also approved for the Mines Study Abroad Program are given the opportunity to study in Antibes, France for their first semester.

==== Grandey First-Year Honors ====
The Grandey First-Year Honors program uses a leadership lens and a maker mindset to educate its scholars in principles of problem solving, team communication, and project management. Similar to the Thorson First-Year Honors Program, the Grandey Honors Program replaces two freshmen-level classes with small seminar classes led by a rotating team of expert faculty.

==== McBride Honors ====
The McBride Honors Program in Public Affairs integrates the liberal arts with science and engineering. Accepting about 40 students per year, the McBride Honors Program places a high emphasis on internships, particularly in public policy, industry, and the non-profit sector.

To graduate with McBride Honors, scholars must complete a series of specialty classes as well as a self-designed practicum. Past practica have included studying abroad, landscape painting, and making documentaries. Practicum funding is typically provided by the scholar and program aid, depending on the scholar's needs.

==== Harvey Scholars ====
The Harvey Scholars program attracts students with a passion for service. Programming includes luncheons with donors Hugh and Michelle Harvey, community-wide service activities, off-campus retreats, and small group dinners.

A Harvey Scholarship covers full tuition and mandatory fees for eight semesters at Mines. It also includes travel and enrichment grants to support study abroad programs, research pursuits, and professional development.

==== Vanguard and Caldwell Scholars ====
The Vanguard and Caldwell Communities of Scholars are for female students who embody leadership skills and a desire to improve the world through science, technology, engineering and mathematics. These service leadership programs train leaders through professional development, community service and academic success over four years.

As members of the Vanguard and Caldwell communities, scholars benefit from vertically integrated support within the cohort, access to women faculty and campus leadership, in addition to financial assistance. The Caldwell students receive a full tuition scholarship and are identified as students who demonstrate a commitment to the legacy and ideals of Florence Caldwell. Vanguard scholars receive a partial scholarship and are identified as students who will lead the way in making advances in STEM for society upon graduation.

==== Mines Undergraduate Research Fellowship (MURF) ====
The Mines Undergraduate Research Fellowship Program provides funding for full-time undergraduate students to collaborate with campus researchers. This provides students with an opportunity to participate in research projects under the mentorship of Mines faculty in every field represented at Mines. Some past research MURF students have contributed to includes research on Particle Physics, Explosives Engineering, and Oceanography.

=== Field Session ===
Every undergraduate must complete one or more field sessions. Field session is designed to expose students to practical skills in their discipline and provide experience graduates can lean on in their careers. Typically, field sessions are offered in the summer, although some departments offer field sessions during the academic year.

Field session topics depend on the students interests and major. Earth science students go on trips to survey and conduct research, while engineering students may complete a co-op, build semiconductors, or operate a chemical plant.

=== Rankings ===
University rankings

Global – Overall
- QS World: 571 (2026)

USNWR departmental rankings
Chemistry	96
Computer Science	91
Earth Sciences	28
Engineering	59
Mathematics	117

- Tied for 36th in U.S. News & World Report's 2024 "Top Public Schools" in the U.S.
- 52nd in U.S. News & World Report's 2024 "Best Engineering Graduate Schools" in the U.S., with the Petroleum Engineering program ranked third.
- 1st by QS for worldwide Mineral and Mining Engineering.
- Tied for 76th in U.S. News & World Report's 2024 "Best National Universities Rankings".
- 83rd out of 174 schools ranked in Kiplinger's Personal Finance magazine's 2019 "Best Values in Public Colleges."
- 27th in Niche's "Best Colleges for Engineering in America"
- Colorado School of Mines is ranked 7th nationally for Return on Investment for Students by PayScale's 2024 rankings
- 1st for NCAA Division II athletes.

== Undergraduate admissions ==
Undergraduate demographics as of Fall 2023
Race and ethnicity	Total
White	68%
Hispanic	13%
Asian	7%
Two or more races	6%
International student	2%
Unknown	2%
American Indian/Alaska Native	1%
Black	1%
Economic diversity
Low-income (Note: The percentage of students who received an income-based federal Pell grant intended for low-income students.)	13%
Affluent (Note: The percentage of students who are a part of the American middle class at the bare minimum.)	87%

For freshmen entering Fall 2021, Colorado School of Mines received 12,022 applications, accepted 6,838 (56.9%) and enrolled 1,449 (12.1% of those who applied). The middle 50% range of SAT scores for the enrolled freshmen was 650–720 for evidence-based reading, and 660–750 for math, while the ACT Composite range was 29–33. The average GPA was 3.84. Of the incoming class, 32.7% were women.

== Traditions ==
=== M Climb ===
Freshmen students at Colorado School of Mines are expected (but not required) to participate in the M Climb during orientation week. During this climb, students carry a ten-pound rock up Mt. Zion. Before ascending up the mountain, students are given colored hard-hats, which are spray-painted by members of the Blue Key Honor Society. Along the climb, other students encourage the new students with water balloons, silly string, and lead the new students in learning the Mines' fight song. At the top of the mountain, students place their rock on the "M," a large sign made of rocks in the shape of Mines' M logo, and paint the M white using whitewash. On graduation, seniors are invited to take a rock from the M as a keepsake of their time at Mines.

=== E-Days ===
Beginning in 1934, Mines students have celebrated Engineering Days during the spring semester. During E-Days, classes are canceled and students attend a variety of events beginning with the ore cart pull. Students take turns pulling an ore cart down 7.5 miles of Colfax Avenue to the state capitol building, where the governor of Colorado officially declares the start of E-Days. E-Days continues with field events, tech demos, concerts, comedians, manual mining competitions, and a trebuchet contest. The next morning, teams race cardboard boats down Clear Creek, competing to see which team sails the farthest before sinking. A carnival is held during the day and the Formula SAE club hosts a car show.

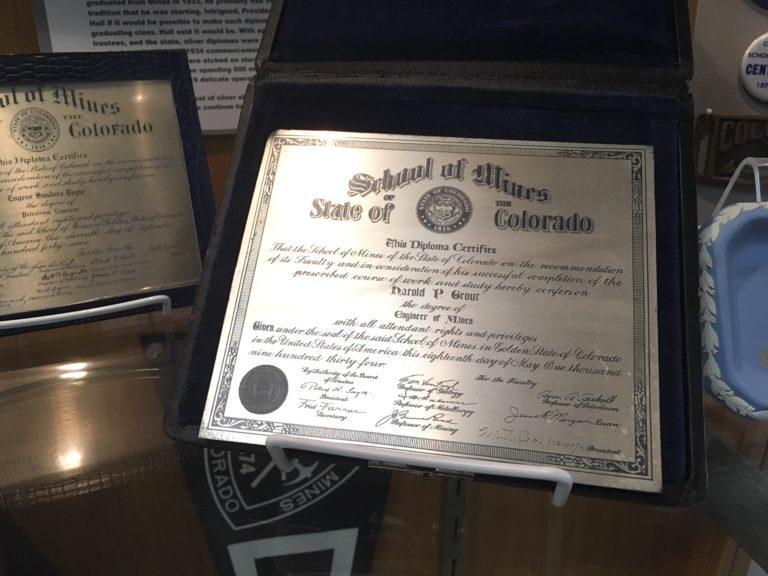
A Silver metal Mines Diploma

=== Silver Diplomas ===
The tradition of awarding silver diplomas was started in 1934 by Charles Hull, an Instrument Designer at Mines. Since then, every graduate receives a silver diploma upon graduation from Mines. In 1935, President Herbert Hoover, who was a guest at the commencement ceremonies, was awarded an honorary Doctorate of Engineering for his contribution in translating De re metallica from Latin to English.

=== Blaster the Burro ===
In the 1930s, a Golden local began to bring his burro to football games. The burro quickly became the school mascot, now known as "Blaster the Burro". Blaster is represented by two separate burros, both racing burros from Idaho Springs, Colorado. Both are known as Blaster while at Mines.

=== Engineer's Hats ===
Around 1890 as a celebration of graduation, graduates of Mines received their "Engineer's" hat. These hats were worn by engineers while working underground, and whenever a visitor to a mine wanted to talk to the engineer, they were told to go find the guy in the funny hat. Today, graduates receive one of two versions of the Engineer's hat, to be signed and branded upon graduation.

== Athletics ==
Colorado School of Mines was ranked best NCAA DII school in the U.S. for student-athletes, according to Next College Student Athlete's 2025 NCSA Power Rankings. The NCSA Power Rankings recognize the best colleges and universities in the U.S. for student-athletes.

In 2022, the Orediggers won their third national title in men's cross country, posting the largest margin of victory in meet history with 143-points. In December 2022, Oredigger football played in their first NCAA Division II national championship in McKinney, Texas, and lost to Ferris State 41-14.

== Notable alumni ==
There are over 38,000 Colorado School of Mines Alumni working in various sectors, including engineering, entrepreneurial, corporate, medical, military, research, and public service positions. The Colorado School of Mines Foundation supports alumni "M-Clubs", interest groups, and events across the United States and internationally.

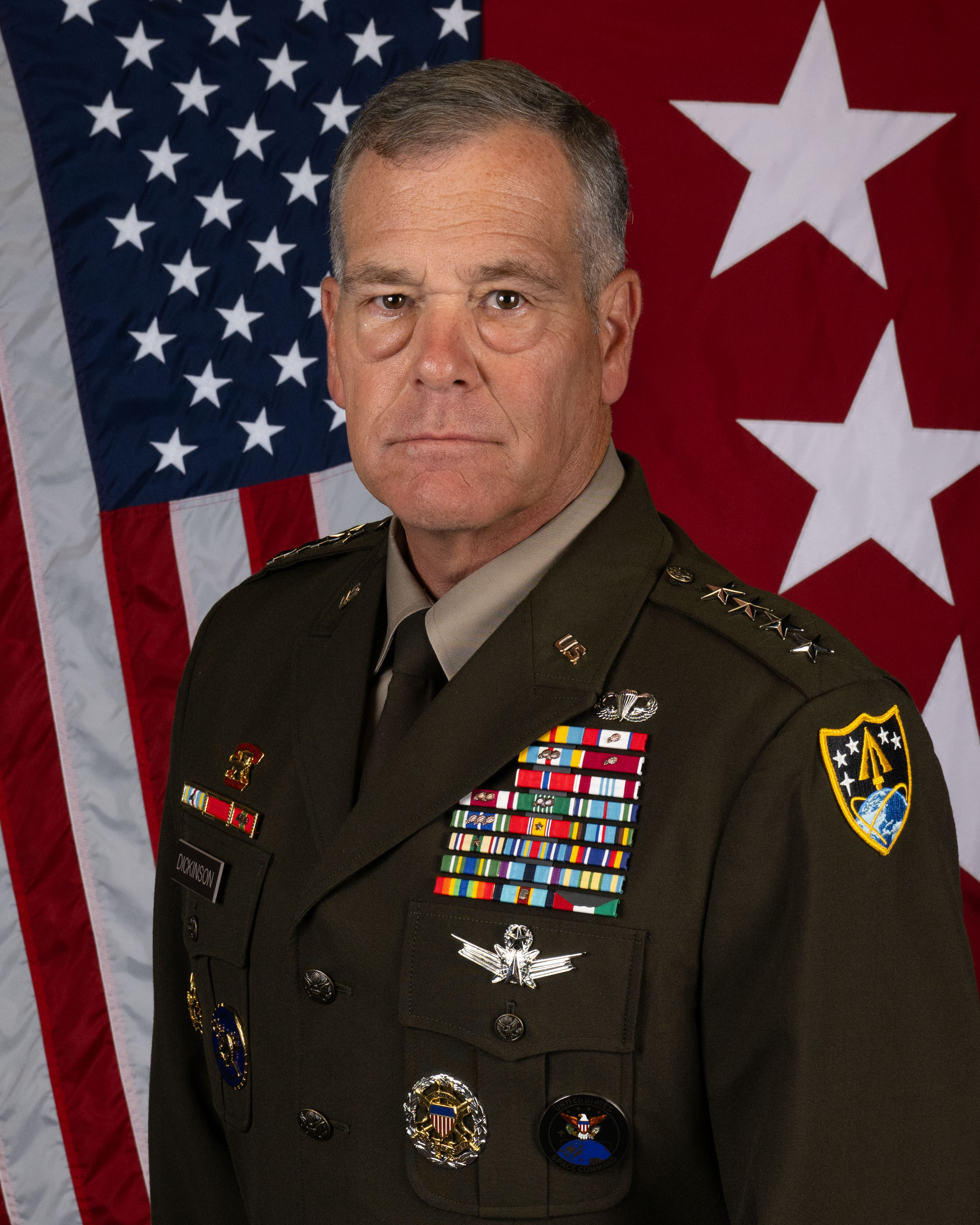
James H. Dickinson
commander of the United States Space Command (2020–2024)

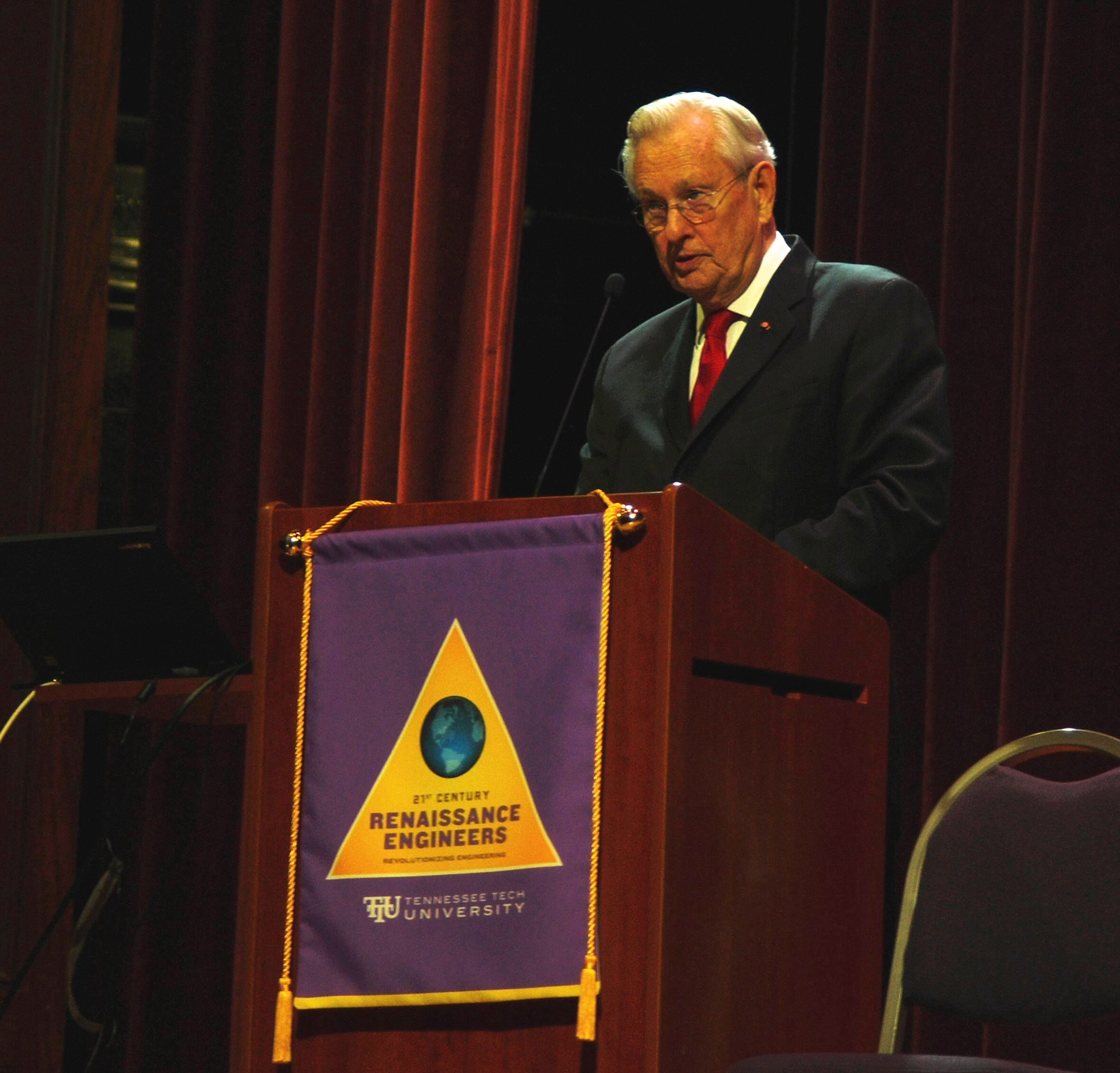
Arden L. Bement Jr.
former director of the National Science Foundation (NSF) and the National Institute of Standards and Technology (NIST)

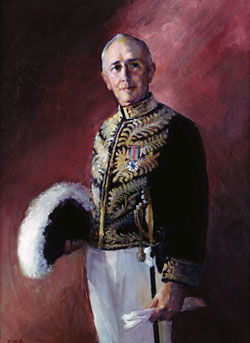
Charles Arthur Banks
17th Lieutenant Governor of British Columbia

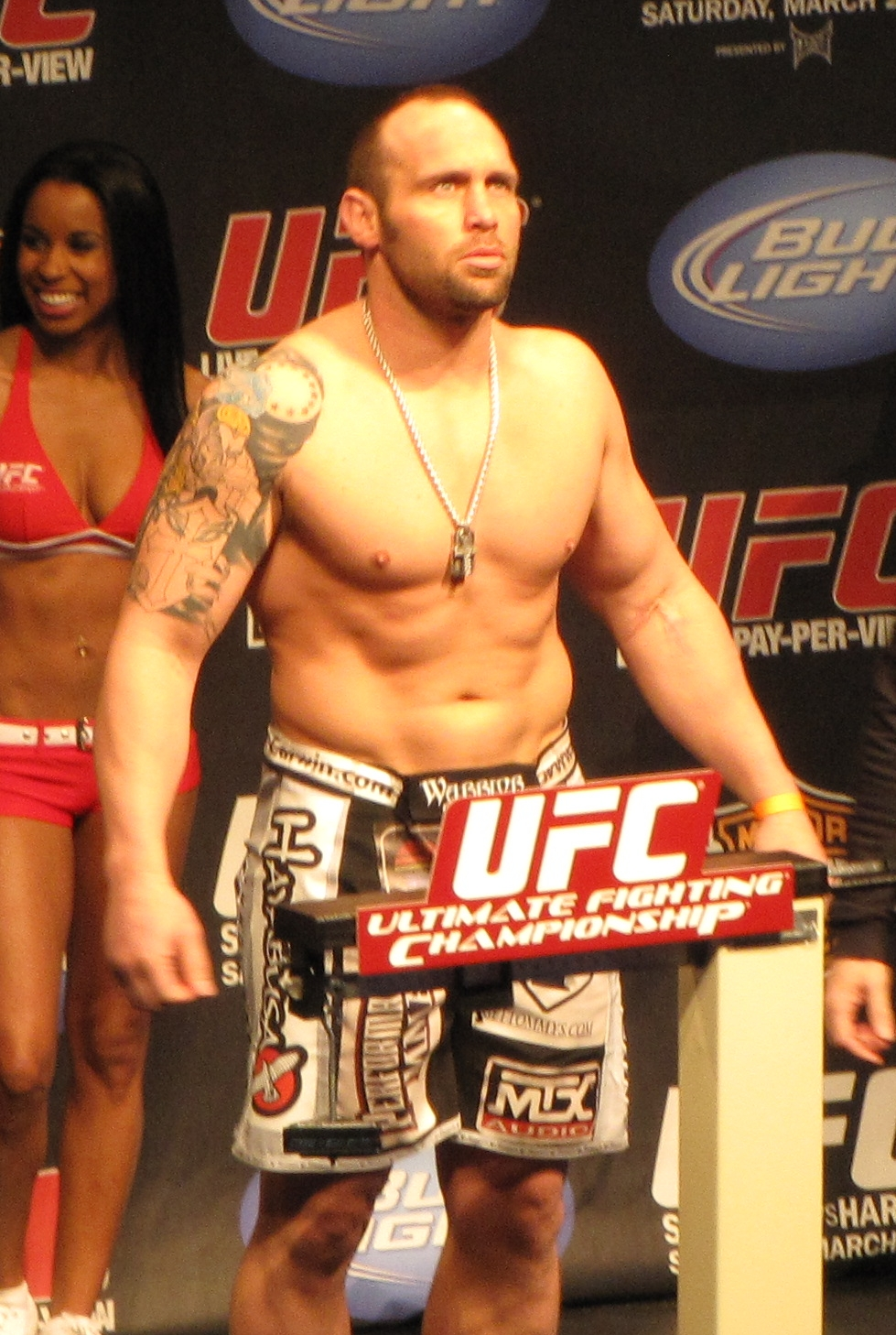
Shane Carwin
UFC fighter

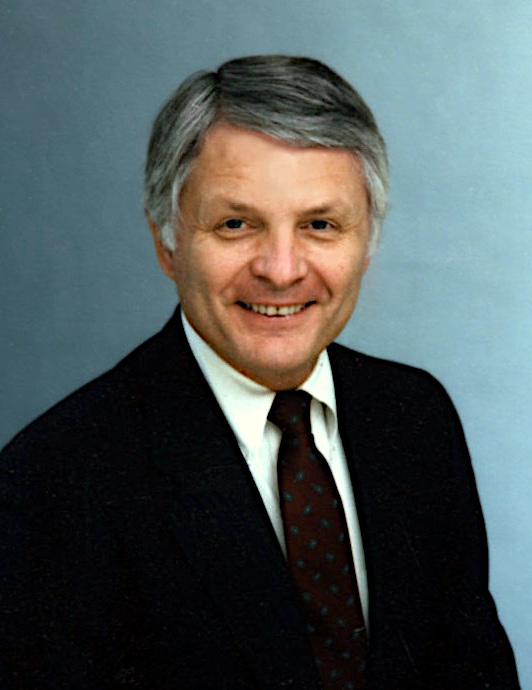
Joseph Robert Wright Jr.
27th Director of the Office of Management and Budget

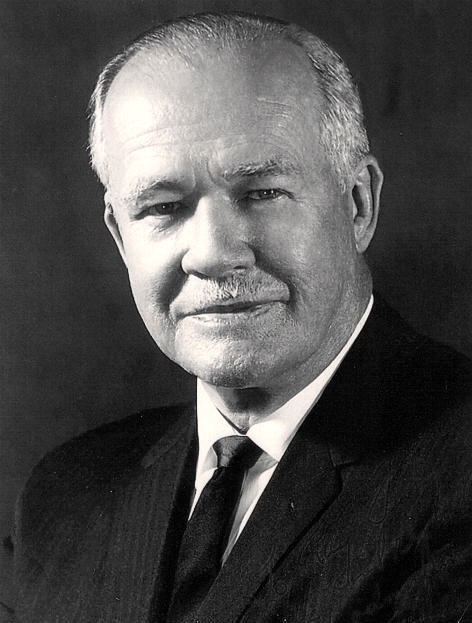
Wendell Fertig
civil engineer, organized and commanded an American-Filipino guerrilla force on the Japanese-occupied Philippines during World War II

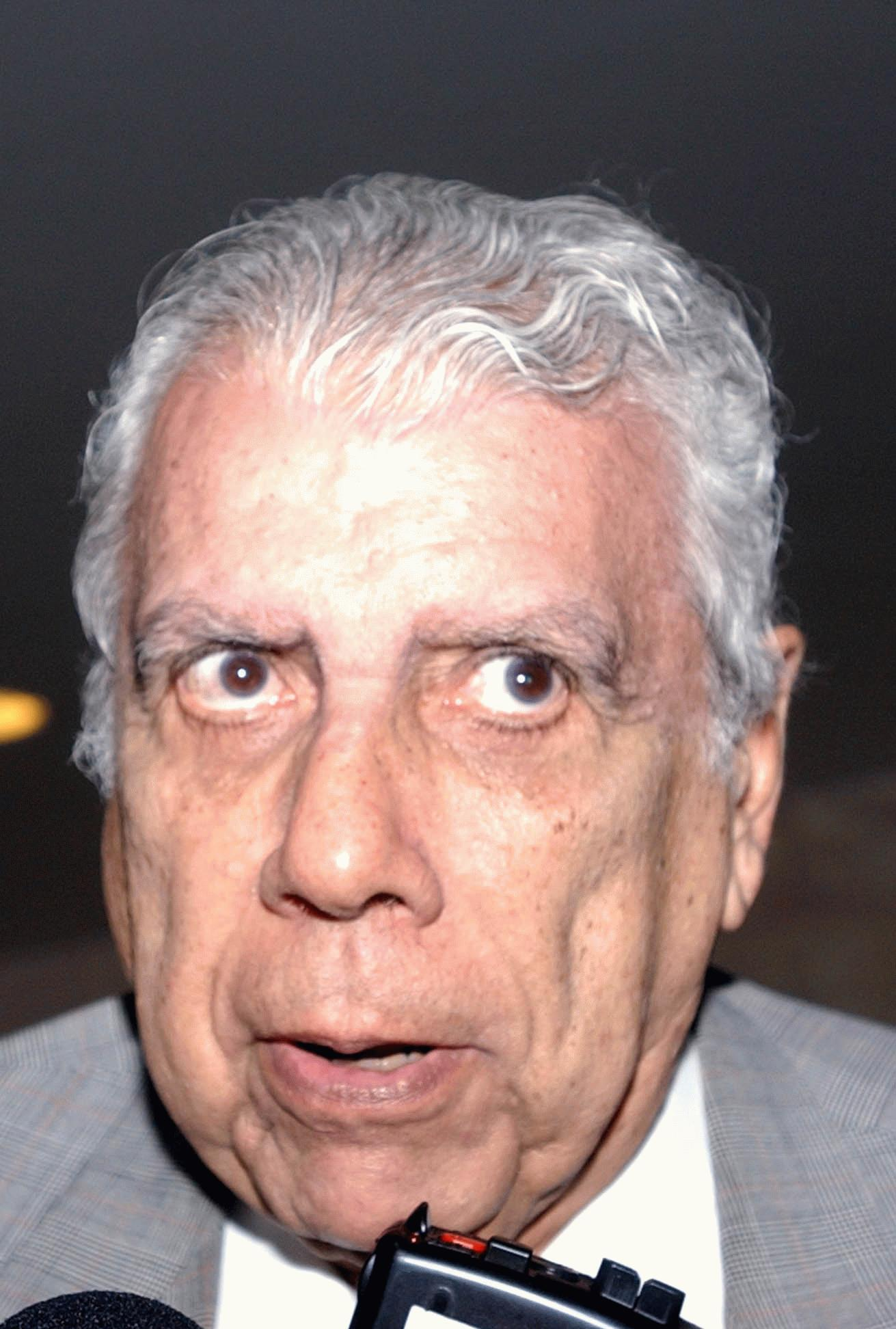
Antônio Ermírio de Moraes
Brazilian billionaire businessman and the chairman of the Votorantim Group

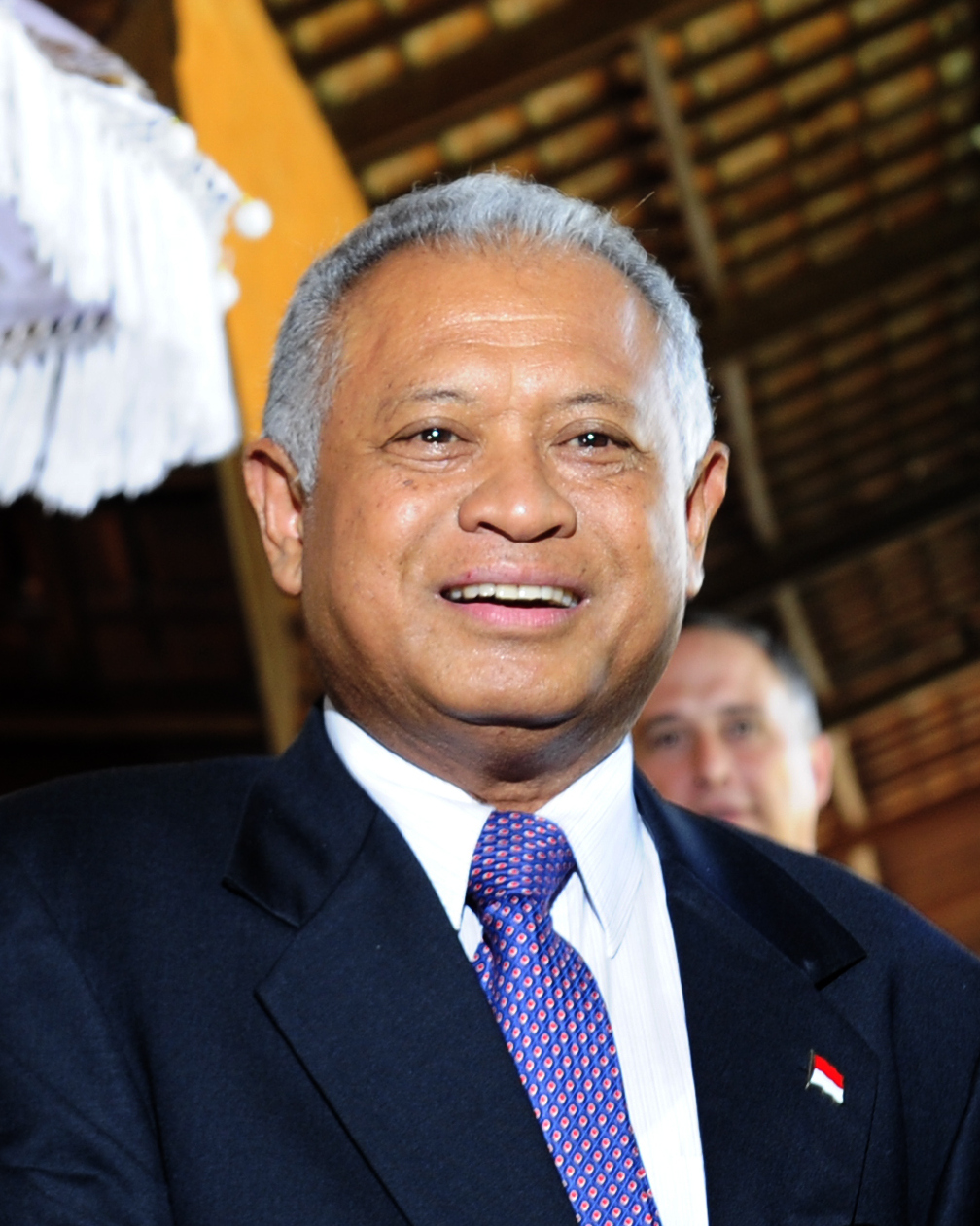
Purnomo Yusgiantoro
president-secretary general of OPEC, former Indonesian Minister of Energy for three presidents, and former Minister of Defense in the Second United Indonesia Cabinet

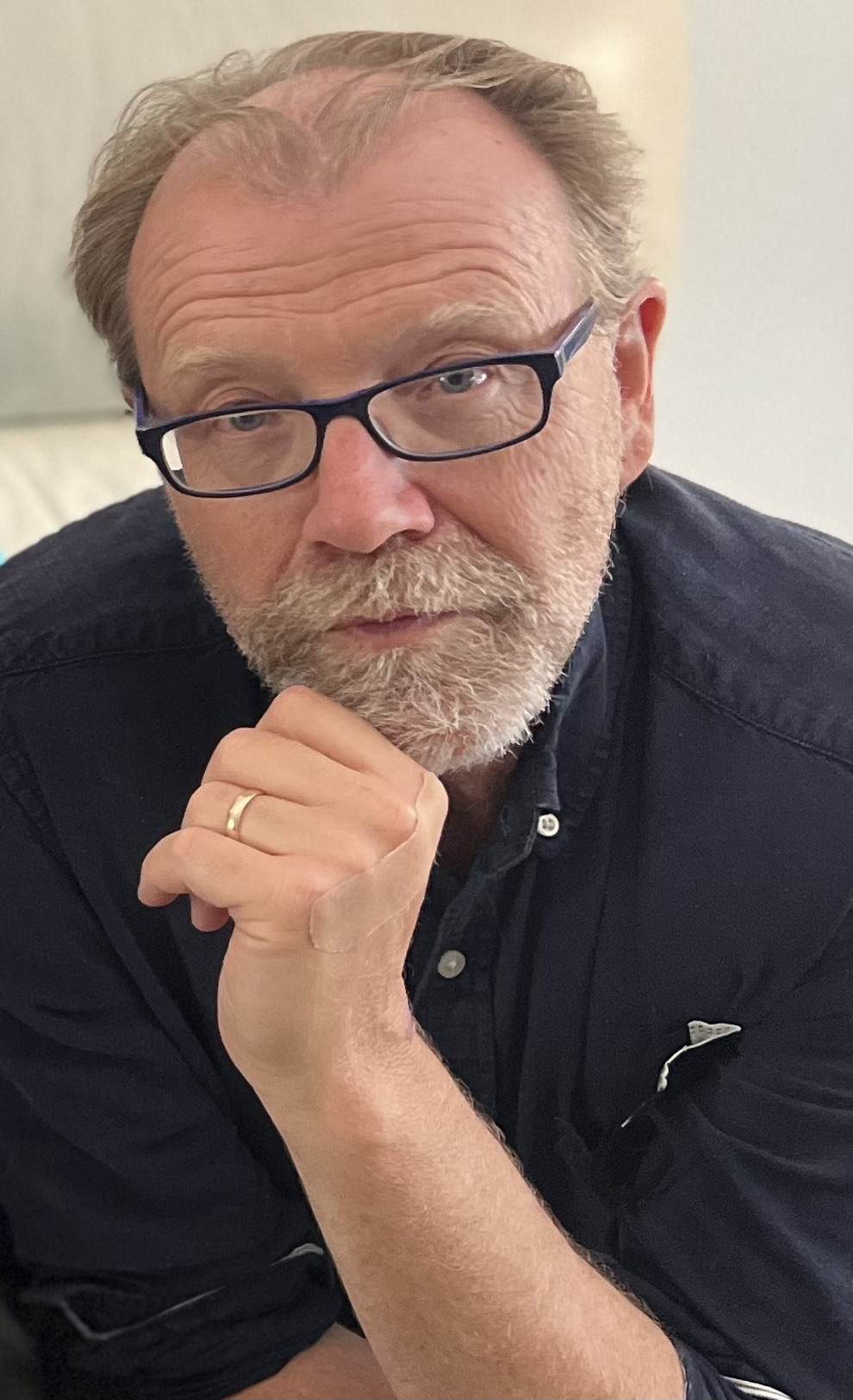
George Saunders
award-winning American writer of short stories, essays, novellas, children's books, and novels. Professor at Syracuse University.

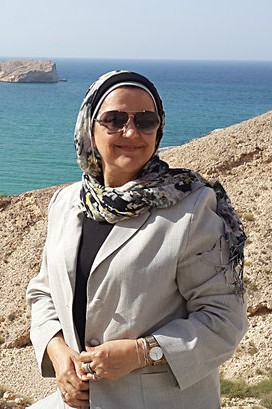
Souad Naji Al-Azzawi
Iraqi environmentalist, academic researcher, and winner of the Nuclear-Free Future Award

== See also ==
- Colorado lunar sample displays
- List of schools of mines
