= Book of Common Prayer (1979) =

American Anglican prayer book

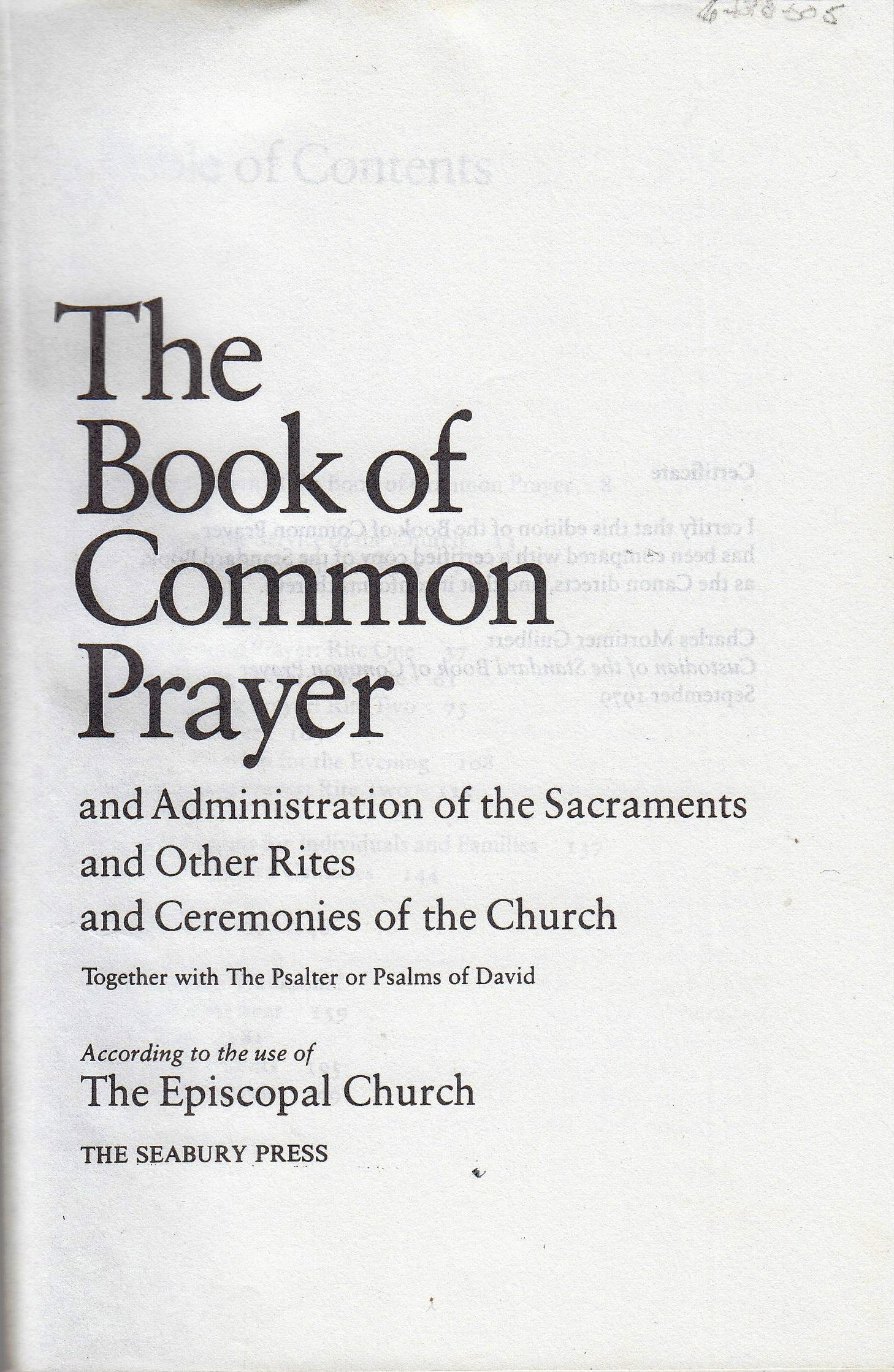
Title page of the 1979 Book of Common Prayer

The 1979 Book of Common Prayer (Note: The official full name of the text is The Book of Common Prayer; and Administration of the Sacraments and Other Rites and Ceremonies of the Church, Together with the Psalms of David, According to the use of The Episcopal Church, following titling conventions extant from the initial period of prayer book production.) is the official primary liturgical book of the U.S.-based Episcopal Church. An edition in the same tradition as other versions of the Book of Common Prayer used by the churches within the Anglican Communion and Anglicanism generally, it contains both the forms of the Eucharistic liturgy and the Daily Office, as well as additional public liturgies and personal devotions. It is the fourth major revision of the Book of Common Prayer adopted by the Episcopal Church, and succeeded the 1928 edition. The 1979 Book of Common Prayer has been translated into multiple languages and is considered a representative production of the 20th-century Liturgical Movement.

== Background ==
Following the English Reformation and the separation of the Church of England from the Catholic Church, the liturgies of Anglicanism were transcribed into English. The first such production was the 1549 Book of Common Prayer, traditionally considered to be work of Thomas Cranmer, which replaced both the missals and breviaries of Catholic usage. Among these liturgies were the Communion service and canonical hours of Matins and Evensong, with the addition of the Ordinal containing the form for the consecration of bishops, priests, and deacons in 1550. Under Edward VI, the 1552 Book of Common Prayer incorporated more radically Protestant reforms, a process that continued with 1559 edition approved under Elizabeth I. The 1559 edition was for some time the second-most diffuse book in England, behind only the Bible, through an act of Parliament that mandated its presence in each parish church across the country.

=== American prayer books ===
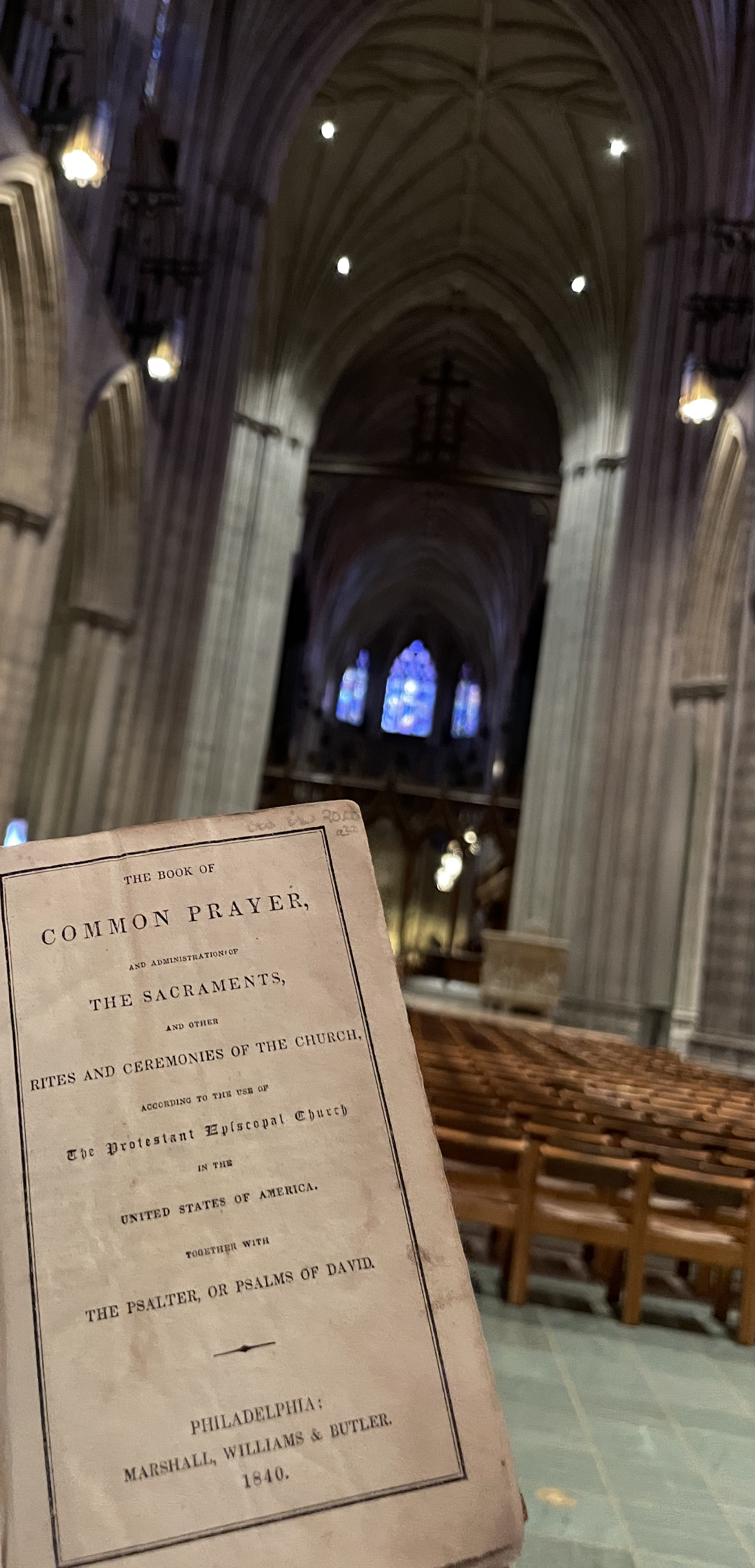
Cover page of a 1789 U.S. Book of Common Prayer inside the Washington National Cathedral, Washington, D.C.

Prior to the consecration of Samuel Seabury by the Episcopal Church of Scotland as the first American Anglican bishop to not accept the English Crown and the establishment of the independent Episcopal Church after the American Revolutionary War, the Church of England had operated in what would become the United States using the liturgies as defined in the 1662 Book of Common Prayer. Pennsylvanian Episcopal priests William Smith and William White created the first widely used American edition of the prayer book in 1786 as a "proposed" text based on the 1662 prayer book. A further revision with a greater departure from the English 1662 edition was approved for regular usage by the newly established Episcopal Church in 1789. Notably, the Eucharistic prayers of this approved edition included a similar Epiclesis invoking the Holy Spirit as that present in Eastern Christian rituals and the Episcopal Church of Scotland's liturgy. Proposals to remove the Nicene and Athanasian Creeds faced successful objections from both a caucus of High Church Virginians and English bishops who had been consulted on the prayer book's production.

Revisions of the 1789 Book of Common Prayer, known as "Standard Editions", (Note: Not to be confused with the standard editions by which Episcopal prayer books are compared for certification, which are currently defined by Canon 3, Title II of the Constitutions and Canons of the Episcopal Church.) were promulgated by the General Convention in 1793, 1822, 1832, 1838, 1845, and 1871 with notes regarding changes. It is from 1789 edition that the 1979 Book of Common Prayer derives two introductory texts: "The Ratification of The Book of Common Prayer (1789)" and the preface.

The 1789 edition would be replaced in 1892 by a new edition of the prayer book considered a "conservative" revision of its predecessor. The 1892 Book of Common Prayer was the first American prayer book to have a standard edition made which further printings were to be compared against and inserted rubrical emphasis on offering Communion to all present. Among the alterations were several derived from edits in a draft liturgy produced by the Scottish Episcopal Church in 1889. The limited scope of the revision resulted in only a comparatively brief usage of the 1892 edition, with work commencing in 1913 on what would ultimately result in the 1928 edition.

Following a more than decade-long process of revision, the 1928 Book of Common Prayer was adopted. Besides altering the language as to sound more contemporary, the 1928 edition also omitted the office for the visitation of prisoners (introduced in the 1789 edition) as well as other components deemed outdated. The revision also sought to eschew perceived "medieval" and "pagan" qualities, such as reference to God's anger, as well as altering prayers to remove "extreme Calvinism." The then-Custodian of the Standard Book of Common Prayer John Wallace Suter lauded the 1928 for its "new flexibility" and considered it as a text to be used continuously through the life of both the laity and clergy.

== Development ==
=== Liturgical Movement and trial liturgies ===
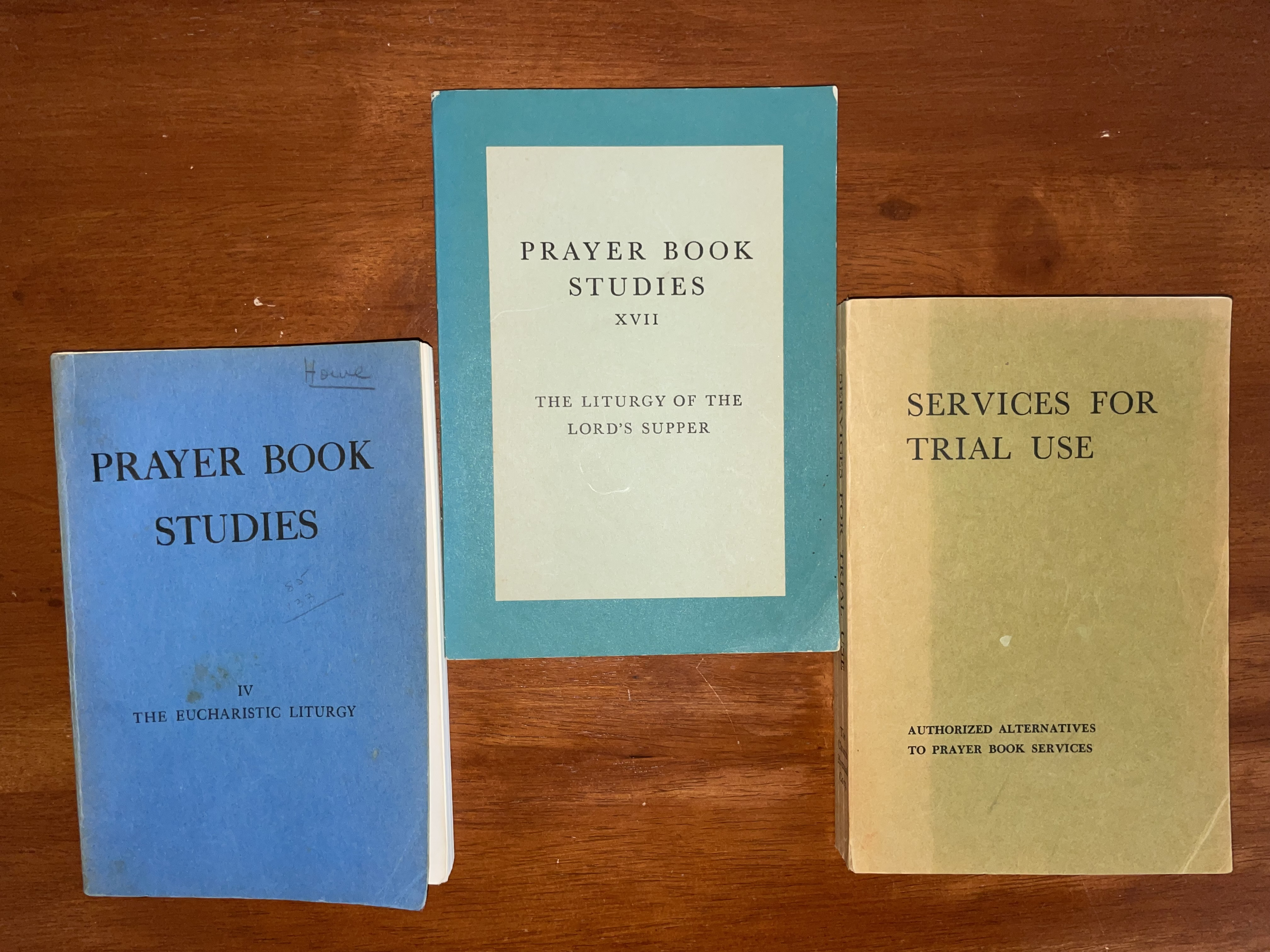
Test and trial Eucharistic liturgies.

The Second Vatican Council and the Catholic Church's adoption of the Mass in the vernacular as standard during the process of aggiornamento represented a significant high point in the influence of the Liturgical Movement, a loose effort to improve Christian worship practices across denominational lines. Previous to that, in 1959, the Anglican Church of Canada had proposed a new edition of the Book of Common Prayer that was formally adopted by their General Synod as the 1962 prayer book. Such events were considered by the leadership of the Episcopal Church as reflective of a need for new prayer book revision.

Even prior to these developments, early proponents of the Liturgical Movement within Episcopal Church had laid the groundwork for revision. Among them were William Palmer Ladd, Massey H. Shepherd, Edward L. Parsons, and Bayard Hale Jones. Parsons and Jones, after publishing the influential history The American Prayer Book in 1937, served on the Episcopal Church's Standing Liturgical Commission. This commission produced a series of publications called Prayer Book Studies, reviewing key elements of prayer book history and production. Within their 1950 study on baptism, confirmation, and the lectionary, the commission criticized the "abrupt conclusion" to the 1928 prayer book's revision process and lamented that there had not been opportunity to incorporate elements from the Church of England's 1928 English proposed prayer book and the Scottish Episcopal Church's 1929 Scottish Prayer Book. The commission also stated that, despite these criticisms, it did not propose "any immediate revision."

Within the Prayer Book Studies program, several liturgies were developed, including two increments of the Holy Eucharist liturgy in 1953 and 1966. The New Liturgy, also published in 1966, closely mirrored the Communion office in that year's Prayer Book Studies XVII. It featured the deletion of the Filioque from the Nicene Creed, a move that would remain in the prayer book proposals through 1976.

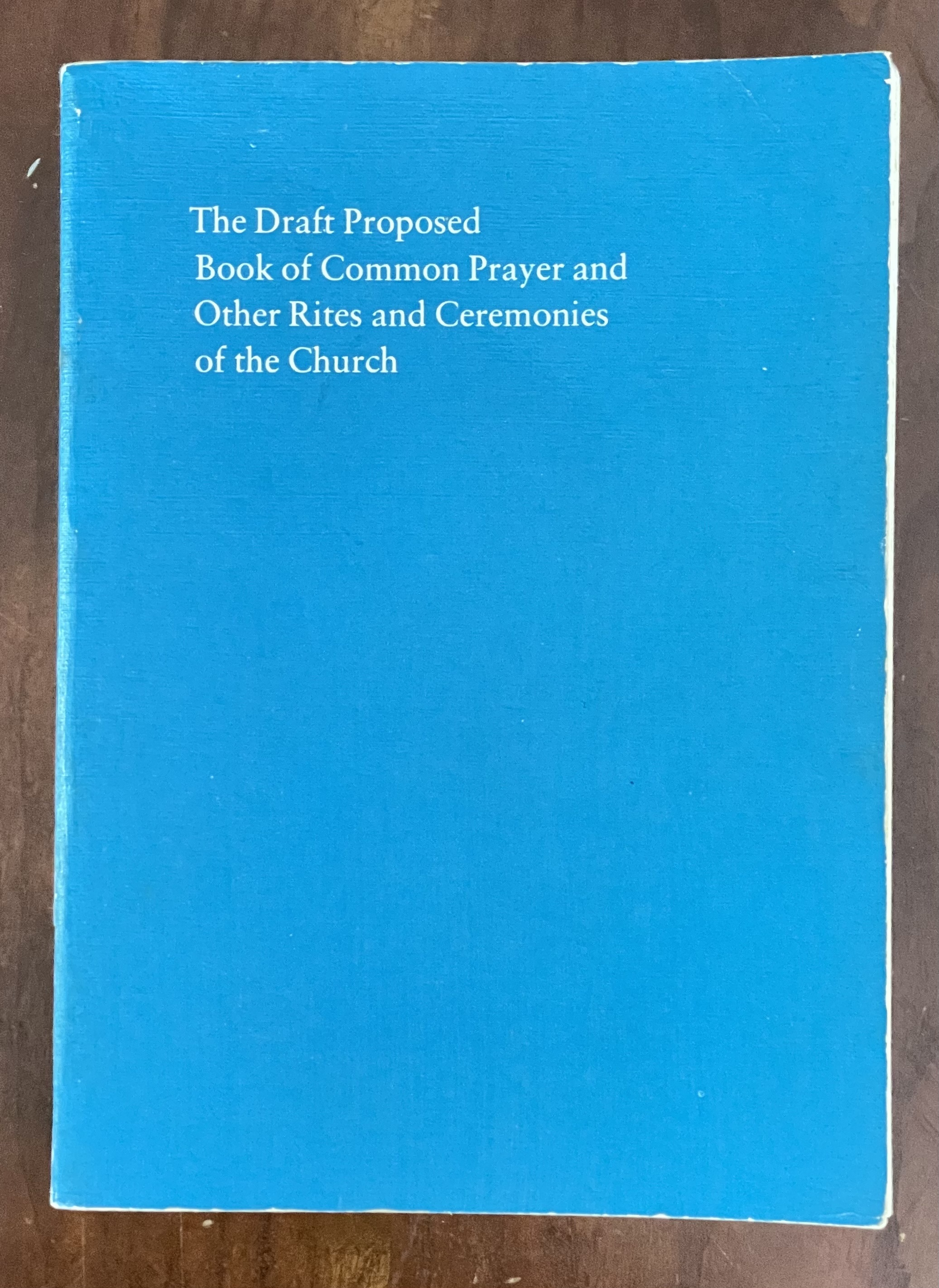
The Draft Proposed Book of Common Prayer of 1976 excluded the Filioque from the Nicene Creed.

At the 1967 General Convention, the Standing Liturgical Commission submitted a new Eucharistic liturgy which was approved and published for trial use as The Liturgy of the Lord's Supper. A broader revision was approved at the 1970 General Convention, including a new lectionary and forms for the Daily Office and ordinations, as the Services for Trial Use–known as the "Green Book" for its cover. Further revision resulted in the Authorized Services 1973–known as the "Zebra Book", also for its cover. The Zebra Book included the same pattern of parallel traditional-language and contemporary-language forms for certain prayers and rites.

The proposals with multiple options for the same offices drew complaints that the new productions were "no longer a book of common prayer but of common services." Urban T. Holmes III, a prominent Episcopal priest, contended that the liturgists developing the 1979 prayer book had to respond to a theological crisis that saw them draw on liturgies from before the 1549 prayer book while making a more 20th-century theological statement.

=== Proposal and approval ===
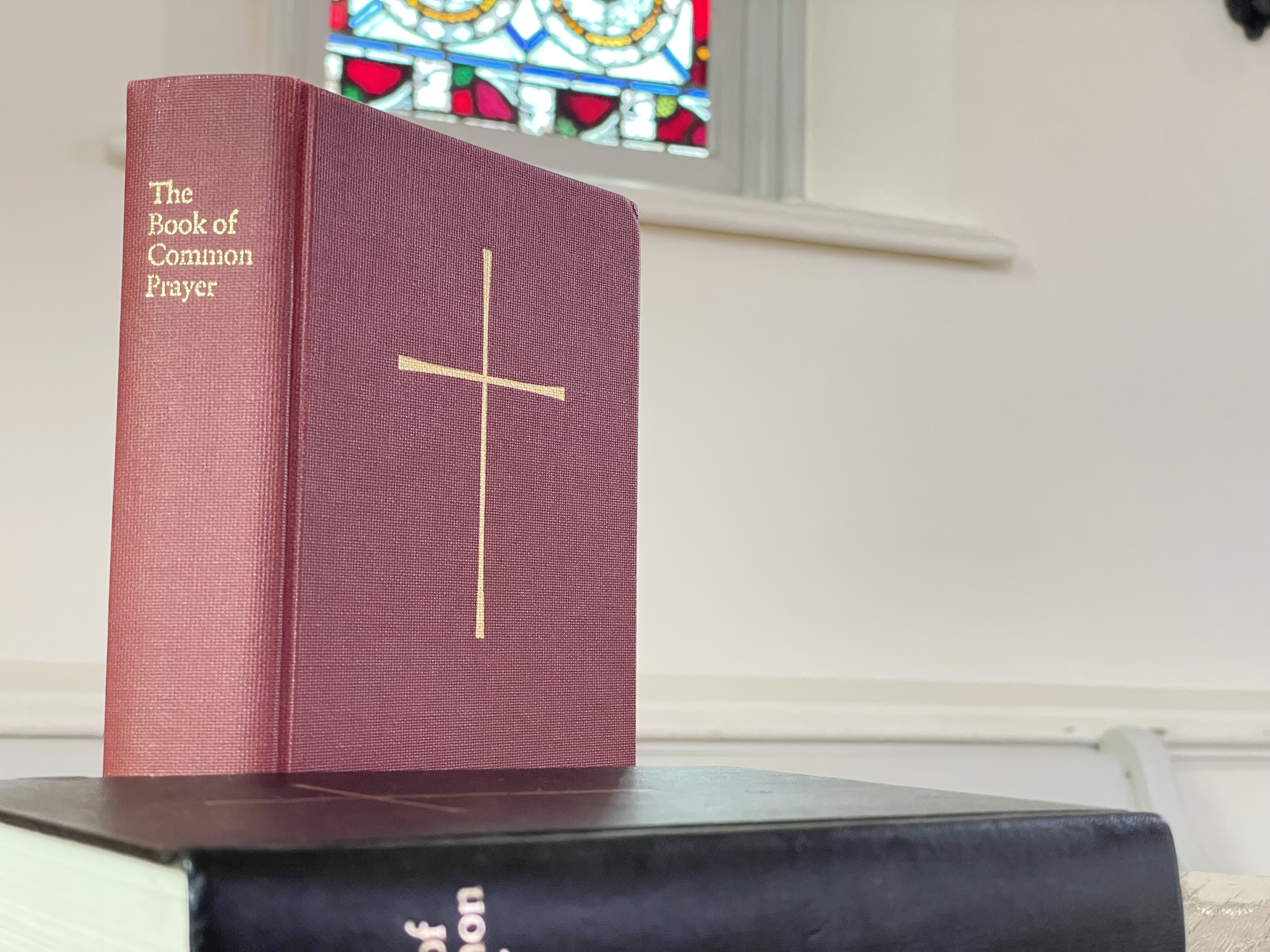
Copies of the 1977 proposed prayer book (black) and 1979 approved edition (red).

The 1976 General Convention approved the usage of a proposed new revision of the Book of Common Prayer by a wide margin. It was also at this General Convention that the ordination of women was approved within the Episcopal Church. This new prayer book, The Proposed Book of Common Prayer, included a preceding "certificate" from Custodian of the Standard Book of Common Prayer Charles Mortimer Guillbert dated to January 1977 that described the text as "a revision of The Book of Common Prayer (1928)" and approved its usage backdated to the First Sunday of Advent, 1976, through a period of three years. The Proposed Book of Common Prayer was adopted by the 1979 General Convention in Denver as the official liturgy of the Episcopal Church.

Article X of the Constitutions and Canons of the Episcopal Church provides that "The Book of Common Prayer, as now established or hereafter amended by the authority of this Church, shall be in use in all the Dioceses of this Church." The Canon 3 of Title II of the Constitutions and Canons established that this prayer book is that adopted in 1979. In 2000, the General Convention passed a resolution apologizing to those who "were offended or alienated by inappropriate or uncharitable behavior during the time of transition to the 1979 Book of Common Prayer." The resolution specified Native Americans as especially adversely impacted by the revision process.

Episcopal Church canon law requires the production of a Standard Edition copy from which the Custodian of the Standard Book of Common Prayer is to compare all printings of approved editions of the Book of Common Prayer for certification. Such books were extravagantly bound in the cases of the 1892 and 1928 editions. However, while a prospectus was published advertising additional copies bound to the specifications of the Standard Edition to be purchased by the general public, both these and the Standard Edition itself were never produced. The prospectus lists that up 275 copies of the 1979 Standard Edition could be produced, with the price set at $2,000. Despite this, all copies of the 1979 prayer book bear a certification stating that each edition "has been compared with a certified copy of the Standard Book, as the Canon directs, and that it conforms thereto," followed by the name of the custodian at date of print.

== Contents ==
Besides prayers, offices, and devotions, the 1979 prayer book includes a number of supplementary texts and essays. These include the certification from the Custodian of the Standard Book of Common Prayer, the 1789 prayer book's "Ratification" and preface, a catechism, and explanatory essays preceding certain offices. Additionally, the "Historical Documents of the Church" section contains the Chalcedonian creed on Christ's natures, the Athanasian Creed, the preface to the 1549 prayer book, and the 1801 American version of the Articles of Religion.

=== Two-rite arrangement ===
The 1979 edition of the Book of Common Prayer was intended to contain all the regular public liturgies used within the Episcopal Church, with only limited additional variety permitted by specific exemptions. It features two forms for the Holy Eucharist and for Morning and Evening Prayer. The Rite I services keep most of the language of the 1928 edition and older books, while Rite II uses contemporary language and offers a mixture of newly composed texts. Some Rite II prayers were adapted from the older forms, and some borrowed from other sources, notably the Byzantine Rite. The majority of Episcopal parishes have adopted Rite II services as their standard.

In the context of the newly introduced Proper Liturgies for Special Days and other offices rendered exclusively in contemporary language, the essay "Concerning the Service of the Church" provides permissions to conform them to Rite I language in the contexts of those services. The essay also notes that all Biblical quotation within the prayer book–except the Psalms–are from the Revised Standard Version translation.

=== Holy Eucharist ===
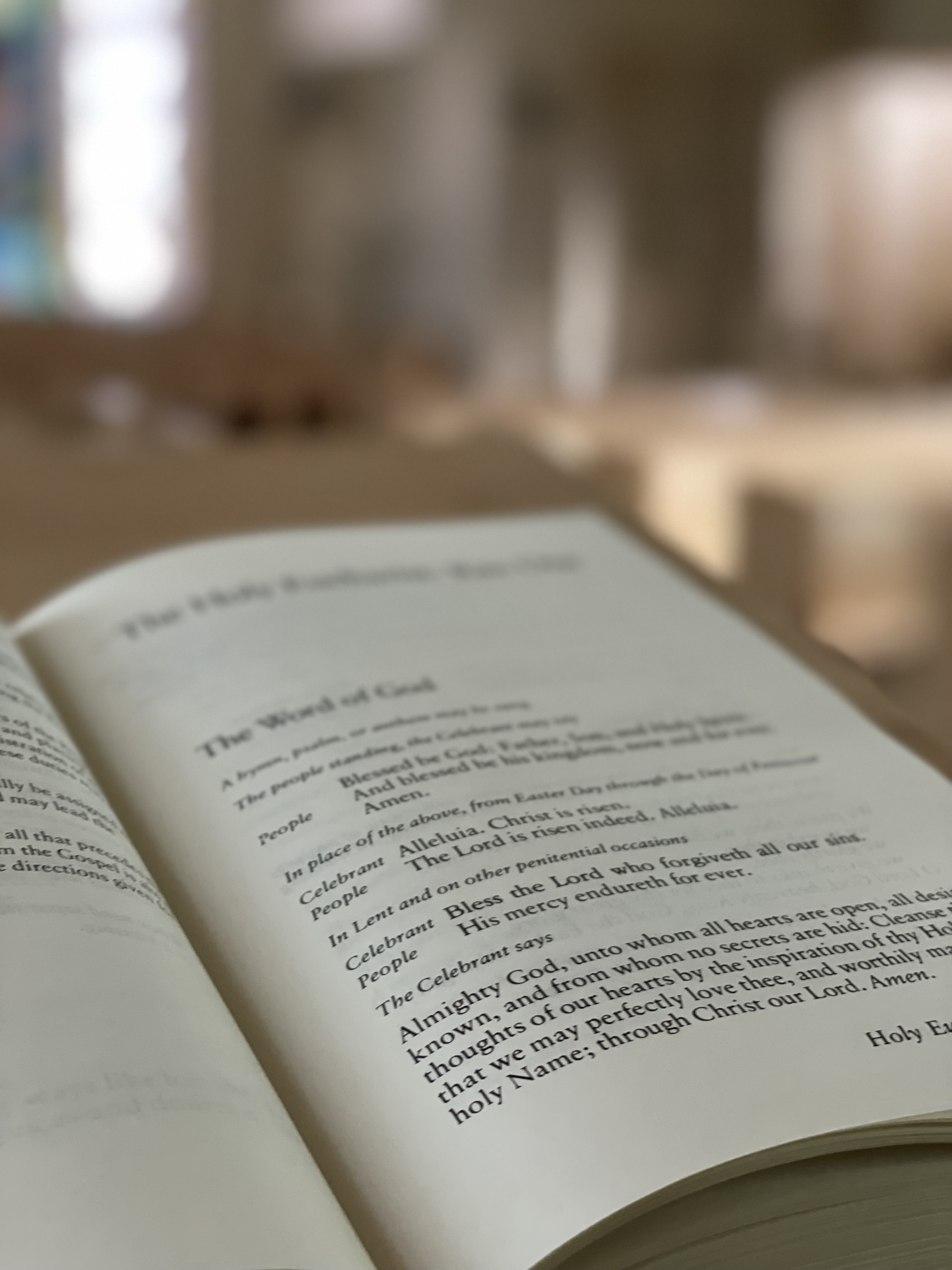
The 1979 Holy Eucharist, Rite I.

The Holy Eucharist liturgy of the 1979 prayer book is also entitled "The Liturgy for the Proclamation of the Word of God and Celebration of the Holy Communion" and is considered "the principal act of worship on the Lord's Day and other major Feasts" on the Episcopal calendar. Within the Episcopal Church, all persons baptized in the Trinitarian formula are permitted to receive the Eucharist.

The Rite I Holy Eucharistic liturgy contains two Eucharistic prayers, while the Rite II liturgy contains four: A, B, C, and D. The usage of a given Eucharistic prayer during specific liturgical seasons is not defined by the 1979 prayer book, but it is common for the Rite I liturgy to be used during Lent. Eucharistic prayer C of Rite II is often called the "Star Wars" and "Star Trek prayer" for its reference to "vast expanses of interstellar space, galaxies, suns, the planets in their courses, and this fragile Earth, our island home." The primary editor of the 1979 prayer book, Howard E. Galley, Jr., is credited with authoring Eucharistic prayer C.

Within the Rite I form, provisions are made for the repetition of one of four selection of Scripture sentences, known as “comfortable words." Additionally, the Agnus Dei and Prayer of Humble Access may be said. The 1979 prayer book's version of the Prayer of Humble Access is altered from the 1548 original version, omitting the line "that our sinful bodies may be made clean by his body, and our souls washed by his most precious blood."

The collects–short devotional prayers for particular feasts–for Holy Communion services are rearranged from prior prayer book versions but retain many of the translations produced by Cranmer.

=== Daily Office ===
The first section of prayers, immediately following the kalendar, is the Daily Office. The Daily Office utilizes a division of the Psalms in which all 150 are read each month during complete recitation, keeping with Cranmerite practices initiated in the 1549 prayer book. The 1979 prayer book introduced two additional liturgies to Episcopal Daily Office: An Order of Worship for the Evening (also known by the Latin name lucernarium) and Compline.

Like other editions of the Book of Common Prayer, the 1979 edition contains each Psalm present in the Bible. In preparing the 1979 prayer book, new translations of the Psalms were executed, with the translations placing an emphasis on their poetic qualities alongside their liturgical importance; the "Concerning the Psalter" essay within the 1979 prayer book refers to the Psalter as "a body of liturgical poetry." These translations utilize "Hallelujah" transliterated from Hebrew in preference over the English translation "Praise the Lord" and Latin transliteration "Alleluia."

=== Pastoral Offices ===
The Burial of the Dead is presented with both a Rite I and Rite II option. A more minimalist Order for Burial is used "when, for pastoral considerations, neither of the burial rites in this Book is deemed appropriate". The 1979 prayer book's rubrics, drawing from early Christian practices, encourage the baptismal liturgy to be performed alongside Holy Communion on major feasts so that it might be a more public event.

== Reception and influence ==
=== Episcopal Church ===
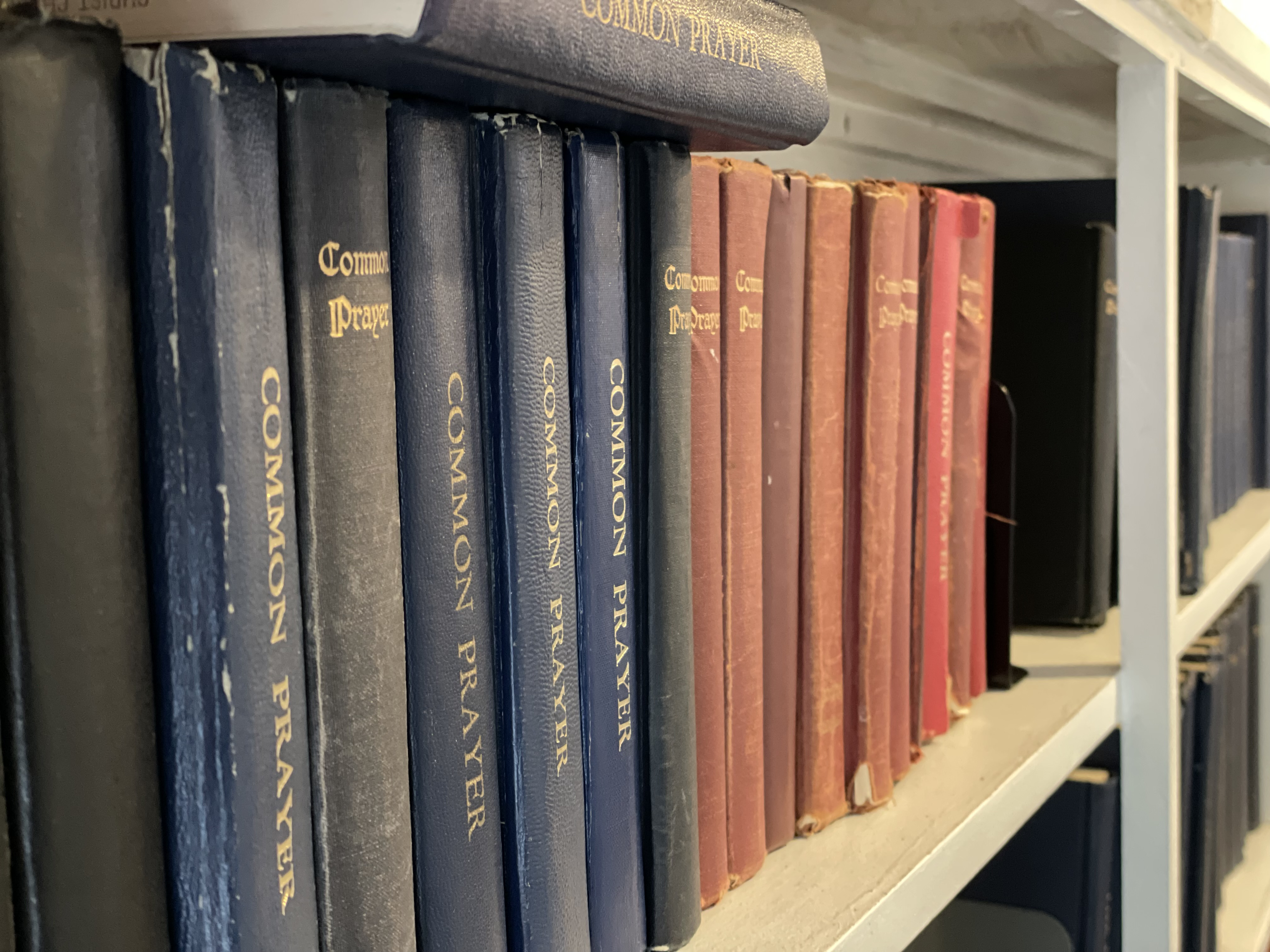
Copies of the 1928 prayer book inside an Anglican Catholic Church parish.

All Episcopal Church congregations are to use the 1979 prayer book for worship. The integral options, such as the Rite I and Rite II Holy Eucharists and "open-ended" marriage and burial offices, are described as offering "unity in the midst of diversity".

Anglo-catholic Episcopalians such as members of the Society of the Holy Cross would welcome the addition of certain prayers brought by the 1979 prayer book, particularly the Proper Liturgies for Special Days and prayers for the dead. In 1991, the Church of the Good Shepherd, an Anglo-catholic parish in Rosemont, Pennsylvania, published the Anglican Service Book as a "traditional language adaptation of the 1979 Book of Common Prayer." Besides offering the Rite I services of the 1979 prayer book, it also rendered into traditional language those prayers previously only offered in contemporary language. The Psalter is that of the 1928 prayer book.

Many traditionalists, both Anglo-Catholics and evangelicals, felt alienated by the theological and ritual changes made in the 1979 prayer book, and resisted or looked elsewhere for models of liturgy. Among the grievances were emphasis on contemporaneous qualities, which some contended resulted in "a loss of dignity and beauty in the language of worship." Accordingly, some Episcopal parishes continue to use the 1928 prayer book for their liturgies. The 1979 General Convention that approved the new prayer book also voted to give bishops the ability to grant permission for parishes to use the 1928 prayer book on the grounds that "this action in no way sanctions the existence of two authorized Books of Common Prayer or diminishes the authority of the official liturgy of this Church" and that the 1979 lectionary would be used. The permissions were further defined at the 2000 General Convention, placing them in the same category of other approved supplemental liturgical resources.

Groups in the then-nascent Continuing Anglican movement, such as the Anglican Catholic Church, opposed the introduction of the 1979 prayer book. While not members of the Episcopal Church and Anglican Communion, some of these churches still use the 1928 prayer book of the Episcopal Church alongside other liturgical texts such as the American version of the Anglican Missal. Among the Continuing Anglican criticisms of the 1979 prayer book is the rarity of ad orientem celebration. Some Continuing Anglican denominations founded after the introduction of the 1979 prayer book have cited it, alongside the ordination of women, as a factor in rejecting the Episcopal Church. In one case, an Antiochian Western Rite Vicariate parish was created from an Episcopal congregation that had rejected the 1979 prayer book. Within the Episcopal Church, rejection of the 1979 prayer book has been considered a major source of schism.

=== Catholic Church ===
Following the permission of Anglican clergy and laity to enter into the Catholic Church whilst retaining aspects of their patrimony, the 1979 prayer book was consulted in preparation of ritual books for the new Anglican Use Catholic liturgy. The 1979 Book of Common Prayer largely inspired The Book of Divine Worship of 1983, which mirrored the 1979 prayer book with its own two-rite format but replaced the Anglican Eucharistic prayer with the Roman Canon. The Book of Divine Worship was used through the establishment of the personal ordinariates until 2015 when it was replaced by Divine Worship: The Missal for use in the Mass. The 1979 prayer book was also utilized in the production of the 2019 personal ordinariate devotional book, the St. Gregory's Prayer Book.

=== External reaction ===
The 2019 edition of the Anglican Church of North America's Book of Common Prayer includes a preface by Robert Duncan and Foley Beach, the denomination's first and second primates, who disapprovingly noted the influence of the Liturgical Movement on the 1979 prayer book. The preface criticized the 1979 prayer book, alongside other Anglican prayer books of the same period, as "more revolutionary than evolutionary in character" relative to the 1662 edition. It also questioned the theology of the 20th-century prayer books' Eucharistic and baptism offices.

Historian of liturgy and Greek Catholicism Robert F. Taft, S.J., approved of the 1979 prayer book's "flexibility" and praised it for its restoration of "cathedral elements to evening prayer" but criticized what he viewed as a weakening of Lauds within Morning Prayer.

In 1988, Anglican Episcopal Church of Brazil produced a Portuguese-language prayer book based on the 1979 U.S. prayer book. This follows a tradition of similar translations of U.S. Episcopal Church prayer books being used by Anglicans in Brazil dating to at least 1860.

== Future revision ==
At the 2018 General Convention, a resolution was passed to create the Task Force on Liturgical and Prayer Book Revision. The charge of this group was to "engage worshiping communities in experimentation and the creation of alternative texts" to incorporate more inclusive language and provide a greater focus on the care of God's creation. It also suggested that the Task Force take into consideration new technological means of disseminating the prayer book and to conduct its business in the major languages of The Episcopal Church: English, Spanish, French, and Haitian Creole. Additionally, the task force sought the "creation of alternative texts" by "worshiping communities" to be submitted for review in 2020, with six approved to be further reviewed by the Standing Commission on Liturgy and Music.

The 2021 Reports to the 80th General Convention included reflections from the task force, noting both their continued work on The Book of Occasional Services following the approval of its 2018 edition and progress on prayer book revision. Among these, the task force emphasized the importance of expansive language in for the "principal liturgies (Holy Baptism and Holy Eucharist, Liturgies of the Word, the Psalter)." At the 2022 80th General Convention in Baltimore, a measure that altered the definition of the Book of Common Prayer was adopted, enabling liturgies approved after 1979—such as matrimonial offices for same-sex weddings—to be potentially granted "prayer book status" prior to any full prayer book revision including them.

== Associate texts and supplemental liturgies ==
=== The Hymnal 1982 ===
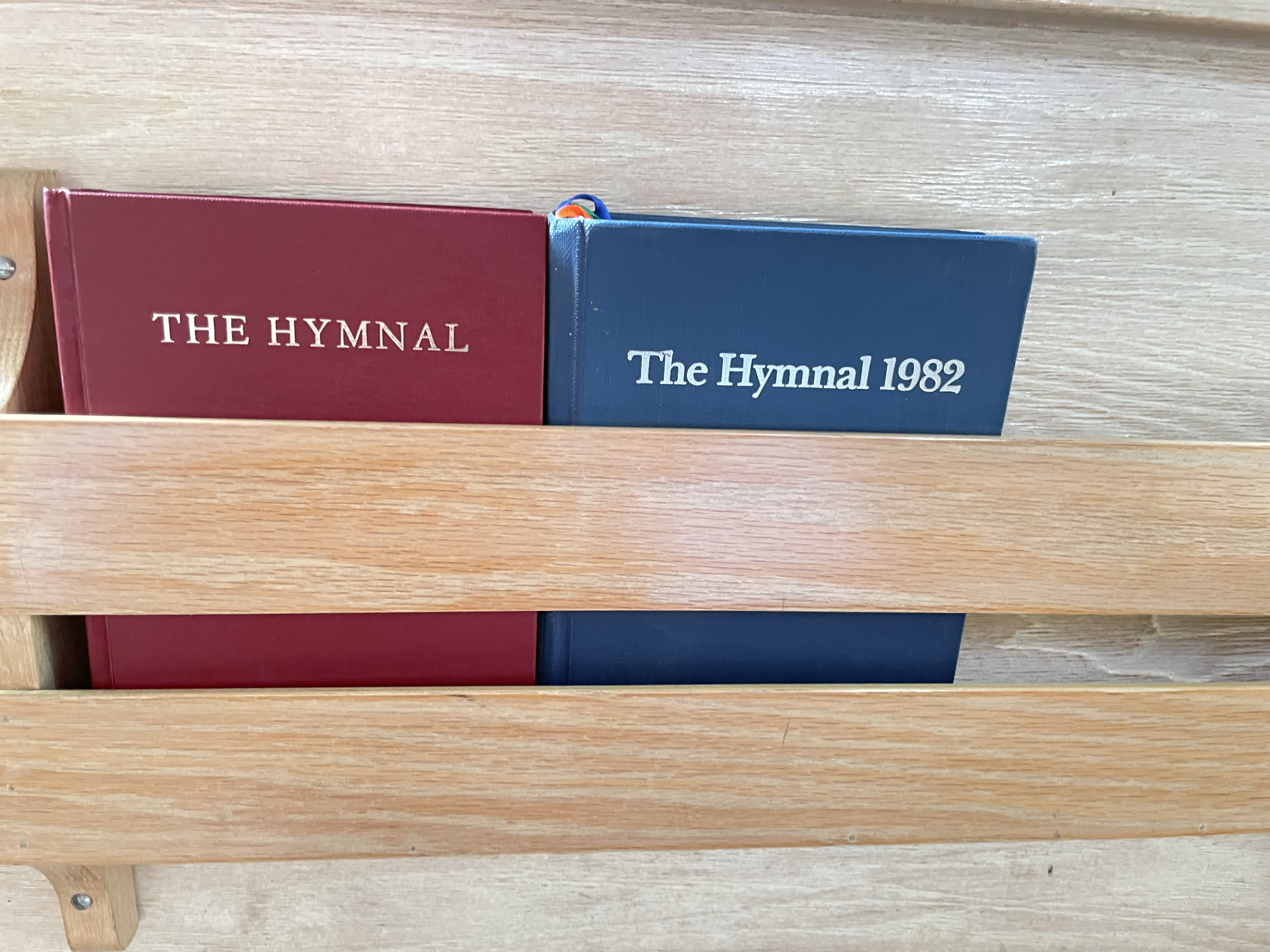
The Hymnal 1940 (left) and The Hymnal 1982

At the time of the 1979 prayer book's initial approval, The Hymnal 1940 was the standard liturgical hymnal of the Episcopal Church. Many of the 801 hymns within The Hymnal 1940 in its 1961 edition intentionally came from an ecumenically-broad assortment of Protestant, Greek, and Latin sources. However, the introduction of the two-rite system into the primary liturgies necessitated an even greater expansion in the variety of the hymn selection available. This was accomplished through the publication of The Hymnal 1982. Published in 1985, the hymnal contains 720 hymns of multiple traditions organized for usage with specific liturgies as well as under specific thematic categories. Canon 24, Section I of the Episcopal Church–included in the front of each copy of The Hymnal 1982–states that it is "the duty of every Minister to see that music is used as an offering to the glory of God." Among the further aims of the 1982 hymnal were to improve ecumenical relations and "restore music which had lost some of its melodic, rhythmic, or harmonic vitality through prior revision.

=== The Book of Occasional Services ===
Concurrent with the adoption of the 1979 prayer book, the 1979 General Convention approved the usage of The Book of Occasional Services (BOS) as an "optional" supplement containing the liturgies not present in the standard prayer book. Similar texts had been approved to supplement prior editions of the Episcopal prayer book, including the 1914 A Book of Offices–the use of which required discretionary approval from the local bishop–and the 1937 The Book of Offices, which was revised in 1949 and 1960. The BOS has been revised several times, including new editions in 1991, 1994, 2003, and 2018. In the 2018 edition, services for the Feast of Our Lady of Guadalupe, the Way of the Cross, and two Lessons and Carols were added.

=== Enriching Our Worship ===
Approved in 1997, Enriching Our Worship 1 was first published in 1998 as a liturgical supplement in Rite II and non-masculine language. It followed the 1991 and 1996 editions of Supplemental Liturgical Materials, and was intended as a further expansion on the texts made available for discretionary usage within those previous publications. Influenced by Christian feminism, the prayers and liturgies contained were drawn from a number of sources, including the Catholic International Commission on English in the Liturgy (ICEL) 1994 translation of the Psalter and Canticles, the Church of Ireland's 1984 An Alternative Prayer Book, and the Anglican Church in Aotearoa, New Zealand and Polynesia's 1989 A New Zealand Prayer Book.

Enriching Our Worship 5, published in 2009, largely pertains to prayers relevant to pregnancy and childbirth. Also contained is the Rite of Repentance and Reconciliation for an Abortion, for women "carrying unresolved guilt over an abortion." The essay preceding the liturgy acknowledges the Episcopal Church's support for legalized abortion.

=== Daily Office supplements ===
==== Daily Office Readings ====
The standard 1979 prayer book prescribes the Daily Office lection cycle for Scripture, though does not include the verses themselves. To provide these readings in the order they are read during the lection cycle, the four-volume Daily Office Readings (DOR) was published in 1984. The readings are divided into two years, with the DOR divided into two volumes for each year, and uses the same Revised Standard Version translation of the 1979 prayer book's included Scriptural texts.

==== Readings for the Daily Office from the Early Church ====
The 1979 prayer book includes instructions permitting the inclusion of readings "from non-biblical Christian literature" following readings from Scripture. While this rubric does not explicitly contain these non-biblical readings to patristic texts, these and other pre-Reformation texts have traditionally been given precedence in Daily Office recitation. The Readings for the Daily Office from the Early Church was published by the Episcopal Church to provide approved pre-Sixteenth Century texts for Daily Office recitation. Many of the texts taken and retranslated from the ICEL work on Office of Readings for the 1975 English translation of the Liturgy of the Hours (the post-Second Vatican Council Catholic daily office) from the 1971 Latin version. Due to the 1979 prayer book lectionary's similarity to that of the Anglican Church of Canada's 1985 Book of Alternative Services and the interdenominational 1978 Lutheran Book of Worship, there was hope for ecumenical usage of the Readings for the Daily Office from the Early Church.

== See also ==
- Alternative Service Book
- Book of Common Prayer (Unitarian)
- Book of Common Prayer (1843 illustrated version)
- Common Worship
- Episcopal Church Service Cross
- Liturgical books of the Presbyterian Church (USA)
