= Vibbert =

Vibbert is a surname. Notable people with the surname include:

- Marie Vibbert (born 1974), American author
- William H. Vibbert (1839–1918), American Hebraist
