= List of colleges and seminaries affiliated with the Episcopal Church =

There are 9 theological seminaries customarily considered to be affiliated with the Episcopal Church in the United States of America, although there is no official process for defining an affiliation.

Several universities and higher education colleges also have Episcopal Church origins and current affiliations. The Association of Episcopal Colleges is a consortium of colleges with historic and present ties to the Episcopal Church which works to support many of these institutions through the Episcopal Church.

== Seminaries ==
Locations of Episcopal seminaries in the US
- Berkeley Divinity School at Yale Divinity School, New Haven, Connecticut
- Bexley Seabury Seminary (formerly Seabury-Western Theological Seminary) at Chicago Theological Seminary, Chicago, Illinois
- Church Divinity School of the Pacific, Berkeley, California
- Episcopal Divinity School, New York, New York (currently unaccredited and not granting degrees)
- General Theological Seminary, New York City / Alexandria, Virginia
- Nashotah House, Nashotah, Wisconsin
- School of Theology at The University of the South, Sewanee, Tennessee
- Seminary of the Southwest (formerly Episcopal Theological Seminary of the Southwest), Austin, Texas
- Virginia Theological Seminary, Alexandria, Virginia

== Colleges ==
Locations of Episcopal colleges in the US
- Bard College, Annandale-on-Hudson, New York
- Clarkson College, Omaha, Nebraska
- Hobart and William Smith Colleges, Geneva, New York
- Kenyon College, Gambier, Ohio
- St. Augustine's University, Raleigh, North Carolina (currently unaccredited and not awarding degrees)
- University of the South, Sewanee, Tennessee
- Voorhees University, Denmark, South Carolina

== Formerly affiliated ==
- Boise State University, Boise, Idaho (until 1938, now public)
- College of William & Mary, Williamsburg, Virginia (prior to 1786 with the passage of the Virginia Statute for Religious Freedom; state-supported since 1906)
- Columbia University, New York City (now a non-sectarian institution)
- Lehigh University, Bethlehem, Pennsylvania (prior to 1907)
- Shimer College, Chicago (1959 to 1973, now non-sectarian and a program at North Central College)
- St. Augustine College (until 2023, now a program at Lewis University)
- Trinity College, Hartford, Connecticut (until 1968)
- Trinity School for Ministry, Ambridge, Pennsylvania (until 2022, now affiliated solely with the Anglican Church in North America)

== Defunct ==
- Racine College, Racine, Wisconsin (Collegiate department from 1852-1889; School closed completely in 1933)
- St. Paul's College, Lawrenceville, Virginia (1888 to 2013)
