= Book of Common Prayer (1928, United States) =

Anglican liturgical book

The 1928 Book of Common Prayer (Note: The official full name of the text is The Book of Common Prayer; and Administration of the Sacraments and Other Rites and Ceremonies of the Church According to the use of The Protestant Episcopal Church Together with The Psalter or Psalms of David, following titling conventions extant from the initial period of prayer book production.) was the official primary liturgical book of the U.S.-based Episcopal Church from 1928 to 1979. An edition in the same tradition as other versions of the Book of Common Prayer used by the churches within the Anglican Communion and Anglicanism generally, it contains both the forms of the Eucharistic liturgy and the Daily Office, as well as additional public liturgies and personal devotions. It was the third major revision of the Book of Common Prayer adopted by the Episcopal Church, succeeding the 1892 edition and being replaced by the 1979 Book of Common Prayer.

== Background ==
Following the English Reformation and the separation of the Church of England from the Catholic Church, the liturgies of Anglicanism were transcribed into English. The first such production was the 1549 Book of Common Prayer, traditionally considered to be work of Thomas Cranmer, which replaced both the missals and breviaries of Catholic usage. Among these liturgies were the Communion service and canonical hours of Matins and Evensong, with the addition of the Ordinal containing the form for the consecration of bishops, priests, and deacons in 1550. Under Edward VI, the 1552 Book of Common Prayer incorporated more radically Protestant reforms, a process that continued with 1559 edition approved under Elizabeth I.

=== American prayer books ===
Prior to the consecration of Samuel Seabury by the Episcopal Church of Scotland as the first American Anglican bishop to not accept the English Crown and the establishment of the independent Episcopal Church after the American Revolutionary War, the Church of England had operated in what would become the United States using the liturgies as defined in the 1662 Book of Common Prayer. Pennsylvanian Episcopal priests William Smith and William White created the first widely used American edition of the prayer book in 1786 as a "proposed" text based on the 1662 prayer book. A further revision with a greater departure from the English 1662 edition was approved for regular usage by the newly-established Episcopal Church in 1789. Notably, the Eucharistic prayers of this approved edition included a similar Epiclesis invoking the Holy Spirit as that present in Eastern Christian rituals and the Episcopal Church of Scotland's liturgy. Proposals to remove the Nicene and Athanasian Creeds faced successful objections from both a caucus of High Church Virginians and English bishops who had been consulted on the prayer book's production. Revisions of the 1789 Book of Common Prayer, known as "Standard Editions", (Note: Not to be confused with the standard editions by which Episcopal prayer books are compared for certification, which are currently defined by Canon 3, Title II of the Constitutions and Canons of the Episcopal Church.) were promulgated by the General Convention in 1793, 1822, 1832, 1838, 1845, and 1871 with notes regarding changes.

The 1789 edition would be replaced in 1892 by a new edition of the prayer book considered a "conservative" revision of its predecessor. The 1892 Book of Common Prayer was the first American prayer book to have a standard edition made which further printings were to be compared against and inserted rubrical emphasis on offering Communion to all present. Among the alterations were several derived from edits in a draft liturgy produced by the Scottish Episcopal Church in 1889. While the 1892 prayer book was not a complete revision, it indicated that the prayer book was changeable.

== Revision and introduction ==
The pressure for additional revision after the adoption of the 1892 prayer book continued until the 1928 General Convention adopted the 1928 prayer book. This adoption came after a revision effort that began in 1913 with the creation of a commission following efforts by Clifon Macon in the Diocese of California during the preceding year. This commission—which included bishops, priests, and laymen—recommended several changes to the prayer book in their first report. These included alterations with doctrinal implications—such as the removal of a prayer that identified disastrous weather as divine punishment for sin—that were approved by the General Convention.

Under the leadership of Cortlandt Whitehead and, after his 1922 death, Charles L. Slattery, the commission presented book-length reports at four further General Conventions, resulting in review and debate with varying outcomes. At the 1922 General Convention, the conservative view on revision dissipated; the revision process was completed at the 1925 convention. Final approval came in 1928.

Among the significant changes present in the 1928 prayer book included the excision of "extreme Calvinism", diminished emphasis on human sinfulness, and alteration of the matrimonial service such that the pledges were more similar between husband and wife. The 1928 prayer book began a general shift from the medieval patterns of the Visitation of the Sick, which had generally interpreted sickness as both incurable and as punishment, but the new prayer book did not entirely omit these earlier prayers. The third Good Friday collect was altered to omit what was deemed an "unwarranted slur" against Jews that had been present since the 1549 prayer book.

== Use and replacement ==
=== Post-1979 usage ===
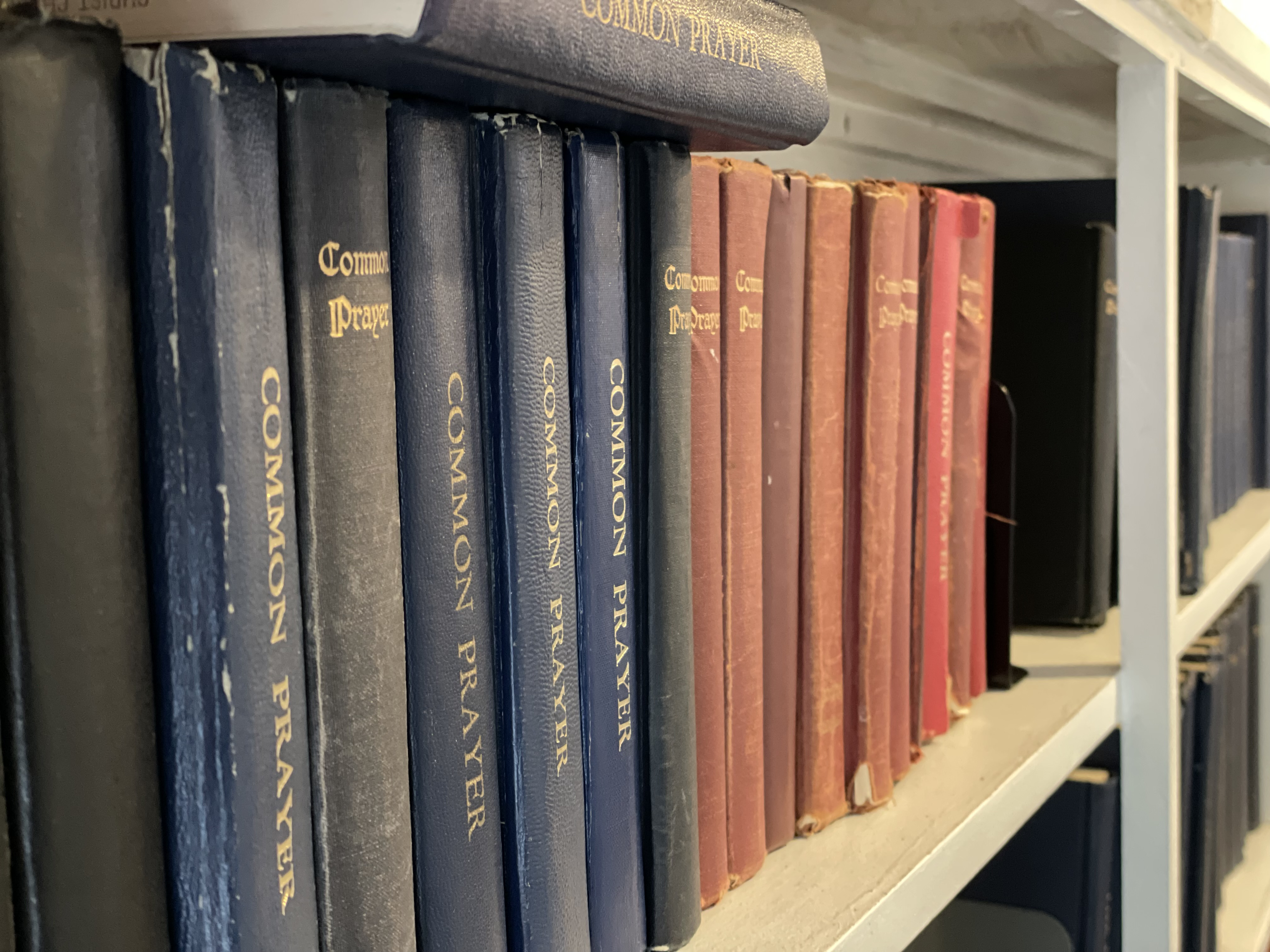
Copies of the 1928 prayer book inside an Anglican Catholic Church parish

The Episcopal Church authorized bishops to permit 1928 prayer book liturgies to be celebrated within their dioceses at the same 1979 General Convention that approved the 1979 prayer book. Usage under this provision required celebration according to the 1979 lectionary. The 2000 General Convention revised these permissions, assigning the 1928 prayer book to the same category of permissions given to supplemental liturgies approved post-1979. In 1991, the Church of the Good Shepherd, an anglo-catholic Episcopal Church parish in Rosemont, Pennsylvania, published the Anglican Service Book as a "traditional language adaptation of the 1979 Book of Common Prayer." Besides offering the Rite I services of the 1979 prayer book, it offered traditional-language versions of the 1979 prayer book's contemporary-language prayers. The Psalter is that of the 1928 prayer book.

== Contents ==
The 1928 prayer book is organized with the Daily Offices, including Morning and Evening Prayer, towards the front. The middle section of the book contains the Order for the Holy Communion with associated collects and Scriptural readings. The rear of the text is devoted to the Occasional Offices, including those baptism, matrimony, and burial. Like other Books of Common Prayer and the King James Bible, the 1928 prayer book does not capitalize pronouns when referring to God. Massey H. Shepherd–who played a significant role in creating the 1979 prayer book–said that the Thirty-nine Articles as they appear in the 1928 prayer book "should be interpreted in light of the teaching of the entire Prayer Book. They are not a norm by which the rest of the Prayer Book must of necessity be judged and explained."

=== Daily Office ===
The penitential sentences prefacing the 1892 prayer book's Daily Offices were deleted in favor for seasonal emphasis. However, despite the popularity of the practice, rubrics for sermons were not inserted into the 1928 prayer book's Daily Offices, keeping with the 1892 and other earlier prayer books.

The pattern for reading Scriptural lessons in the 1928 prayer book deviates significantly from Cranmer's lectionary, favoring weekday lessons to be read "in course". This arrangement sees books of the Bible read from beginning to end with some omissions. The 1928 prayer book's lessons were also designed to be relevant to the seasons of the liturgical calendar.

On October 5, 1943 a new daily lectionary was approved for use in the Daily Office. It provided for alternate psalms in the daily readings.

=== Holy Communion ===
The 1928 prayer book contains the form of the Holy Communion service–titled the Order for the Administration of the Lord's Supper or the Holy Communion–before the collects, epistles, and gospels. A new rubric was inserted with the 1928 prayer book which permitted a deacon to celebrate the Communion office ending at the gospel when a priest was absent. As in other prior English prayer books, the 1928 prayer book includes a rubric permitting sermons during the celebration of the Eucharist.

Due to growing opposition to the Ten Commandments in the Communion service on the grounds that they had lost their relevancy and meaning in the modern world, permission was granted that significant portions might be omitted. The portions authorized for omission were printed inset from the rest of the commandments. The revising commission had unsuccessfully proposed that they be followed by "A new commandment I give unto you, that ye also love one another; as I have loved you, that ye also one another."

Unlike other English and American prayer book revisions which had introduced few new collects, the 1928 edition added 15 across various offices including the Holy Communion. Despite there only being one formal fixed Postcommunion thanksgiving, changes between the 1550 ordinal and the 1552 prayer book resulted in a longstanding tradition wherein the Commendatory Prayers were treated as "Postcommunions"; this tradition was formally authorized in the 1928 proposed English prayer book and 1929 Scottish Prayer Book while a rubric in the 1928 American prayer book failed to completely prevent the practice.

The 1789 prayer book permitted a "hymn" after the Consecration, with the 1928 prayer book placing this after the Prayer of Humble Access and during the Breaking of Bread and the Communion. Despite the 1928 proposal to restore the Agnus Dei narrowly failing, the view of the Agnus Dei as a "hymn" allowed its singing.

=== Occasional Offices ===
Among the offices included within the 1928 prayer book are those for baptism, confirmation, marriage, illness, and burial. The burial office introduced a new collect that asks for a growth of both knowledge and love of God; this prayer was retained in the 1979 prayer book's Rite I form. The 1928 prayer book also introduced several prayers for the dead. This type of prayer—which had been absent since the 1552 prayer book—was inserted in the context of the post–World War I world, where memory of the dead was part of the public consciousness.

The Visitation of the Sick was significantly altered from its 1892 guise with the intent of removing "so gloomy, so medieval" theology that had prevented its regular use in ministry. The new office was intended to impart hope on the sick, with joyful psalms introduced. Abbreviated forms of the confession and absolution were similarly added.
