= Berkeley Divinity School at Yale =

Seminary of the Episcopal Church in Connecticut, U.S.

Coordinates: 41.3232°N 72.9233°W

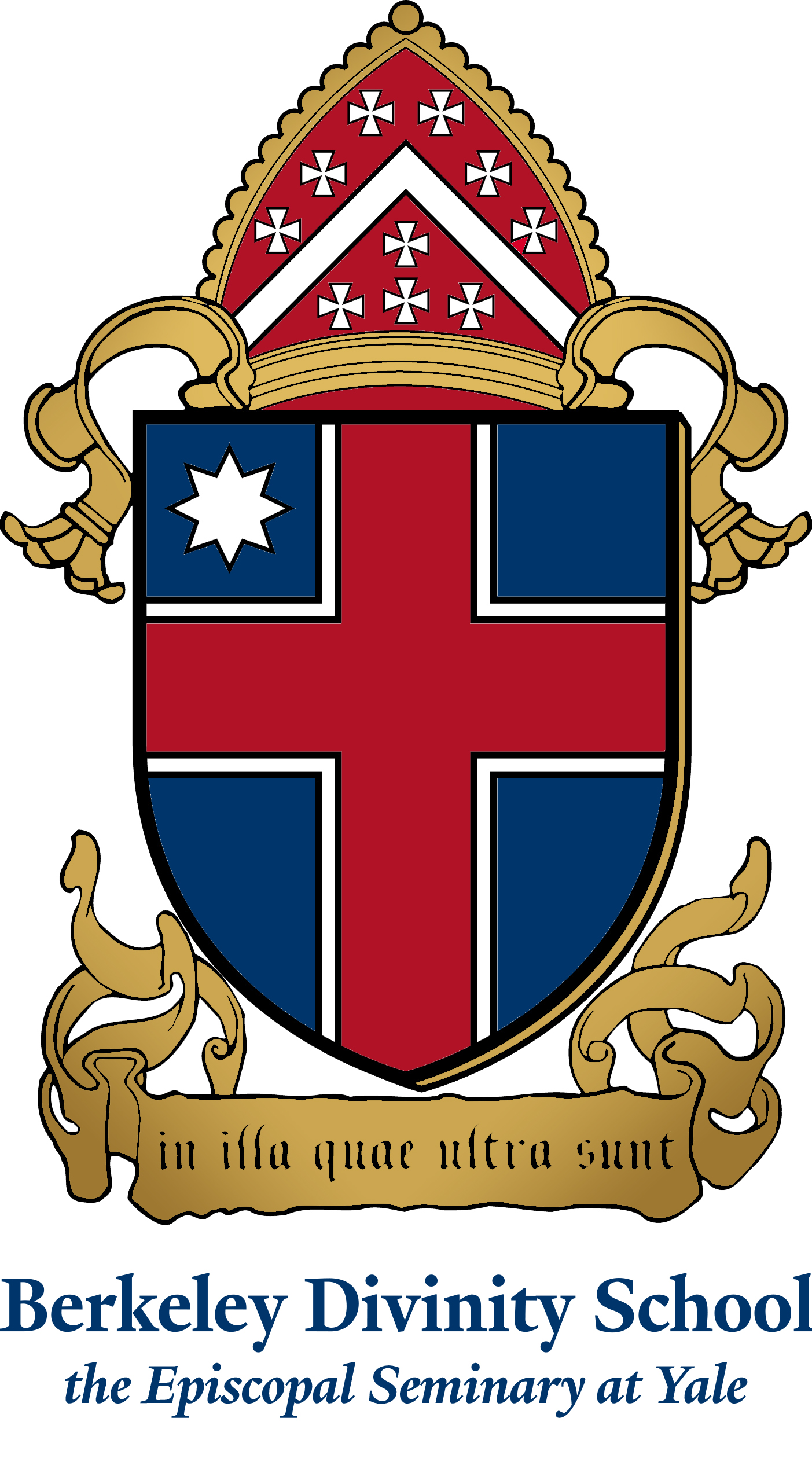
- Coat of arms of the school
- Motto: In illa quae ultra sunt
- Motto in English: Into regions beyond (2 Corinthians 10:16)
- Type: Seminary
- Established: 1854
- Founder: John Williams
- Religious affiliation: Episcopal Church
- Academic affiliations: Yale University
- Dean: The Very Rev. Dr. Gabrielle Thomas
- Location: New Haven, Connecticut, U.S.
- Language: English
- Website: berkeleydivinity.yale.edu

Berkeley Divinity School at Yale, founded in 1854, is a seminary of The Episcopal Church in New Haven, Connecticut. Along with Andover Newton Theological School and the Yale Institute of Sacred Music, Berkeley is one of the three "Partners on the Quad," which are part of Yale Divinity School at Yale University. Thus, Berkeley operates as a denominational seminary within an ecumenical divinity school. Berkeley has historically represented a Broad church orientation among Anglican seminaries in the country, and was the fourth independent seminary to be founded, after General Theological Seminary (1817), Virginia Theological Seminary (1823), and Nashotah House (1842). Berkeley's institutional antecedents began at Trinity College, Hartford in 1849. The institution was formally chartered in Middletown, Connecticut in 1854, moved to New Haven in 1928, and amalgamated with Yale in 1971.

Berkeley's offices and programs are centered with those of Yale Divinity School on the Sterling Divinity Quadrangle, although Berkeley also maintains a separate center for worship and some programs at the nearby Berkeley Center on St. Ronan Street.

== History ==
=== Antecedents ===
Prior to the American Revolution, the Church of England in America existed under the episcopal oversight of the Bishop of London. There were no American bishops and ecclesial authority was exercised by “Commissaries” such as the Rev. James Blair. While American ordinands had to travel to England to be ordained, many of them were able to train for the ministry in the Colonies. As Harvard was Congregationalist, Anglican training largely occurred privately or at the College of William & Mary (from 1693) and later also at Yale College (from 1701).

In 1754, the Rev. Samuel Johnson founded the King's College, New York (now Columbia University) as an Anglican institution, in part to prepare men for the ministry. Johnson had been a close friend of the English priest, philosopher, and missionary George Berkeley and had induced him to donate his farm and library to Yale in 1731.

In 1794, Connecticut churchmen founded the Episcopal Academy at Cheshire in the hope of later elevating it to collegiate status, though this did not come to fruition. Instead, the General Theological Seminary in New York, founded in 1820, served as the principal center of theological study in the Northeast.

=== Foundation and Middletown years: 1849–1928 ===
Berkeley Divinity School began as the theology department of Trinity College, Hartford, an Episcopal school which was founded by the Rt. Rev. Thomas Church Brownell in 1823. In 1849, the Rev. John Williams, then President of Trinity, organized the department with the Rev. Thomas Winthrop Coit as professor of Church History. Among the first class of assisting faculty were the Rev. Abner Jackson, as well as the Rev. Thomas M. Clark, and the Rev. Arthur Cleveland Coxe, both of whom later became bishops.

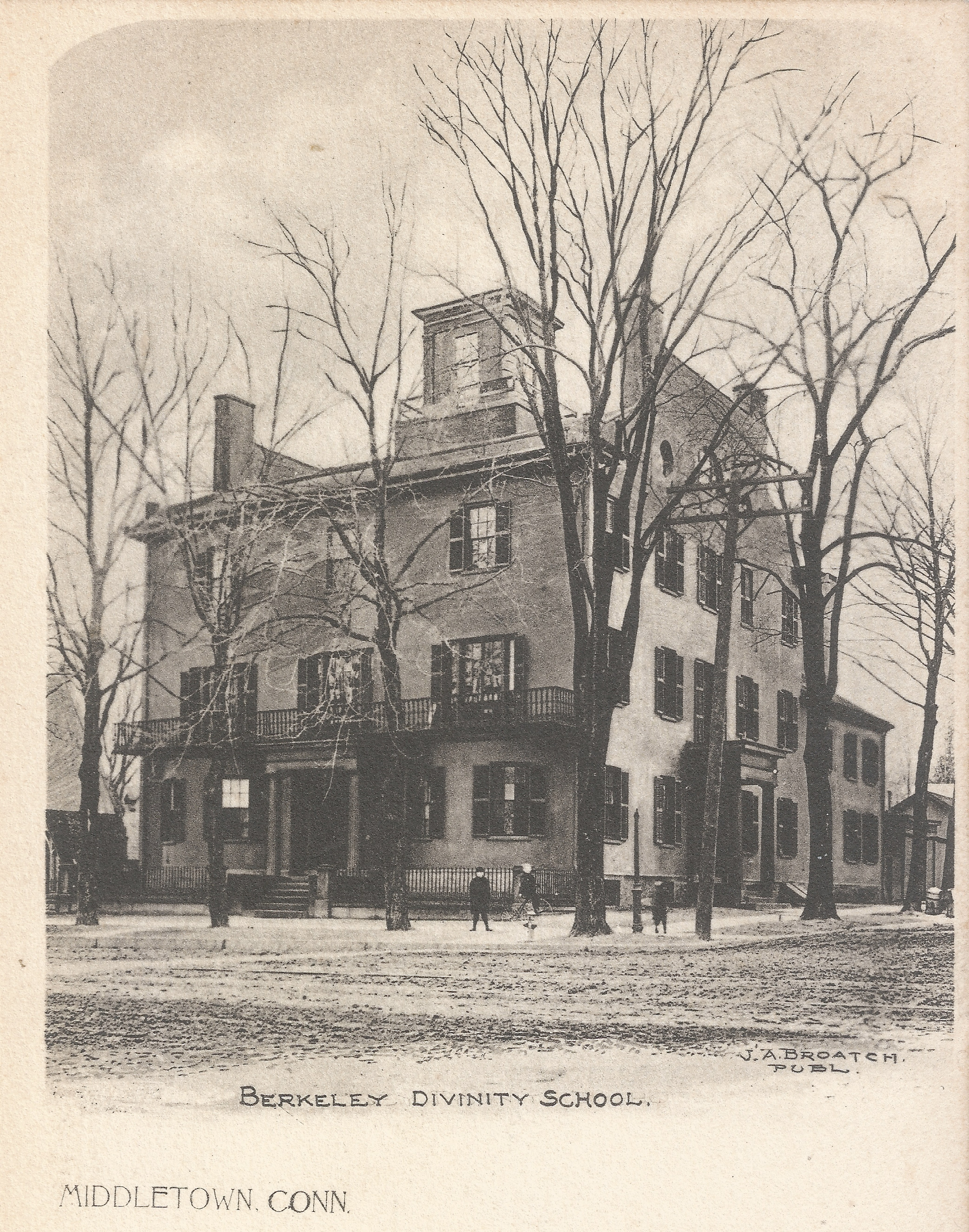
Jarvis House, Berkeley Divinity School, Middletown CT

Instead of remaining within the college (like the departments at Kenyon College and Sewanee: The University of the South), the fledgling divinity school moved to Middletown, Connecticut in 1853 after Williams, now Assistant Bishop of Connecticut, resigned his college presidency to focus on his diocesan work. Gifts from Edward S. Hall ($20,000) and the Rev. William Jarvis ($10,000, including his former house) permitted the growth of the seminary at Middletown. Berkeley was formally incorporated on 3 May 1854. The remaining students who were mid-course at Trinity were transferred to Middletown in 1854, and by 1859 the seminary was teaching nineteen students. The seminary was intended to act as a mediating alternative between the Anglo-Catholic–leaning General Theological Seminary in New York and the evangelical-leaning Virginia Theological Seminary. The name of the seminary alludes to the vision of philosopher and Bishop George Berkeley, who a century earlier had planned a seminary in the western hemisphere; this use of his name for an educational institution precedes its association with California by some decades.

The Middletown campus consisted of two houses adjacent to the Church of the Holy Trinity, with several buildings and extra wings being added over the next half century. Holy Trinity acted as the functional pro-cathedral of the Diocese and for the first six years students worshipped there. In 1860 Mary W. Mütter (née Alsop) endowed a chapel in memory of her late husband Dr. Thomas Dent Mütter. On the Feast of the Epiphany, 1861 the first Chapel of St. Luke the Physician opened to public worship. It was consecrated by Williams on 16 March 1861. The chapel was designed “in the decorated style of Gothic architecture,” in collegiate seating with 62 stalls and a five-sided apse.

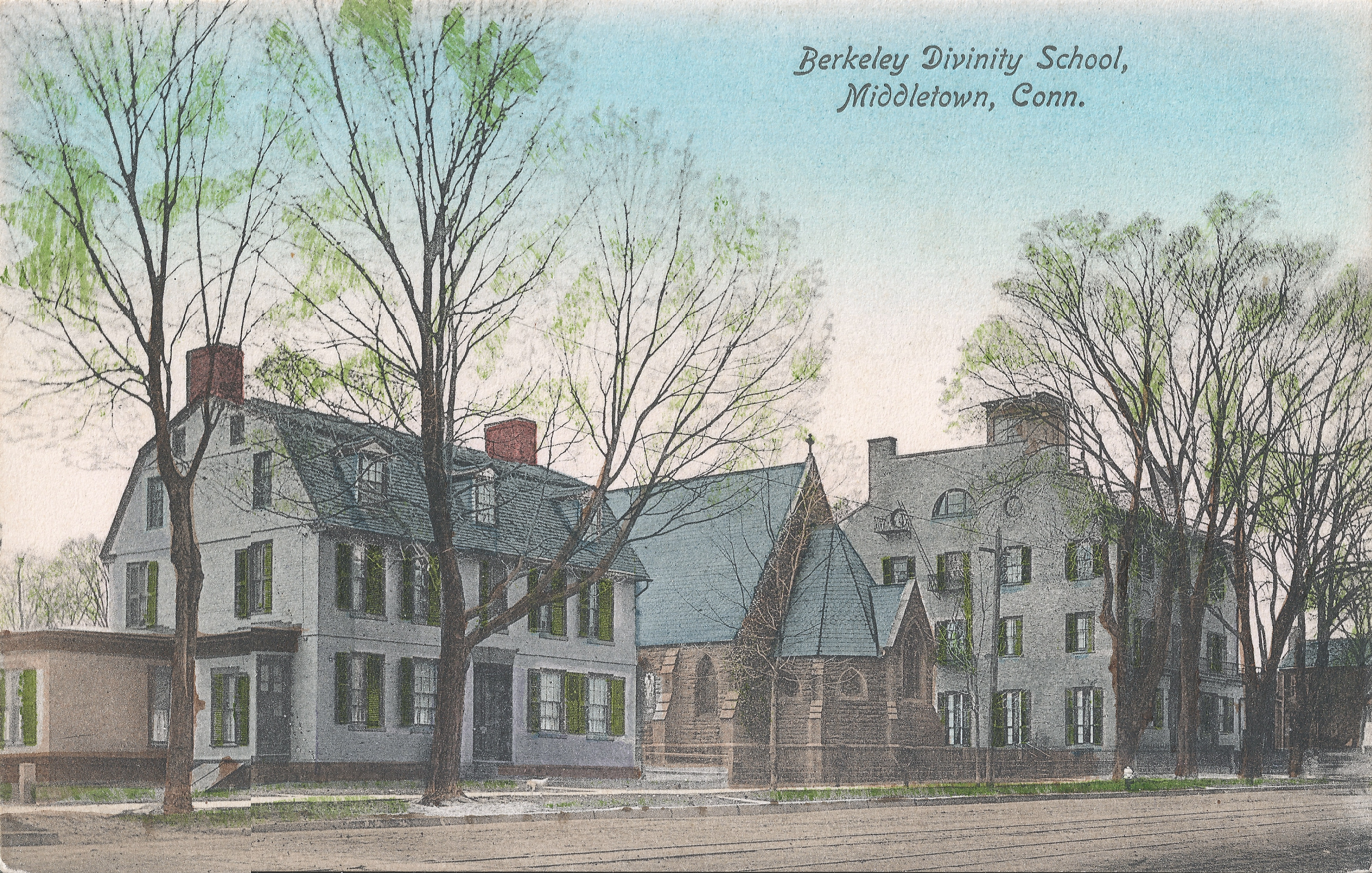
Chapel of St. Luke, Berkeley Divinity School, Middletown CT

In this early period, the seminary was functionally part of the private household of the Bishop, operating in a similar manner to Cuddesdon College founded by Bishop Samuel Wilberforce in Oxford in the same year. During the Williams tenure, seminarians lived, worshipped, and studied alongside their dean and professors. Students were expected at Morning and Evening Prayer five days a week with––unusually for that period––Eucharist every Sunday. At first, these services were celebrated in the church, but were later transferred to the chapel. By 1904, a Thursday Eucharist was added. The seminary also developed a series of academic and ecclesial affiliations, including one with Wesleyan College, allowing students in both institutions access to lectures in the other.

Williams continued as dean while succeeding as Diocesan Bishop (and Presiding Bishop from 1887) until his death in 1899. The number of students reached its low ebb in the period directly after Williams's death and by 1902, there were only seven students enrolled in the seminary. On the eve of American entrance into the First World War, there were further blows to the school. Professor Hervey Vanderbogart died suddenly in his 40s and Dean Samuel Hart died a month later. It was into this context that the Rev. William Palmer Ladd was suddenly thrust as the new dean.

William Palmer Ladd, who had arrived at Berkeley as a professor in 1916 was formally inaugurated as dean on the Feast of St. Simon and St. Jude, on 28 October 1918. Ladd was a noted liturgical scholar, and like many of his English colleagues––including the visiting professor, priest, and author, Percy Dearmer––was a committed Christian socialist. In 1919, at the immediate conclusion of the war, a guest lecture on Russia sparked a small scandal with accusations of “Bolshevism at Berkeley.” Though Ladd was ultimately vindicated, the incident resulted in permanent tensions with certain members of the Board.

=== New Haven years: 1928–1971 ===
Ladd remained committed to Social Gospel movements throughout his tenure and also expanded public access to seminary education, inaugurating a Summer School of Theology for Women from 1923 to 1925. After many years of discussion about potential moves or mergers, Ladd transferred Berkeley to New Haven in 1928 to take advantage of the resources of Yale University. The impossibility of immediately selling the Middletown campus, as well as the Great Depression caused another prolonged period of financial instability from 1929 to 1935. Eventually, these were overcome and Berkeley moved into Sachem Hall (renamed Brewster Hall for The Rt. Rev. Chauncey B. Brewster) at the corner of Prospect and Sachem street in 1940.

After Ladd's death in 1941, he was succeeded by Prof. Charles Baker Hedrick as Acting Dean and then by the Rev. Lawrence Rose from Central Theological College, Tokyo. Rose himself had been expelled from Japan along with many other Christian missionaries in 1940. Rose left in 1947 after being elected dean of General, and was succeeded by the Rev. Percy Linwood Urban Sr., who had begun as Berkeley's professor of systematic theology in 1941. In the late 1940s and early 1950s under Urban's deanship, Berkeley grew significantly, buying and renovating a number of buildings off Prospect Street. Students also moved from their long-temporary chapel in the attic of a former barn (“the upper room”) to a purpose-built chapel with 78 student and 11 faculty stalls. The Rev. Richard Hooker Wilmer Jr., previously the Episcopal Chaplain at Sewanee and then Yale, succeeded Urban in 1957. Over the course of the 1960s, however, the seminary began to once again experience financial hardship.

=== Yale years: 1971–present ===
In 1971, as the Episcopal Church sought to reduce the number of seminaries, the Very Rev. Michael Allen was appointed dean to seek a solution to Berkeley's financial challenges. A new agreement between Yale and Berkeley resulted in a closer affiliation, rather than amalgamation with another Episcopalian institution; since then all students of Berkeley Divinity School have also been students of Yale Divinity School and take a Yale degree. As a consequence of this merger, Berkeley sold its campus on Sachem Street to Yale and purchased a converted Edwardian mansion on St. Ronan Street to house the Deanery, chapel, offices, classrooms, and a few student apartments. Its former campus was demolished between 2009 and 2012 to make room for two new residential colleges including Pauli Murray College, named for the Episcopal priest and activist.

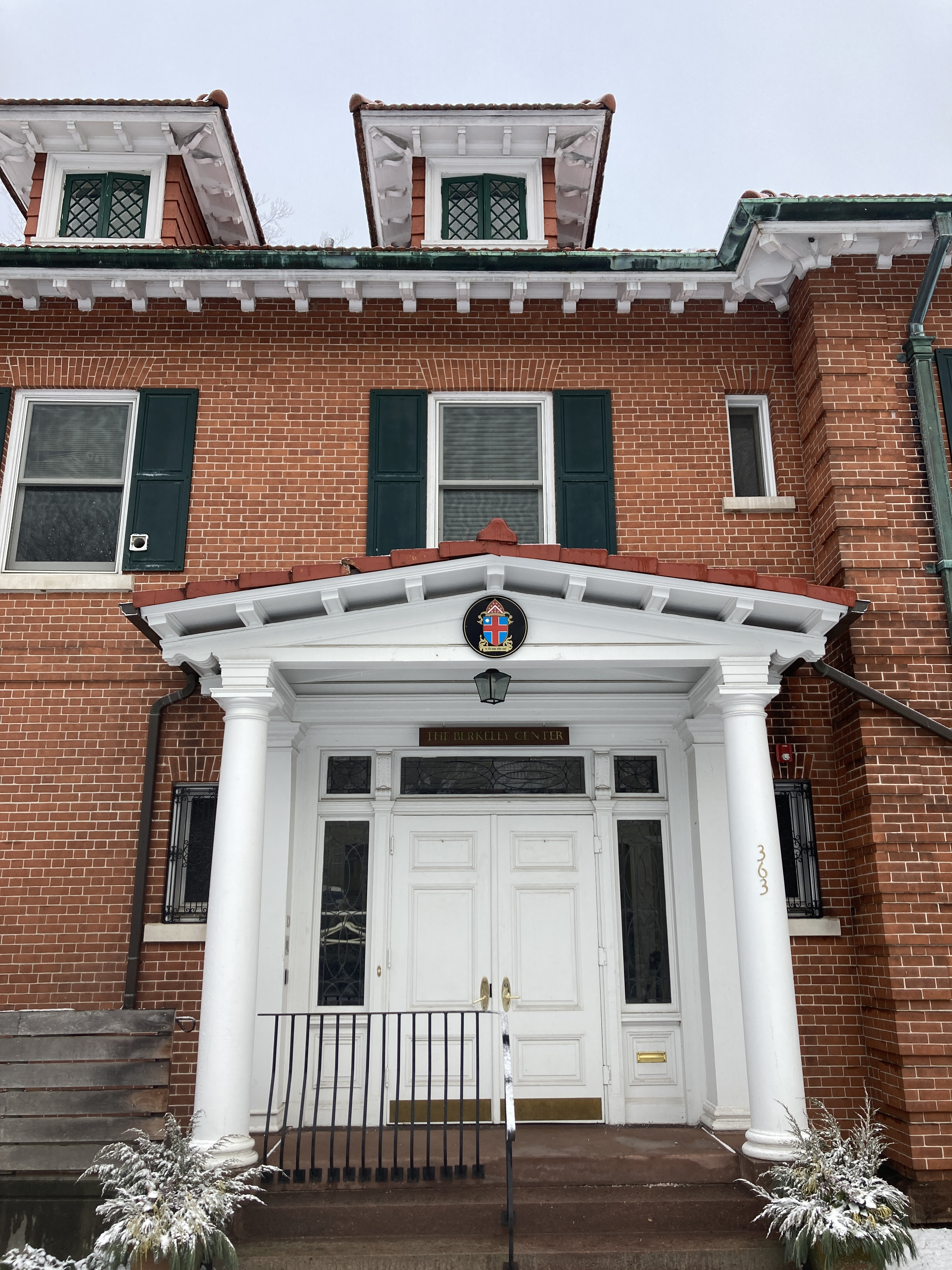
Detail of the main entrance, The Berkeley Center, St. Ronan Street

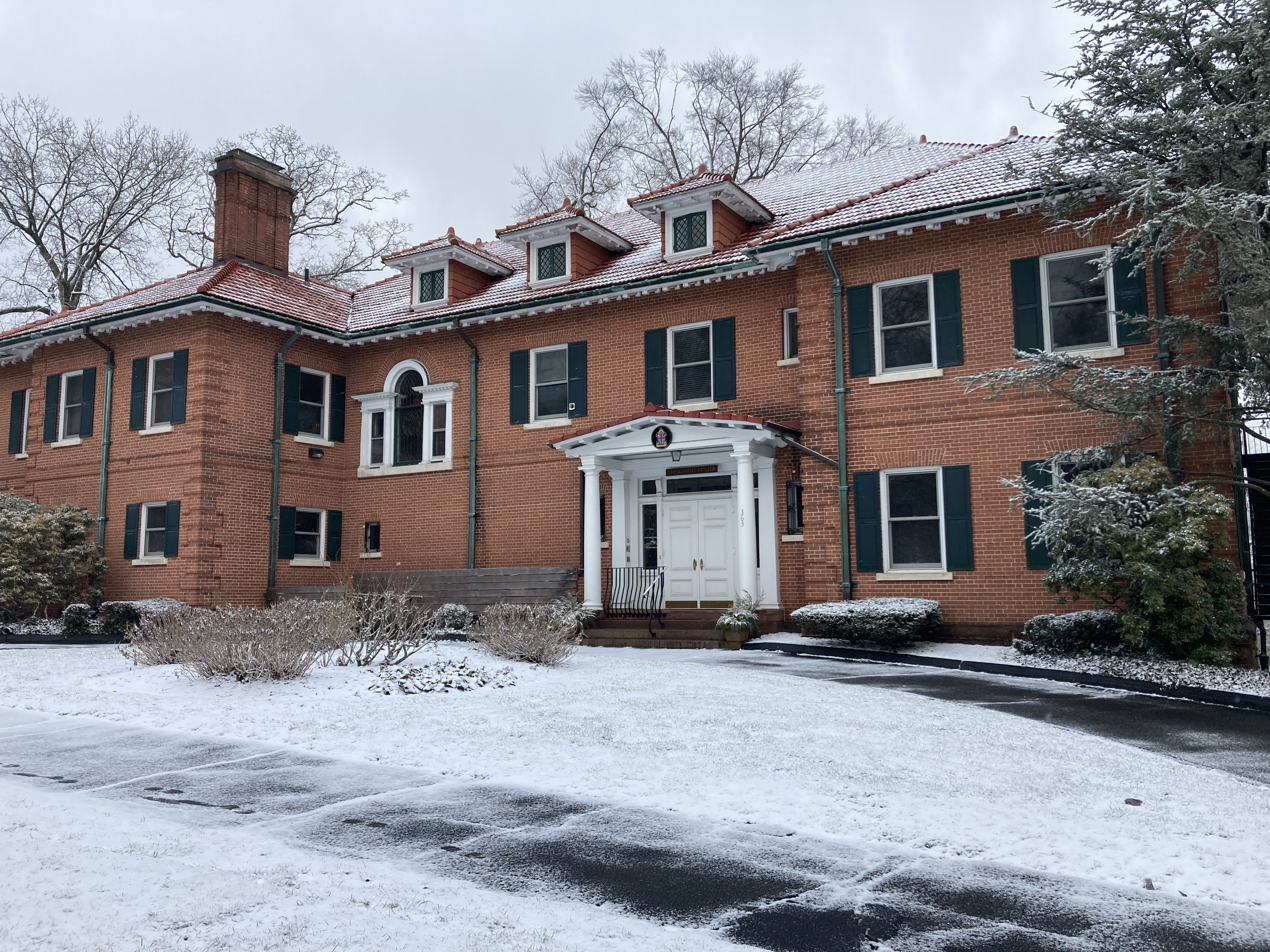
The Berkeley Center, St. Ronan Street

Allen was succeeded by the brief tenure of the Very Rev. Charles Halsey Clark (1977–1982), and then The Very Rev. James E. Annand (1982–1991), after whom the "Annand Program for Spiritual Formation" is named. After the seven-year tenure of the Very Rev. Philip W. Turner III, Berkeley elected R. William Franklin to the deanship, to date the only lay person to be dean of the seminary (he would later be ordained). Franklin was the subject of some controversy in 2001 when he was alleged to have misappropriated some $10,000 in charitable funds. Franklin resigned, and a formal audit verified personal expenditures “not consistent with the dean’s employment agreement.” The incident resulted in some tension between Berkeley and Yale University, which apparently rescinded permission to build a new chapel on the main Divinity School campus. It also resulted in a subsequent lawsuit, lodged against the seminary by its former finance director.

Over the course of his decade-long tenure, the Very Rev. Joseph H. Britton substantially stabilized relationships with Yale Divinity School and the university, and undertook a series of new initiatives including urban ministries and international exchanges. Britton was succeeded by the Very Rev. Andrew McGowan in 2014. In 2026, following McGowan's retirement, the Very Rev. Dr. Gabrielle Thomas was appointed to the position of dean. A former faculty member of Yale Divinity School, Thomas taught at Emory's Candler School of Theology for several years before returning to Berkeley.

== Programs of study ==
As part of the terms of its amalgamation with Yale University in 1971, Berkeley agreed not to confer earned degrees, such as the Master of Divinity (M.Div) or Master of Arts in Religion (M.A.R.). However, because it remains an institution chartered with a degree-granting power, it continues to offer honorary degrees, such as the Doctor of Divinity. All students at Berkeley are concurrently students at Yale Divinity School from which they take coursework for their M.Div, M.A.R., or S.T.M. degree. Berkeley offers two courses of study, a Diploma in Anglican Studies for M.Div candidates and a Certificate in Anglican Studies for M.A.R. and S.T.M. students. These are conferred in addition to the degree proper from Yale Divinity School. Approximately one third of Yale Divinity School's students undertaking the master's degree in divinity are members of Berkeley.

Like all seminaries within The Episcopal Church, Berkeley requires and helps to coordinate Clinical Pastoral Education (CPE) and Supervised Ministry Internships for all of its Master of Divinity candidates who are preparing for ordination.

== Worship ==
Daily corporate worship at Berkeley occurs in the Chapel of St. Luke in the Berkeley Center on St. Ronan Street. This is officially the fourth Chapel of St. Luke (the previous ones being in Middletown, and two iterations on Sachem Street in New Haven). Worship generally conforms to the 1979 Book of Common Prayer, the Book of Common Prayer of the Episcopal Church. Worship alternates between Rite I (traditional language), Rite II (modern language), and the "Berkeley Office." Berkeley has had a long history of liturgical development which began during the incumbency of the Very Rev. William Palmer Ladd, dean and liturgist, who authored the Prayer Book Interleaves in 1941.

In term-time, Morning Prayer and Holy Eucharist are celebrated Monday through Friday at 7:30 a.m. Evening Prayer is read on Monday and Thursdays (5:30 p.m. and 5:45 p.m., respectively). An evening "Community Eucharist" is celebrated Wednesdays at 6:00 p.m. in Yale Divinity School's Marquand Chapel with the Berkeley Chapel Choir.

== Deans ==
- 1854–1899: The Most Rev. John Williams
- 1899–1908: The Very Rev. John Binney
- 1908–1917: The Very Rev. Dr. Samuel Hart
- 1917–1941: The Very Rev. William Palmer Ladd
- 1942–1947: The Very Rev. Lawrence Rose
- 1947–1957: The Very Rev. Dr. Percy Linwood Urban Sr.
- 1957–1969: The Very Rev. Dr. Richard Hooker Wilmer Jr.
- 1970–1976: The Very Rev. J. C. Michael Allen
- 1977–1982: The Very Rev. Charles Halsey ("Kelly") Clark
- 1982–1991: The Very Rev. James E. Annand
- 1991–1998: The Very Rev. Dr. Philip W. Turner III
- 1998–2001: Dr. Ralph William Franklin
- 2003–2014: The Very Rev. Dr. Joseph H. Britton
- 2014–2026: The Very Rev. Dr. Andrew McGowan
- 2026-Present: The Very Rev. Dr. Gabrielle Thomas

== Notable alumni ==
- The Rt. Rev. Charles Minnigerode Beckwith, fourth Bishop of Alabama
- The Rev. Barbara Brown Taylor, Episcopal priest, preacher, and theologian
- The Rev. Robert W. Castle (1929–2012), Episcopal priest, activist and actor (Philadelphia, Beloved, Rachel Getting Married).
- The Most. Rev. Michael Curry, (born 1953), Presiding Bishop of The Episcopal Church
- The Rev. Charles Fulton (born 1938), Episcopal priest, revivalist
- The Rt. Rev. Alfred Harding (1852–1923), second Bishop of Washington
- The Rt. Rev. Frederick Joseph Kinsman (1868-1944), third Bishop of Delaware, subsequently converted to Roman Catholicism
- The Rev. George E. Lounsbury (1838-1904), Governor of Connecticut
- The Right Rev. Edward Harding MacBurney, Episcopal Bishop of Quincy
- The Rt. Rev. Victoria Matthews (born 1954), Bishop of Edmonton and of Christchurch
- The Rev. Dr. Leonel Mitchell (1930-2012), Episcopal priest, liturgist
- The Rt. Rev. William Woodruff Niles (1832-1914), third Bishop of New Hampshire
- The Rev. Henry Harrison Oberly, Episcopal priest, liturgist
- The Rt. Rev. Sidney Catlin Partridge (1857-1930), Bishop of Kyoto, second Bishop of West Missouri
- The Rev. Harry Boone Porter (1923–1999), Episcopal priest, liturgist, journalist, and environmentalist
- The Rev. Dr. Robert W. Prichard, Episcopal priest, church historian
- The Rt. Rev. Walter Righter (1923–2011), seventh Bishop of Iowa
- The Rt. Rev. Calvin Schofield Jr. (born 1933), Bishop of Southeast Florida
- The Rev. Dr. Massey H. Shepherd, Episcopal priest, liturgist, architect of the Book of Common Prayer (1979)
- The Rt. Rev. Kirk Stevan Smith, fifth Bishop of Arizona
- The Rt. Rev. Elisha Smith Thomas, second Bishop of Kansas
- The Rev. William H. Vibbert, priest and Hebrew scholar
- The Rt. Rev. Lemuel H. Wells (1841–1936), first Bishop of Spokane
- The Rev. Henry S. Whitehead (1882–1932), Episcopal priest, author of horror fiction and fantasy
- The Rev. Robert Shaw Sturgis Whitman (1915–2010), Episcopal priest, author
