= List of presidents of Transylvania University =

The President of Transylvania University is the headmaster of the oldest university in Kentucky, founded in 1780, making it the 16th oldest university in the United States. The President is appointed by the board of trustees. The President oversees both administrative and academic standards of the university, and is responsible for facilitating student life and achievement.

== List of presidents ==
1. Harry Toulmin (1794–1796)
2. James Moore (1796–1804)
3. Horace Holley (1818–1827)
4. Alva Woods (1828–1831)
5. Thomas Winthrop Coit (1835–1837)
6. Robert Davidson (1840–1842)
7. Henry Bidleman Bascom (1842–1849)
8. Lewis W. Green (1856–1858)
9. Abraham Drake (1858–1861)
10. James Kennedy Patterson (1861–1865)
11. John Bryan Bowman (1865–1878)
12. Henry Hall White (1878–1880)
13. Charles Loos (1880–1897)
14. Reuben Cave (1897–1900)
15. Burris Jenkins (1901–1906)
16. Richard Crossfield (1908–1921)
17. Andrew Harmon (1922–1928)
18. Arthur Braden (1930–1938)
19. Raymond F. McLain (1939–1951)
20. Frank Rose (1951–1957)
21. Irvin Lunger (1957–1976)
22. William W. Kelly (1976–1981)
23. David G. Brown (1982–1983)
24. Charles L. Shearer (1983–2010)
25. R. Owen Williams (2010–2014)
26. Seamus Carey (2014–2019)
27. John Norton Williams (2019–2020)
28. Brien Lewis (2020–present)
