= Thomas Winthrop Coit =

Minister, author and educator (1803–1885)

Thomas Winthrop Coit (June 28, 1803 – June 21, 1885) was an American Episcopal minister, author, and educator. He was the fifth President of Transylvania University.

Coit, elder son of Thomas Coit, M.D., and Mary W. (Saltonstall) Coit, of New London, Connecticut, was born in that city, June 28, 1803.

He graduated from Yale College in 1821. While in college he intended to follow his father's profession, but in 1823 he began the study of theology in Andover Seminary. In 1824 he removed to Princeton Seminary, but remained only a few months. He was ordained deacon in the Protestant Episcopal Church by Bishop Thomas Church Brownell, June 7, 1826, at Newtown, Connecticut. His first parochial charge was as Rector (1827–29) of St. Peter's Church, Salem, Massachusetts, where he was advanced to the priesthood by Bishop Alexander Viets Griswold, November 15, 1827. He was next Rector of Christ's Church, Cambridge, Massachusetts, from Easter, 1829, to Easter, 1835. In 1831 an Episcopal Theological School was begun in Cambridge, and Coit was made Professor of Biblical Learning; this position he held (in connection with his rectorship) until he became in 1835 the President of Transylvania University, Lexington, Kentucky, and Morrison Professor of Metaphysics and Moral Philosophy. He published in 1834 a duodecimo edition of the Bible, arranged in paragraphs and parallelisms, with annotations, which was republished in England; in the same year he received the degree of Doctor of Divinity from Columbia College, that of Doctor of Laws was conferred by Trinity College in 1853.

He resigned the office of President in 1837, and was for two years Rector of Trinity Church, Brooklyn, N. Y. In May, 1839, he became the Rector of Trinity Church, New Rochelle, New York, where he continued for ten years. While thus occupied he published a vigorous polemic, entitled Puritanism (New York, 1845, pp. 528, 12mo). He also prepared in 1844 a valuable report on the Standard Edition of the Prayer-Book, under appointment of the General Convention. In 1849 he accepted the appointment of Professor of Ecclesiastical History in Trinity College and for the next five years resided in Hartford. In May, 1854, he went to Troy, N Y, as Rector of St Paul's Church; and about the same time the Berkeley Divinity School (an outgrowth from Trinity College) was established at Middletown, Conn., in which Dr. Coit continued to give instruction in the department which he had previously held in the college. He resigned the charge of a parish in 1872, and in February, 1873, became a resident professor in the Berkeley Divinity School, where he continued until his death there, from Blight's disease, June 21, 1885, at the age of 82.

Besides the works mentioned, his publications include a volume of Lectures on the Early History of Christianity in England, with sermons (New York, 1860, pp 334, 12mo).

He married, January 30, 1828, Eleanor Forrester Carlisle, of Salem, by whom he had three sons, of whom the two younger survived him.
