= Samuel Hart (priest) =

American Episcopal priest (1845–1917)

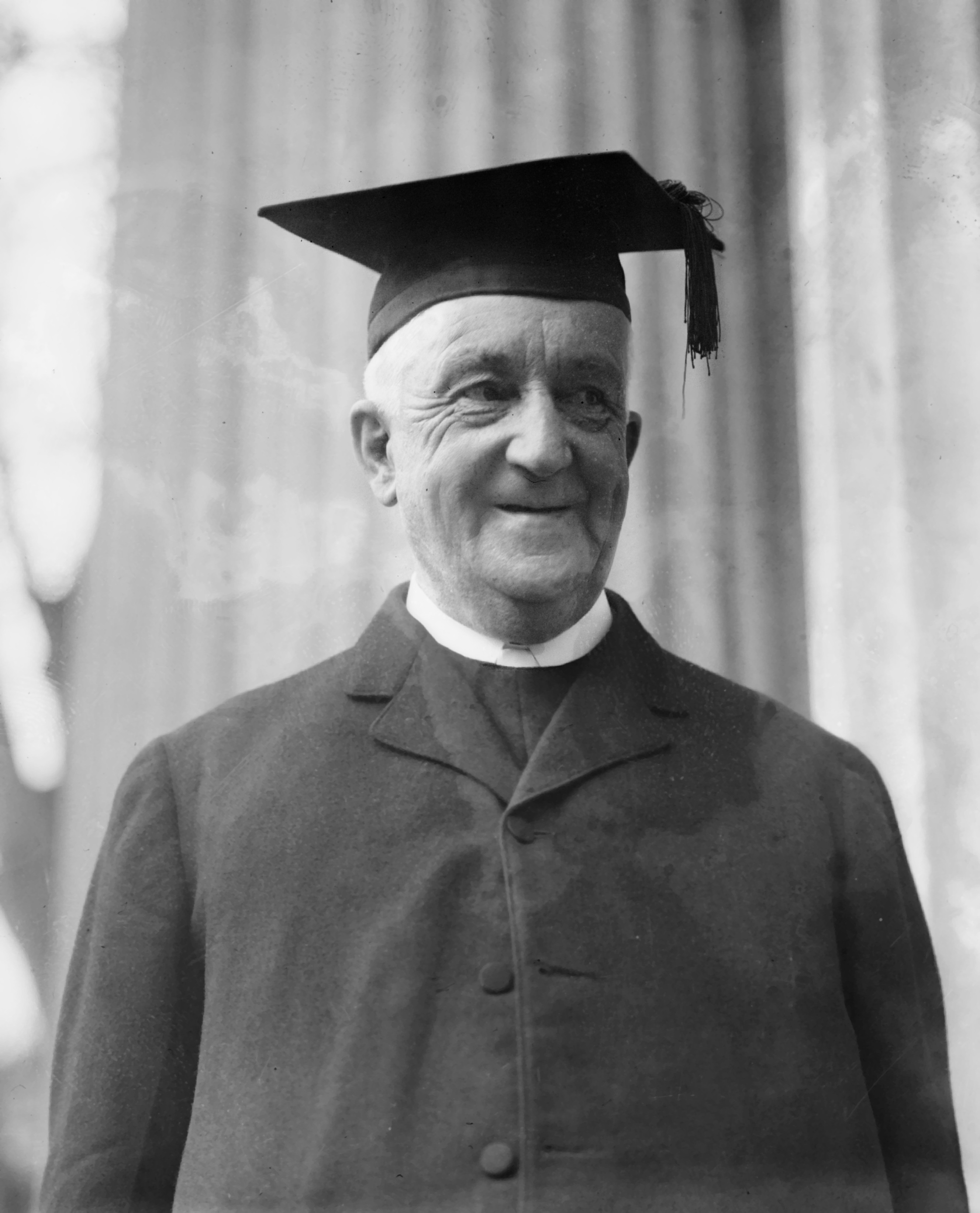
- Samuel Hart
- Born: June 4, 1845; Old Saybrook, Connecticut, U.S.
- Died: February 25, 1917 (aged 71); Middletown, Connecticut, U.S.
- Education: Trinity College
- Occupations: Episcopal clergyman, classicist, liturgical scholar
- Known for: Custodian of the Standard Prayer-Book; Dean of Berkeley Divinity School

Samuel Hart (1845–1917) was an American Episcopal clergyman, classicist, and liturgical scholar.

== Biography ==
Samuel Hart was born at Old Saybrook, Connecticut on June 4, 1845. He graduated from Trinity College in 1866, after 1868 taught at that institution, and was made professor of Latin in 1883. He had been ordained priest in 1870, and in 1893 he was elected Bishop of Vermont, but declined the office. In 1886, he became custodian of the Standard Prayer-Book of his church, and in 1892 secretary of the House of Bishops. In 1899 he became vice dean and professor of doctrinal theology and the Prayer-Book, and in 1908 dean, at the Berkeley Divinity School, then in Middletown, Connecticut. He was elected president of the American Philological Association in 1891.

He died on February 25, 1917, in Middletown, Connecticut..

== Publications ==
He published editions of Juvenal (1873) and Persius (1875); edited Bishop Seabury's Communion Office (1874) and Historical Sermons of Bishop Seabury (1883–1886); and wrote on The Book of Common Prayer (1910) and Faith and the Faith (the Bohlen lectures, 1914).
