= Charles L. Shearer =

American academic

24th President of Transylvania University
- In office July 1, 1983 – July 30, 2010
- Preceded by: David G. Brown
- Succeeded by: R. Owen Williams

Personal details
- Born: November 1942 (age 83) Louisville, Kentucky
- Spouse: Susan Shearer (née Pulling)
- Education: University of Kentucky; Michigan State University
- Profession: Professor

Charles L. Shearer (born November 1942) is an American academic. He served as the 24th president of Transylvania University in Lexington, Kentucky ending his long tenure during the summer of 2010. Shearer is the longest-serving president in the university's 230-year history.

== Early life and education ==
Shearer was born in 1942 in Louisville, Kentucky. He earned a Bachelor of Science degree in accounting and Master of Arts degree in diplomacy and international commerce from the University of Kentucky. In addition, he earned a master's and Ph.D. in economics from Michigan State University. Shearer taught economics and accounting at the University of Kentucky's Henderson Community College and at Ferris State University. He also served as director of operations and as the first director of the liberal arts program in management at Albion College in Albion, Michigan. It was in Albion where Shearer met his future wife, Susan Pulling.

== Career ==
Shearer began his career at Transylvania as vice president for finance in 1979 and in 1981 took on the additional responsibilities of chief development officer.

In July 1983, Shearer was named the university's president after a tumultuous two-year period in which the school saw three different presidents. Shearer focused on increasing enrollment and the school's endowment as priorities during his tenure.

In the 27 years since, he assumed his position, the university's endowment grew from $32.8 million to its current $115 million—reaching a high of $140 million before the economic downturn. Enrollment increased from 655 in Shearer's first year as president to its current 1,158. Shearer also oversaw the construction of 12 new buildings and facilities on campus—the largest expansion the university has seen.

In the spring of 1999, Shearer was inducted into the University of Kentucky's Gatton College of Business and Economics Alumni Hall of Fame in recognition of his success and achievements.

== Retirement ==
At the October 24, 2009, Board of Trustees meeting Shearer made the surprise announcement that he would retire as president effective June 30, 2010. Shearer plans on remaining at Transylvania as a part-time professor in microeconomics in the initial phase of his retirement. On April 14, 2010, the Board of Trustees named historian and former businessman R. Owen Williams as Shearer's successor.

Transylvania University dedicated an art building in his honor. This building allows students to remember his legacy.
