= Charles Fulton (minister) =

American minister and businessman (1938–2022)

Charles Britton Fulton (April 30, 1938 - December 12, 2022) was an American minister and businessman who most notably served as president of ACTS 29 Ministries and who was a prominent leader in the Christian renewal movement of the 1980s and 1990s.

Fulton was born in West Palm Beach, Florida on April 30, 1938, the son of federal judge Charles B. Fulton. He achieved his bachelor's degree from Stetson University, where his focus was on pre-law and business studies. Following an experience at a Billy Graham crusade, he became convinced that his destiny lay with an ordination in the Episcopal Church.

Following his graduation from Stetson and a tour of duty in the United States Army, Fulton enrolled in Berkeley Divinity School at Yale University, where he received his M.Div. in 1964. He was ordained into the diaconate in August 1964, and became a priest in December of that year.

Fulton spent the next 30 years mostly as a parish priest, though from 1974 to 1980 he re-entered the business world as the Executive Vice President of Snelling & Snelling, which at the time was the world's largest employment agency. In 1980, however, he felt that God was calling him back into full-time ministry, and he resigned from the business world and started a new Episcopal church in Osprey, Florida. In 1987, he was called to a church in Jacksonville, Florida, and in 1993 he was chosen by the board of directors of ACTS 29 Ministries to serve as that organization's third president since its inception in 1973.

During his time at ACTS 29, Fulton moved the headquarters from Evergreen, Colorado to Atlanta, Georgia. He also founded the YouthQuake conference, which is held each January in Ridgecrest, North Carolina. He also served on the steering committee for the North American Renewal Service Committee, an umbrella organization that unites the renewal efforts of every major Christian denomination. Fulton also helped organized that organization's international conferences in Orlando, Florida (1995) and St. Louis, Missouri (2000). He was also one of the keynote speakers in 2000.

Fulton most recently was the senior priest for Holy Trinity Anglican Church in Marietta, Georgia, after departing as the senior priest of St. Jude's Episcopal Church in Marietta, Georgia, in 2016.

He died at home on December 12, 2022, after a lengthy illness.

== Published books ==
- 1994 - Reflections on the Run, ISBN 0-87788-818-3
- 2001 - Reflections on the Run (revised edition), ISBN 0-9710502-0-1
- 2001 - The River of Healing, ISBN 0-9710502-2-8
- 2001 - Touched By the Spirit, ISBN 0-9710502-1-X
