= Marion J. Hatchett =

Marion Josiah Hatchett (1927–2009) was an Episcopal priest, scholar, and one of the primary liturgists who shaped the 1979 Book of Common Prayer.

Born in Monroe, South Carolina, Hatchett was the son of a United Methodist minister. In December 1946—while studying at Wofford College in Spartanburg, South Carolina—he received his Episcopalian confirmation. He went from Wofford College to the University of the South, where he graduated from in 1951 with a Bachelor of Divinity. He was ordained deacon in the Diocese of Upper South Carolina in 1951, and then a priest in 1952. He served as a curate at the Church of the Advent, Spartanburg; deacon-in-charge of Incarnation, Gaffney, and Atonement, Blacksburg. Thereafter he took on the role of St. Peter's, Charleston's rector, where he also served as chaplain to The Citadel.

Desiring to further his education, he moved from Charlestown back to Sewanee, Tennessee in 1965 in order to pursue a Master of Sacred Theology degree, which he received in 1967. In 1969 he began serving on the faculty of The School of Theology of the University of the South. While serving there he worked on his doctoral studies through General Theological Seminary, receiving the degree of Doctor of Theology in 1972.

In the early 1970s—as work on the proposed "new Prayer Book" was underway—Hatchett's work (along with that of Massey Shepherd) deeply shaped the final version. In 1973, he was appointed to the Episcopal Church's Standing Commission on Church Music, serving as the chairperson of that text committee for The Hymnal 1982. In 1976, Hatchett was appointed a member of the Standing Liturgical Commission. He served as chairman of the committee which produced The Book of Occasional Services, 1979 as well as a member of the Episcopal Church's General Board of Examining Chaplains (1988–1994). He was also a member of the North American Academy of Liturgy.

After publication of the 1979 Book of Common Prayer, Hatchett authored the exhaustive Commentary on the American Prayer Book (1981), still the definitive resource on the history and theology of the Episcopal Church's current Prayer Book. He is also the author of Sanctifying Life, Time and Space: An Introduction to Liturgical Study (1976), A Manual for Clergy and Church Musicians (1980), The Making of the First American Book of Common Prayer (1982), and several journal articles.

In addition to his work with the 1979 Book of Common Prayer, Hymnal 1982 and Book of Occasional Services, he taught liturgical and church music at The School of Theology of the University of the South from February 1, 1969, until his retirement on May 16, 1999. On January 15, 1991, he was named the Cleveland Keith Benedict Professor of Pastoral Theology. Believing a seminary education involved more than information, Hatchett was known for opening his home to students throughout his 30 years as a professor. Even after his retirement he remained in Sewanee, playing an active role at The School of Theology, continuing to teach at an adjunct level and open his home to students. When the current professor of liturgy at The School of Theology went on sabbatical in the first semester of the 2007–2008 academic year, Hatchett, then 80 years old, returned to teach the senior liturgy course to another generation of priests. In 2008 General Theological Seminary awarded him their distinguished alumni award. The same year the School of Theology awarded him an honorary Doctor of Divinity.

Hatchett died of natural causes at Emerald-Hodgson Hospital in Sewanee, Tennessee on 7 August 2009.
