= Alexander Viets Griswold Allen =

American theologian and clergyman

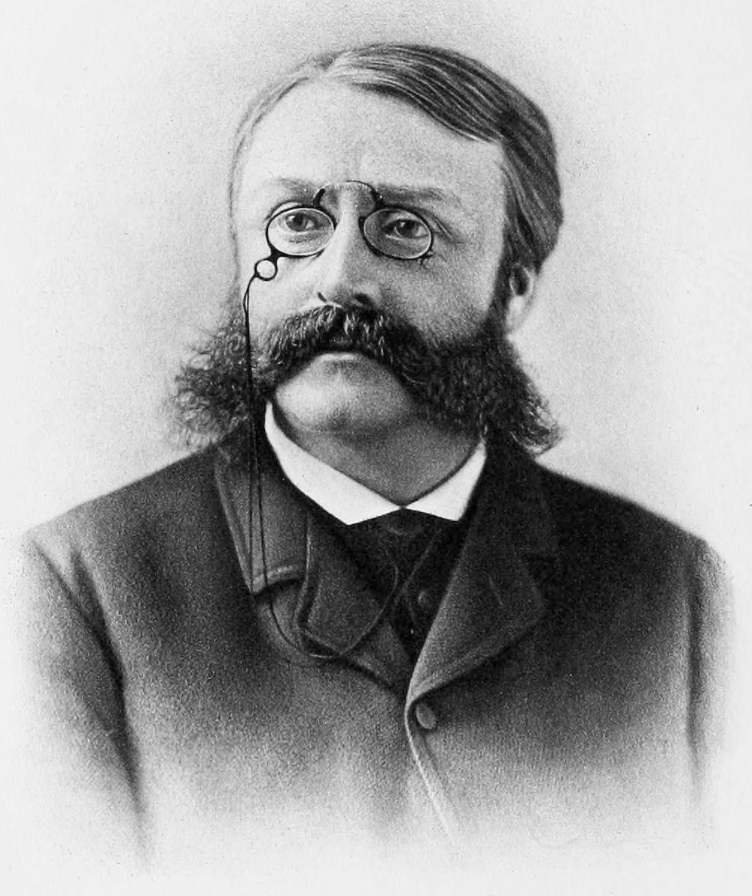
- Church: Episcopal

Orders
- Ordination: July 5, 1865 (deacon); June 24, 1866 (priest)

Personal details
- Born: May 4, 1841 Otis, Massachusetts, US
- Died: July 1, 1908 (aged 67) Cambridge, Massachusetts, US
- Occupation: Author; clergyman; theologian
- Education: Kenyon College; Andover Theological Seminary; Harvard; Yale
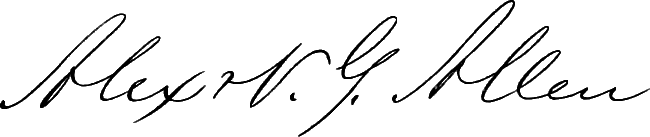
- Signature

Alexander Viets Griswold Allen (May 4, 1841 – July 1, 1908) was an American author, Episcopal clergyman and theologian.

== Biography ==
Allen was born in Otis, Massachusetts, on May 4, 1841, to Ethan and Lydia Child Allen, née Burr.

He graduated from Kenyon College in 1862 and Andover Theological Seminary in 1865. He received the degree D.D. from Kenyon 1878, from Harvard, 1886, and from Yale, 1901.

In 1872, he married Elizabeth Kent Stone; they remained together until her death in 1892. The couple had two children; Henry Van Dyke and John Stone Allen.

=== Career ===
Allen was a resident licentiate of Andover, Massachusetts, from 1865 to 1867, he also took orders in the Protestant Episcopal Church, being ordained a deacon, July 5, 1865, and priest, June 24, 1866. He was rector of St. John's church, Lawrence, Massachusetts, from 1865 to 1867, and professor of ecclesiastical history at the Episcopal theological school at Cambridge, Massachusetts, from 1867. He was elected a member of the Massachusetts Historical Society.

He died in Cambridge on July 1, 1908.

== Works ==
His publications include:

- The Continuity of Christian Thought (Boston, 1884; eleventh edition, 1895)
- The Greek Theology and the Renaissance of the Nineteenth Century (1884, his Bohlen Lectures)
- Jonathan Edwards (1889)
- Memoir of Phillips Brooks (1891)
- Religious Progress (1894)
- Christian Institutions (New York, 1897)
- Life and Letters of Bishop Brooks (two volumes, 1900)

Literature

- C. Slattery for his Life, (New York, 1911).
