= The John Bohlen Lectureship =

The John Bohlen Lectureship was a series of lectures on a subject relating to the Christian religion, delivered annually in the city of Philadelphia.

== History and endowment ==
John Bohlen, who died in Philadelphia on 26 April 1874, bequeathed to trustees $100,000, to be distributed to religious and charitable objects in accordance with the well-known wishes of the testator.

By a deed of trust, executed 2 June 1875, the trustees transferred and paid over to "The Rector, Church Wardens, and Vestrymen of the Church of the Holy Trinity, Philadelphia," in trust, a sum of money for certain designated purposes, out of which fund the sum of $10,000 was set apart for the endowment of The John Bohlen Lectureship, upon stated terms and conditions.

The conditions provided for the appointment of a qualified person, whether clergyman or layman, to deliver and allow to be published two or more lecture sermons, delivery to be in the city of Philadelphia. The subject was to be matters connected with or referring to the Christian religion.

The lecturer was appointed annually in May, by a committee consisting of:

- the Bishop of the Protestant Episcopal Church of the Diocese in which is the Church of the Holy Trinity
- the Rector of said Church
- the Professor of Biblical Learning in the Divinity School of the Protestant Episcopal Church in Philadelphia
- the Professor of Systematic Divinity in said School
- the Professor of Ecclesiastical History in said school.

== Catalogue of titles (incomplete) ==
- 1878: F. D. Huntington, Fitness of Christianity to Man, Thomas Whittaker
- 1879: Phillips Brooks, The Influence of Jesus, Griffith Farran & Co.
- 1880: J. S. Howson, The Evidential Value of the Acts of the Apostles, E. P. Dutton
- 1882: Samuel Smith Harris, The Relation of Christianity to Civil Society, Thomas Whittaker
- 1883: Alexander Viets Griswold Allen, The Continuity of Christian Thought: A Study of Modern Theology in the Light of its History, Houghton Mifflin Co.
- 1887: J. F. Garrison, The American Prayer Book: Its Principles and the Law of its Use, Porter & Coates
- 1891: W. R. Huntington, Peace of the Church, Nisbet
- 1895(?): Hugh Miller Thompson, The World and the Wrestlers: Personality and Responsibility, Thomas Whittaker
- 1897: Laurence Henry Schwab, The Kingdom of God: An Essay in Theology, E. P. Dutton & Co.
- 1899(?): Henry S. Nash, Ethics and Revelation, Macmillan
- 1905: Harry Peirce Nichols, The Temporary and the Permanent in New Testament Revelation, Thomas Whittaker
- 1906: James Alan Montgomery, The Samaritans, the Earliest Jewish Sect, The John C. Winston Co.
- 1909: Arthur Rogers, Prophecy and Poetry: Studies in Isaiah and Browning
- 1910: C. H. W. Johns, The Religious Significance of Semitic Proper Names, A. P. Dixon
- 1914: Samuel Hart, Faith and the Faith
- 1915: Andrew D. Heffern, Apology and Polemic in the New Testament
- 1919: Percy Dearmer, The Art of Public Worship, A. R. Mowbray & Co.
- 1924: Philo W. Sprague, Influence of Christianity on Fundamental Human Institutions, Fleming H. Revell Co.
- 1925: W. Cosby Bell, Sharing in Creation: Studies in the Christian View of the World, Macmillan
- 1928: Carl E. Grammer, Things that Remain
- 1931: Henry Bradford Washburn, Men of Conviction
- 1932: Walter Lowrie, Our Concern with the Theology of Crisis, Meador Publishing Company
- 1935: George A. Barton, The Apostolic Age and the New Testament
- 1936: Fleming James, Thirty Psalmists: A Study in Personalities of the Psalter as seen against the Background of Gunkel's Type-Study of the Psalms, Putnam
- 1938: Howard Chandler Robbins, Preaching the Gospel, Harper and Brothers
- 1943: Samuel A. B. Mercer, The Supremacy of Israel, Christopher Publishing House
- 1945(?): Theodore Otto Wedel, The Coming Great Church: Essays on Church Unity, Macmillan
- 1945: W. Norman Pittenger, His Body, the Church, Morehouse-Goreham Co.
- 1959: Massey Hamilton Shepherd, Jr., The Reform of Liturgical Worship: Perspectives and Prospects, Oxford University Press
- 1962: John Knox, The Church and the Reality of Christ, Harper & Row
