= William H. Vibbert =

American Hebraist and priest

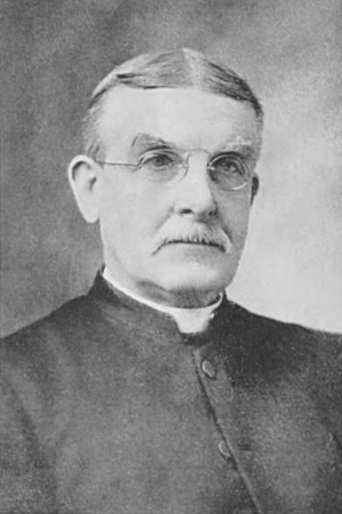
- Born: William Henry Vibbert; October 1, 1839; New Haven, Connecticut, US
- Died: August 27, 1918 (aged 78); Morristown, New Jersey, US
- Education: Trinity College, Hartford; Berkeley Divinity School
- Occupation: Priest
- Spouse: Julia Newbold Welsh

William Henry Vibbert (October 1, 1839 – August 27, 1918) was a prominent American Hebraist and priest of the Episcopal Church.

== Biography ==
Born in New Haven, Connecticut, he was educated at the Episcopal Academy in Cheshire, Connecticut, Trinity College, Hartford (1862, ΔΨ and ΦΒΚ) and Berkeley Divinity School in Middletown, Connecticut.

Following ordination to the priesthood by Bishop John Williams in 1863, he was Professor of Hebrew at Berkeley Divinity School, and rector of Christ Church, Middle Haddam, Connecticut 1863-1873; rector of St. Luke's Church, Germantown, Philadelphia (1873-1883); rector of St. James' Church, Chicago, (1883-1890) and rector of St. Peter's Church, Philadelphia (1890-1891). He spent the final years of his career as vicar of Trinity Chapel, Wall Street, New York (1891-1910, emeritus 1910-1918).

He was a deputy to the General Convention of the Protestant Episcopal Church in 1883, 1886, and 1889. He received the S.T.D. from Racine College in 1883. At St. James', Chicago, Vibbert assisted in the 1883 foundation of the Brotherhood of St. Andrew for laymen.

Although an associate of ritualist leader James DeKoven, Vibbert was generally considered an exponent of "Connecticut Churchmanship," a variety of High Church doctrine and practice from before the Tractarian Movement as expounded in the Episcopal Diocese of Connecticut. He married Julia Newbold Welsh (1845-1887). The couple had two sons. He died at his daughter's home in Morristown, New Jersey and is buried in the churchyard at St. Luke's, Germantown.

== Bibliography ==
- A Guide to Reading the Hebrew Text, for the Use of Beginners (Andover, 1872)
- The Formation and Management of Parochial Temperance Societies (New York: Church Temperance Society, 1883)
- An Historical Discourse Delivered in Saint James' Church, Chicago, on the Twentieth Sunday after Trinity, October 26th, 1884: The Semi-centennial Celebration of the Foundation of the Parish (Chicago: J.M.W. Jones Stationery, 1884)
- Mutual Help: A Sermon by the Rev. Dr. Wm. H. Vibbert, in Saint James' Church, Chicago, before the Diocesan Branch of the Girl's Friendly Society, on the Third Sunday after Easter, May 12, 1889 (Chicago: Fergus, 1889)
- Some Elements of Church Teaching (1893)
- A Plain Catechism on Church Principles
- A Plain Catechism on Confirmation
