= R. Owen Williams =

American historian

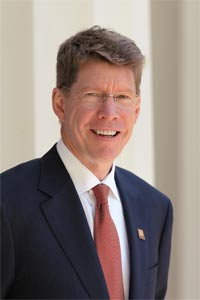

25th President of Transylvania University
- In office August 1, 2010 – June 30, 2014
- Preceded by: Charles L. Shearer
- Succeeded by: Seamus Carey

Personal details
- Spouse: Jennifer B. Williams
- Children: Tucker S. Williams, Penelope C. Williams
- Education: Dartmouth College; Cambridge University; Yale Law School; Yale University

Rick Owen Williams is a former president of the Associated Colleges of the South, a consortium of sixteen nationally recognized liberal arts colleges located throughout the South. Prior to becoming president at ACS, Williams served as the twenty-fifth president of Transylvania University, the sixteenth oldest college in America. He has served as vice-chair of the board at Gratz College and is currently on the board of Morehouse College, as well as the alumni advisory board of Cambridge University. Williams was formerly an investment banker for over two decades.

== Education ==
Williams earned an A.B. in philosophy from Dartmouth College and an M.A. in intellectual history from Cambridge University, before beginning a 24-year career on Wall Street as director of the government bond department at Salomon Brothers, executive director at Goldman Sachs, and chairman of Bear Stearns Asia. He spent more than a year living and working in Tokyo and three years living and working in Hong Kong.

Williams prepared himself for a career in academic administration by studying history and law at Yale University. He earned a master's of law from Yale Law School and a Ph.D. in history, specializing in nineteenth-century American history, from Yale University.

He was awarded the Raoul Berger Fellowship at Harvard Law School, the Samuel Golieb Fellowship at the New York University School of Law, the Fletcher Jones Fellowship at the Huntington Library, the Legal History Fellowship at Yale Law School, and the Cassius Marcellus Clay Postdoctoral Fellowship in history at Yale University.

== Career ==
Williams spent twenty-four years in various positions in finance, at Salomon Brothers, Goldman Sachs, and First Union (now Wells Fargo) where he was responsible for all fixed-income activities at the bank.

During his time as a graduate student and college administrator, starting when he was forty-eight years old, Williams published in several magazines, journals, and encyclopedias, including The Atlantic and Inside Higher Ed. He assistant edited The Encyclopedia of Antislavery and Abolition with editors Peter Hinks and John McKivigan and was an articles editor for the Yale Journal of Law and the Humanities.

Williams was selected to replace Charles Shearer, the longest-serving president in Transylvania University history, in April 2010 and assumed the office four months later. One of his major goals was to expand enrollment and the campus itself, leading to the dedication of a major new Athletics Complex in the spring of 2014.

On June 17, 2013, the Chairman of the Board of Trustees accepted Williams' resignation, to take effect at the end of the 2013–14 school year. Williams' resignation came after a 68–7 Transylvania University faculty no-confidence vote.
