= Prospectus =

A Prospectus is a document that describes an institution, publication, or business, or other proposal. It may refer to:

- Prospectus (finance), also called a concept note
- Prospectus (university)
- Prospectus (album), a 1983 album by saxophonist Steve Lacy
- Parkland College's newspaper
