= Massey H. Shepherd =

American historian

The Reverend Massey H. Shepherd
- Born: Massey Hamilton Shepherd Jr. March 14, 1913; Wilmington, North Carolina, US
- Died: February 19, 1990 (aged 76); Sacramento, California, US
- Known for: Role in the development of the 1979 Book of Common Prayer
- Spouse: Gabriella Taylor Connor

Ecclesiastical career
- Religion: Christianity (Anglican)
- Church: Episcopal Church (United States)
- Ordained: 1941 (deacon · priest)

Academic background
- Education: University of South Carolina; University of Chicago; Berkeley Divinity School
- Influences: William Palmer Ladd

Academic work
- Discipline: History; theology
- Sub-discipline: Ecclesiastical history; liturgics
- Institutions: Episcopal Theological School; Church Divinity School of the Pacific
- Notable works: The Oxford American Prayer Book Commentary (1950)

Massey Hamilton Shepherd Jr. (March 14, 1913 – February 19, 1990) was an American priest and scholar of the Episcopal Church. A prominent liturgist, he was one of the few American members of other Christian churches honored with an invitation to observe the Second Vatican Council of the Roman Catholic Church in the 1960s. He served on the Episcopal Church's Standing Liturgical Commission from 1947 to 1976 and was a leading figure in developing the 1979 Book of Common Prayer used by the Episcopal Church.

== Early life ==
Shepherd was born on March 14, 1913, in Wilmington, North Carolina, the second child and only son of Alice Louise Gladstone Melville and Massey Hamilton Shepherd Sr. He spent many of his younger years in Columbia, South Carolina. He was confirmed in what is now Trinity Episcopal Cathedral, across from the State House in South Carolina's capital city.

Shepherd was married to Gabriella Taylor Connor, an artist and watercolorist. They had one daughter, Nancy Lloyd, who is married and has two children.

== Academic career ==
In 1928, he finished at the top of his class at Columbia High School at fifteen in Columbia, South Carolina. Less than four years later, he received both an undergraduate and a graduate degree simultaneously from the University of South Carolina in classical studies. Shepherd was one of the youngest students in the history of the university to achieve two degrees by age 19. In 1937, he received his Doctor of Philosophy degree from the University of Chicago and, in 1941, his Bachelor of Divinity degree from Berkeley Divinity School in New Haven, Connecticut, where he worked closely with its Dean, liturgical reformer William Palmer Ladd, whose work he was to continue.

Early in his teaching career he held a faculty position at the Episcopal Theological School in Cambridge, Massachusetts. For many years, he was a faculty member at the Church Divinity School of the Pacific in Berkeley, California, and also in the Graduate Theological Union.

He was instrumental in the success of the Sewanee Church Music Conference which began in July 1951 at the University of the South at Sewanee, Tennessee. Richard White (who served as registrar for 13 years) related: "He was probably the finest liturgist in the country. He could talk for fifty minutes (the length of the classes) on the Prayer Book, the psalms, the structure of the service, etc. with no notes and never searched for a word."

Shepherd also served as the head of the Church Historical Society for many years.

He was the author of over eighty publications, including The Living Liturgy (Oxford University Press, 1946), The Oxford American Prayer Book Commentary (Oxford University Press, 1950), and The Worship of the Church, Seabury Press, 1952).

He contributed commentaries on the Gospel According to John and the three Epistles of John to The Interpreter's One-Volume Commentary on the Bible (Abingdon Press, 1971).

In The Paschal Liturgy and the Apocalypse he refers to the Revelation to St. John the Divine in parallel to the Last Supper.

Shepherd died on February 19, 1990, in Sacramento, California.

== See also ==
- Marion J. Hatchett
