= St. Augustine College (Illinois) =

Private university in Chicago, Illinois, US

Coordinates: 41°58′19.7″N 87°39′49.4″W

- Type: Private college
- Active: 1980–2023
- Accreditation: HLC
- Academic affiliations: HACU; Private Illinois Colleges & Universities (PICU); Colleges and Universities of Anglican Communion (CUAC)
- President: Dr. Reyes González
- Faculty: 9 Full-time and 62 Part-time (Spring 2022)
- Students: 737(Spring 2022)
- Location: Chicago, Illinois, United States
- Website: www.staugustine.edu

St. Augustine College was a private college in Chicago, Illinois. It was the first bilingual institution of higher education in Illinois. It was founded on October 7, 1980, under the auspices of the Episcopal Diocese of Chicago. The founding of a college was the culmination of ten years of work by Spanish Episcopal Services and Father Carlos A. Plazas, Ph.D. On April 25, 2023, it was announced that St. Augustine would merge with Lewis University at the end of the Fall 2023 semester, maintaining its bilingual instruction legacy as St. Augustine College of Lewis University.

== Academics ==
St. Augustine College was accredited by the Higher Learning Commission and offered bachelor's degrees in Business Administration, Psychology, Hospitality Management, Computer Information Systems and Social Work. Associate degrees in Child Development, Interdisciplinary, Psychology Social Service, Spanish, Computer Information Systems, Criminal Justice, Accounting, Administrative Assistant, Business Management, Computer Information Systems, Culinary Arts, Early Childhood Education, Respiratory Therapy, and General Studies. St. Augustine College's Social Work program is accredited by the Council on Social Work Education’s Commission.

The college enrolled roughly 1,000 students at the time of its closing. St. Augustine College offered 14 degree programs at both the associates and bachelors level. The approximate tuition rate for St. Augustine is $13,200 per academic year.
