= William Palmer Ladd =

American Episcopal priest, liturgical scholar and seminary dean

The Reverend William Palmer Ladd
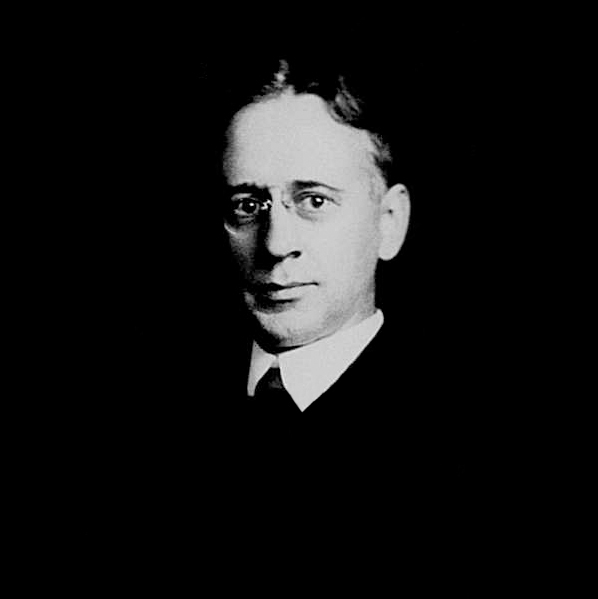
- Passport application, 1916
- Born: May 13, 1870; Lancaster, New Hampshire, US
- Died: July 1, 1941 (aged 71)
- Title: Dean of Berkeley Divinity School (1918–1941)
- Spouse: Ailsie Tayor (m. 1915)

Ecclesiastical career
- Religion: Christianity (Anglican)
- Church: Episcopal Church (United States)
- Ordained: 1897 (deacon); 1898 (priest)

Academic background
- Education: Dartmouth College; General Theological Seminary; Harvard University

Academic work
- Discipline: History; theology
- Sub-discipline: Ecclesiastical history; liturgics
- School or tradition: Liturgical Movement; Social Gospel
- Institutions: Berkeley Divinity School
- Notable works: Prayer Book Interleaves (1943)
- Influenced: Massey H. Shepherd

William Palmer Ladd (1870–1941) was an American Episcopal priest, liturgical scholar, and seminary dean.

== Biography ==
Ladd was born on May 13, 1870, in Lancaster, New Hampshire. He received a Bachelor of Arts degree from Dartmouth College in 1891 and a Bachelor of Divinity degree from the General Theological Seminary in 1897. Ladd was ordained deacon on June 11, 1897, and priest on June 11, 1898.

After work as a parish priest in the Episcopal Diocese of New Hampshire, he served as professor of church history (1904–1941) at Berkeley Divinity School, of which he later became dean (1918–1941). The school had been founded in Middletown, Connecticut, but Ladd worked to move it to New Haven, home of Yale University, believing connection with a major university and presence in an urban center were better suited to training of clergy.

As Dean of Berkeley, Ladd was seen as an inspiring if sometimes controversial figure. Socialist in sympathies, he chaired a major review of child welfare for the state of Connecticut. He was responsible for bringing to the USA a number of sympathetic Anglican thinkers as visiting professors including Percy Dearmer and Geoffrey Studdert Kennedy.

Ladd died on July 1, 1941, in New Haven.

== Influence ==
Ladd was active in the dissemination of Liturgical Movement principles in the Episcopal Church in the United States of America. His book Prayer Book Interleaves, published only after his death, was based on columns that had appeared in the Episcopal Church magazine The Witness. It was reprinted in 1957 with a new introduction by his student Massey H. Shepherd and then again in the centenary year of his appointment as Dean of Berkeley.

Shepherd himself and others including Urban T. Holmes III viewed Ladd as the instigator of the processes of reform that ultimately led to the adoption of the 1979 Book of Common Prayer.

== See also ==
- Social Gospel

== Bibliography ==
- Prayer Book Interleaves: Some Reflections on How the Book of Common Prayer Might Be Made More Influential (1943)
