= Ashmont, Boston =

Coordinates: 42°17′00″N 71°04′08″W

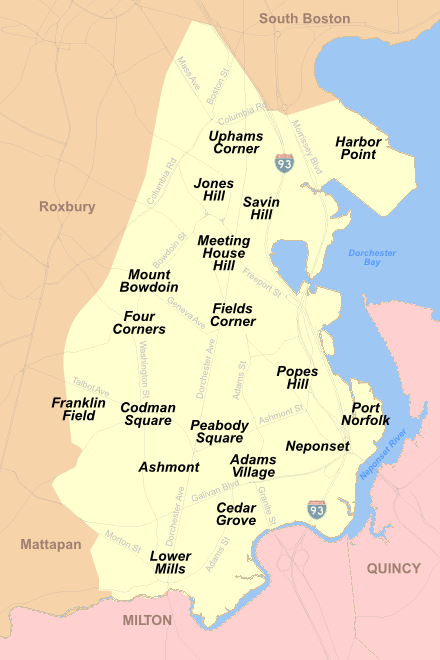
Map showing the locations of Dorchester neighborhoods, including Ashmont

Ashmont is a section of the Dorchester neighborhood of Boston, Massachusetts. It includes the subsections of Ashmont Hill, Peabody Square, and Ashmont-Adams. Located near Boston's border with the town of Milton, major streets include Ashmont Street, Gallivan Boulevard, and Dorchester Avenue.

== History ==
The neighborhood was developed after Dorchester's annexation to Boston in 1870. The westerly side of the neighborhood, north of Fuller Street and west of Dorchester Avenue, north to Welles Avenue, was laid out on the former Welles estate. The more easterly side of the neighborhood, east of the station, south of Ashmont Street, and north of Minot Street and Van Winkle Street was developed by the Carruth family on their former estate.

The neighborhood is known for its larger Victorian style houses on the former estates with other side streets such as Fuller, Burt, Dracut, and Wrentham Streets having a denser two and three family development pattern. Dorchester Avenue in the area has an urban neighborhood commercial development pattern.

All Saints Church, an Episcopal Church in Ashmont, was designed by the architect Ralph Adams Cram and dedicated in 1892. It is listed on the National Register of Historic Places.

Ashmont Hill Architectural Conservation District is a pending Boston Landmark.

== Public transportation ==
The MBTA has Red Line direct subway service to Downtown Boston, Harvard Square and other Cambridge locations (and ultimately to Alewife Station) at the Ashmont station and there is a link to the Mattapan Line trolley going to Mattapan.
