= Granville M. Williams =

Granville Mercer Williams SSJE (December 31, 1889 — August 11, 1980) was an American Anglo-Catholic priest, monk, and author during the twentieth century. Williams was born in Utica, New York to a prominent New England family and studied at Columbia University (1911) and Harvard Divinity School (1920). He was ordained to the priesthood in 1920 and served as rector of St. Paul's Church, Carroll Street, Brooklyn from 1926 to 1930, and of the Church of St. Mary the Virgin, Times Square, from 1930 to 1939.

Williams was a mission priest of the Society of St John the Evangelist or Cowley Fathers, serving as assistant superior from 1924 to 1930 and superior of the American Congregation from 1939 to 1963. He was also involved extensively in Anglican religious life for women, serving as chaplain to the American All Saints Sisters of the Poor from 1939 to 1969, and warden of the Order of S. Anne in Arlington, Massachusetts from 1939 until his death in 1980.

He was president of the Catholic Clerical Union from 1932 to 1941, and a member of the American council of the Confraternity of the Blessed Sacrament from 1952 to 1965. Williams also served as editor of American Church Monthly from 1934 to 1939.

The estate of Fr. Williams's father, Granville Whittlesey Williams (1859-1947), president of the Murray Hill Iron Company, was a significant source of the Cowley Fathers' wealth in the United States in the twentieth century.

== Bibliography ==
- "The Eucharistic Sacrifice" in The First Annual Catholic Congress: Essays and Papers (1926)
- The Touch of Christ: Lectures on the Christian Sacraments (1928)
- "The Catholic and Penitence" in The Catholic Life: Addresses and Papers Delivered at the Fourth Annual Catholic Conference, New York City, November 13th to 15th, 1928 (1929)
- "Liberal Catholicism and Modernism" in Liberal Catholicism and the Modern World (1933), edited by Frank Gavin
- Toward Self-Discipline: A Rule of Life (1958)
- The Shrine on Bowdoin Street, 1883-1958: The Story of the Mission Church of Saint John the Evangelist in the City of Boston, Massachusetts as Told at the Time of Its Seventy-fifth Anniversary (1958)
- Joy in the Lord (1972)
