= Robert Ritchie (priest) =

American Anglo-Catholic priest (1845–1907)

Robert Ritchie (March 6, 1845 – January 7, 1907) was a prominent American Anglo-Catholic priest, author, and leader. He was born in Philadelphia and graduated from the University of Pennsylvania where he was a member of the Philomathean Society (1862); he was next graduated from the General Theological Seminary (1867) in New York. He was made deacon on June 30, 1867, and ordained to the priesthood in 1869. Ritchie served as curate at both the Church of the Messiah and the Church of the Advent in Boston.

Ritchie was elected rector of the Church of St. James the Less, Philadelphia in 1870 and served as rector for the ensuing 37 years. He was a deputy to the General Convention of the Protestant Episcopal Church in 1904. He was also a founder in 1897 of the Clerical Union for the Maintenance and Defense of Catholic Principles and a member of the Catholic Club of Philadelphia.

== Personal life ==
Ritchie married Helena Bridge on June 21, 1871, in Boston. His brother Arthur Ritchie was also a major Anglo-Catholic leader, serving as rector of the Church of St. Ignatius of Antioch in New York City and editor of the Catholic Champion newspaper. (Robert Ritchie was a primary contributor to the Champion.) Another brother, Edward Ritchie (1851-1936) succeeded Robert Ritchie as rector of St. James the Less, becoming rector emeritus in 1924 after retiring in 1923.

== Bibliography ==
- The Growth of the Papal Supremacy and Feudalism (New York Church Club Lectures, 1894)
- The Indissolubility of Marriage (1896)
- A Sermon Preached before the Vice-President and Council of the Clerical Union for the Maintenance and Defense of Catholic Principles, and the Catholic Club of Philadelphia in Memory of the Reverend Henry Robert Percival, D.D. in St. Mark's Church, Philadelphia, November 10th, 1903 (1903) from Philadelphia Studies
