= Catholic Clerical Union =

American Anglo-Catholic organisation

The Catholic Clerical Union was an American Anglo-Catholic organization founded in 1886 as the Clerical Union for the Maintenance and Defence of Catholic Principles, to promote catholic principles and practice in the Episcopal Church. Its membership was open to clergy and seminarians.

In 2006, its website listed chapters for Albany, Chicago, Dallas-Fort Worth, New England, New York-New Jersey-Connecticut, and Northern Indiana. In subsequent years, however, the union became defunct.

An entity with the name "Catholic Clerical Union" was incorporated in California as a domestic non-profit on October 12, 2017 (entity no. 4073892). However, the entity's current status is listed as "Suspended - FTB/SOS" - suspended by the California Franchise Tax Board (FTB) and/or the Secretary of State (SOS), likely for either unpaid fees and/or failure to file a statement of information (SOS).

== Bibliography ==
- Harry St Clair Hathaway, Bishops Suffragan (1909)
- The Anglo-Catholic (Periodical published at Milwaukee beginning in 1975)

== Notable members ==
- Donald L. Garfield
- Frank Gavin
- Edward Rochie Hardy Jr.
- Henry Harrison Oberly
- Arthur Ritchie
- Robert Ritchie
- Granville Mercer Williams SSJE

== See also ==
- Society of the Holy Cross
- Society of Catholic Priests
