= Grieg Taber =

American priest (1895–1964)

Grieg Taber (January 21, 1895 – April 8, 1964) was a prominent Anglo-Catholic priest in the American Episcopal Church during the twentieth century.

== Biography ==
Taber was born on January 21, 1895, in Omaha, Nebraska, and educated at the former St. Stephen's College, Annandale-on-Hudson (BA) and the former Seabury Divinity School (BD 1919). He was ordained to the diaconate in June 1919 and to the priesthood in December 1919. Initially a priest-educator, Taber was master at the Shattuck School in Faribault, Minnesota from 1918 to 1920, and chaplain and instructor in History and Greek at the Trinity-Pawling School (1920–1927).

Taber achieved national prominence as an Anglo-Catholic leader as rector of All Saints Church, Ashmont, Dorchester, Massachusetts (1927–1939) and rector of St. Mary the Virgin, Times Square, from 1939 until his death in 1964. He was a trustee of St. Luke's Home for Destitute and Aged Women, treasurer-general of the American Confraternity of the Blessed Sacrament from 1953 to 1963, and received an honorary Doctor of Divinity degree from Seabury-Western Theological Seminary in 1940.

Taber was a bachelor. He died on April 8, 1964, from a heart attack, at the Metropolitan Opera during Giacomo Puccini's Tosca. He was buried in Milton Cemetery, Massachusetts, beside his brother and mother. He was succeeded as priest by Donald L. Garfield.
