= David Herd =

David Herd or Hurd may refer to:

- David Herd (anthologist) (1732–1810), Scottish anthologist
- David Herd (footballer) (1934–2016), Scottish footballer
- David Hurd (born 1950), composer
- David N. Hurd (born 1937), U.S. judge
