= Order of St. Anne (Anglican) =

Anglican religious order

The Order of St. Anne (OSA) is an Anglican religious order of nuns founded in 1910 by the Rev. Frederick Cecil Powell, a member of the Society of St. John the Evangelist, and by its first member and superior Etheldred Barry (a children's book illustrator, whose work included the Little Colonel series made famous on screen by Shirley Temple) at Arlington Heights, Massachusetts.

The Order conducted a school for girls on the Arlington site which subsequently became the Germaine Lawrence School, which continues today. Another group of sisters from Arlington founded a community - Bethany - in China, which moved to the Philippines after foreign Christian groups were expelled after the Chinese Communist Revolution. The group returned to the United States in the 1970s with several Filipina members, and worked first at a school in Lincoln and then moved to a new house on the original Arlington site, adjacent to a small group who remained there and to the former Germaine Lawrence School. The Bethany Convent continues a ministry of prayer today. Its superior is Sr Ana Clara.

The Convent of St. Anne in Chicago was established at the Anglo-Catholic Church of the Ascension in 1921 in response to a call from the rector and vestry for sisters to do missionary work in the parish. The Chicago convent is autonomous, called to parish work. The nuns worked at the Church of the Ascension as teachers and counselors.

As of 2008, Sister Judith Marie was the Reverend Mother of the Chicago convent. As of 2022, she is the only remaining nun there.

== See also ==
- Granville M. Williams SSJE, warden beginning in 1939
