= Leonel Mitchell =

The Reverend Leonel Mitchell
- Born: Leonel Lake Mitchell; July 23, 1930; New York, U.S.
- Died: May 23, 2012 (aged 81); South Bend, Indiana, U.S.

Ecclesiastical career
- Religion: Christianity (Anglican)
- Church: Episcopal Church (United States)
- Ordained: 1954 (deacon · priest)

Academic background
- Education: Trinity College; Berkeley Divinity School; General Theological Seminary
- Doctoral advisor: H. Boone Porter

Academic work
- Discipline: Theology
- Sub-discipline: Liturgics
- Institutions: University of Notre Dame; Seabury-Western Theological Seminary

Leonel Lake Mitchell (July 23, 1930 – May 23, 2012) was an American scholar of liturgy in the Episcopal Church in the United States of America, and a major reviser of its 1979 Book of Common Prayer. He was the author of multiple books in the field of liturgics.

== Education ==
Mitchell was born in New York on July 23, 1930. He graduated from Trinity School (New York City) in 1947 and Trinity College (Connecticut) in Hartford in 1951. For his basic theological studies, Mitchell attended Berkeley Divinity School, graduating with a master's degree in sacred theology in 1954. (Before his retirement, Berkeley awarded Mitchell an honorary doctorate.) Shortly, after graduation, he was ordained as a deacon and then as a priest of the Episcopal Church.

In the fall of 1959, Mitchell entered the General Theological Seminary as a doctoral student in ecclesiastical history. However, when the seminary called H. Boone Porter Jr. to be professor of liturgics, Mitchell switched his major to liturgics and completed his doctoral dissertation in December 1963. When he received his doctorate in 1964, Mitchell had earned the first doctor's degree in liturgics awarded by an Episcopal seminary.

== Parish priest ==
Between his student and his teaching careers, Mitchell served as a parish priest: first at Christ Church, Riverdale, then Saint John in the Wilderness, Copake Falls, NY, then Christ Church, Warwick, NY, then at St Luke's, Beacon, NY. During his years as a parish priest, Mitchell served as chaplain for many area organizations including Goodwill Hook and Ladder Fire Department, Phi Beta Kappa, and the Boy Scouts. He joined young people in protesting against the war in Vietnam and he worked to unite black and white parishioners.

In 1971, Mitchell and his family moved to South Bend, IN so that he could pursue a full-time teaching career at Notre Dame University.

== Teaching career ==
“Worship, religious activity in all of its aspects – what we do and how we do it, as well as what we say and how we say it – underlies religious belief.” Leonel Mitchell

From 1971 to 1978, Mitchell served as an assistant professor in the University of Notre Dame's Department of Theology and as director of its master's program from 1974 to 1978. He was the first Episcopal priest to serve as a full-time faculty member at Notre Dame.

From 1978 to 1995, Mitchell was professor of liturgics at Seabury-Western Theological Seminary and lecturer in Church history and liturgy at Seabury-Western from 1978 to 2005, after which he became a professor emeritus. In 1978, Mitchell was made an honorary canon and in 2008, he became canon theologian at the Cathedral of St. James in South Bend, Indiana.

== Death ==
Mitchell died on May 23, 2012, aged 81, at Hospice House in South Bend.

== Bibliography ==
- "The Baptismal Rite in Chrysostom," Anglican Theological Review 1961
- Baptismal Anointing (S.P.C.K., 1966)
- (Donald L. Garfield, editor) Towards a Living Liturgy: The Liturgy of the Lord's Supper Examined in Essays (1969, contributor)
- Liturgical Change: How Much Do We Need? (Seabury, 1975)
- The Seabury-Western Customary: A Guide for the Conduct of the Principal Services of the Book of Common Prayer 1979 (Seabury-Western Theological Seminary, 1982)
- The Way We Pray (Forward Movement Publications, 1984) ISBN 9780880281850
- The Meaning of Ritual (Paulist/Morehouse, 1988) ISBN 9780819214515
- New Images of God: No Language Is Inclusive Enough (Forward Movement, 1990)
- Praying Shapes Believing (Morehouse, 1991) ISBN 9780819215536
- Planning the Church Year (Winston/Morehouse, 1991) ISBN 9780819215543
- Worship, Initiation and the Churches (1991) ISBN 9780912405841
- Lent, Holy Week, Easter, and the Great Fifty Days: A Ceremonial Guide (Rowman & Littlefield, 1996) ISBN 9781561011346
- The Way We Pray: an Introduction to the Book of Common Prayer (Forward Movement Publications, rev 1997)
- Pastoral and Occasional Liturgies: A Ceremonial Guide (Rowman & Littlefield, 1998) ISBN 9781561011582

In addition to his writings, Mitchell discussed his liturgical work at length in the video series Claiming the Vision: Baptismal Identity in the Episcopal Church available on YouTube as follows:

- Leonel Mitchell, "Claiming the Vision: Baptism and the Sacramental Life"
- Leonel Mitchell, "Claiming the Vision: The History and Theology of the Baptism Rite in the 1979 Prayer Book"
- Leonel Mitchell, "Claiming the Vision: Understanding the Baptismal Ecclesiology of the Episcopal Church"
