= Arthur Ritchie (priest) =

American Anglo-Catholic priest (1849–1921)

Arthur Ritchie (June 22, 1849 - July 9, 1921) was a prominent American Anglo-Catholic priest, author, and leader. He was born in Philadelphia and graduated from the University of Pennsylvania in 1867. He was next graduated from the General Theological Seminary in New York in 1871. He was made deacon by Bishop Horatio Potter on July 2, 1871, for the Episcopal Diocese of New York and served brief curacies at S. Clement's Church, Philadelphia and the Church of the Advent, Boston.

He was assistant priest of Mount Calvary Church, Baltimore in 1874. Ritchie served as rector of the Church of the Ascension, Chicago from 1875 to 1884 and then most notably as rector of the Church of St. Ignatius of Antioch, New York, from 1884 to 1914. The parish's current building was completed to Anglo-Catholic specifications in 1902 during Ritchie's tenure, featuring a tabernacle for reservation of the Blessed Sacrament, built-in confessional booths, permanent stoups for holy water, and a de-emphasized pulpit (which was itself removed in 1929).

A prolific author, Ritchie was the editor of the major Anglo-Catholic periodical The Catholic Champion from December 1, 1888, to November 1, 1901. (The Catholic Champion merged with The Living Church in 1901.) He was also a founder with his brother Robert of the Clerical Union for the Maintenance and Defense of Catholic Principles. He received an honorary doctorate from Nashotah House Theological Seminary in Wisconsin in 1904.

== Personal life ==
Arthur Ritchie's brothers Robert Ritchie and Edward Ritchie were also prominent Anglo-Catholic priests, both serving in succession as rectors of the Church of St. James the Less in Philadelphia between 1870 and 1923. He was unmarried, and he was buried from St. Ignatius of Antioch at Rockland Cemetery in Sparkill, New York.

== Bibliography ==
- Some Common Objections to Catholic Worship and the Answers to Them: Being the Substance of a Sermon Preached at the Church of the Ascension, Chicago, Sunday, Aug. 1st, 1880 (Chicago, 1880)
- Spiritual Studies in St. John's Gospel for Workaday Christians (Chicago, 1887)
- The Ave Maria and Other Sermons: Preached in St. Ignatius' Church, New York (New York, 1889)
- Dancing before the Lord, and Other Sermons (New York, 1889)
- With a Song in the Heart, and Other Sermons, Preached in St. Ignatius' Church, New York (New York, 1890)
- What Catholics Believe and Do: Or Simple Instructions Concerning the Church's Faith and Practice (New York, 1891)
- Perishing in Jerusalem, and Other Sermons Preached in St. Ignatius' Church (New York, 1893)
- The Prodigal's Elder Brother, and Other Sermons Preached in St. Ignatius' Church, New York (New York, 1893)
- The Stars of God, and Other Sermons (New York, 1895)
- The Chastening of the Lord: Sermon Preached in the Church of St. Mary the Virgin, on All Souls' Day, November the 2d, 1896 (New York, 1897)
- The Unjust Steward, and Other Sermons (New York, 1896)
- Adrift among the Dead, and Other Sermons (New York, 1897)
- Through Fire and Water, and Other Sermons, Preached in St. Ignatius' Church, New York (New York, 1897)
- God's Good Cheer, and Other Sermons (New York, 1899)
- Alexander the Coppersmith, and Other Sermons Preached in St. Ignatius' Church, New York (New York, 1900)
- Children of the Resurrection, and Other Sermons Preached in St. Ignatius' Church, New York (New York, 1901)
- Two Pence, and Other Sermons (New York, 1901)
- Spiritual Studies in St. Matthew's Gospel (New York, 1902)
  - volume one
  - volume two
- A Sermon in the Memory of Rev. George H. Moffett, Rector of St. Clement’s Church (1905) from Philadelphia Studies
- Spiritual Studies in St. John's Gospel (Milwaukee, 1913)
  - volume one
  - volume two
  - volume three
  - volume four
  - volume five
  - volume six
  - volume seven
- Spiritual Studies in St. Mark's Gospel (Milwaukee, 1917)
  - volume one
  - volume two
  - volume three
