= Donald L. Garfield =

Donald Lothrop Garfield (May 4, 1924 — April 8, 1996) was a prominent American Anglo-Catholic priest and liturgist during the twentieth century.

Garfield was born in Cambridge, Massachusetts. His undergraduate studies were interrupted for two years by service in the United States Navy as a communications officer on Okinawa during the Second World War. Following degrees at Harvard University (BA, 1946) and the General Theological Seminary in New York (STB, 1949), he was ordained to the priesthood in April 1950 by Bishop Oliver Leland Loring of the Episcopal Diocese of Maine.

Garfield is notable primarily for his advocacy of the principles of the Liturgical Movement in the Episcopal Church, and for his work on the committee that revised the 1928 Book of Common Prayer (BCP). Despite no degree in liturgical studies, Garfield was a member of the Episcopal Church's Standing Liturgical Commission from 1967 to 1976. He was the author of the 1979 BCP's Rite One Eucharistic Prayer II, "Alternative Form of the Great Thanksgiving," (pages 340–343).

He was curate at Mount Calvary Church, Baltimore from 1949 to 1954, and at the Church of the Ascension and St. Agnes in Washington, D.C. from 1954 to 1958. His most significant national role was as rector of the Church of St. Mary the Virgin, Times Square, New York, from 1965 to 1978, when the parish's liturgical usage was an acknowledged important standard for international Anglo-Catholicism. Garfield notably changed parish practice away from the model of a "non-communicating High Mass" at which only the celebrant had received Holy Communion during the principal service from approximately 1868 to 1965. He also presided over the parish's 1968 centenary celebrations, and organized a 1975 service at which Episcopalians and Orthodox Christians received communion simultaneously.

He was an associate priest from 1980 to 1990 at Grace and St. Peter's Church in Baltimore. Throughout his ministry, he was a vocal opponent of the ordination of women to the priesthood in the Episcopal Church, as cited in newspaper interviews beginning in 1974.

Garfield was director of the St. Michael's Conference for Youth from 1962 to 1969; a trustee of the House of the Redeemer (a New York City retreat house); president of the Catholic Clerical Union (1970–1980); trustee of the Cathedral of St. John the Divine from 1972 to 1979; and a trustee of the Frank Gavin Liturgical Foundation from 1973 until his death in Baltimore.

== Bibliography ==
- Ecce sacerdos magnus: The Archbishop of Canterbury at the Church of St. Mary the Virgin, New York, October 1, 1967 (1967)
- (editor and contributor) Towards a Living Liturgy: The Liturgy of the Lord's Supper Examined in Essays (1969) [anthology of writings by Louis Weil, Robert E. Terwilliger, H. Boone Porter, Edward Rochie Hardy, Jr., Leonel Mitchell, John Macquarrie, Robert Walters, James A. Carpenter, et al.]
- Worship in Spirit and in Truth: Papers from a Conference Sponsored and Held At Church of St. Mary the Virgin (1970)
- (contributor) Raiment for the Lord's Service: A Thousand Years of Western Vestments (Chicago Art Institute, 1975)
- Do This (filmstrip)
