= H. Boone Porter Jr. =

The Reverend H. Boone Porter
- Born: Harry Boone Porter Jr. January 10, 1923; Louisville, Kentucky, US
- Died: June 5, 1999 (aged 76); Bridgeport, Connecticut, US
- Known for: Role in the development of the 1979 Book of Common Prayer
- Spouse: Violet Monser Porter (m. c. 1957)

Ecclesiastical career
- Religion: Christianity (Anglican)
- Church: Episcopal Church (United States)
- Ordained: 1950 (deacon); 1952 (priest)

Academic background
- Education: Yale University; Berkeley Divinity School; General Theological Seminary; University of Oxford
- Thesis: A Study in the Liturgical Reforms of Charlemagne (1954)

Academic work
- Discipline: Theology
- Sub-discipline: Ecclesiastical history; liturgics
- Institutions: Nashotah House; General Theological Seminary
- Doctoral students: Leonel Mitchell
- Notable students: Marion J. Hatchett

Harry Boone Porter Jr. (1923–1999) was an American Episcopal priest, liturgist, and editor of The Living Church magazine.

Born on January 10, 1923, in Louisville, Kentucky, Porter was an alumnus of St. Paul's School in Concord, New Hampshire. He received his bachelor's degree from Yale University in 1947 and his STB from the Berkeley Divinity School in 1950.

Porter was made deacon on April 12, 1950, and ordained to the priesthood on April 16, 1952. From 1950 until 1952, Porter was a fellow and tutor at the General Theological Seminary of the Episcopal Church, from which in 1952 he received an STM. He earned his DPhil from the University of Oxford in 1954. He taught ecclesiastical history at Nashotah House, 1954–1960, and he was Professor of Liturgics at General Seminary from 1960 until 1970.

He became editor of The Living Church magazine in 1977, retiring in 1990. In 1996, he received a master's degree in environmental studies from the Yale School of Forestry & Environmental Studies.

In addition to many other responsibilities in the Episcopal Church, Porter served on the Standing Liturgical Commission from 1961 to 1976, and the General Board of Examining Chaplains from 1970 to 1982. He was a member of Associated Parishes for Liturgy and Mission, the Anglican Society, the Alcuin Club, and the Living Church Foundation, Inc.

Porter died on June 5, 1999, in Bridgeport, Connecticut.

== Published works ==
- The Day of Light: The Biblical and Liturgical Meaning of Sunday (1960)
- Samuel Seabury, Bishop in a New Nation (1962)
- Growth and Life in the Local Church (1968)
- (Donald L. Garfield, editor) Towards a Living Liturgy: The Liturgy of the Lord's Supper Examined in Essays (1969, contributor)
- Keeping the Church Year (1977)
- Jeremy Taylor, Liturgist (1613–1667) (1979)
- A Song of Creation (1986) ISBN 9780936384344
