= Henry Harrison Oberly =

Episcopal priest (born 1841)

Henry Harrison Oberly (June 19, 1841 - March 19, 1914) was a prominent Episcopal priest and author. He was born in Easton, Pennsylvania, and baptized at the First Presbyterian Church; he was a student of James DeKoven at Racine College, where he was confirmed in the Episcopal Church. After studies at Trinity College, Hartford (B.A. 1865, M.A. 1868), and the Berkeley Divinity School, he was ordained to the diaconate in 1867 and to the priesthood in 1869.

Oberly was curate of Trinity Church (Manhattan) (1868–69) and the first rector of the Church of the Holy Cross, Warrensburg, New York, from 1869 to 1873. He achieved national prominence during his long tenure (1879-1914) as rector of the former Christ Church, Elizabeth, New Jersey (burned January 16, 1988), where he introduced ritualistic practices then uncommon in the Episcopal Church: a "full choral Mass" in 1879, a processional cross (1884), candles on the altar (1885), red cassocks for acolytes (1888), and the wearing of a cope during Evensong (1904).

He was a member of Psi Upsilon, the Catholic Clerical Union, the American Church Union, the Anglican and Eastern Churches Association, and many other organizations.

== Bibliography ==
- Church Music: An Address in St. Agnes Chapel, New York, before the Faculty and Students of the General Theological Seminary (1893)
- The Fortieth Anniversary of the Foundation of the Parish of Christ Church, of Elizabeth, N.J., 1893: A Sermon Preached by the Very Rev. Eugene Augustus Hoffman, D.D. on Easter Day, April 2nd; and a Sermon Preached by the Rev. Henry H. Oberly, M.A. on Low Sunday, April 9th (1893) from Project Canterbury
- Systematic Catechizing: Directions and Suggestions for Catechists and Teachers (1896)
- Lessons on the Prayer Book Catechism for the Use of Children (1898)
- The Testimony of the Prayer Book to the Continuity of the Church (1901)
