= Church of St. Mary the Virgin (Manhattan) =

Church in Manhattan, New York

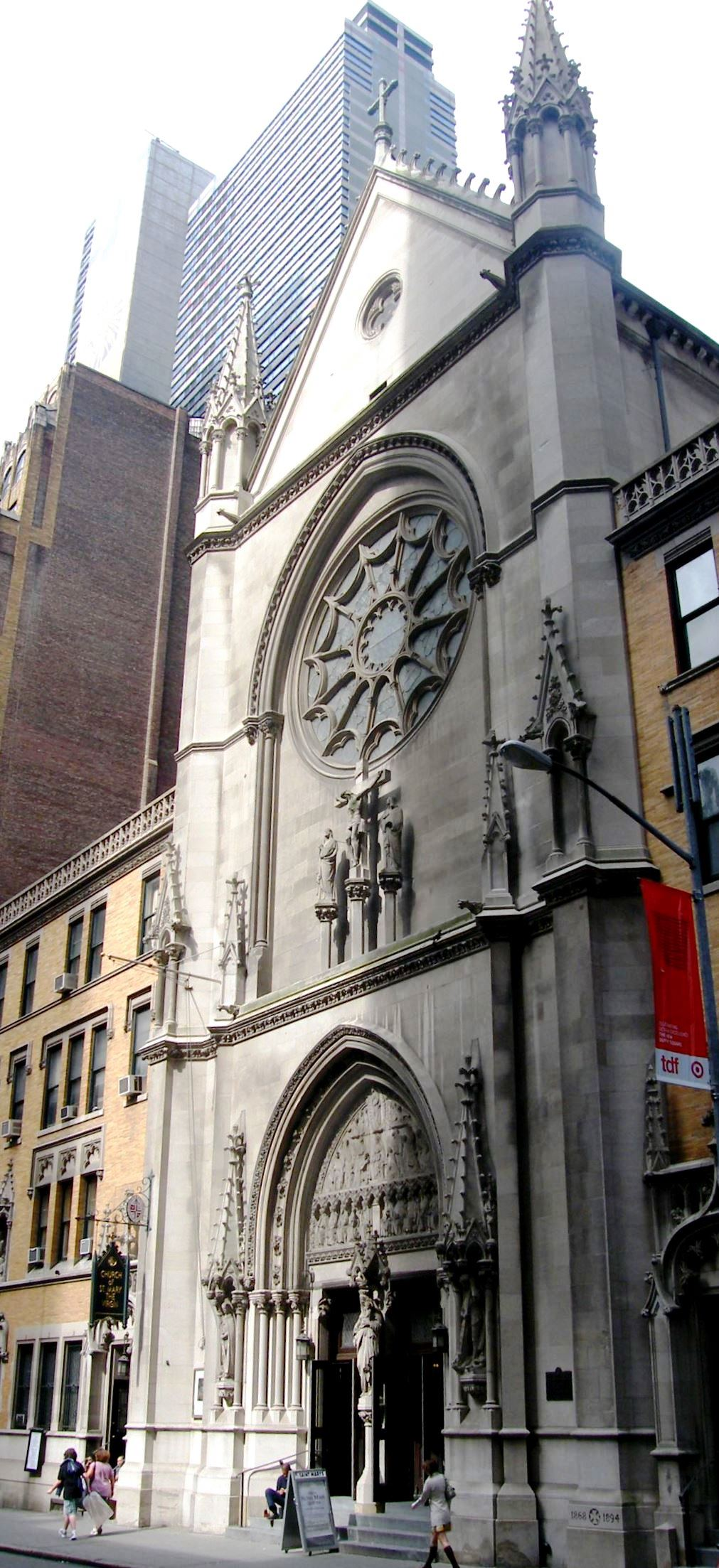
- Church of St. Mary the Virgin
- Location: 145 West 46th Street, between 6th & 7th Avenues, Manhattan, New York City
- Country: United States
- Denomination: Episcopal Church
- Churchmanship: Anglo-Catholic
- Website: www.smokymarys.org

History
- Founded: 1868; 158 years ago
- Dedication: St. Mary

Architecture
- Architect(s): Napoleon LeBrun & Sons, Pierre Le Brun, architect-in-charge
- Architectural type: Church
- Style: French Gothic
- Completed: 1895

Clergy
- Bishop: Matthew Heyd
- Rector: Sammy Wood
- Church of St. Mary the Virgin Complex
- U.S. National Register of Historic Places
- New York State Register of Historic Places
- New York City Landmark
- Location: 133-145 W. 46th St. & 136-144 W. 47th St. Manhattan, New York City
- Coordinates: 40°45′30″N 73°59′1″W
- Built: 1894-95
- Architect: Napoleon LeBrun & Sons, Pierre Le Brun, architect-in-charge
- Architectural style: French Gothic
- NRHP reference No.: 90000606
- NYSRHP No.: 06101.002463
- NYCL No.: 1562

Significant dates
- Added to NRHP: April 16, 1990
- Designated NYSRHP: October 26, 1989
- Designated NYCL: December 19, 1989

The Church of Saint Mary the Virgin is an Episcopal church of the Anglo-Catholic tradition in Midtown Manhattan, New York City, which is part of the Episcopal Diocese of New York of the Episcopal Church in the United States of America. The church complex is located in the heart of Times Square at 133–145 West 46th Street, with other buildings of the complex at 136–144 West 47th Street, between Sixth and Seventh Avenues. It is colloquially known as "Smoky Mary's" because of the amount of incense used in the services.

Completed in 1895, the church has been called "one of the finest Gothic-inspired designs of New York's late 19th century". It is a New York City landmark and listed on the National Register of Historic Places.

In 2022, it reported 300 members, average attendance of 112, and $600,375 in plate and pledge income. In 2023, it reported 333 members; the 2024 average Sunday attendance (ASA) was 97, with plate and pledge financial support of $646,269.

== History ==
=== Original church ===
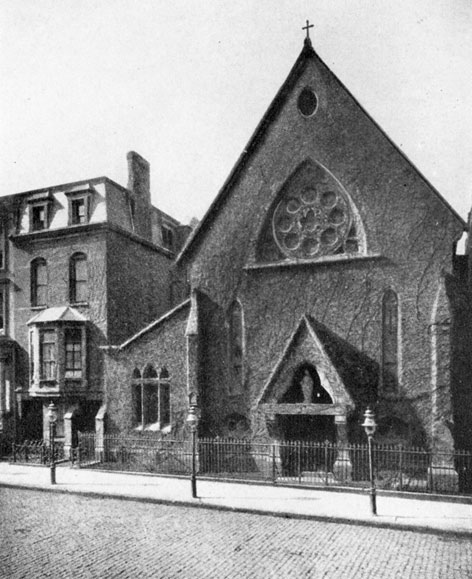
The first Saint Mary's at 228 West 45th Street, the site of the Booth Theatre

The Society of the Free Church of Saint Mary the Virgin in the New York City was incorporated on December 3, 1868. Thomas McKee Brown wanted to build a church in New York City dedicated to expressing the full witness of Catholic thought in ritual and teaching within the Episcopal Church. A year after his ordination, Brown brought his plan to the Bishop of New York, Horatio Potter, who suggested that a church was needed near Longacre Square – which was renamed Times Square in 1905 – on the west side of what is now Midtown. John Jacob Astor gave three lots on West 45th Street between Seventh and Eighth Avenues, "stipulating that the Church should be free, and positively orthodox in management and working."

On April 6, 1868, the cornerstone was laid for the first church, located at 228 West 45th Street, which is today the site of the Booth Theatre. The rector and trustees named the church for the Blessed Virgin Mary. The first church was designed by William T. Hallett, and was dedicated on December 8, 1870, the Feast of the Conception of the Blessed Virgin Mary. Potter was unable to officiate at the service, but his place was taken by Horatio Southgate, the Episcopal Church's former missionary bishop to the Ottoman Empire.

After the Episcopalians left the church on West 45th Street, it became the Lutheran Church of the Redeemer and then Fifth Church of Christ, Scientist.

=== New church ===
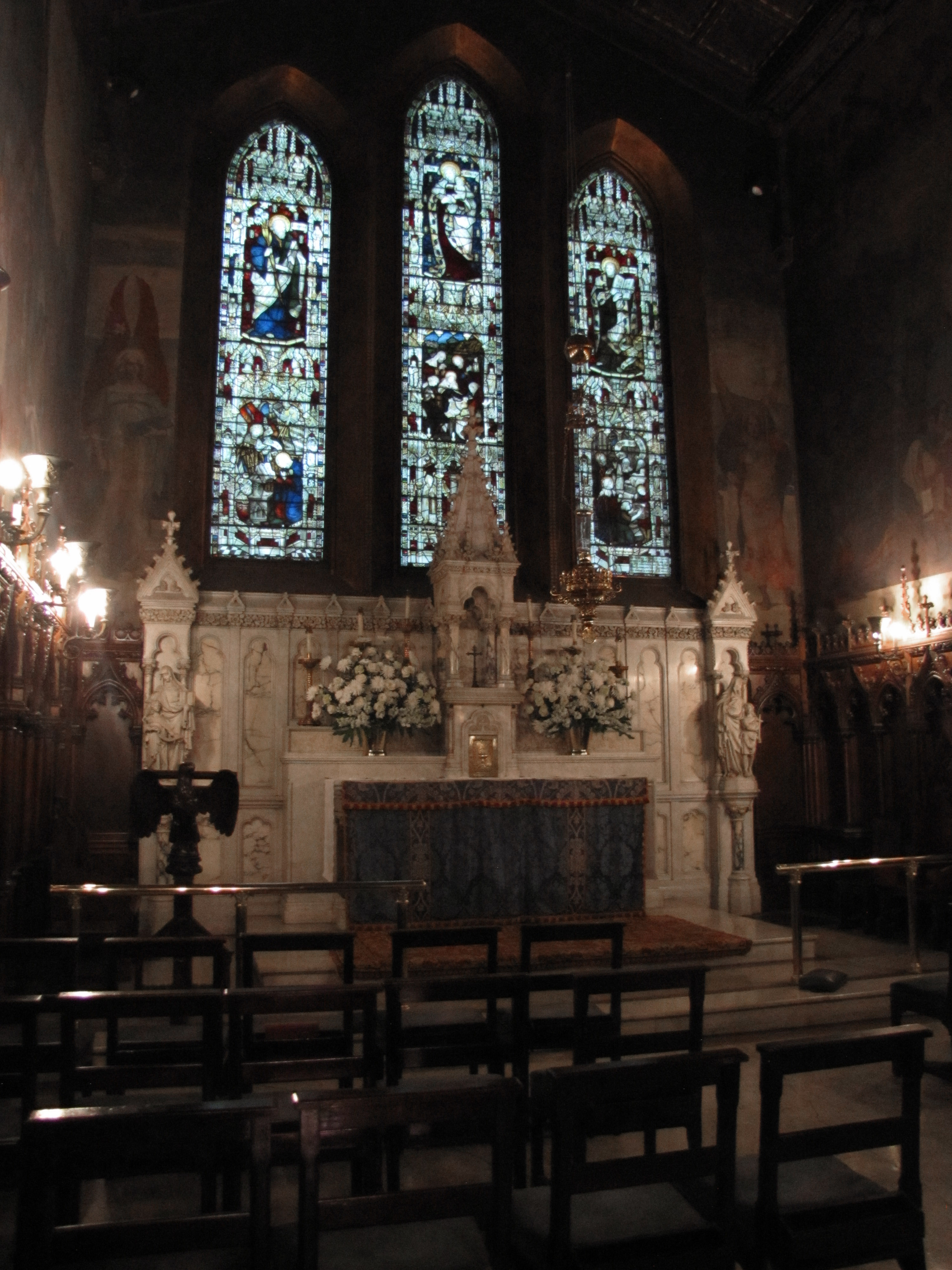
The Lady Chapel at the Church of Saint Mary the Virgin

By 1890, the congregation had outgrown the church on West 45th Street. In 1892, Sara L. Cooke, a member of the parish, left the church a legacy which eventually amounted to $700,000, in addition to real estate. Brown and the other trustees decided to use this legacy to fund a new church on an eight-lot parcel running through from 46th to 47th Streets. The new complex was to include a rectory at the 47th Street end of the lot, a clergy house for curates and assistants and a mission house for the sisters. The style would be French Gothic of the 13th and 14th centuries, with a church seating 800 people.

Erecting this building was a challenge to the architectural firm of Napoleon LeBrun & Sons, with Pierre LeBrun as the lead designer, because of its size and the location. The LeBrun firm had experience working with steel framing, which is buried within the walls, making it the first church in the world built on a concealed steel skeleton, "redefining the conventional methods of church construction." The facade of the church is clad in limestone, while the other buildings in the complex are brick-faced.

The cornerstone for the new church was laid on December 8, 1894, and the church was dedicated in 1895. The completed church was 60 feet (18 m) wide and 180 feet (55 m) long, and the nave was 80 feet (24 m) from floor to ceiling and 46 feet (14 m) wide. The chancel, at the north end of the building, was 48 feet (15 m) deep, terminating with the marble high altar moved from the former church. Complementing LeBrun's design were many sculptural decorations by J. Massey Rhind.

The church building was designated a New York City landmark in 1989 and added to the National Register of Historic Places in 1990. In 2026, the congregation sold 87,000 square feet (8,100 m^{2}) of the site's unused air development rights to Extell Development Company for $24 million.

== Today ==
Today, Saint Mary's is known for its solemn liturgies and choral and organ music. Solemn High Mass and Solemn Evensong and Benediction are celebrated on Sundays, and Mass is offered daily. Because of the copious use of incense, the church is sometimes referred to as "Smoky Mary's." In 1996–97, the interior of the church was restored by J. Lawrence Jones & Associates, resulting in vivid colors, including cobalt blue vaulting with gold stars.

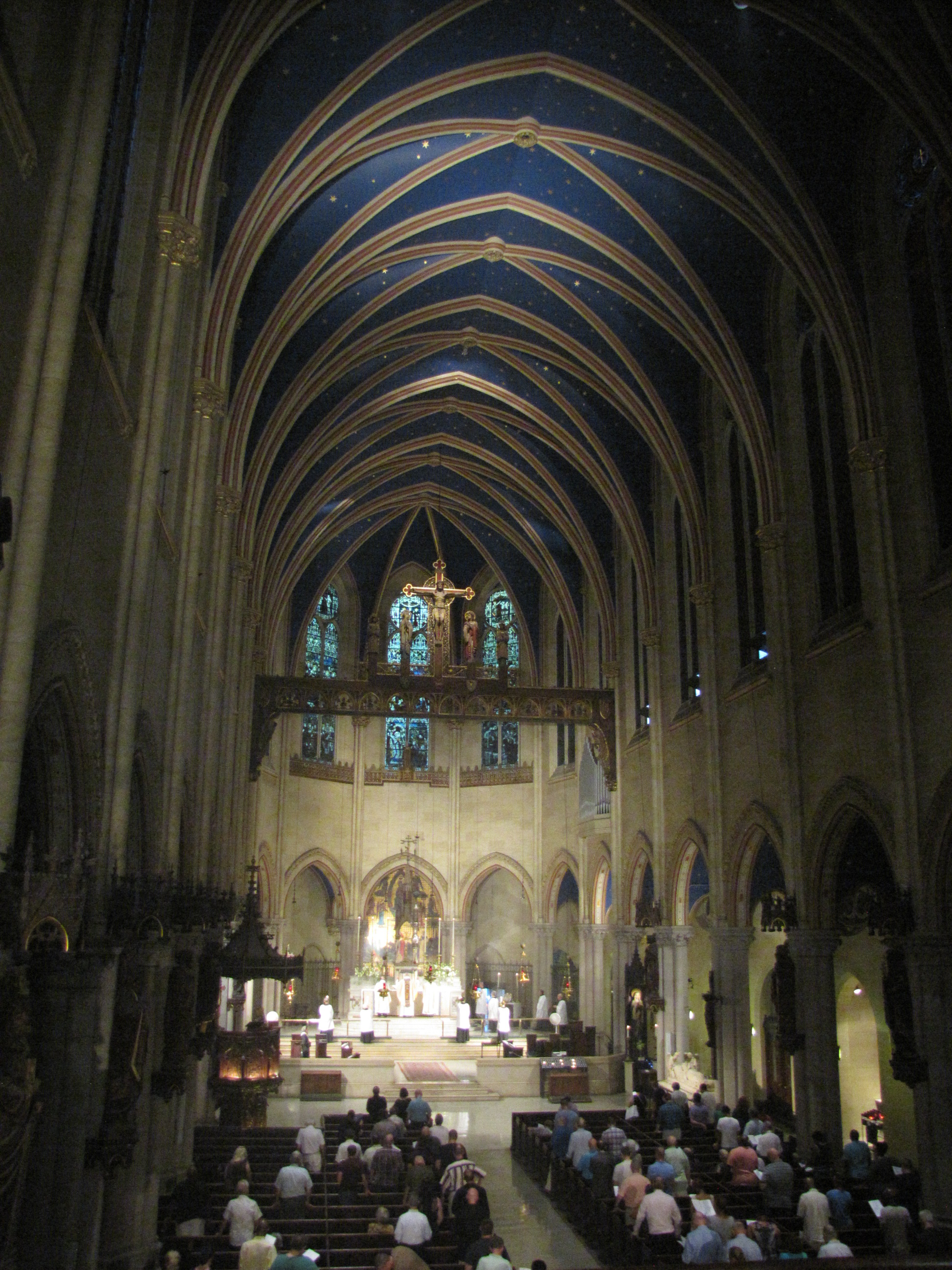
Nave

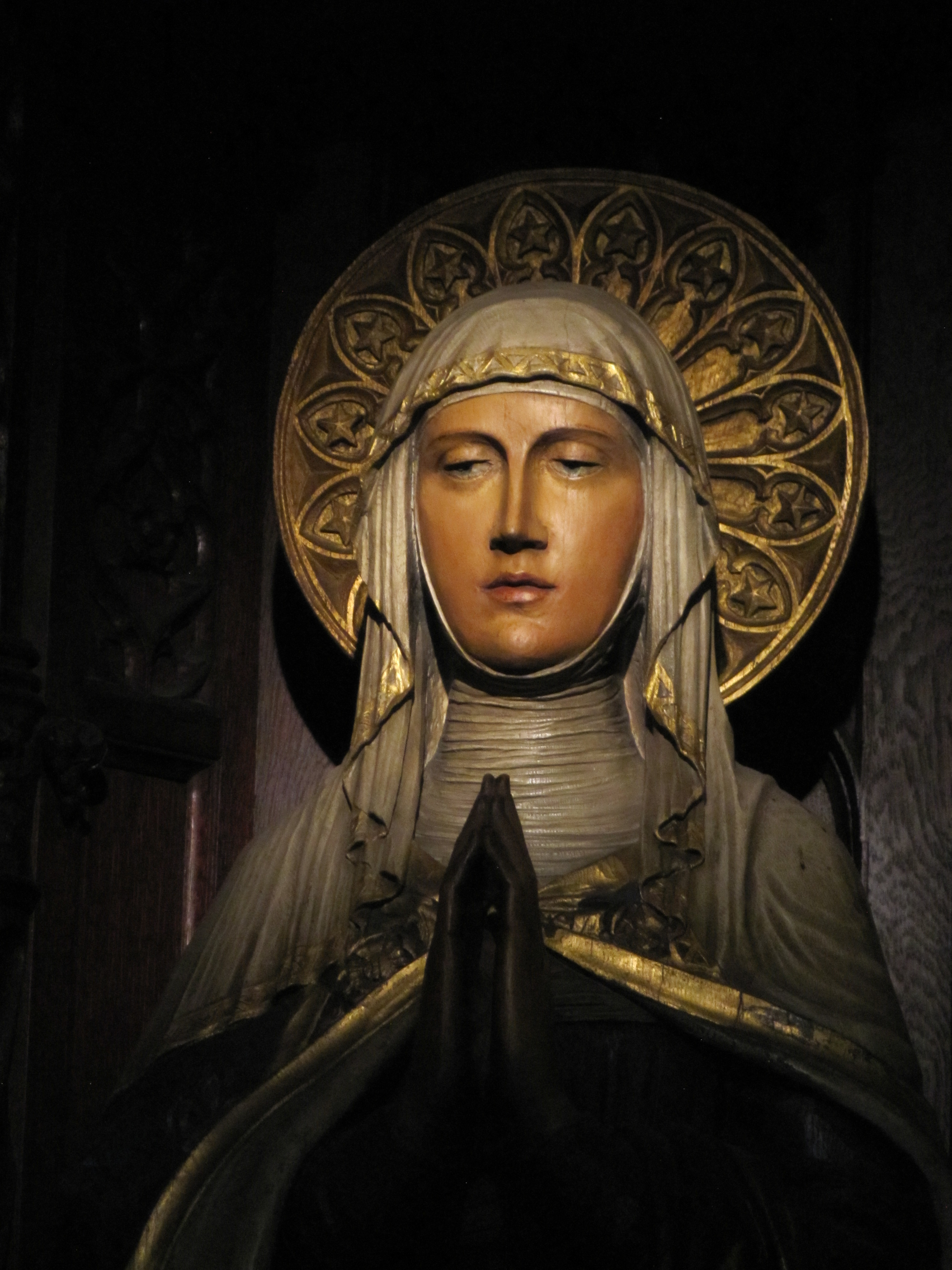
Statue of Our Lady

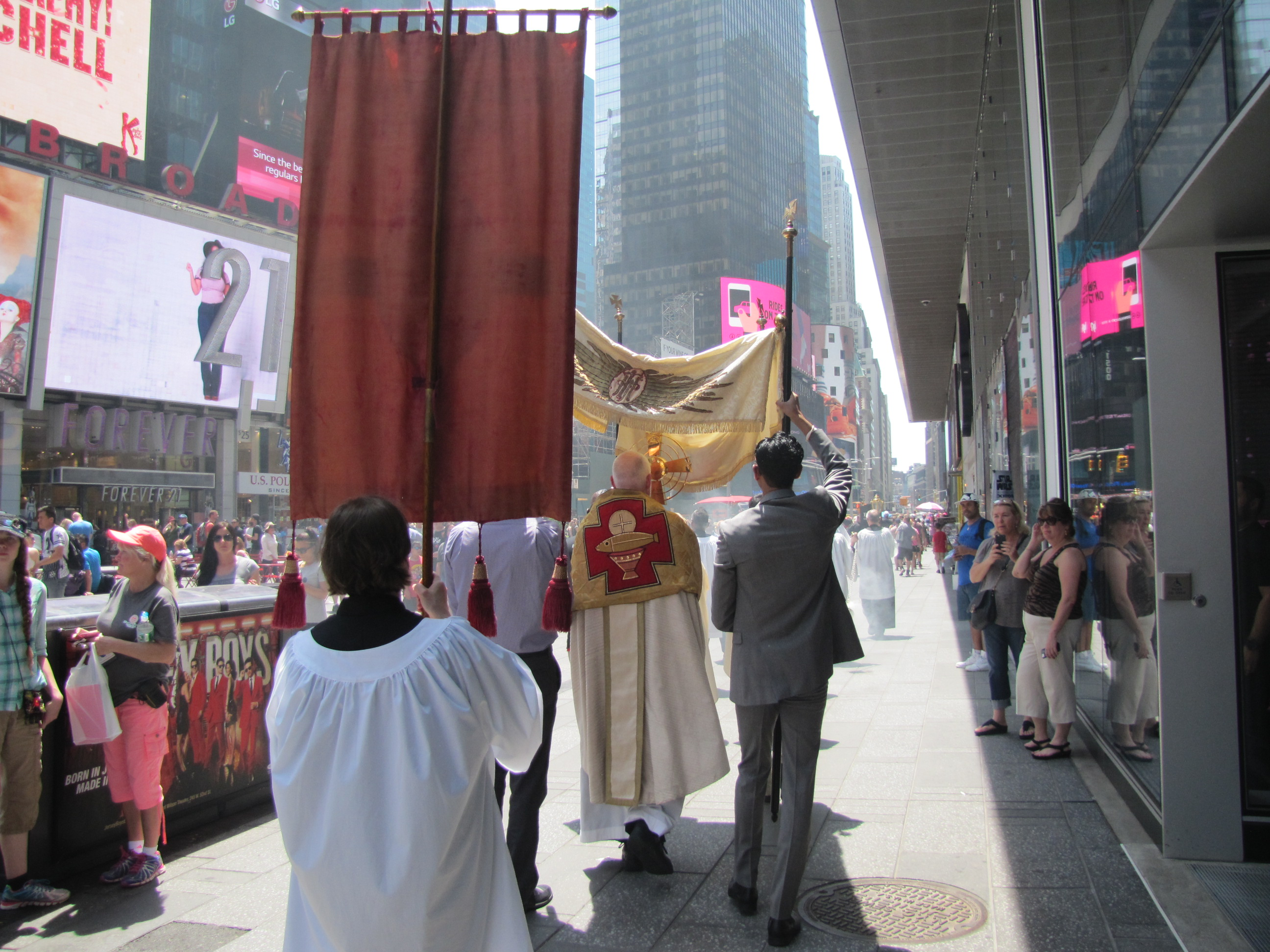
Corpus Christi processional in Times Square

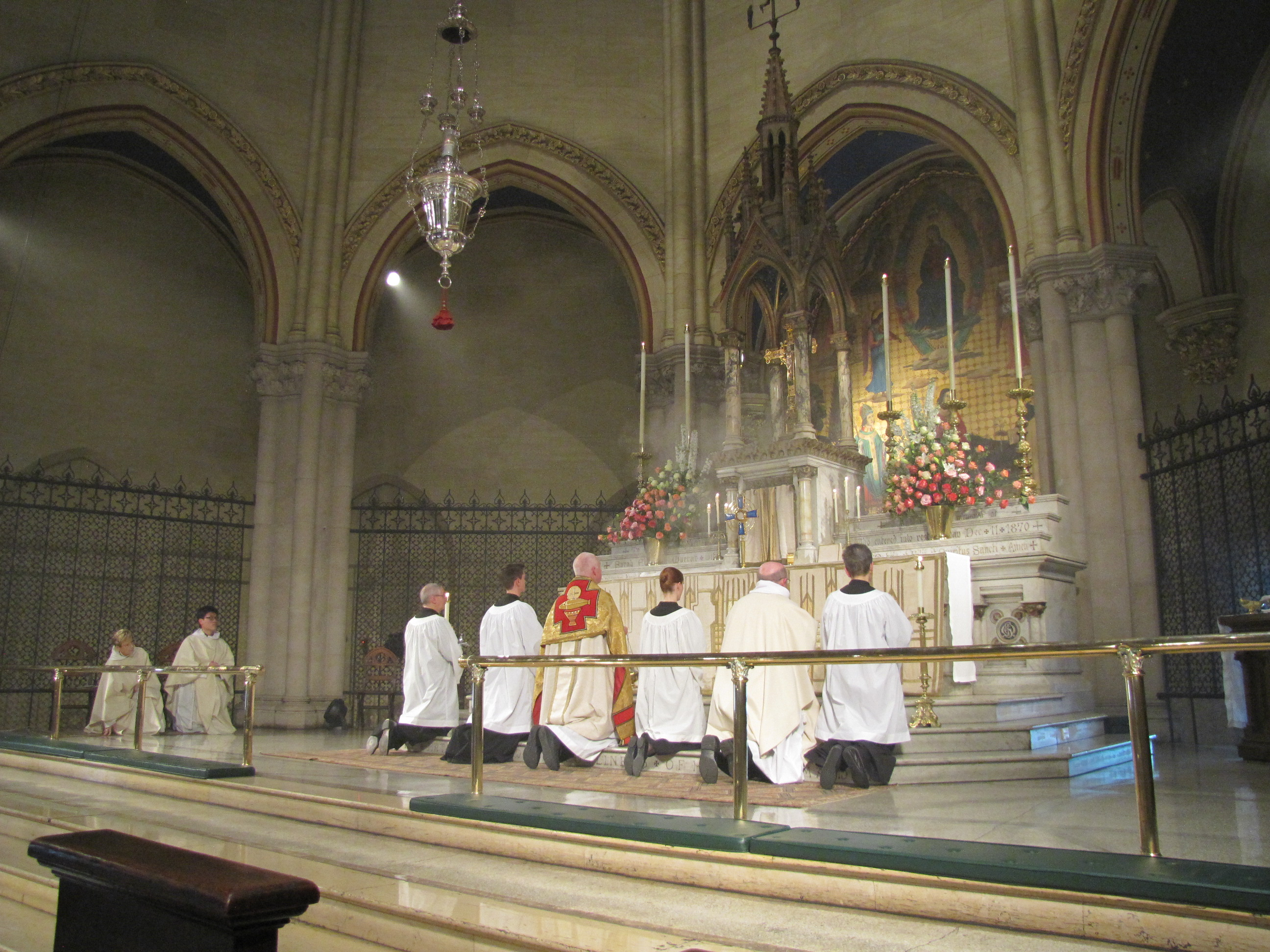
Clergy and acolytes at the high altar

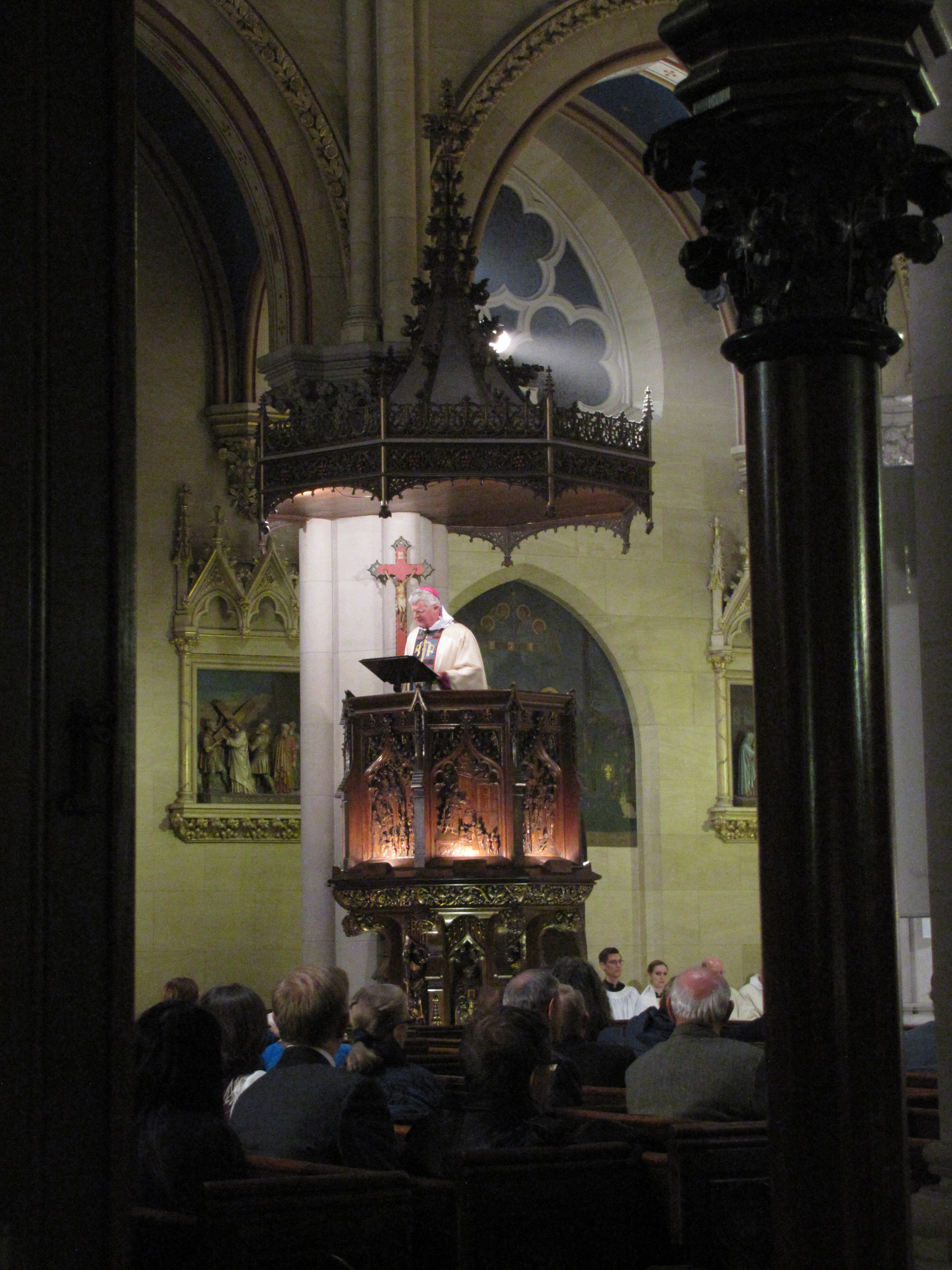
The Most Reverend Frank T. Griswold preaching at Saint Mary's

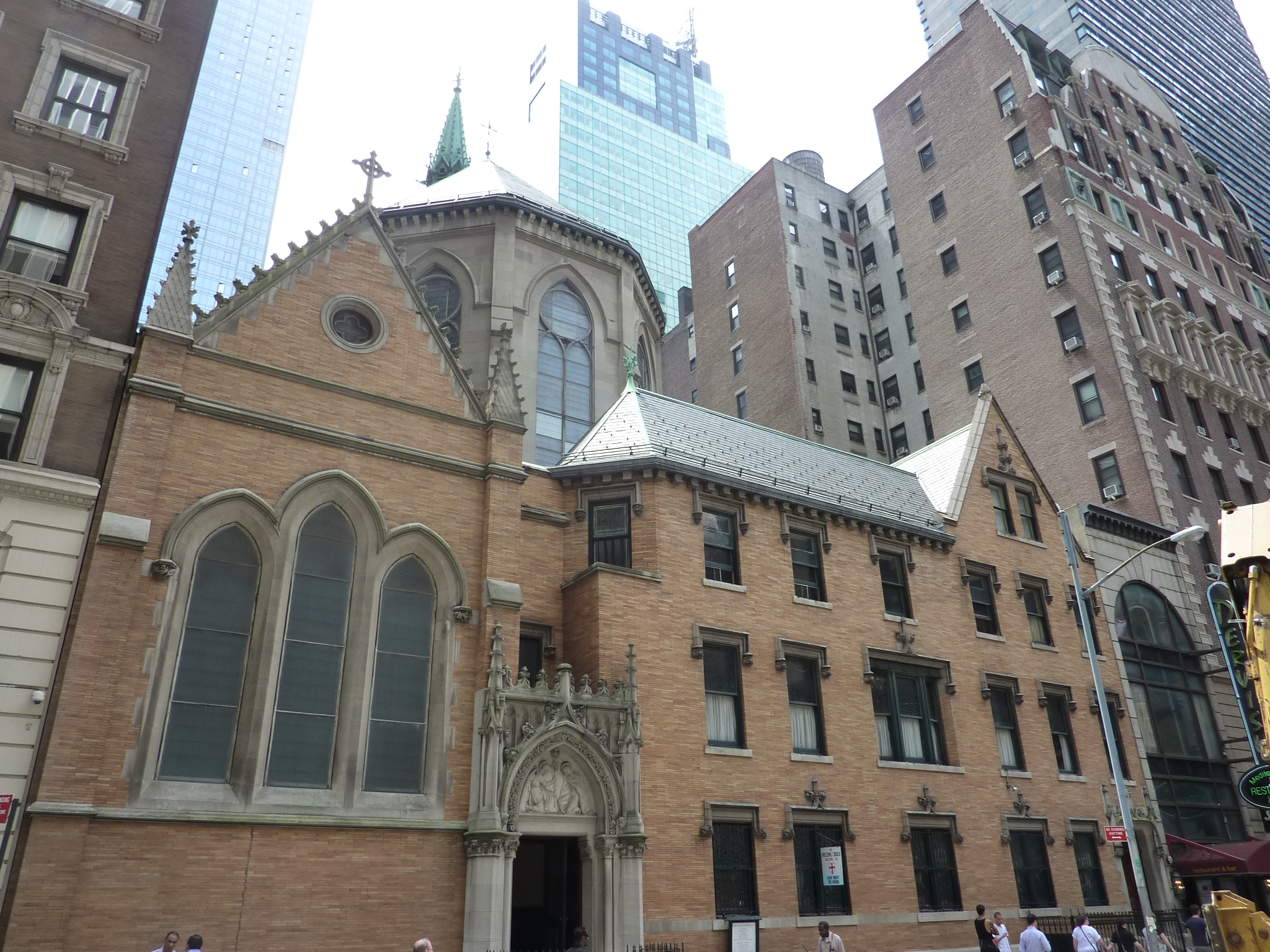
Rear of the church on 47th Street

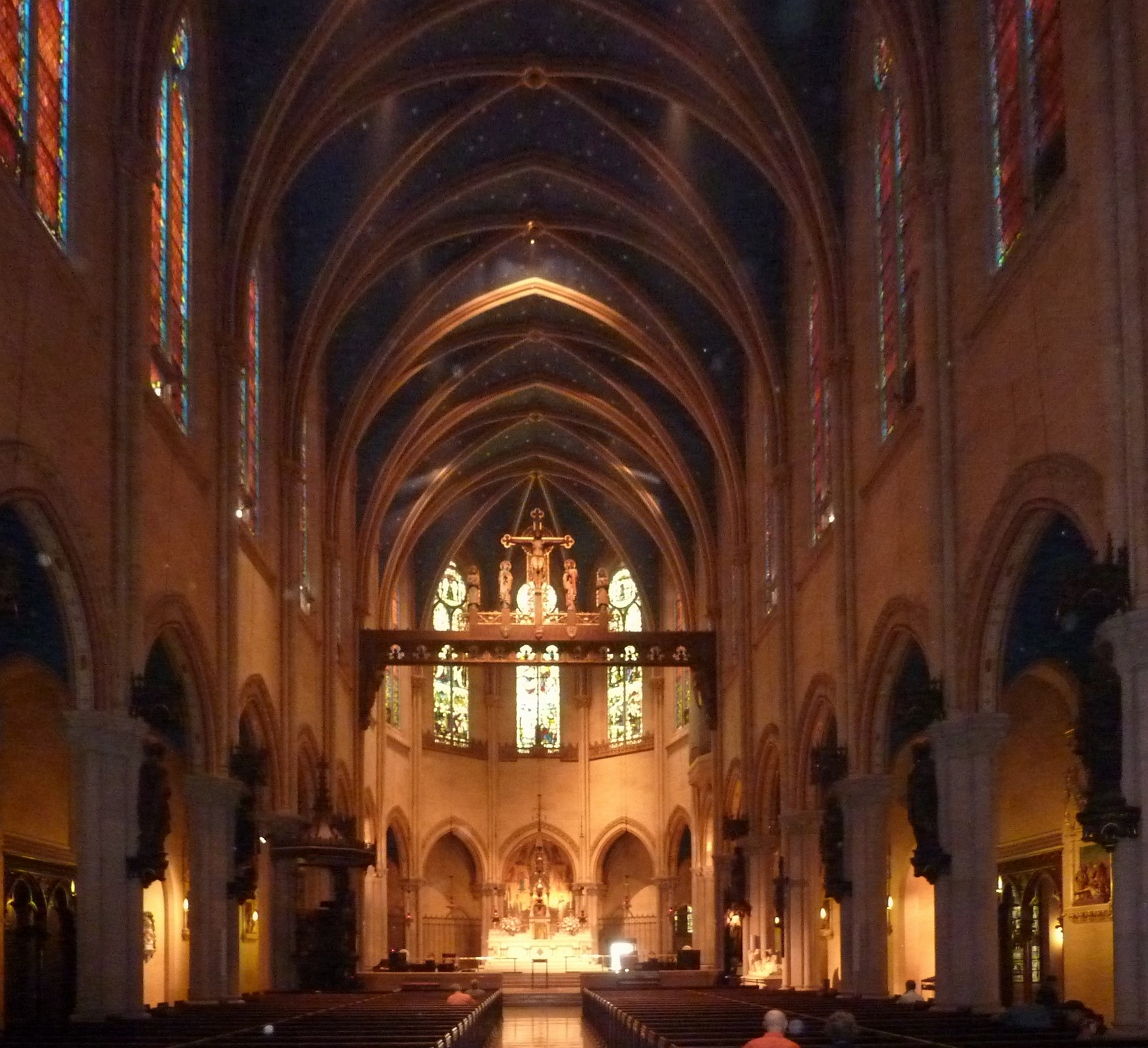
View towards the high altar

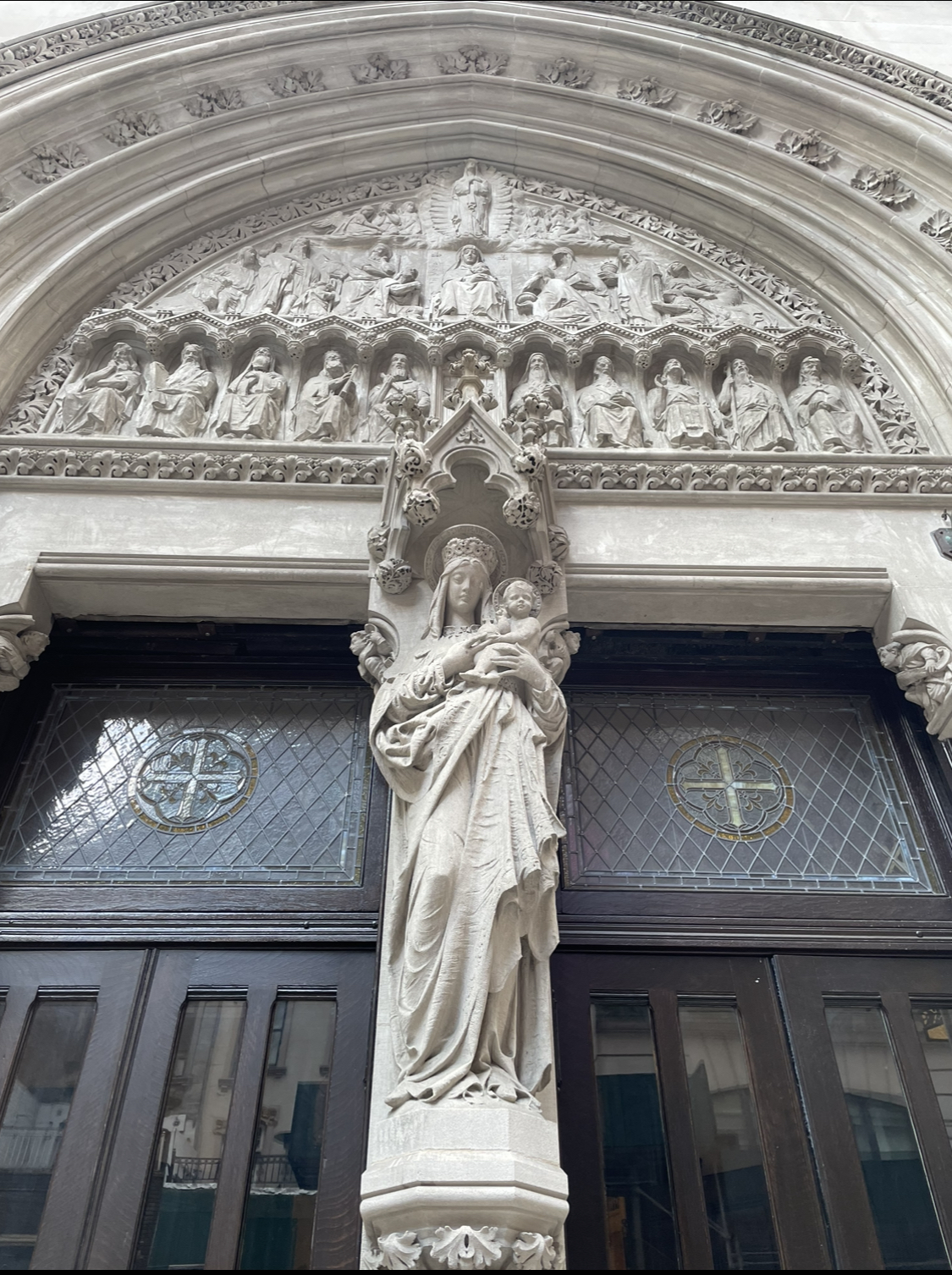
Statue of the Blessed Virgin at the entrance

A clip of Panorama from the Times Building, New York 1905, Church of St. Mary the Virgin near Times Square

== Music ==
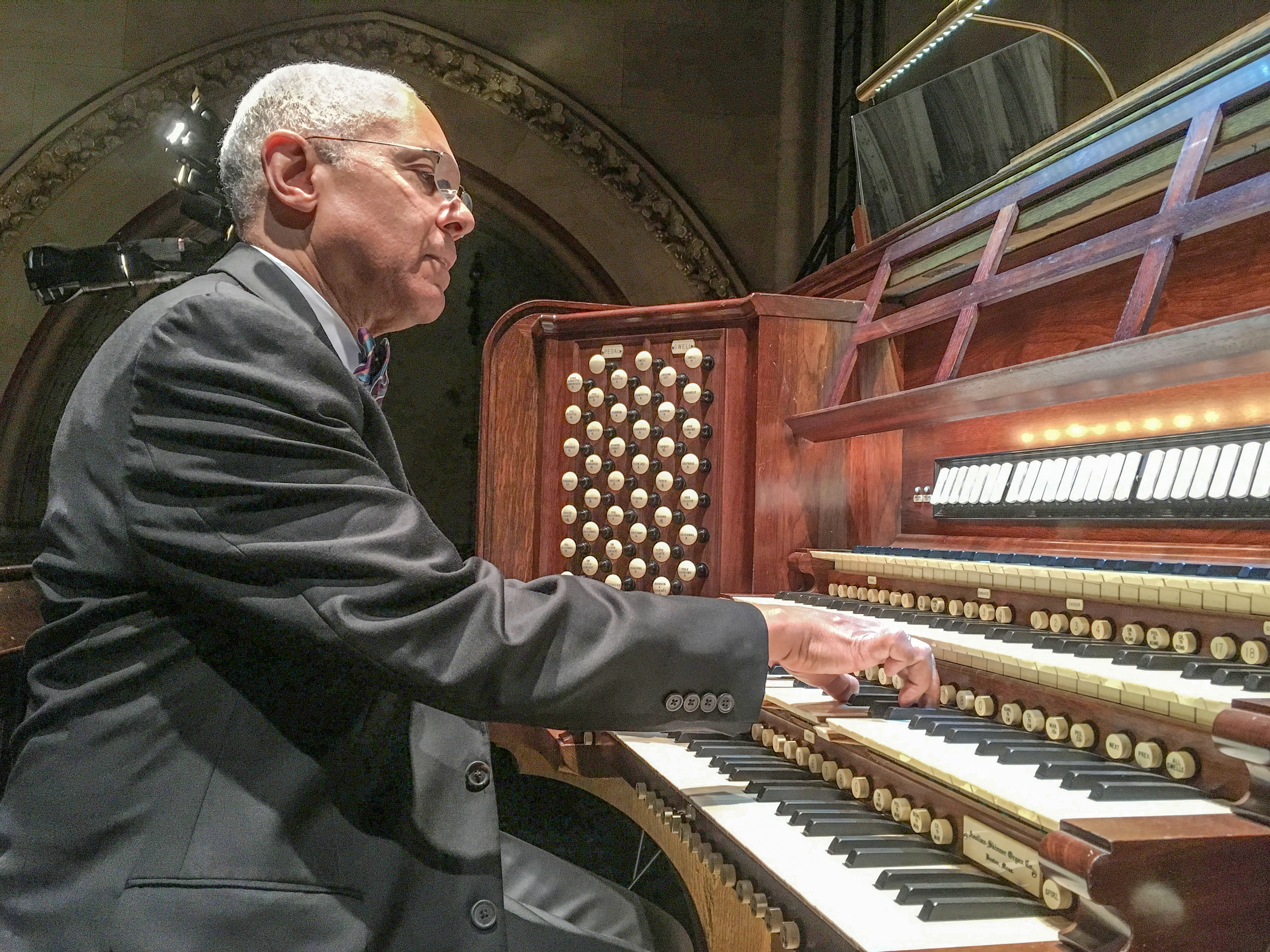
David Hurd, the church's organist and music director

The choir of the Church of Saint Mary the Virgin is a professional ensemble that sings music for the liturgy. At each Solemn Mass, the plainchant propers are sung in the original Latin. The choir's repertoire of Masses and motets stretches from the Middle Ages to works by living composers.

A number of musicians have served as organist and music director at the parish, among them McNeil Robinson, Kyler Brown, Christopher Babcock, Robert McCormick, James Kennerley, and Simon Whalley. The current organist and music director is David Hurd.

== See also ==
- List of New York City Designated Landmarks in Manhattan from 14th to 59th Streets
- National Register of Historic Places listings in Manhattan from 14th to 59th Streets
- High church
- Oxford Movement
- Donald L. Garfield
- Grieg Taber
- Granville M. Williams, SSJE Rector, 1930–1939
