= Ashmont Hill =

- Origin: Boston, Massachusetts
- Genres: CCM, gospel, urban contemporary gospel, worship
- Years active: 2008–2018
- Labels: Comin Atcha, Axiom
- Members: Deborah Bullock; Wil Bullock; April Joy Mtyora; Phil Thompson

Ashmont Hill was an American urban contemporary gospel group from Boston, Massachusetts. The group consists of four members, Deborah Bullock, Wil Bullock, April Joy Mtyora, and Phil Thompson. In 2008, the group broke through on the Billboard magazine charts with their album Ashmont Hill that was released on May 13, 2008. They released Your Masterpiece in 2010, and it charted on the Billboard magazine Gospel Albums chart. The band released The Maze in 2013, yet this did not place on any Billboard magazine charts.

== Background ==
The Boston, Massachusetts-based urban contemporary gospel quartet Ashmont Hill started in 2008, and they are made up of four members, Deborah Bullock, Wil Bullock, April Joy Mtyora, and Phil Thompson.

== History ==
The quartet released Ashmont Hill with Comin Atcha Music, Inc. in 2008. This was their breakthrough release upon the Billboard magazine charts, and it placed on the Christian Albums chart at No. 16, Gospel Albums chart at No. 10, and No. 47 on the Independent Albums chart. Their second album, Your Masterpiece, released in 2010 by Axiom Records. It charted on the Gospel Albums chart at No. 5. The subsequent album, The Maze, was released in 2013, yet this time it did not chart. In 2018 the group announced their breakup to pursue other opportunities individually.

== Members ==
- Deborah Bullock
- Wil Bullock
- April Joy Mtyora
- Phil Thompson

== Discography ==
=== Studio albums ===
List of studio albums, with selected chart positions
Title	Album details	Peak chart positions		
Title	Album details	US Chr	US Gos	US Ind
Ashmont Hill	Released: 2008; Label: Comin Atcha; CD, digital download	16	10	47
Your Masterpiece	Released: 2010; Label: Axiom; CD, digital download	–	5	–
The Maze	Released: 2013; Label: Independent; CD, digital download	–	–	–
