= St. Ignatius of Antioch Church (New York City) =

Church in Manhattan, New York

- St. Ignatius of Antioch Episcopal Church
- U.S. National Register of Historic Places
- New York State Register of Historic Places
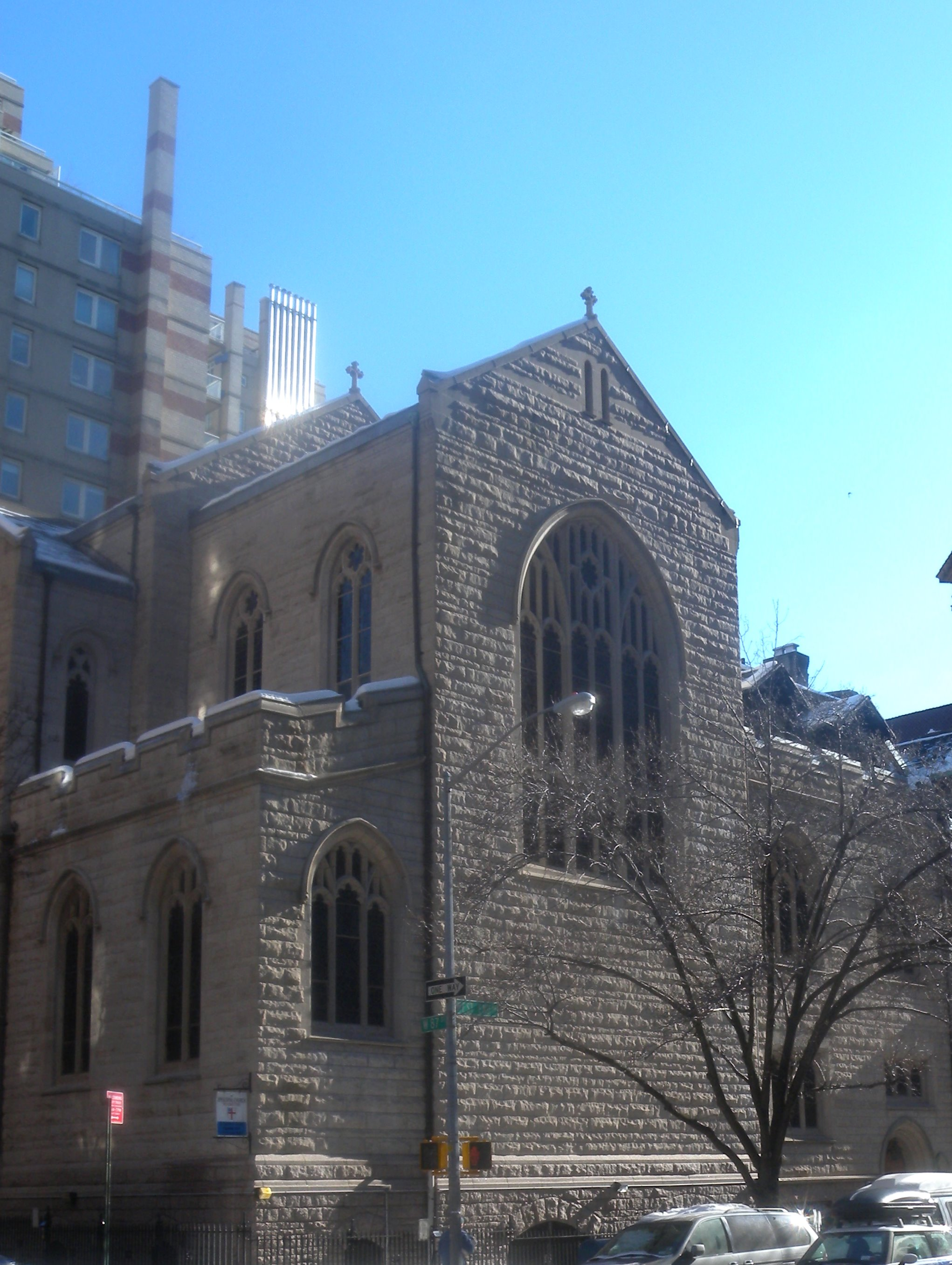

- Location within New York City Location within New York Location within the United States
- Location: 552 W. End Ave., New York, New York
- Coordinates: 40°47′21″N 73°58′38″W
- Area: less than one acre
- Built: 1903
- Architect: Haight, Charles C.; Cram & Ferguson
- Architectural style: Late Gothic Revival
- NRHP reference No.: 99001442
- NYSRHP No.: 06101.010534

Significant dates
- Added to NRHP: November 30, 1999
- Designated NYSRHP: September 22, 1999

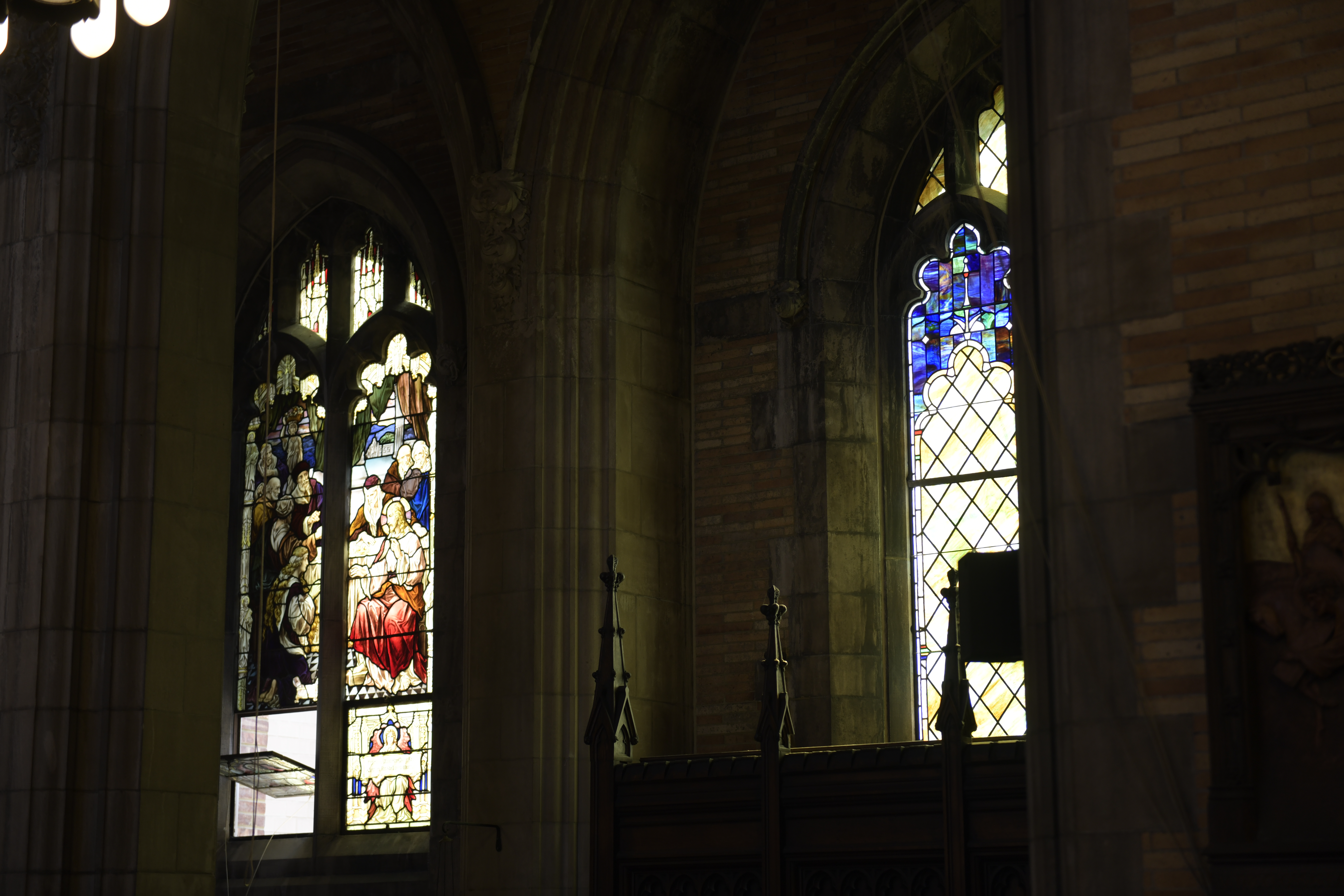
Stained glass windows on the south wall of the nave at the east end

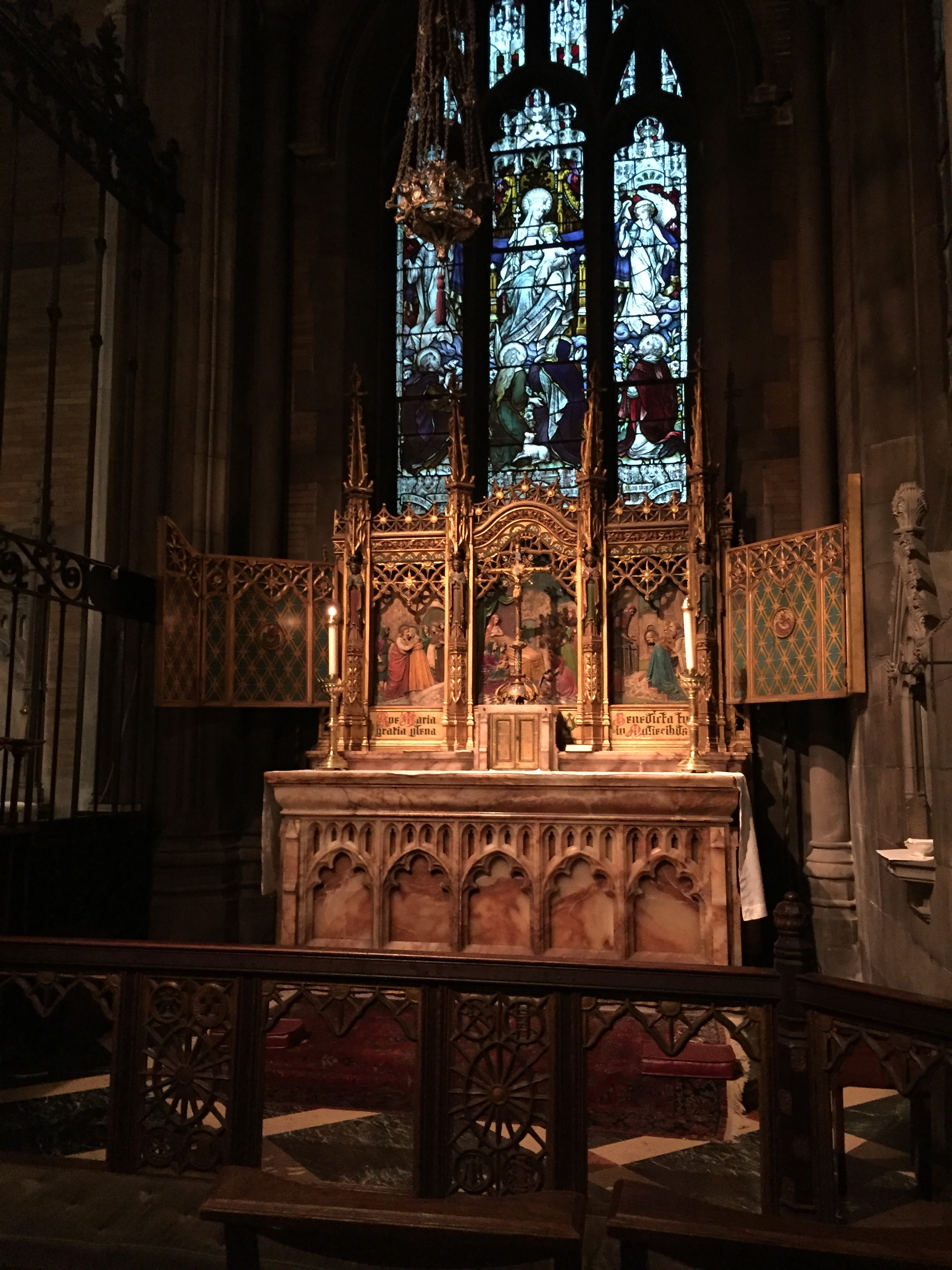
Altar of the Lady Chapel

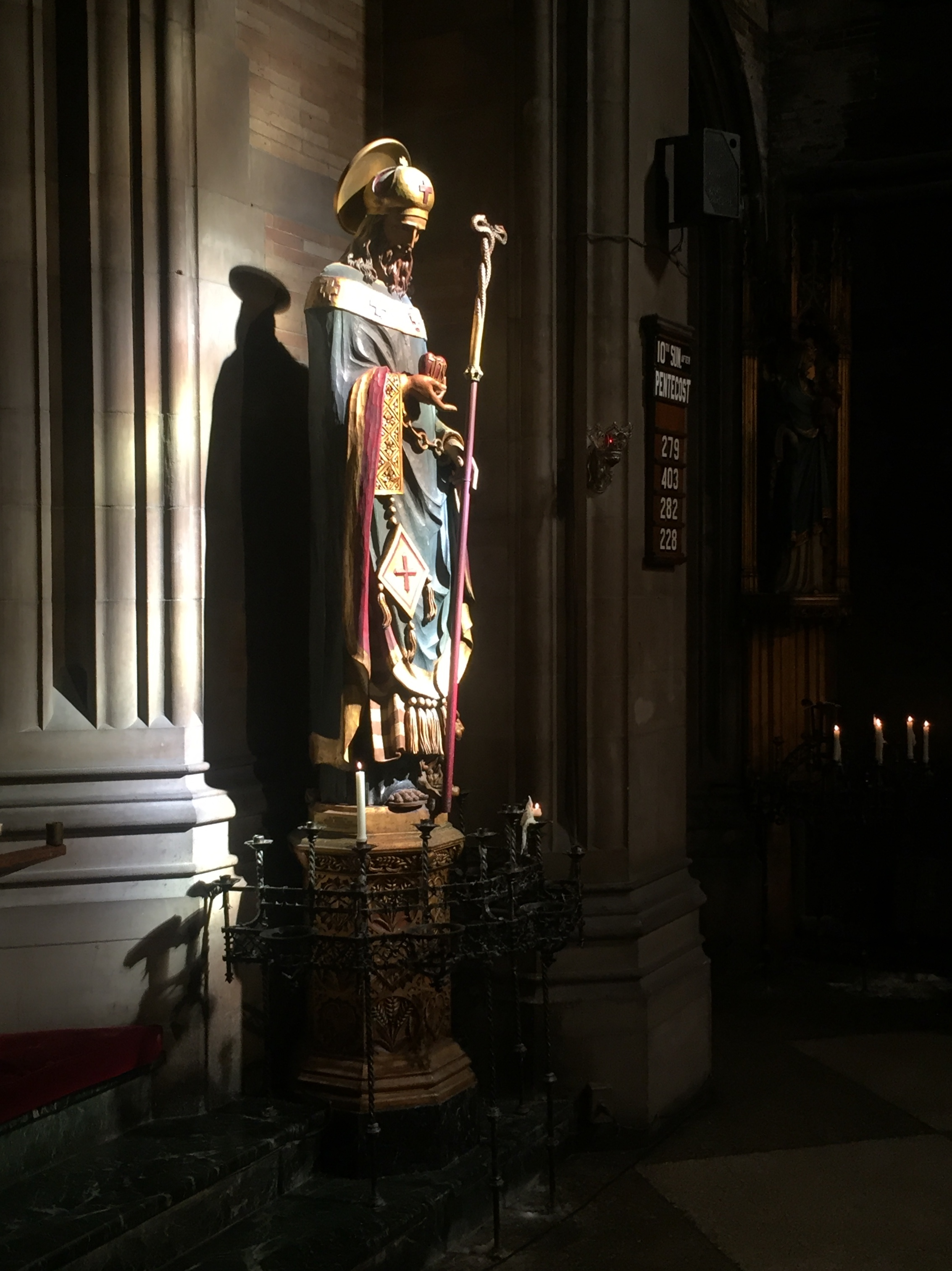
Statue of St. Ignatius of Antioch

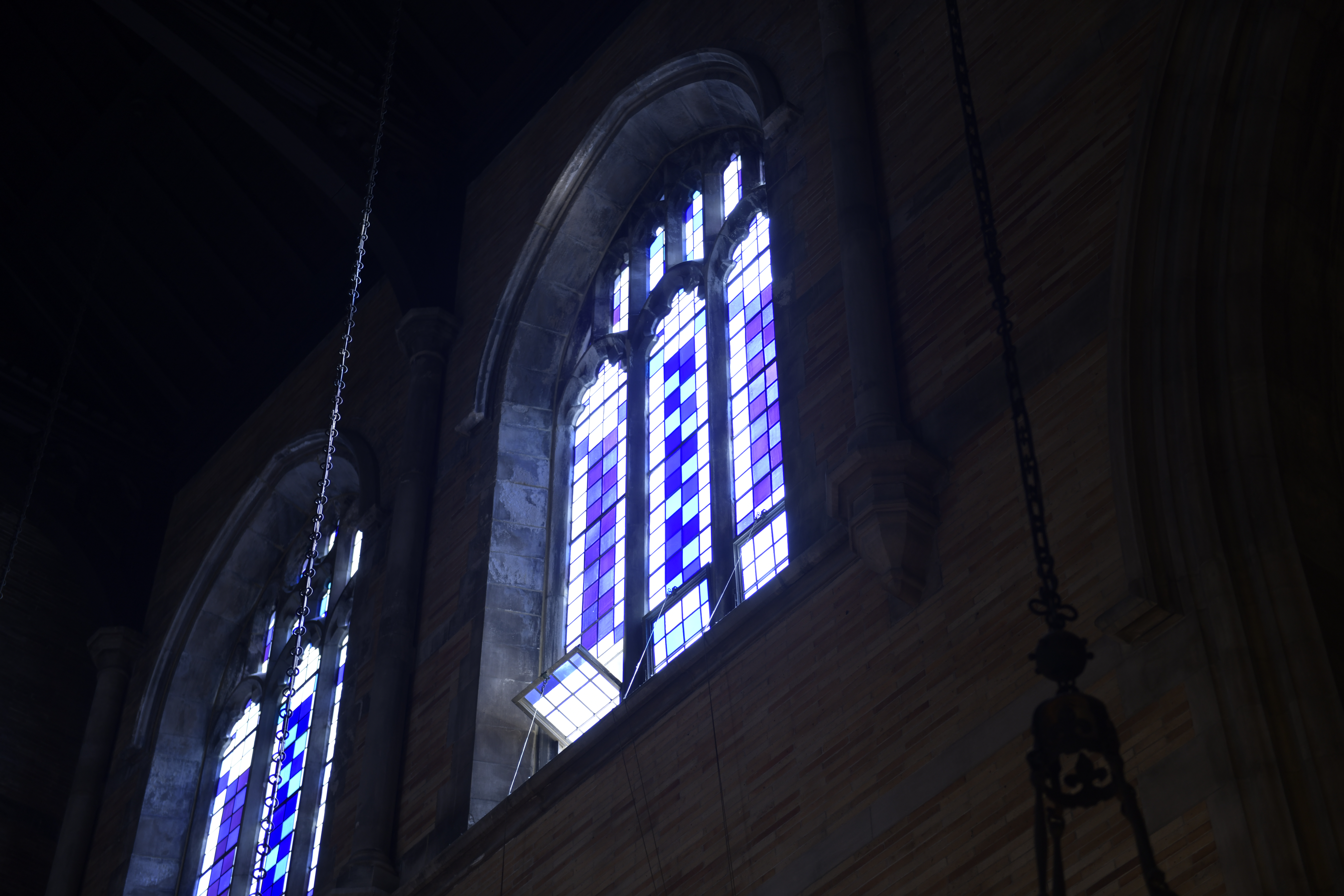
Clerestory windows on the south wall of the nave

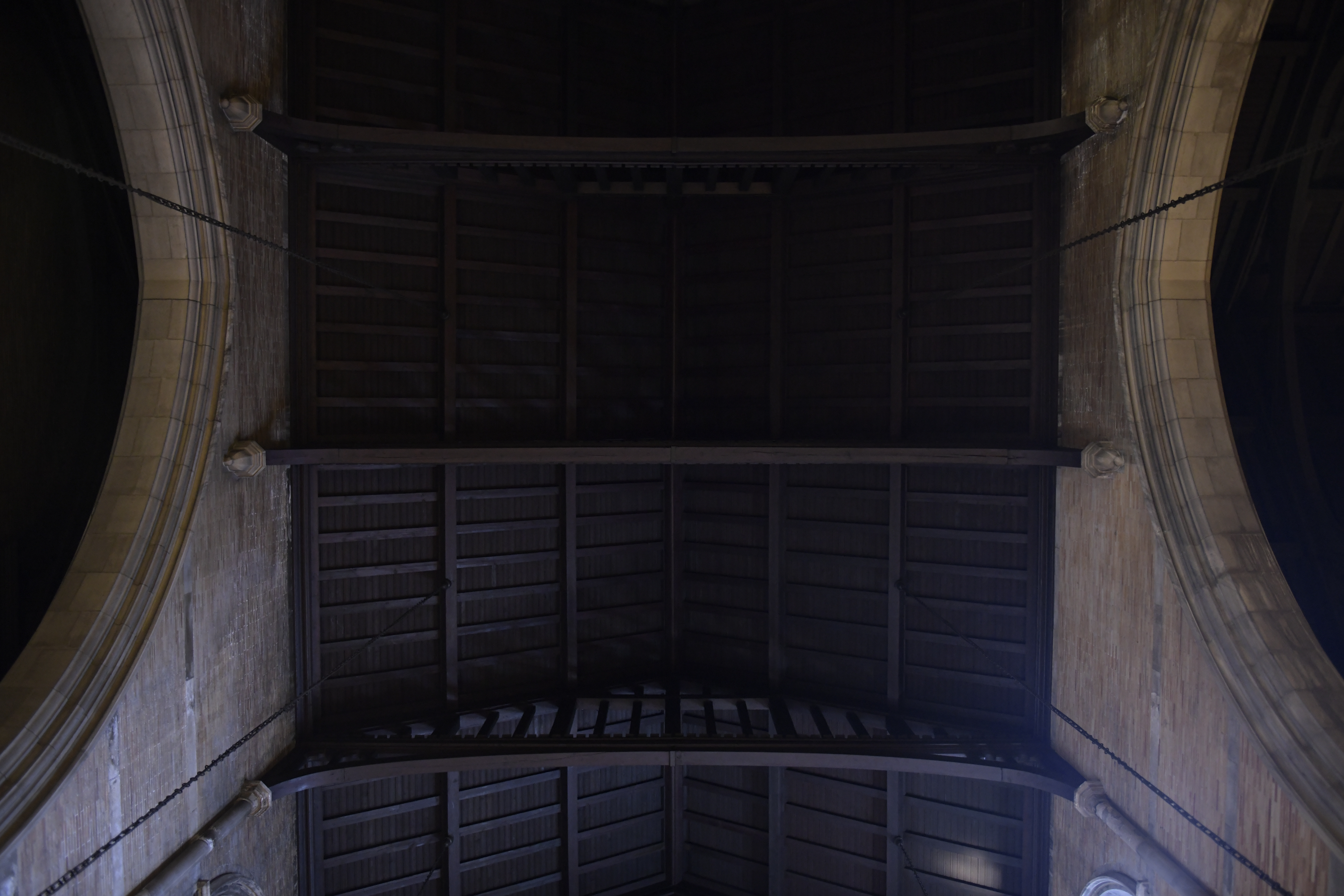
Wood beam ceiling

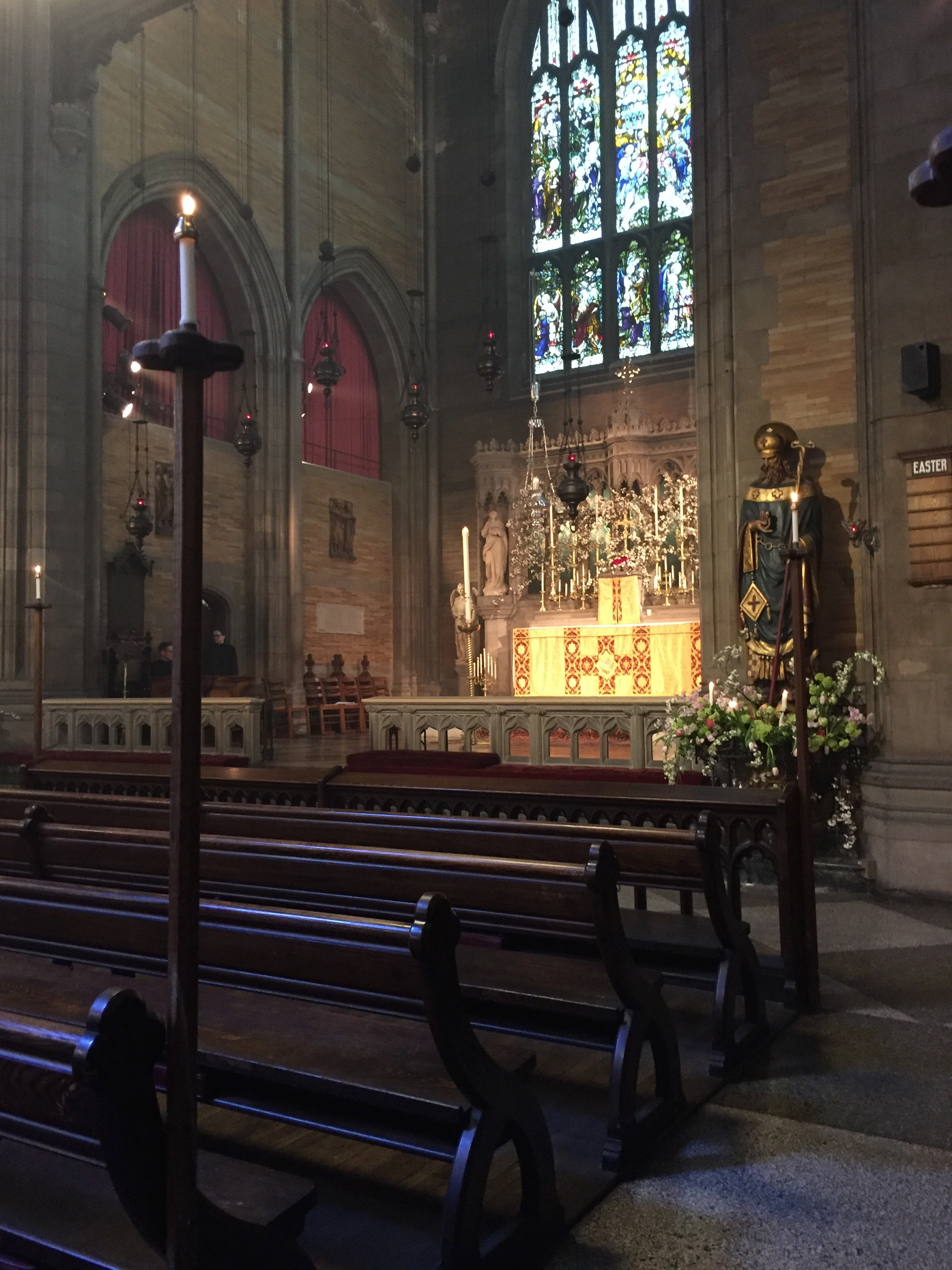
St. Ignatius of Antioch Episcopal Church at Easter

St. Ignatius of Antioch Episcopal Church is a historic Episcopal church, located at 552 West End Avenue, on the southeast corner of 87th Street, in Manhattan's Upper West Side neighborhood. It was built in 1903 and added to the National Register of Historic Places in 1999.

The church reported 265 members in 2015 and 197 members in 2023; no membership statistics were reported in 2024 parochial reports. Plate and pledge income reported for the congregation in 2024 was $299,605 with average Sunday attendance (ASA) of 64 persons.

== History ==
The congregation was founded in 1871 by the Rev. Dr. Ferdinand C. Ewer, as part of the Anglo-Catholic movement. The rather unusual choice of titular saint, the first-century bishop and martyr Ignatius of Antioch, seems to have been motivated by Ignatius' emphasis on the centrality of the Eucharist and on the unifying role of the bishop. Ironically, the parish was to have somewhat rocky relations with the bishops of New York in its first several decades due to tensions over its Anglo-Catholic practices.

The parish first met in the former Holy Light Church (New York City) (a parish for the blind), at 437 Seventh Avenue, then in the former St. Paul's Dutch Reformed Church, located at 54-56 West 40th Street and facing what is now Bryant Park, before erecting the present building. The present church, built under the parish's second rector, Arthur Ritchie, was designed to ritualist standards, including features such as a permanent stoup for holy water at the entrance and a built-in confessional. The first services were held in the new building in 1902. The Bishop of New York, the Rt. Rev. Henry Codman Potter, expressed his disapproval of the parish's ritualist tendencies by his absence from the opening; Bishop Charles C. Grafton of Fond du Lac, a noted leader of the Anglo-Catholic party in the Episcopal Church, presided in his stead.

St. Ignatius of Antioch was among the first Anglo-Catholic parishes to welcome the ministry of ordained women. In 1980 the Rev. Ellen Barrett, the first openly gay woman ordained in the Episcopal Church, preached at Good Friday services; she was later invited to become an associate priest of the parish. This move was controversial at the time, and it tended to divide St. Ignatius from many of its sister Anglo-Catholic parishes that were slower to welcome and affirm the ministry of women. Around the same time, the parish moved from using various editions of the Anglican Missal to using Rite I of the 1979 Book of Common Prayer, with the continuation of traditional ritualist features, such as the Angelus, the Asperges, and minor propers chanted in Latin to Gregorian chant tones.

== Architecture ==
St. Ignatius' graceful English Gothic building was completed in 1902 to designs by architect Charles C. Haight, who also built New York's General Theological Seminary. The cruciform interior is made of Roman brick with stone arches carrying a wooden truss roof. The undercroft and several of the subsidiary spaces feature Guastavino tile ceilings. Further enrichment of the interior furnishings was carried out in 1924–1930 under the direction of architect Ralph Adams Cram. These additions include the spire-like cover for the baptismal font, the carved wooden Stations of the Cross, the altarpiece and other furnishings of the Lady Chapel, and polychromed statues of the Blessed Virgin Mary, St. Ignatius, and the Sacred Heart of Jesus.

== Music ==
The church's organ was built in 1966 by Casavant Frères of Québec. In the wake of extensive damage to the instrument caused by the failure of a water tank located above the pipes, the organ was extensively refurbished in 2010–2011. The church is noted for the excellence of its professional choir, which has a particular affinity for the music of the Renaissance. Thanks to its excellent acoustics, the church also plays host to a notable concert series.

== See also ==
- National Register of Historic Places listings in Manhattan from 59th to 110th Streets
