= Parish of All Saints Ashmont =

Historic church in Massachusetts, United States

- All Saints Church
- U.S. National Register of Historic Places
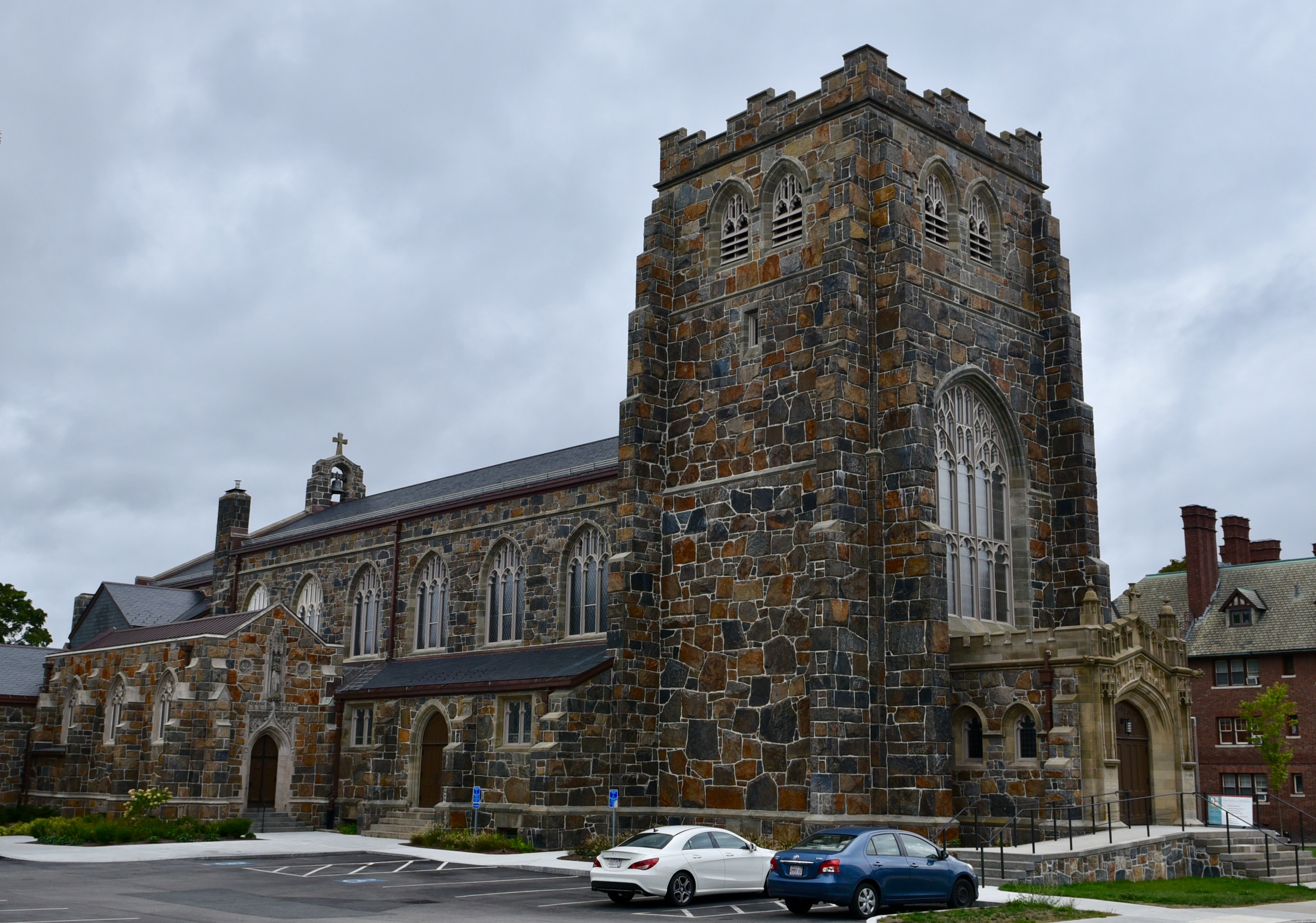

- Location within Massachusetts Location within the United States
- Location: 211 Ashmont Street; Boston, Massachusetts
- Coordinates: 42°17′8.6″N 71°3′48.4″W
- Area: 1.1 acres (0.45 ha)
- Built: 1892
- Architect: Cram, Ralph Adams
- Architectural style: Modern Gothic
- NRHP reference No.: 80000678
- Added to NRHP: June 16, 1980

The Parish of All Saints, Ashmont, is a church of the Episcopal Diocese of Massachusetts located at 209 Ashmont Street in the Dorchester neighborhood of Boston, Massachusetts. Built 1892-1929 for a congregation founded in 1867, it was the first major commission of architect Ralph Adams Cram, a major influence in the development of early 20th-century Gothic church and secular architecture. The church was listed on the National Register of Historic Places in 1980, and is protected by a preservation easement held by Historic New England.

The church reported 365 members in 2021 and 111 members in 2023; no membership statistics were reported in 2024 parochial reports. Plate and pledge income reported for the congregation in 2024 was $207,525 with average Sunday attendance (ASA) of 85 persons. This was a relative decrease on ASA of 136 reported in 2015.

== Architecture ==
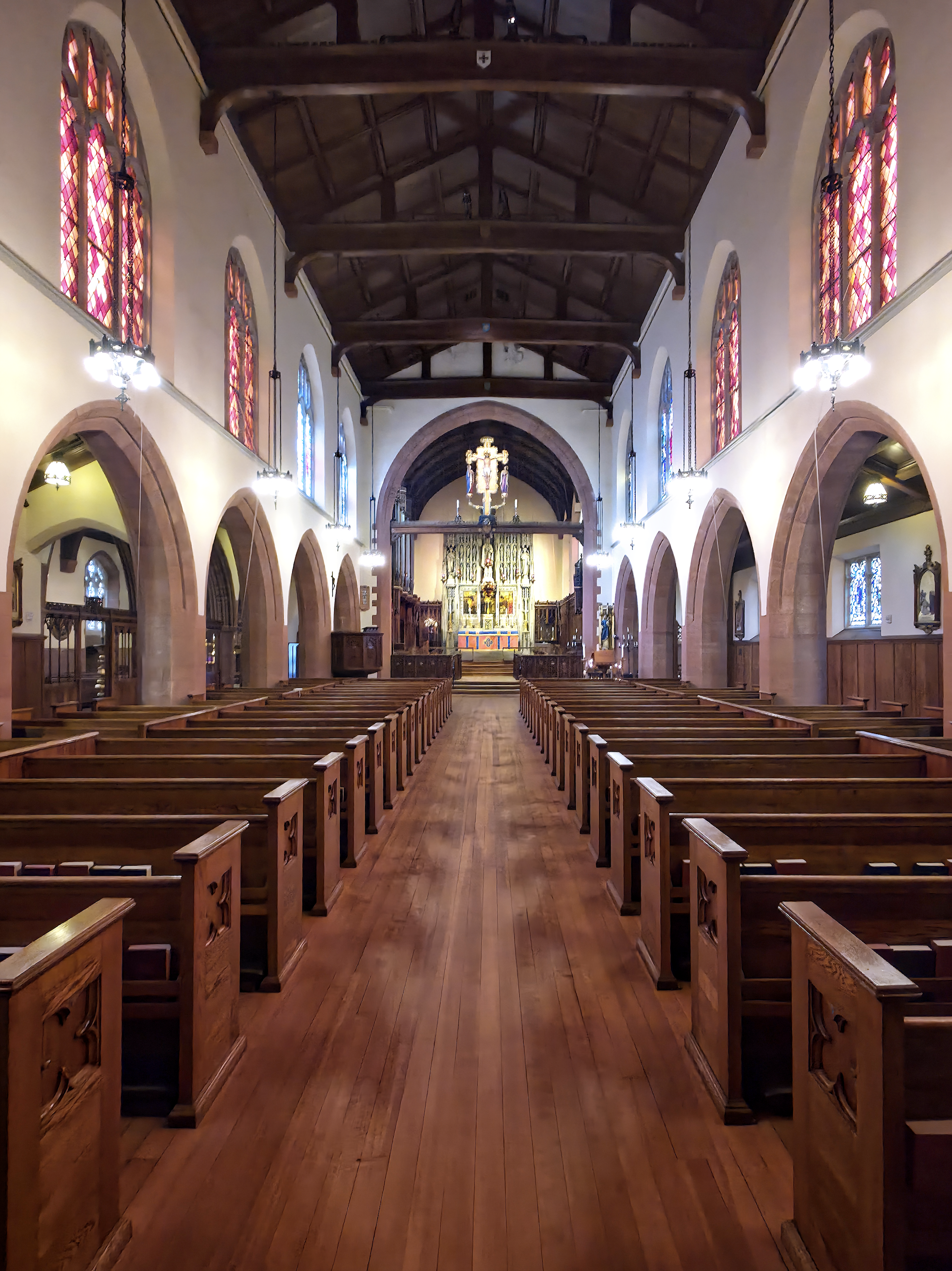
Nave

All Saints is located in southern Dorchester, a short walk from the Ashmont station of the MBTA Red Line. It occupies a parcel bounded on three sides by Ashmont, Bushnell, and Lombard Streets. The main body of the church is essentially a long rectangle, with several small projection the sides, and a larger eastern projection at the southern end, joining it to the parish house. At the northern end is a large square tower with buttressed corners and a parapeted top. The front of the tower has a large stained glass window, below which an extended entrance vestibule projects forward. The church is built out of rough-face Quincy granite, with trim that is a light colored sandstone from Nova Scotia. The interior is richly decorated with Gothic features, and includes wood carvings of Johannes Kirchmayer, stone carvings by John Evans (a noted Welsh sculptor who worked on later Cram projects), and stained glass by Charles Jay Connick, another Cram friend and collaborator.

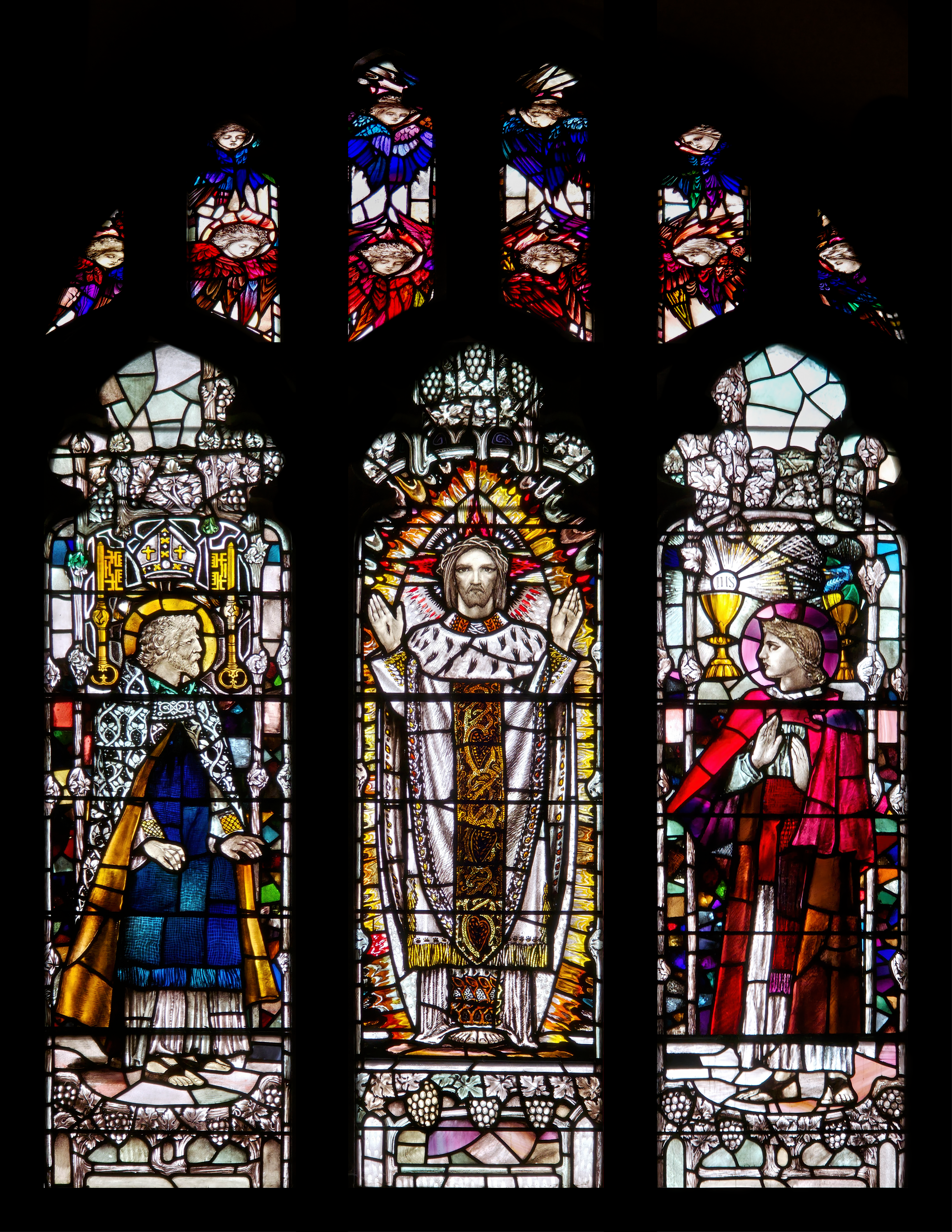
Stained-Glass Window by Christopher Whall

Douglass Shand Tucci said of the church: "Architect Ralph Adams Cram's first church, designed in partnership with Bertram Goodhue, was All Saints — Ashmont. A significant landmark in American architectural history, All Saints is, of its type, Cram and Goodhue's masterpiece, and a model for American parish church architecture for the first half of the 20th century."

== History ==
The parish began in 1867 as a mission of nearby St. Mary's Church. The cornerstone for current structure was laid in November 1892, and the congregation held its first services in the new edifice December 27, 1893. Construction was financed largely through the generosity of Colonel Oliver Peabody, one of the founders of Kidder, Peabody & Co., but was not substantially completed until 1929, when the side chapels were added.

== See also ==
- Grieg Taber
- National Register of Historic Places listings in southern Boston, Massachusetts
