= David Hurd =

American musician (born 1950)

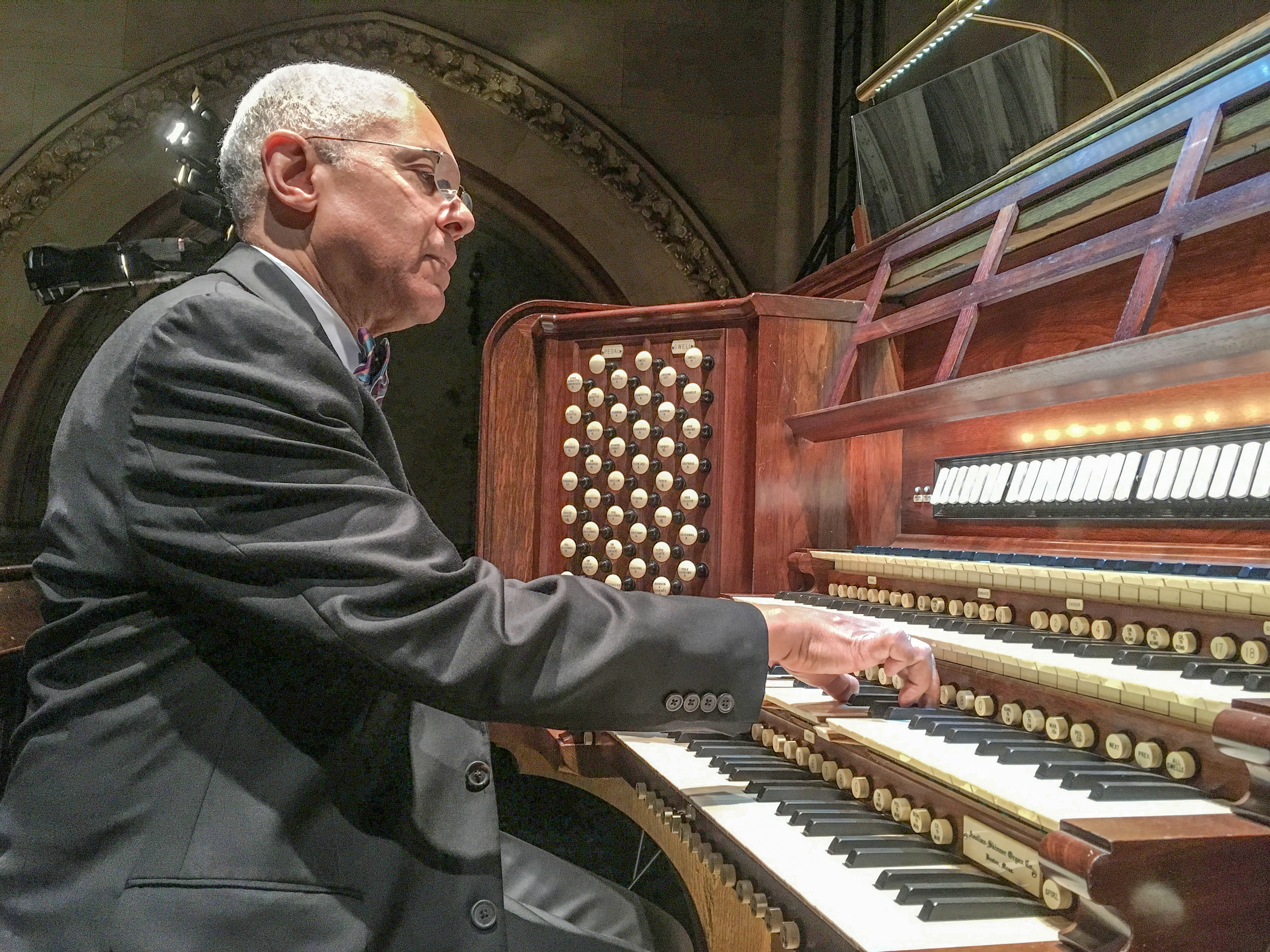
- David Hurd at the Church of Saint Mary the Virgin

Background information
- Born: 1950 (age 75–76)
- Occupations: Composer, Concert organist, Choral director and Educator

David Hurd (born 1950) is a composer, concert organist, choral director and educator.

== Education ==
Hurd attended the High School of Music & Art, the Juilliard School, both in New York City, and Oberlin College. He holds honorary doctorates from Berkeley Divinity School at Yale, Seabury-Western Theological Seminary, and Church Divinity School of the Pacific, given in recognition of his contributions to sacred music. In 1977 he received first prizes in both Organ Performance and in Organ Improvisation from the International Congress of Organists, being the only person to ever win both prizes in the same year.

== Career ==
Hurd was professor of sacred music and director of chapel music at the General Theological Seminary, Chelsea, New York City, for 39 years. He was also the music director at the Church of the Holy Apostles, also in Chelsea, until May 2013. He is presently the director of music at the Church of St. Mary the Virgin (Manhattan) in Times Square, New York City.

Hurd has held several church staff positions, including assistant organist, Trinity Church, and director of music at the Church of the Intercession and All Saints' Church, both in Manhattan.

== Works ==
His Intercession Mass setting is used by many congregations across the United States. With over 100 choral and organ works in print, his compositions have appeared in numerous recordings in both the United States and England. Hurd is regularly sought out by congregations and organizations seeking to commission new anthems and organ works. Significant premieres have included "Gloria, gloria", for four-part choir and instrumental accompaniment, commissioned by the Boys Choir of Harlem, and premiered at Avery Fisher Hall; "O the Depth of Love Divine," for four-part choir, brass and organ, commissioned by J. Neil Alexander, Bishop of Atlanta, and premiered at his consecration; and "Arioso & Final" for organ, commissioned by the queens Chapter of the American Guild of Organists. The most recent major work is "Sonata for Saxophone and Organ", commissioned by the Hall-Powers Duo, and premiered in Ljubljana, Slovenia, at the International Saxophone Congress in 2006. In 2014, Hurd completed a commissioned anthem for St. Dunstan's Episcopal Church, Atlanta, based on Psalm 100 in a modern, gender-neutral translation.

Hurd's sacred compositions can be found in many hymnals, including the Episcopal Hymnal, 1982. Hurd is one of the world's most visible and successful classical organists who is African-American.
