= Frank S. B. Gavin =

Frank Stanton Burns Gavin (October 13, 1890 - March 20, 1938) was an American Anglican priest, theologian, author, journalist and educator. He received his B.A. at the University of Cincinnati in 1912; B.H.L. at Hebrew Union College in 1923; a B.D. at the General Theological Seminary in 1915; and a Th.D. from Harvard University in 1916.

He served as literary editor of The Living Church beginning in 1924. He taught at Nashotah House Theological Seminaryin Wisconsin and the General Theological Seminary in New York.

The Frank Gavin Liturgical Foundation was established in his memory on May 26, 1944 in New York State. It published the Anglican Breviary in 1955 and the People's Anglican Missal in the American Edition in 1958.

== Select Bibliography ==
- Aphraates and the Jews: A Study of the Controversial Homilies of the Persian Sage in Their Relation to Jewish Thought (1923)
- Some Aspects of Contemporary Greek Orthodox Thought (1923)
- The Jewish Antecedents of the Christian Sacraments (1928)
- The Catholic Doctrine of Work and Play (1930)
- Selfhood and Sacrifice: The Seven Problems of the Atoning Life (1932)
- The Resources of the Church (1934)
- Seven Centuries of the Problem of Church and State (1938)
