= List of General Theological Seminary people =

This is a partial list of notable people associated with the General Theological Seminary, an Episcopal seminary in New York City.

== Faculty and Staff ==
- J. Neil Alexander (born 1954), professor of homiletics and liturgics; 9th Bishop of Atlanta
- Reginald R. Belknap (1871–1959), treasurer, bursar, and registrar
- Peter Carnley (born 1937), primate of Australia, visiting professor of systematic theology
- F. J. Foakes-Jackson (1855–1941), church historian
- Frank S. B. Gavin, ecumenist and historian
- Benjamin I. Haight, professor of pastoral theology
- Francis J. Hall (1857–1932), professor of dogmatic theology
- Francis L. Hawks (1798–1866), church historian
- John Henry Hobart (1775–1830), bishop of New York, founder, dean, pastoral theologian
- Eugene Augustus Hoffman (1829–1902), dean, benefactor
- Leonard Hodgson (1889–1969), theologian, church historian
- David Hurd (born 1950), organist, composer
- Alan Jones (born 1940), professor of ascetical theology
- Frederick Joseph Kinsman (1868–1944), church historian
- Lloyd A. Lewis (born 1947), adjunct professor of New Testament
- Clement Clarke Moore (1779–1863), biblical scholar, donor of land for the seminary, author of "A Visit from St. Nicholas"
- Benjamin T. Onderdonk (1791–1861), professor of nature, ministry and polity of the church, bishop of New York
- Pierson Parker (1905–1995), New Testament scholar
- W. Norman Pittenger (1905–1997), theologian
- Cornelius L. Reid (1911–2008), voice teacher
- Thomas Richey (1831-1905), alumnus and professor of church history
- Charles Roper (1858–1940), theologian, metropolitan of Ontario
- Alexander Schmemann (1921–1983), adjunct professor of liturgy
- Samuel Seabury (1801–1872), biblical scholar
- Niels Henry Sonne (1907–1944), rare books librarian and curator
- Eugene Sutton (born 1954), adjunct professor of homiletics
- Samuel H. Turner (1790–1861), Hebrew scholar
- Gulian C. Verplanck (1786–1870), professor of evidences of revealed religion and moral science, attorney, U.S. representative
- Julian Wachner (born 1969), professor of music
- Philip Waggett (1862–1939), British Anglo-Catholic priest
- Somerset Walpole (1854–1929), theologian, bishop of Edinburgh
- J. Robert Wright (1936-2022), church historian

== Alumni ==
- James M. Adams, Jr. (born 1948), bishop of Western Kansas
- J. Neil Alexander (born 1954), bishop of Atlanta
- Phil Ashey (born c. 1956), bishop of Western Anglicans
- Kevin Bond Allen (born 1954), bishop of Cascadia
- William Edmond Armitage (1830–1873), bishop of Wisconsin
- David Ball (born 1926), bishop of Albany
- Ellen Barrett (born 1946), Episcopal priest
- Frederick L. Barry (1897–1960), bishop of Albany
- Frederick H. Belden (1909-1979), Tenth bishop of the Episcopal Diocese of Rhode Island.
- Alan P. Bell (1932-2002), Kinsey Institute researcher
- Richard Nelson Bolles (born 1927), priest, self-help author
- Frederick Borsch (born 1935), bishop of Los Angeles
- William Hampton Brady (1912–1996), bishop of Fond du Lac
- Kenneth A. Bray (1895–1953), Episcopal priest, teacher, and coach
- James Lloyd Breck (1818–1876), founder of Nashotah House
- Benjamin Brewster (1860–1941), bishop of Western Colorado
- James Brown (born 1932), bishop of Louisiana
- John Henry Hobart Brown (1831–1888), first bishop of Fond du Lac
- Alexander Burgess (1819-1901), first Bishop of Quincy
- Spence Burton (1881–1966), bishop suffragan of Haiti, bishop of Nassau
- Clement Moore Butler (1810–1890), Episcopal priest and Chaplain of the Senate
- Arthur Carey (1822–1844), Episcopal priest
- Thomas Casady (1881–1958), bishop of Oklahoma
- Frank S. Cerveny (born 1933), bishop of Florida
- Albert Chambers (1906–1993), bishop of Springfield
- E. Otis Charles (born 1926), bishop of Utah
- Felix L. Cirlot (1901—1956), Episcopal priest and Anglo-Catholic writer
- Leighton Coleman (1837–1907), bishop of Delaware
- Arthur Cleveland Coxe (1818–1896), bishop of Western New York
- Roland de Corneille (born 1927), Canadian priest, member of Parliament
- Marvin Dana (1867–1926), author and magazine editor
- James DeKoven (1831–1879), Episcopal priest and educator
- Morgan Dix (1827–1908), Episcopal priest, theologian, author
- Shannon Rogers Duckworth, bishop of Louisiana
- Robert Duncan, (born 1948), bishop of Pittsburgh; archbishop and primate of the Anglican Church in North America
- Manton Eastburn (1801–1872), bishop of Massachusetts
- Christopher Epting (born 1946), bishop of Iowa
- John H. Esquirol (1900–1972), bishop of Connecticut
- William Leopold Essex (1886–1959), bishop of Quincy
- Sarah Fisher, Episcopal bishop
- Thomas F. Gailor (1856–1935), bishop of Tennessee
- Frederick R. Graves (1858–1940), missionary bishop of Shanghai
- Campbell Gray (1879–1944) bishop of Northern Indiana
- Frank T. Griswold (born 1937), bishop of Chicago, 25th presiding bishop of the Episcopal Church
- Francis Joseph Hall (1857–1933), theologian
- Alexander Hamilton (1847–1928), Episcopal priest
- Daniel W. Hardy (1930–2007), theologian
- Joseph M. Harte, (1914-1999) bishop of Arizona
- William Hatch (1875–1972), New Testament scholar
- Marion J. Hatchett (1927–2009), liturgical scholar
- Matthew Heyd, Episcopal priest
- Edward Young Higbee (1810–1871), Episcopal priest and Chaplain of the Senate
- Eugene Augustus Hoffman (1829–1902), Episcopal priest and benefactor
- John Henry Hopkins, Jr. (1820–1891), Episcopal priest, author of We Three Kings
- George Hendric Houghton (1820–1897), Episcopal priest
- Jack Iker (born 1949), bishop of Fort Worth
- Ignatius Zakka I Iwas (born 1933), patriarch of Antioch, Syriac Orthodox Church
- Stephen H. Jecko (1940–2007), bishop of Florida
- James L. Jelinek (born 1942), bishop of Minnesota
- Arthur Whipple Jenks (1863–1922), theologian
- Jim Kelsey (1952–2007), bishop of Northern Michigan
- William Ingraham Kip (1811–1893), first bishop of California
- David Buel Knickerbacker (1833–1894), bishop of Indiana
- Cyrus F. Knight (1831–1891), bishop of Milwaukee
- Alfred Lee (1807–1887), bishop of Delaware, 10th presiding bishop of the Episcopal Church
- Fritz Leiber (1910–1992), fantasy writer
- Abiel Leonard (1848-1903), bishop of the Episcopal Diocese of Utah with Nevada Territory
- Arthur C. Lichtenberger (1900–1968), bishop of Missouri, 21st presiding bishop
- Harry S. Longley (1868–1944), bishop of Iowa
- Theodore B. Lyman (1815–1893), bishop of North Carolina
- Reginald Mallett (1893–1965), bishop of Northern Indiana
- C. Shannon Mallory (born 1936), bishop of Botswana, bishop of El Camino Real
- Santosh Marray (born 1957), bishop of Seychelles
- Baselios Mar Thoma Mathews II (1915–2006), 89th Catholicos of the East
- Jim McGreevey (born 1957), governor of New Jersey
- James McMaster (1820–1886), Roman Catholic newspaper editor
- Eric Menees, bishop of San Joaquin
- Steven Andrew Miller (born 1957), bishop of Milwaukee
- William Millsaps (born 1939), presiding bishop, Episcopal Missionary Church
- Leonel Mitchell (1930–2012), liturgical scholar
- Paul Moore, Jr. (1919–2003), bishop of New York
- Frank Morales (born 1949), Episcopal priest and activist
- Benjamin Wistar Morris (1819–1906), bishop of Oregon
- Theodore N. Morrison (1850–1929), bishop of Iowa
- Arthur Moulton (1873–1962), bishop of Utah
- Marc Nikkel (1950–2000), priest, missionary to the Dinka
- William Odenheimer (1817–1879) bishop of New Jersey
- G. Ashton Oldham (1877–1963), bishop of Albany
- Hugh R. Page (b. 1956), Episcopal priest and scholar at Notre Dame University
- Austin Pardue (1899–1981), bishop of Pittsburgh
- Leighton Parks (1852–1938), Episcopal priest
- Henry N. Parsley, Jr. (born 1948), bishop of Alabama
- Samuel Penny (1808–1853), Episcopal priest
- ZeBarney Thorne Phillips (1875–1942), Episcopal priest and Chaplain of the Senate
- Norman Pittenger (1905–1997), theologian
- Jeannette Piccard (1895–1981), high altitude balloonist, priest (one of the Philadelphia Eleven)
- Alberto Ramento (1936–2006), ninth supreme bishop of the Philippine Independent Church
- George Maxwell Randall (1810–1873), missionary bishop of Colorado
- Ann Holmes Redding (born 1951), priest, convert to Islam
- Francisco Reus-Froylan (1919–2008), bishop of Puerto Rico
- Gene Robinson (born 1947), bishop of New Hampshire
- Nelson Somerville Rulison (1842–1897), bishop of Central Pennsylvania
- Frank Runyeon (born 1953), stage and screen actor
- Robert C. Rusack (1926–1986), bishop of Los Angeles
- Francis Huger Rutledge (1799–1866), bishop of Florida
- Henry Y. Satterlee (1843–1908), bishop of Washington
- John Scarborough (1831–1913), bishop of New Jersey
- Alan Scarfe (born 1950), bishop of Iowa
- Joseph Schereschewsky (1831–1906), missionary bishop of Shanghai
- John-David Schofield (1938–2013), bishop of San Joaquin
- Livingston Rowe Schuyler (1868–1931), historian and Episcopal priest
- Lorenzo Sears (1838–1916), historian and biographer
- M. Thomas Shaw, SSJE (born 1945), bishop of Massachusetts
- Herbert Shipman (1869–1930), bishop suffragan of New York
- Adam Shoemaker, Episcopal clergyman
- Sam Shoemaker (1893–1963), founder, Faith at Work
- Frederick Herbert Sill (1874–1952), founder, headmaster of Kent School
- Mark Sisk (born 1942), bishop of New York
- Richard P. Smiraglia (born 1952), librarian and information scientist
- Gordon V. Smith (1906–1997), bishop of Iowa
- Franklin Spencer Spalding (1865–1914), missionary bishop of Utah
- John Franklin Spalding (1828–1902), bishop of Colorado
- Robert R. Spears, Jr. (1918–2008), bishop of Rochester
- William L. Stevens (1932–1997), bishop of Fond du Lac
- Andrew St. John, Assistant Bishop of Melbourne
- Joseph Wilson Sutton, Episcopal priest
- Ethelbert Talbot (1848–1928), bishop of Bethlehem, 15th presiding bishop of the Episcopal Church
- Frederick W. Taylor (1853–1903), bishop of Quincy
- Robert Terwilliger (1917–1991), bishop suffragan of Dallas
- Andrew Yu-Yue Tsu (朱友渔, 1885–1986) assistant bishop of Hong Kong, general secretary of the Chung Hua Sheng Kung Hui, "Bishop of the Burma Road"
- Daniel S. Tuttle (1837–1923), bishop of Missouri, 13th presiding bishop of the Episcopal Church
- Ralph Ernest Urban, (1875–1935) suffragan bishop of New Jersey
- Thomas Hubbard Vail (1821–1889), bishop of Kansas
- George Roe Van De Water, major proponent of the compatibility of Freemasonry with Christianity
- Vedder Van Dyck (1889–1960), bishop of Vermont
- Kenneth Abbott Viall (1893–1974), provincial superior, SSJE, assistant bishop of Tokyo
- Orris George Walker, (1942-2015), seventh bishop of the Episcopal Diocese of Long Island
- Clarence A. Walworth (1820–1900), Roman Catholic priest and writer
- Edward Nason West (1909–1990), sub-dean, Cathedral of St. John the Divine
- Ozi William Whitaker (1830–1911), bishop of Pennsylvania
- Henry John Whitehouse (1803–1874), bishop of Illinois
- William Rollinson Whittingham (1805–1879), bishop of Maryland
- Frederick B. Williams (1939–2008), priest, social activist
- John Williams (1817–1899), bishop of Connecticut, 11th presiding bishop of the Episcopal Church
- Frank E. Wilson (1885–1944), bishop of Eau Claire
- Ferguson Glen, a fictitious priest and main character in the novel Thin Blue Smoke, by Doug Worgul.
