= Sheila Nickerson =

American poet and writer (born 1942)

Sheila Bunker Nickerson (April 14, 1942 – September 27, 2026) was an American poet and writer. She served as poet laureate of Alaska and was twice awarded the Pushcart Prize. Much of her writing focuses on Alaska, nature, and arctic exploration.

== Life and education ==
Nickerson was born on April 14, 1942 in New York City. She was the eldest of three children of Charles Cantine Bunker and Mavis Bunker (née McGuire), and the great niece of diplomat Ellsworth Bunker.

After attending the Chapin School, Nickerson went on to Bryn Mawr College, where she majored in English. She also received a Ph.D. in creative writing from the Union Institute and University.

Nickerson was married to Martinus Hoffman Nickerson, the son of Jane Soames Nickerson, who produced the first authorized English translation of Benito Mussolini's "The Doctrine of Fascism.” Her father-in-law was Hoffman Nickerson, a historian and grandson of noted clergyman Eugene Augustus Hoffman, and her brother-in-law Eugene Nickerson presided over prominent cases including the challenge to the Pentagon's "Don't ask, don't tell" policy on homosexuality, the racketeering trial of John Gotti, and the notorious Abner Louima police brutality case in New York.

Nickerson previously lived in Juneau, Alaska. She died on September 27, 2026, and lived in Bellingham, Washington at the time of her death.

== Career and work ==
Nickerson was named poet laureate of Alaska in 1977. She served as writer-in-residence for the State of Alaska Artists-in-the-Schools program, was writer-in-residence at the Alaska State Library, and was co-founder of University Within Walls, a statewide prison education program. She was also editor of Alaska's Wildlife, a magazine published by the State of Alaska Department of Fish & Game.

Nickerson's poems and essays have been published in a number of literary magazines and anthologies. In 1976, she was awarded the Pushcart Prize for the poem "The Song of the Soapstone Carver". In 1986, she was again awarded the Pushcart Prize for the poem "Kodiak Widow".

Her 1996 nonfiction work Disappearance: A Map, is part personal memoir about the loss of a colleague and part nonfiction account of disappearances in Alaska, including Franklin's lost expedition in 1845, polar expeditions of Captain Bob Bartlett and Vilhjalmur Stefansson and more recent vanishings such as those of U.S. Congressmen Nick Begich and Hale Boggs. Nickerson discussed disappearances in Alaska in the "Alaska's Bermuda Triangle" episode of The History Channel's History's Mysteries series.

In 2001 Nickerson was a Harriman scholar participating in The Harriman Expedition Retraced, a voyage sponsored by Smith College and the Public Broadcasting Service following the itinerary of the Harriman Alaska Expedition of 1899. She was interviewed in a 2-hour PBS documentary film about the 2001 expedition.

== Published works ==
=== Poetry ===
- Hitchhiking the Highway of Tears (Moonpath Press, 2017) ISBN 978-1-936657-31-5
- Along the Alaska Highway (Sheltering Pines Press, 2009)
- In an August Garden (Black Spruce Press, 1997) ISBN 978-1884236037
- Feast of the Animals: An Alaska Bestiary, Vol. II (with engravings by Dale DeArmond, Old Harbor Press, 1991) ISBN 978-0961552985
- In the Compass of Unrest (Trout Creek Press, 1988) ISBN 978-0916155049
- Feast of the Animals: An Alaska Bestiary, Vol. I (with engravings by Dale DeArmond, Old Harbor Press, 1987) ISBN 978-0961552947
- On Why the Quilt-Maker Became a Dragon (Vanessapress, 1985) ISBN 978-0914221043
- Waiting for the News of Death (Bits Press, 1982)
- Songs of the Pine Wife (Copper Canyon Press, 1980) ISBN 978-0914742418
- To the Waters and the Wild: Poems of Alaska (Thorp Springs Press, 1975) ISBN 978-0914476429
- Letter from Alaska and Other Poems (Thorp Springs Press, 1972)

=== Fiction ===
- In Rooms of Falling Rain (Thorp Springs Press, 1976) ISBN 978-0914476566

=== Nonfiction ===
- Blackbird Flying, a memoir (Fuze Publishing, 2019) ISBN 978-0-9998089-6-2
- Harnessed to the Pole: Sledge Dogs in Service to American Explorers of the Arctic 1853-1909 (University of Alaska Press, 2014) ISBN 978-1602232235
- Midnight to the North: The Untold Story of the Inuit Woman Who Saved the Polaris Expedition (Tarcher/Penguin Putnam, 2002) ISBN 978-1585421336
- Disappearance: A Map (Doubleday, 1996) ISBN 978-0385481700
- Writers in the Public Library (The Shoe String Press, 1984) ISBN 978-0208018724
