= Joseph Sutton =

Joseph or Joe Sutton may refer to:

- Joseph Sutton (college president), American academic and president of Indiana University
- Joseph William Sutton, Australian engineer, shipbuilder and inventor
- Joseph Wilson Sutton, American minister of the Episcopal Church
- Joe Sutton, American playwright
- Joe Sutton (journalist), American journalist and designer
- Joe Sutton (American football), American football player
