= Nikkel =

Nikkel is a surname. Notable people with the surname include:

- Ben Nikkel, American footballer
- B.J. Nikkel, American politician
- Marc Nikkel (1950–2000), American priest
- Princess Chelsea (born 1985), a.k.a. Chelsea Lee Nikkel, New Zealand singer, producer and visual artist
