= Kenneth Viall =

Kenneth Abbott Viall SSJE (December 19, 1893 – January 3, 1974) was born in Lynn, Massachusetts as the only son of Frederick Clarence Viall and Edith Laura (Robbins) Viall. He received his A.B. from Harvard College in 1915, and B.D. from the General Theological Seminary, New York, in 1919. He received an M.A. from the Harvard Graduate School of Education in 1920, and an Ed.M. in 1921. He received an honorary S.T.D. from the General Seminary in 1949.

Viall was ordained to the diaconate on April 21, 1918, and to the priesthood on January 7, 1919. He was professed in the Society of St. John the Evangelist on December 19, 1923, and assigned to the SSJE's house in Korea. He returned to California and served at the Church of the Advent, San Francisco from 1924 to 1935.

He was assigned to the SSJE house in Japan in 1934, and served as Provincial Superior of the SSJE in Japan from 1938 until his death. He was on furlough from 1940–1947 at the society's house in Cambridge during World War II. He was consecrated suffragan Bishop of Tokyo on April 25, 1949, and retired on the consecration of Bishop Goto on November 6, 1959.

Viall is buried at St. Michael's Monastery, Oyama, Tochigi Prefecture.
