= Felix L. Cirlot =

Felix Lossing Cirlot (August 3, 1901 — March 30, 1956) was a notable American Anglo-Catholic writer in the Episcopal Church during the twentieth century. Cirlot published a wide variety of publications on controversial topics, including Episcopal-Presbyterian ecumenical proposals and the apostolic succession. He was born in Mobile, Alabama and graduated from Spring Hill College and the General Theological Seminary before ordination to the priesthood in 1928.

Cirlot was chaplain to the Community of St. John Baptist in Mendham, New Jersey, and chaplain to the Order of St. Helena in Versailles, Kentucky. He was also professor of New Testament and Apologetics at Nashotah House Theological Seminary from 1930 to 1933. He served as an assisting priest at Church of St. Mary the Virgin (Manhattan) and St. Paul's Church, Brooklyn, and as rector of St. Andrew's Church, Buffalo from 1936 to 1941. He was also curate at St. Clement's, New York from 1941 to 1944 and from 1946 to 1953.

Cirlot died of a heart attack in El Paso, Texas.

== Bibliography ==
- Eucharistic Origins (1935)
- The Church's Marriage Laws (1937)
- The Early Eucharist (London: SPCK, 1939)
- Against the Proposed Concordat with the Presbyterians (1940)
- The Divorce Question Again (1940)
- The Anglican Position on the Number of Sacraments (1941)
- Is the Catholic Church and Her Apostolic Ministry from Jesus Christ Our Lord? A Detailed Cross-Examination of the so-called Critical Attack on This Important Truth, as Presented by Dr. B.S. Easton and Other Outstanding Critical Scholars of the "Advanced" School of Critics for Over a Generation (1941)
- Christ and Divorce (1945)
- Apostolic Succession at the Bar of Modern Scholarship (1946)
- Apostolic Succession and Anglicanism: A Defense of Anglican Orders and Catholicity (1946)
- Apostolic Succession: Is It True? (1949)
- The Anglican View of Catholic Teaching Authority
- The Official Anglican Position on the Church and the Ministry
- The Prayer Book and the Eucharist
