= Norman Pittenger =

William Norman Pittenger (July 23, 1905 – June 19, 1997) was an Anglican minister, teacher, and theologian. He wrote about and promoted process theology, and became one of the first acknowledged Christian defenders for the open acceptance of homosexual relations among Christians. He served as Vice-Chairman and the Chairman of the Theological Commission of the World Council of Churches from the mid-1950s through the early 1960s. He lived most of his life in the United States, though from 1966 until his death he lived at King's College at Cambridge University as an honorary member of the university.

== Biography ==
=== Early life, training, and academic positions ===
William Norman Pittenger was born in Bogota, New Jersey on July 23, 1905, and was raised in Princeton, New Jersey. He attended Princeton University for a short time, but left without graduating because he wanted to try a career as a newspaper reporter in New York City. Not able to find satisfaction, he went to The General Theological Seminary of the Episcopal Church of the USA, on Manhattan Island in New York. He started as a student and soon he became tutor. He was named an Instructor in Christian Apologetics in 1935 at the same Seminary, and was ordained a deacon in the Church in 1936, and a priest in 1937; he served as Instructor at the seminary until 1951, when he was elevated to the rank of Professor in the same department there, a position that he held until 1966.

=== Career, corpus, and retirement ===
Norman Pittenger was one of the first process theologians without connections with the University of Chicago Divinity School, and produced the first genuine works on process theological christology (see The Word Incarnate. 1959). Pittenger wrote ninety books and many articles throughout his life (see below). In addition to his writing on explicitly Christian themes, he wrote on sexuality in general (e.g., Making Sexuality Human, 1970) and penned a Christian defense of homosexuality in particular (Time for Consent, 1970), a book that was so controversial when published that the Church Times refused to review it. He also became "discreetly open about his own homosexual orientation" in this era of his life. After his retirement in 1966 he established himself at King's College, Cambridge University, where, though not a Fellow, he participated in activities and meals as an Honorary Senior Member until the end of his life; he died at King's Lynn, Norfolk on 19 June 1997.

== Positions and honors ==
The following are some of the positions and honors that Pittenger held or received during his lifetime:

- Paddock Lecturer, General Theological Seminary, 1966.
- President, American Theology Society, 1948–1949.
- Vice-Chairman, Theological Commission, World Council of Churches, 1954–1962.
- Chairman 1962-64, Theological Commission, World Council of Churches, 1954–62.
- Honorary Senior Member (non-fellow), King's College, Cambridge, 1964–1997

== Selected works ==
Norman Pittenger authored ninety books and many articles. The following is a partial list:

- 1959 The Word Incarnate: A Study of the Doctrine of the Person of Christ, Harper & Brothers.
- 1967 God in Process, London:SCM Press Ltd. (Call No. BT83.6 P5)
- 1968 Process-Thought and Christian Faith, New York: Macmillan Company. (Call No. BR100 P615 1968)
- 1969 Alfred North Whitehead, John Knox Press.
- 1969 God's Way with Men: A Study of the Relationship Between God and Man in Providence, "Miracle," and Prayer, London: Hodder & Stoughton, Valley Forge, Pa:Judson Press.
- 1970 "The Last Things" in a Process Perspective, London: Epworth Press.
- 1970 Making Sexuality Human, United Church Press.
- 1970 Time for Consent: A Christian's Approach to Homosexuality, London: SCM Press.
- 1970 Christology Reconsidered, London: SCM Press.
- 1974 The Holy Spirit, United Church Press.
- 1974 Love and Control in Sexuality, United Church Press.
- 1980 After death/Life in God, London:SCM Press Ltd.
- 1989 Becoming and Belonging, Wilton, CT:Morehouse Publications. (Call No. BT77 .P49 1989)
