= Tom Shaw (bishop) =

20th and 21st-century American Episcopal bishop

The Right Reverend Tom Shaw SSJE
- Bishop of Massachusetts
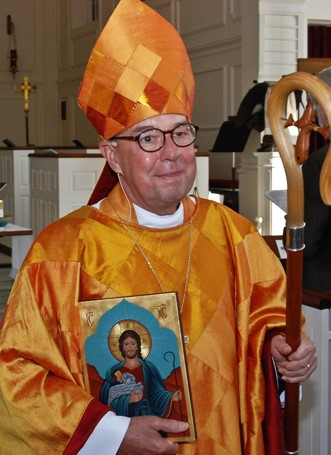
- Church: Episcopal Church
- Diocese: Massachusetts
- In office: 1995–2014
- Predecessor: David Elliot Johnson
- Successor: Alan McIntosh Gates
- Previous post: Coadjutor Bishop of Massachusetts (1994–1995)

Orders
- Ordination: 1971
- Consecration: September 24, 1994 by Edmond L. Browning

Personal details
- Born: Marvil Thomas Shaw; August 28, 1945 Battle Creek, Michigan, United States
- Died: October 17, 2014 (aged 69) West Newbury, Massachusetts, United States
- Denomination: Anglican

Marvil Thomas Shaw III SSJE (August 28, 1945 – October 17, 2014) was an American Episcopal bishop based in New England and a member of the Society of St. John the Evangelist religious order. In 1995, he was called as the fifteenth Bishop of Massachusetts.

== Early life ==
Marvil Thomas Shaw was born in Battle Creek, Michigan, to Marvil Thomas II and Wilma Sylvia (née Janes) Shaw. He was a graduate of Alma College and held a Master of Divinity degree from General Theological Seminary in New York and a Master of Arts degree in theology from the Catholic University of America in Washington, D.C.

== Ordained ministry ==
Shaw was ordained deacon on July 2, 1970, and to the priesthood in 1971. He served as curate at the Church of St. Mary the Virgin in Higham Ferrers, Northamptonshire, England, from 1970 to 1972 and as assistant rector of St. James' Church in Milwaukee from 1972 to 1974.

In 1975, Shaw entered the Society of St. John the Evangelist, a religious order of priests and lay brothers in the Anglican Communion. Life professed in the society in 1981, he served a term as its superior, beginning in 1983, during which he established the retreat center at Emery House in West Newbury, Massachusetts; began Cowley Publications, an Episcopal publishing house; and developed a Boston-area program for inner-city boys and their families. In demand nationwide as a preacher, retreat leader and spiritual director, he served in 1993 as chaplain to the House of Bishops of the Episcopal Church. He wrote extensively, including his 2007 book Conversations with Scripture and Each Other (Rowman & Littlefield).

Shaw was elected bishop coadjutor of the Diocese of Massachusetts on the first ballot at a special diocesan convention held on March 12, 1994, at the Cathedral Church of St. Paul in Boston. He was consecrated a bishop on September 24, 1994, becoming the 898th bishop of the Episcopal Church. He succeeded the late Bishop David E. Johnson in January 1995 to become the fifteenth Bishop of Massachusetts.

Shaw was an active witness and voice for peace with justice in Palestine and Israel. He traveled frequently and led groups to the Holy Land, Africa and Central America, developing and strengthening mission relationships within the Anglican Communion and partnerships to further the church's work of reconciliation and service in the world, with a particular focus on eradication of poverty and disease. Shaw contributed to the work of the 1998 Lambeth Conference on international debt and economic justice issues. In 2000, he spent a month in Washington, D.C. as a congressional intern, exploring the church's role in public life. He was a past chairman of the Episcopal Church's Standing Commission on National and International Concerns and the advisory council for the Anglican Observer to the United Nations. He served on the program planning committee for the Episcopal Church's House of Bishops and its program for formation of new bishops.

Shaw was a founding member and the chair of the board of the Epiphany Middle School, a tuition-free inner-city Boston school, and initiated the Youth Leadership Academy in the Diocese of Massachusetts, a Christian leadership training program for high school-aged Episcopalians. The completion in 2003 of the Barbara C. Harris Camp and Conference Center in Greenfield, New Hampshire, was the result of his vision and leadership toward building strong lay and ordained leadership and ministering to children and young people to bring about their full inclusion in the life of the church, as was his 2008 initiation of a young adult relational evangelism ministry in the Diocese of Massachusetts.

On January 15, 2013, Shaw announced his intention to retire at a time to be determined following the consecration of his successor. On April 15, 2014, the convention of the diocese elected the Rev. Alan McIntosh Gates as Shaw's successor. Gates was consecrated on September 13, 2014, at Boston University's Agganis Arena.

In August 2014, Shaw informed the people of his diocese that the brain cancer he had been diagnosed with in May 2013 was terminal. He had decided to focus medical care on palliative care, maintaining his quality of life for the remainder of his time. Shaw died of brain cancer on October 17, 2014.

Episcopal Church (USA) titles
Preceded by David Elliot Johnson	Bishop of Massachusetts; 1995–2014	Succeeded by Alan M. Gates
