= Alan M. Gates =

American bishop

The Right Reverend Alan M. Gates
- Bishop of Massachusetts
- Church: Episcopal Church
- Diocese: Massachusetts
- Elected: April 5, 2014
- In office: 2014–2024
- Predecessor: Tom Shaw
- Successor: Julia Whitworth

Orders
- Ordination: June 13, 1987 (deacon); March 26, 1988 (priest)
- Consecration: September 13, 2014 by Stephen T. Lane

Personal details
- Born: March 25, 1958 (age 68) Massachusetts, United States
- Denomination: Anglican
- Spouse: Patricia J. Harvey
- Children: 2

Alan McIntosh Gates (born March 25, 1958) served as the sixteenth bishop of the Episcopal Diocese of Massachusetts.

== Life and career ==
He is a Massachusetts native and graduate of Middlebury College. Prior to seminary he was a Russian language translator, researcher and intelligence analyst for the U.S. Department of Defense, including a tour of duty at the State Department. After studies at Episcopal Divinity School he was ordained to the diaconate on June 13, 1987, and to the priesthood on March 26, 1988. He served congregations in the Episcopal dioceses of Massachusetts, Western Massachusetts and Chicago prior to his call to Ohio in 2004. He served as the rector of St. Paul's Church in Cleveland Heights until his election as bishop in 2014. He was consecrated as a bishop on September 13, 2014.

Bishop Gates is currently on the board of the Anglican Theological Review. He serves on the Episcopal Church's Standing Commission on World Mission, and is a member of Bishops United Against Gun Violence. He and his spouse, Patricia J. Harvey, have two adult children.

== See also ==
- List of Episcopal bishops of the United States
- Historical list of the Episcopal bishops of the United States

Episcopal Church (USA) titles
Preceded by M. Thomas Shaw	16th Bishop of Massachusetts; 2014-2024	Succeeded by Julia Whitworth
