= Philip Waggett =

The Reverend P. N. Waggett SSJE
- Born: 27 February 1862; Kensington, London, England
- Died: 4 July 1939 (aged 77); Oxford, England

Ecclesiastical career
- Church: Church of England
- Ordained: 1885
- Congregations: Society of St John the Evangelist (1892–1939); St Mary the Great, Cambridge (1927–1930)
- Military career
- Allegiance: United Kingdom
- Branch: British Army
- Service years: 1914–1920
- Rank: Chaplain to the Forces 3rd Class/Major
- Unit: Royal Army Chaplains' Department
- Conflicts: First World War
- Awards: Mentioned in despatches (2)

Philip Napier Waggett SSJE (27 February 1862 – 4 July 1939) was a British Anglican priest, scholar, and military chaplain.

== Early life and education ==
Waggett was born on 27 February 1862 in Kensington, London, England. He was one of four sons of John Waggett, a "distinguished London physician": his younger brother, Ernest, became a distinguished surgeon. He was educated at Charterhouse School, an all-boys public school in Surrey. He studied natural sciences at Christ Church, Oxford, where he had been awarded an exhibition, and he graduated with a first class Bachelor of Arts (BA) degree in 1884. He was drawn to Anglo-Catholicism while studying for his first degree at Oxford University, coming under the influence of Charles Gore, E. S. Talbot, Francis Paget, and H. S. Holland. He then took a second degree in theology, and graduated with a second class BA in 1985, after only one year of study.

== Ordained ministry ==
Waggett was ordained in the Church of England as a deacon in 1885 and a priest in 1886. After parish ministry, he joined the Society of St John the Evangelist in 1892. He served with the religious order in Oxford, Cape Town, London and Cambridge. He served in the British Army as a chaplain throughout the First World War, and was tasked as a political officer with the Egyptian Expeditionary Force in Palestine from 1918 to 1920. Returning to civilian life, he was a missionary in India and a lecturer at the General Theological Seminary in New York, before serving as Vicar of St Mary the Great, Cambridge from 1927 to 1930. He lived out his retirement with the Cowley Fathers and is buried in the churchyard of Cowley St John, Oxford.

=== Military service ===
Waggett volunteered as a chaplain with the British Army on the outbreak of the First World War. After training, he was commissioned as a temporary chaplain to the forces 4th class (equivalent in rank to captain) on 17 December 1914. He served with the British Expeditionary Force in France from September 1914. He was senior chaplain of the 7th Division in 1916 and senior chaplain Tidworth area from 1917 to 1918. He was promoted to temporary chaplain to the forces 3rd class (equivalent to major) on 18 April 1916. He was twice mentioned in despatches for service in France.

In May 1918, Waggett was posted to Palestine on a "special mission". On 16 January 1919, he was appointed a temporary major "whilst so employed". From February 1919 to August 2020, he served on the general staff of the Egyptian Expeditionary Force in Jerusalem. He relinquished the rank of major on 16 July 1920, and his commission and rank of chaplain to the forces 3rd class on 18 July 1920. Upon retiring from the Army in August 1920, he was appointed an honorary chaplain to the forces 3rd class.

== Selected works ==
- Waggett, P.N. (1901). "Science and Faith: An address given at the Pusey House, Oxford". Pusey House Occasional Papers (3).
- Waggett, P.N. (1905). "Science and Conduct: An address given at the Pusey House, Oxford". Pusey House Occasional Papers (4).
- Waggett, P. N. (1905). The scientific temper in religion, and other addresses. London: Longmans, Green and co.
