= Earle H. Maddux =

American liturgist (1906–1974)

Earle Hewitt Maddux SSJE (June 18, 1906 – December 1974) was a notable American Anglo-Catholic liturgist in the Episcopal Church during the twentieth century. He was professed in the Society of St. John the Evangelist in 1936. He is known best for his edition of The American Missal, first published in 1951. (This is not to be confused with the Anglican Missal or the English Missal.) Maddux was born in Fairfield, Iowa and ordained to the priesthood on June 15, 1930 in Denver, Colorado.

Maddux was chaplain to the Order of St. Anne in Arlington, Massachusetts from 1941 to 1948, and chaplain to the All Saints Sisters of the Poor in Catonsville, Maryland from 1951 to until his retirement from active ministry in 1972.

== Works ==
- A Manual for Priests of the American Church Complementary to the Occasional Offices of the Book of Common Prayer (1944)
- Tenebrae Offices: The Evening Services of Wednesday, Thursday and Friday in Holy Week (1946)
- The American Missal: The Complete Liturgy of the American Book of Common Prayer with Additional Devotional Material Appropriate to the Same (1951)
- An American Holy Week Manual: The Liturgy from Palm Sunday through Easter Day (1958)
