= Society of St John the Evangelist =

Anglican religious order

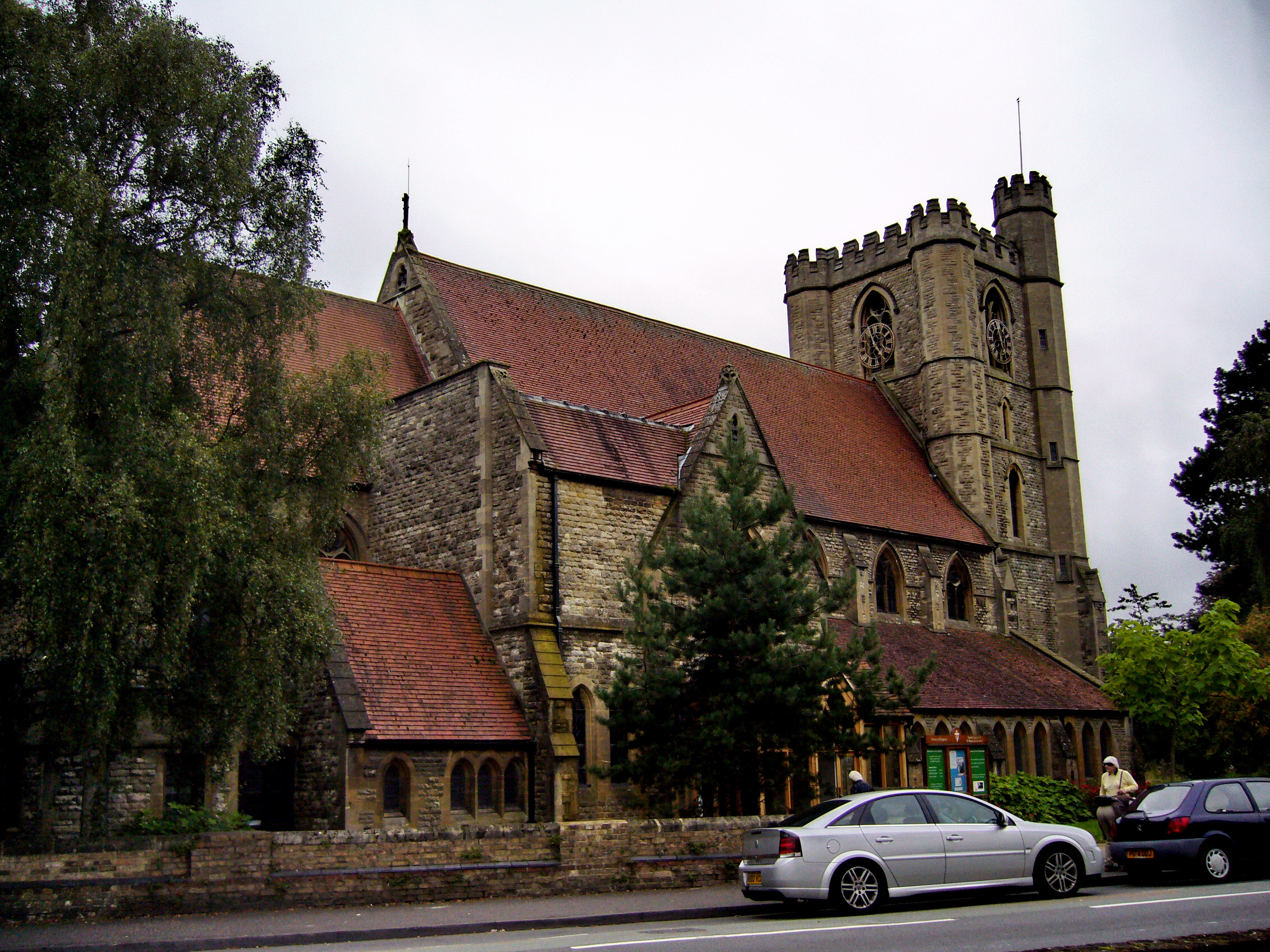
- Church of SS. Mary and John, Cowley Road
- Abbreviation: SSJE
- Formation: 1866; 160 years ago
- Founder: Richard Meux Benson; Charles Chapman Grafton
- Type: Anglican religious order
- Headquarters: Cambridge, Massachusetts, US
- Superior: Br. Keith Nelson
- Website: ssje.org

The Society of St John the Evangelist (SSJE) is an Anglican religious order for men. The members live under a rule of life and, at profession, make monastic vows of poverty, celibacy and obedience.

SSJE was founded in 1866 at Cowley, Oxford, England, by Richard Meux Benson, Charles Chapman Grafton, and Simeon Wilberforce O'Neill. Known colloquially as the Cowley Fathers, the society was the first stable religious community of men to be established in the Anglican Communion since the English Reformation. For many years the society had houses in England, Scotland, India, South Africa, Japan, and Canada.

== British congregation ==
The society in England operated from Marston Street, Oxford from 1868 to 1980. The mother house of the Society occupied a large area of land bordered by Cowley Road on one side, and Iffley Road on the other. The site incorporated three chapels, a mission church, a song school, a community school, accommodation for the Brothers, and guest quarters. When the Society withdrew from Marston Street in 1980, the buildings were transferred to St Stephen's House theological college. A small SSJE monastery was opened further along the Iffley Road, where it operated for several years.

In 1905 the Society opened St Edward's House on Great College Street in Westminster, London, where it provided retreats and other ministries until 2012. Oxford University professor C. S. Lewis visited Father Walter Adams, making confession to Father Adams as a spiritual discipline from 1940 until Father Adams died on March 3, 1952. Lewis gave much credit to Father Adams for his ministry. St. Edward's House closed in 2012 and the property was sold.

Following the closure of St Edward's House, the Society no longer maintains a monastery in the British Isles. The British congregation had three professed Brothers in 2012, all of whom continued to live as solitaries. The British Congregation ended in December 2025 following the death of its last member James Simon

=== Fellowship of St John Trust ===
The society administers The Fellowship of St John (UK) Trust Association, a registered charity, which gives grants to UK and foreign agencies for education and missionary work.

== North American congregation ==
In 1870 the society came to Boston, Massachusetts, where it became part of the Protestant Episcopal Church in the United States of America. The members of the North American congregation live in a monastery designed by Ralph Adams Cram in Cambridge, near Harvard Square. The guest house was built in memory of Isabella Stewart Gardner. The society has a rural retreat centre, Emery House, in West Newbury, where guests can stay in small hermitages in the meadow.

The community's chief ministries are preaching, spiritual direction, and hospitality. For some years they have been affiliated with St. George's College, Jerusalem, serving as chaplains on a number of pilgrimages to the Holy Land each year. They have also conducted mission trips to Africa. Individual brothers work in various local and regional ministries with students, prisoners, soldiers, the homeless, and persons affected by HIV and AIDS. One of the brothers, M. Thomas Shaw, SSJE, served as the 15th Bishop of the Episcopal Diocese of Massachusetts.

Br. James Koester SSJE, a former superior, was born in Regina, Saskatchewan, Canada. He received his M.Div. from Trinity College, Toronto. He was ordained in Anglican Church of Canada in Diocese of British Columbia in 1985. He served in parish ministry for five years before coming to SSJE and was professed as a Brother in 1992. Br. James served in a variety of roles including Deputy Superior and Brother in Charge of Emery House. During his time there Grafton House was opened for monastic interns, men and women.

Cowley Publications was run by the society until 2007, when it was sold to Rowman & Littlefield.

=== Fellowship of Saint John (USA) ===
The Fellowship of Saint John in the United States is a group of individuals (including men and women as well as both lay and ordained members) who wish to live in a closer relation with the brothers of the Society of St John the Evangelist. They write and follow a rule of life similar to The Rule under which the brothers live. Members of the fellowship support the society through their friendship and prayers, and look to SSJE for support and inspiration. They commit to reading and learning from the SSJE Rule of Life regularly and visiting on retreat when possible. There are about 1,000 men and women in the fellowship.

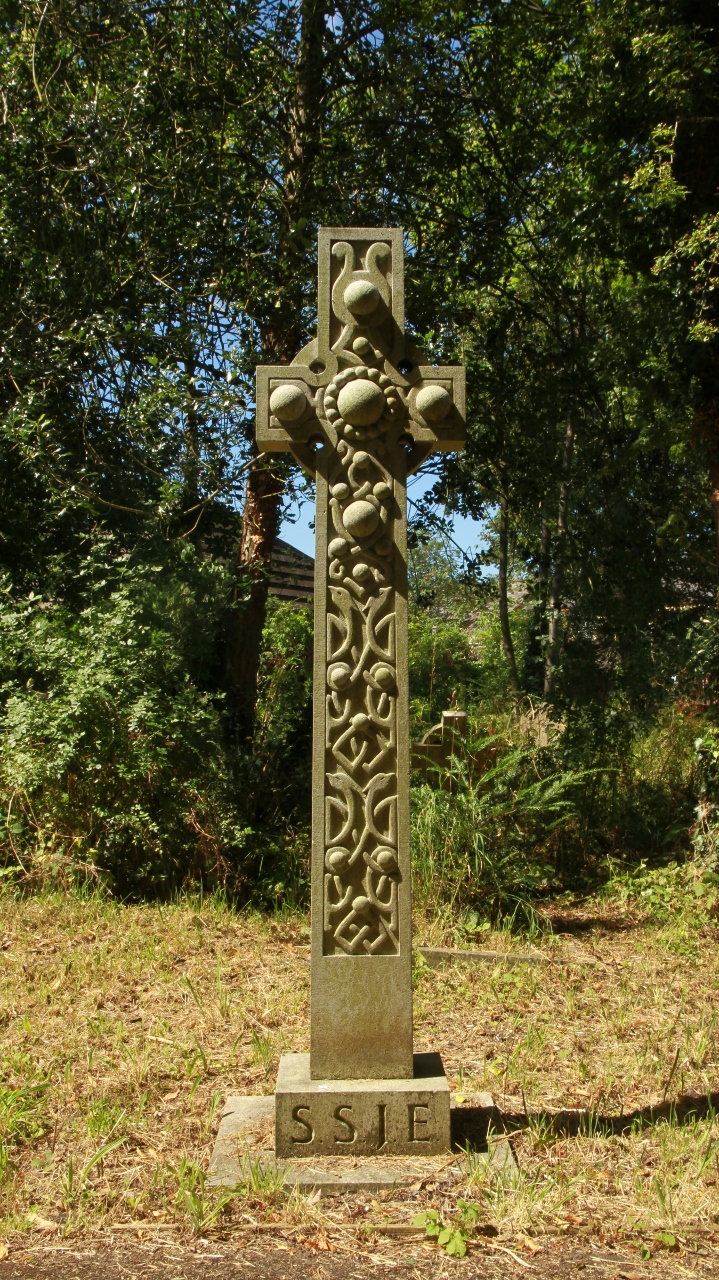
Memorial cross to members of the Society in SS Mary and John parish churchyard, Cowley Road, Oxford

== People associated with the society ==
- Richard Meux Benson, founder
- Spence Burton, Lord Bishop of Nassau and The Bahamas 1942–1961
- Earle H. Maddux
- Edward William Osborne, Bishop of Springfield
- Kenneth Abbott Viall, Suffragan Bishop of Tokyo
- Tom Shaw, former Bishop of Massachusetts
- Philip Waggett
- Oliver Sherman Prescott
- Charles Chapman Grafton
- Frank Griswold, former Bishop Visitor for SSJE

== See also ==
- St Stephen's House, Oxford
- The Cowley Carol Book
