= Joseph Wilson Sutton =

American Episcopalian priest (1881–1958)

The Rev. Joseph Wilson Sutton (June 6, 1881 – October 23, 1958) was a minister of the Episcopal Church in the United States and the author of several books.

Sutton was born on 6 June 1881 to John C. Sutton and Susan Elizabeth Heighe. After spending his early life in Kent County, Maryland, he graduated from Washington College in Chestertown, Maryland with a B.A. in 1900 and an M.A. in 1904.

== Background ==
He was also a graduate of General Theological Seminary in New York City where he obtained a B.Div. in 1905. A candidate for holy orders from Shrewsbury Church in Kennedyville, Maryland, J. Wilson Sutton was ordained deacon on 4 June 1903 and priest on 6 June 1905 by Bishop William Forbes Adams of the Diocese of Easton. His early ministry was spent as rector of St. James Church in Port Deposit, Maryland from 1905 to 1907 and then as curate at St. Paul's Church (informally known as Old St. Paul's) in Baltimore from 1907 to 1910. He served briefly as headmaster of St. Paul's School. In 1910 he moved to New York City to be curate at historic Trinity Church on Wall Street. In 1914 he was a student at Oxford University in England. He returned to New York in 1915 to be vicar of Trinity Chapel and remained in New York for the majority of his career. During this time he was also a lecturer at the New York Training School for Deaconesses and at General Theological Seminary. In 1936 he was elected Bishop of Vermont, a calling he declined in order to remain at Trinity. In 1943 he was elected rector of St. Stephen's Church in New York, where he remained until his retirement in 1956. J. Wilson Sutton died on 23 Oct 1958. J. Wilson Sutton was the author of the books Our Life of Prayer (1938), The Cross, Our Hope (1940), and Peace Through the Cross: Addresses on Our Lord's Words from the Cross (1931). He was one of the three founding members of the American branch of Anglican Society. He also was recipient of the honorary degree of Doctor of Divinity (D.D.) from Washington College in 1921 and an honorary Doctor of Sacred Theology (S.T.D.) from General Theological Seminary in 1953.
