= Marc Nikkel =

Marc R. Nikkel (1950–2000) was an American Episcopal priest, artist, author, teacher, missionary to the Sudan, and advocate for the Dinka ("Jieng") people of South Sudan.

== Biography ==
Marc Nikkel was born to Mennonite parents in Reedley, California; he studied at the California State University School for the Visual Arts (and anthropology) before joining his sister in mission work in Nigeria and then studying at Fuller Theological Seminary before becoming an Anglican.

In 1981, Nikkel began teaching at Bishop Gwynne College in Mundri, Sudan. From 1984 to 1985, he studied at the General Theological Seminary of the Episcopal Church in Chelsea, New York, being ordained to the diaconate by the Bishop of Southwestern Virginia and to the priesthood on his return to the Sudan. He was known as ‘akon’ ('the bull elephant’) due to his height.

Nikkel was kidnapped by the Sudanese Liberation Army in July 1987 along with several other Americans. He was later released in northern Kenya; for the next year he taught at Saint Paul's United Theological College in Limuru, Kenya. He then left Africa to begin doctoral studies at the Centre for the Study of Christianity in the Non-Western World in Edinburgh, Scotland where he collected, translated and analyzed hundreds of Jieng Christian songs.

After completing his doctoral work, Nikkel served as an advisor to several Sudanese Anglican dioceses, working in partnership with the Church Missionary Society of England and the Episcopal Church in the U.S.A. His primary work was in theological education among the Dinka people of the Nile basin in South Sudan.

In Kenya, Marc Nikkel also co-founded Kakuma Refugee Camp with Bishop Nathanael Garang of Bor Diocese, South Sudan. There at Kakuma, Marc Nikkel named the young Dinka survivors "the Lost Boys."

Marc Nikkel was diagnosed with cancer in 1998, and died in California on September 3, 2000.

== Selected bibliography ==
- The Outcast, the Stranger and the Enemy in Dinka Tradition contrasted with Attitudes of Contemporary Dinka Christians (unpublished Master's thesis, General Theological Seminary, 1988)
- Dinka Christianity: The Origins and Development of Christianity among the Dinka of Sudan, with Special Reference to the Songs of Dinka Christians
- Why Haven't You Left? Letters from the Sudan, edited by Grant LeMarquand ISBN 0-89869-472-8
