= Joe Sutton (journalist) =

American journalist (born 1986)

Joseph Sutton (born August 1986) is a journalist and designer. Since 2003 he has been working in the news and entertainment business. Sutton has developed a reputation for his various styles in fashion. He plays a leading role in covering major U.S. and international news events for CNN.

Sutton has shared two Peabody Awards, for CNN's Gulf Oil Spill coverage and CNN's Arab Springs coverage in the Middle East and North Africa.

== Early life ==
Sutton was born in Atlanta, Georgia. His father, also named Joseph Sutton, was a long serving Atlanta Police Officer (now deceased) and his mother, Terry Johnson, works in the medical field. Sutton attended Atlanta Public Schools. He graduated from North Atlanta High School in 2004. It was while in high school he decided to get involved with one of his passions, meteorology. But Sutton always had a dream of television, and that's when he was presented the opportunity to work at CNN in a summer job capacity when he was a high school junior.

He is a graduate of Oglethorpe University with a B.A. in communications and a minor in political science in 2009 with honors. The university has named him one of their Most Notable Alumni.

== Career ==
Sutton got started with his career at 15. He at the time was a volunteer meteorologist at the National Weather Service in Peachtree City, Georgia. Sutton joined CNN/TBS at 16. In his present role, some of Sutton's duties includes handling newsgathering in the United States on the overnights. In 2008, Sutton interned in Beijing with NBC during the Summer Olympic Games. He has also worked for a number of Turner Entertainment networks which include Turner South, GameTap, TBS, TNT and he worked on a project with Court TV's Star Jones show. Sutton briefly interned for U.S. Congressman David Scott in his district offices in Georgia. Sutton frequently appears as a motivational speaker on how to achieve success in corporate America.

Sutton's news coverage has included the death of Muhammad Ali; the Orlando nightclub shooting; the deaths of musician David Bowie and “Fast and Furious” star Paul Walker, and the Ebola scare in the U.S. the death of Michael Brown in Ferguson, Missouri;

Sutton was the first to break the story that Kim Kardashian was held at gunpoint in her Paris hotel where millions of dollars in jewelry was stolen. His tweet of the confirmation before it was deleted for reasons unknown, trended heavily on Twitter and landed Sutton in many publications citing him with the confirmation such as: CNN, The Shade Room, The Guardian, Yahoo, etc.

Sutton has modeled and hosted events for major department stores in Georgia. He is a former member of the Beverly Hills Chamber of Commerce. Sutton's admiration of fashion prompted him to launch a men's line known as Joe Sutton Collection in 2017.

== Personal life ==
Sutton, an only child, splits his time between Atlanta and Los Angeles. He still has a passion for meteorology and at times he enjoys storm chasing. He received his SKYWARN credentials which is a volunteer program that helps to keep communities safe by providing reports of severe weather to the National Weather Service. Sutton is known to be a daily shopper at boutiques and department stores. He credits his frequent shopping to his successes in securing his modeling jobs.

=== Atlanta ===
Sutton is involved with the Atlanta Police Foundation (his father is a retired Atlanta police officer). He produced an acclaimed piece that was showcased at the city of Atlanta's Crime is Toast event that was introduced by the Atlanta Police Chief. He received an honorary award for his work. He also served on the GLAAD Atlanta Leadership Council, where he helped raise awareness for LGBT rights and spearheaded grassroots efforts in Atlanta.
