= Jane Soames =

Jane Soames (1900–1988), also known as Jane Soames Nickerson, was a British-born author, translator, and historian. A graduate of Oxford University, she was employed by The Times as a correspondent in Paris and was an assistant to Hilaire Belloc, author of The Servile State. Soames was married to Hoffman Nickerson (1888–1965), an Assemblyman in the 139th New York State Legislature and grandson of clergyman and real estate investor Eugene Augustus Hoffman. Soames also served as the librarian for the Oyster Bay Historical Society in Oyster Bay, New York.

== Works ==
Title	Role	Publisher	Year of Publication
The Political and Social Doctrine of Fascism (by Benito Mussolini)	Translator	London: Hogarth Press	1933
A Short History of North Africa	Author	New York, NY: Devin-Adair Co.	1961
Homage to Malthus	Author	Port Washington, NY: Kennikat Press	1975
The Old Garden	Author	London: Poets’ and Painters’ Press	1975
Oyster Bay: A Sketch	Editor	Oyster Bay, NY: Oyster Bay Historical Society	1987

== See also ==
- "The Doctrine of Fascism"
