= The Doctrine of Fascism =

1932 essay attributed to Benito Mussolini

- Essay by Benito Mussolini and Giovanni Gentile
- Title page of the second part, published by Gioventù Fascista. Date is given according to the Fascist calendar.
- Original title: La dottrina del fascismo
- Country: Italy
- Language: Italian
- Genre: Political philosophy

Publication
- Published in: Enciclopedia Italiana 14th volume
- Publication date: 1932

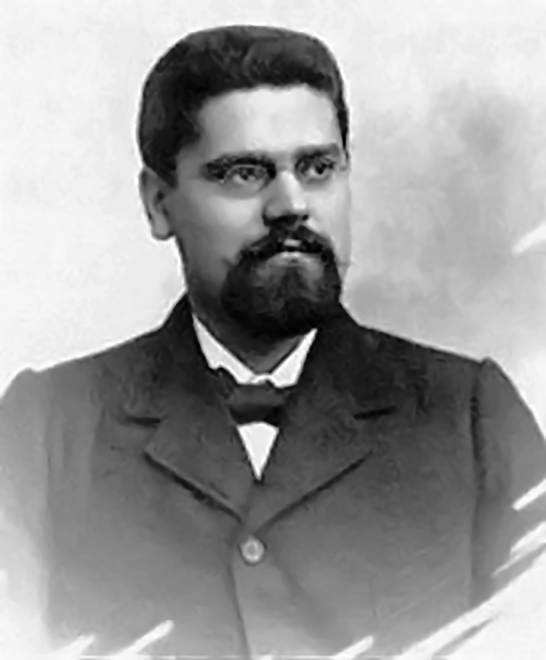
The Italian philosopher Giovanni Gentile wrote the first part of "The Doctrine of Fascism".

"The Doctrine of Fascism" (Italian: "La dottrina del fascismo") is an essay attributed to Benito Mussolini. In truth, the first part of the essay, entitled "Idee Fondamentali" (Italian for 'Fundamental Ideas'), was written by the Italian philosopher Giovanni Gentile, while only the second part "Dottrina politica e sociale" (Italian for 'Political and social doctrine') is the work of Mussolini himself.

== Overview ==
The essay was written in 1927 by Mussolini, with the help of Giovanni Gentile. It was first published in 1932, in the 14th volume of the Italian Encyclopedia (Enciclopedia Italiana), as the first section of a lengthy entry on "Fascismo" (Italian for 'Fascism'). The entire entry on fascism spans pages 847–884 of the Enciclopedia Italiana, and includes numerous photographs and graphic images. The entry starts on page 847 and ends on 851 with the credit line "Benito Mussolini". All subsequent translations of "The Doctrine of Fascism" were derived from this work.

A key concept of the essay was that fascism was a rejection of previous models: "Granted that the nineteenth century was the century of socialism, liberalism, democracy, this does not mean that the twentieth century must also be the century of socialism, liberalism, democracy. Political doctrines pass; nations remain. We are free to believe that this is the century of authority, a century tending to the 'right', a Fascist century. If the nineteenth century was the century of the individual (liberalism implies individualism), we are free to believe that this is the 'collective' century, and therefore the century of the State."

In 1940, Mussolini ordered all remaining copies of the document, which had different editions and translations, to be destroyed "because he changed his mind about certain points".

== Translations ==
The first authorized translation into English was prepared by Jane Soames and published by Leonard and Virginia Woolf in 1933 (The Political and Social Doctrine of Fascism, London: Hogarth Press, 1933). Soames' translation was also published in The Living Age, November 1933, New York City, p. 241, as a chapter entitled "Authorized translation of Mussolini's 'The Political and Social Doctrine of Fascism'" (1933).

Other translations include:

- Nathanael Greene, ed., Fascism: An Anthology, New York: Thomas Y. Crowell, 1968, pp. 41, 43–44.
- Benito Mussolini, My Autobiography: With "The Political and Social Doctrine of Fascism", Mineola, New York: Dover Publications, 2006, p. 236.

== See also ==
- Constitution of Fiume
- Corporatism
- Definitions of fascism
- Fascism and ideology
- "Fascist Manifesto"
- Italian racial laws
- "Manifesto of Race"
- "Manifesto of the Fascist Intellectuals"
- Sansepolcrismo
