= Eugene Augustus Hoffman =

Eugene Augustus Hoffman D.D., LL.D., S.T.D., D.C.L.
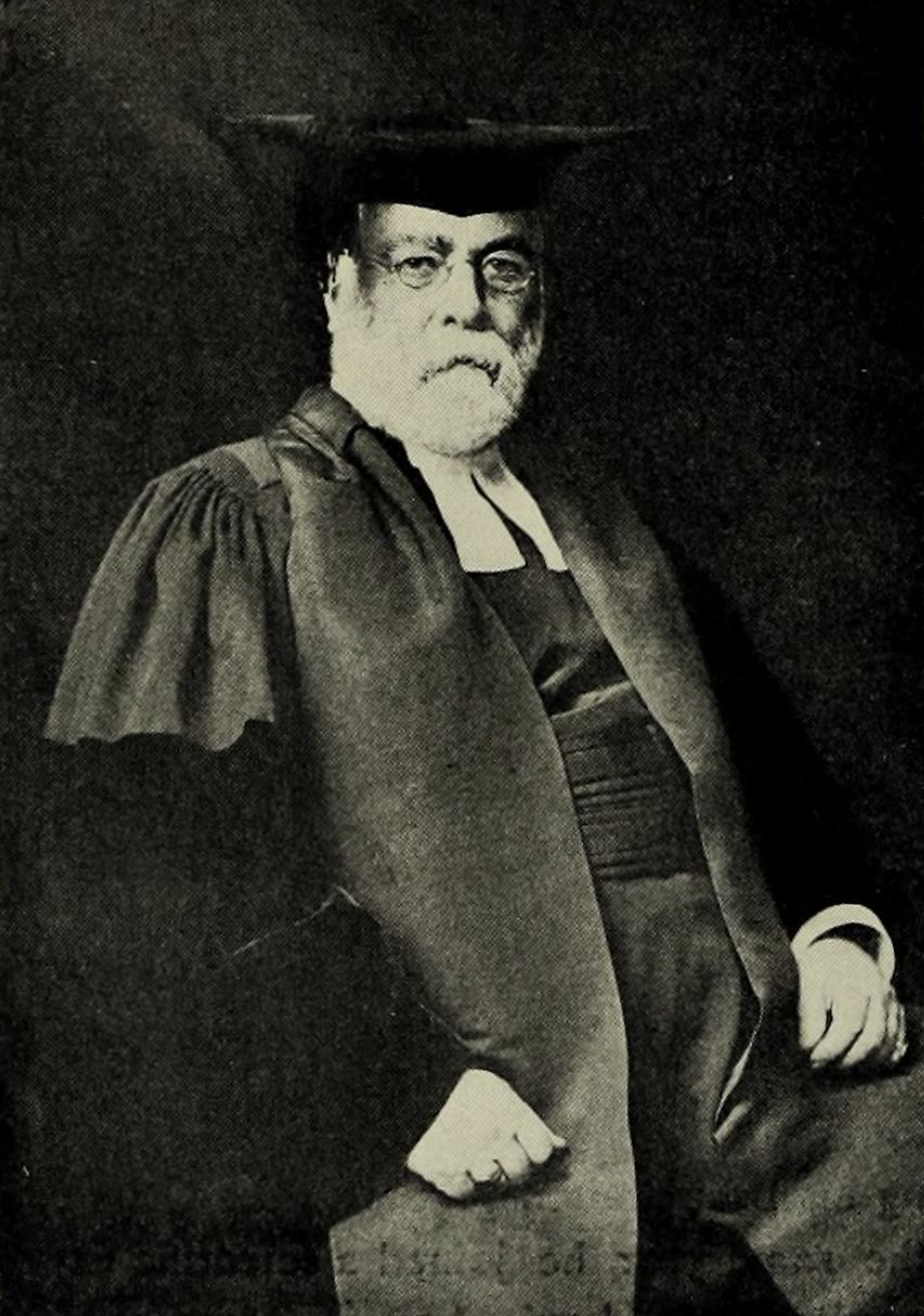
- Church: Christ Church, Elizabeth, New Jersey (1853–1863); St. Mary's Church, Burlington, New Jersey (1863); Grace Church, Brooklyn Heights, New York (1864–1869); St. Mark's Church, Philadelphia, Pennsylvania (1869–1879)

Personal details
- Born: March 21, 1829 New York City, New York
- Died: June 17, 1902 (aged 73) Manhattan, New York
- Denomination: Episcopalian
- Education: Columbia Grammar School; Rutgers College; Harvard College, A.B. (1848); General Theological Seminary

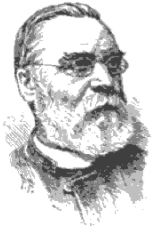
Eugene Augustus Hoffman

Eugene Augustus Hoffman (March 21, 1829 – June 17, 1902) was an American Episcopal clergyman.

== Biography ==
Eugene Augustus Hoffman was born in New York City on March 21, 1829, the son of Samuel Verplanck Hoffman. He was educated at Columbia Grammar School, then Rutgers College and Harvard College where he received his A.B. in 1848. He later studied at the General Theological Seminary and was ordained a deacon of the Episcopal Church in 1851 and Priest in 1853.

He was a man of great wealth, often referred to as “the richest clergyman in America.” At the time of his death in 1902, his real estate holdings in New York City alone were estimated to be worth $10 million. A portion of his real estate holdings remain tied to his descendants and are currently managed by William Hoffman Nickerson, the grandson of Hoffman’s daughter Mary Louise Hoffman Nickerson.

He held rectorships at Christ Church in Elizabeth, New Jersey from 1853–1863; St. Mary's Church in Burlington, New Jersey in 1863; Grace Church in Brooklyn Heights, New York from 1864–1869; and at St. Mark's Church in Philadelphia from 1869–1879. In 1879, he was appointed Dean of the General Theological Seminary in New York.

Hoffman, with other members of his family, heavily endowed the General Theological Seminary. In 1898, he purchased a Gutenberg Bible through London bookseller Bernard Quaritch for $15,000. Considered to be one of the best examples in existence, the Gutenberg Bible was donated in 1899 to the Seminary’s library. In 1978, the Seminary sold the Bible at auction at Christie’s to the Württembergische Landesbibliothek (Württemberg State Library) in Stuttgart, Germany, for $2.2 million, a record price for the time.

He built Christ Church and rectory at Elizabeth, and also churches at Woodbridge and Millburn, New Jersey.

Hoffman received an honorary Master of Arts degree from Harvard University in 1851. He received honorary Doctor of Divinity degrees from Rutgers University in 1864, Racine College in 1882, the General Theological Seminary in 1885, Columbia University in 1886, Trinity College in 1895, and University of Oxford in 1895. He received honorary Doctor of Law degrees from the University of the South in 1891, Trinity College, Toronto in 1893, and Doctor of Civil Law from King's College in 1893. He received a Doctor of Sacred Theology from Columbia in 1887.

He was President of the New York Historical Society, Fellow of the American Museum of Natural History, and a member and on the boards of many academic, charitable, and religious organizations. He donated the Hoffman Collection of Butterflies, which included 4,500 specimens representing 1,500 species from North America, South America, and Asia, to the American Museum of Natural History. He was also a pivotal leader in the construction of the Cathedral of St. John the Divine in New York City, serving as Chairman of the Building Committee and a member of the Board of Trustees. His name is engraved on one of the eight great granite columns inside the cathedral; these columns measure 54 feet tall and 6 feet wide and are among the largest stone columns in the world.

Eugene Augustus Hoffman died in Manhattan on June 17, 1902.

Notable descendants include his grandson, historian and New York State Assemblyman Hoffman Nickerson (who married British historian and author Jane Soames); and his great-grandsons Eugene Hoffman Nickerson, a federal judge and Nassau County Executive, and William Hoffman Nickerson, a member of the Connecticut State Legislature.

== Works ==
His writings include Free Churches (1858) and The Eucharistic Week (1859 and 1893).
