= General Theological Seminary =

Seminary of the Episcopal Church in New York

- Motto: Sermo Tuus Veritas Est
- Motto in English: "Your Word Is Truth"
- Type: Private seminary
- Established: 1817; 209 years ago
- Religious affiliation: Episcopal Church
- President: Ian S. Markham
- Faculty: 6 full-time faculty, various adjunct professors
- Students: 50
- Location: New York City, New York, U.S. 40°44′44″N 74°00′14″W
- Campus: Urban, 5.5 acres (2.2 ha)
- Colors: Blue and white
- Nickname: Penguins
- Website: www.gts.edu

The General Theological Seminary of the Episcopal Church (GTS) is an Episcopal seminary in New York City. Founded in 1817, GTS is the oldest seminary of the Episcopal Church and the longest continuously operating seminary in the Anglican Communion. The seminary was chartered by an act of the Episcopal Church's General Convention and its name was chosen to reflect its founders' vision that it be a seminary to serve the whole Church. In 2022, the General Theological Seminary entered into a formal affiliation with Virginia Theological Seminary whereby the two separate institutions share a common leadership structure.

== History ==
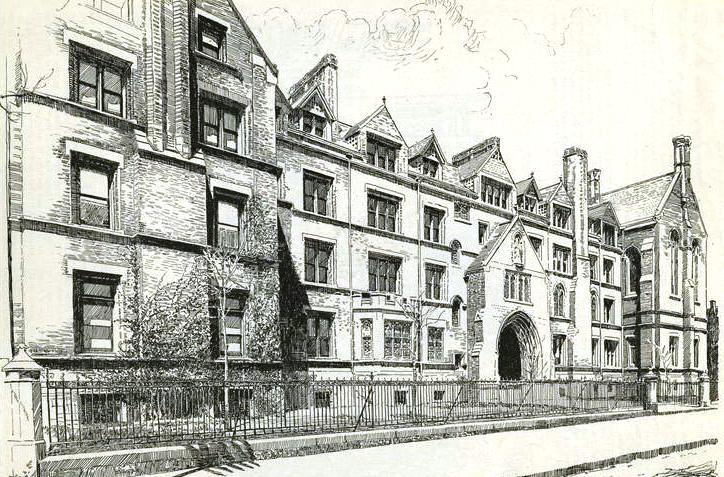
The 9th Avenue entrance to the seminary in 1890

=== Founding ===
In May 1817 General Convention, the governing body of the Episcopal Church, met in New York City and passed two resolutions: first, to found a general Episcopal seminary to be supported by the whole church; second, that it be located in New York City. This was emended in 1820 to remove the school to New Haven, Connecticut, but in 1821 the will of Trinity Church vestry member Jacob Sherred unexpectedly heeded the words of his friend John Pintard and directed that his entire fortune of around $60,000 should be paid when:

... there shall be established within the state of New-York, under the direction or by the authority of the General Convention of the Protestant Episcopal Church in the United States of America, or of the Convention of the Protestant Episcopal Church in the State of New-York, a College, Academy, School, or Seminary, for the education of young men designed for holy orders in the Protestant Episcopal Church.

The newly established diocesan school in New York expected to be the beneficiary and Bishop Hobart published his thanks for the gift in the April 4 New York Evening Post, since the General Seminary had already begun its 1820 term in Connecticut. A special convocation of the bishops was hastily arranged, however, and it was agreed to return the school to New York City in order to claim Sherred's grant, although the Virginia deputies continued to bemoan that the seminary should be "placed under more favorable auspices for the promotion of what we [believe] to be sound views of the Gospel and the Church than it would be in New York". Duncan Cameron mollified them and convinced one to note that "the evil of the undue influence of New York in the General Seminary ... would be chiefly at the beginning, and would be decreasing every year". With some stipulations concerning its governance, Bishop Hobart consented to the union of the diocesan school with the General Seminary rather than contesting the inheritance. The unified school opened for the spring term of 1822.

Other parishioners of Trinity Church went on to support the once more local institution. Clement Clarke Moore, famous for penning A Visit from St. Nicholas, owned the estate "Chelsea", which included most of what would become the Manhattan neighborhood by that name. Also a member of Trinity Church, he donated 66 tracts of land—which was his apple orchard—to become the site of the new seminary. It was not, however, until 1827 that the seminary occupied that land.

Other figures influential in the founding of the seminary include Theodore Dehon, William White, and John Henry Hobart. Bishop Hobart served as the seminary's first dean, after which the Bishop of New York served in this capacity until the 1850s.

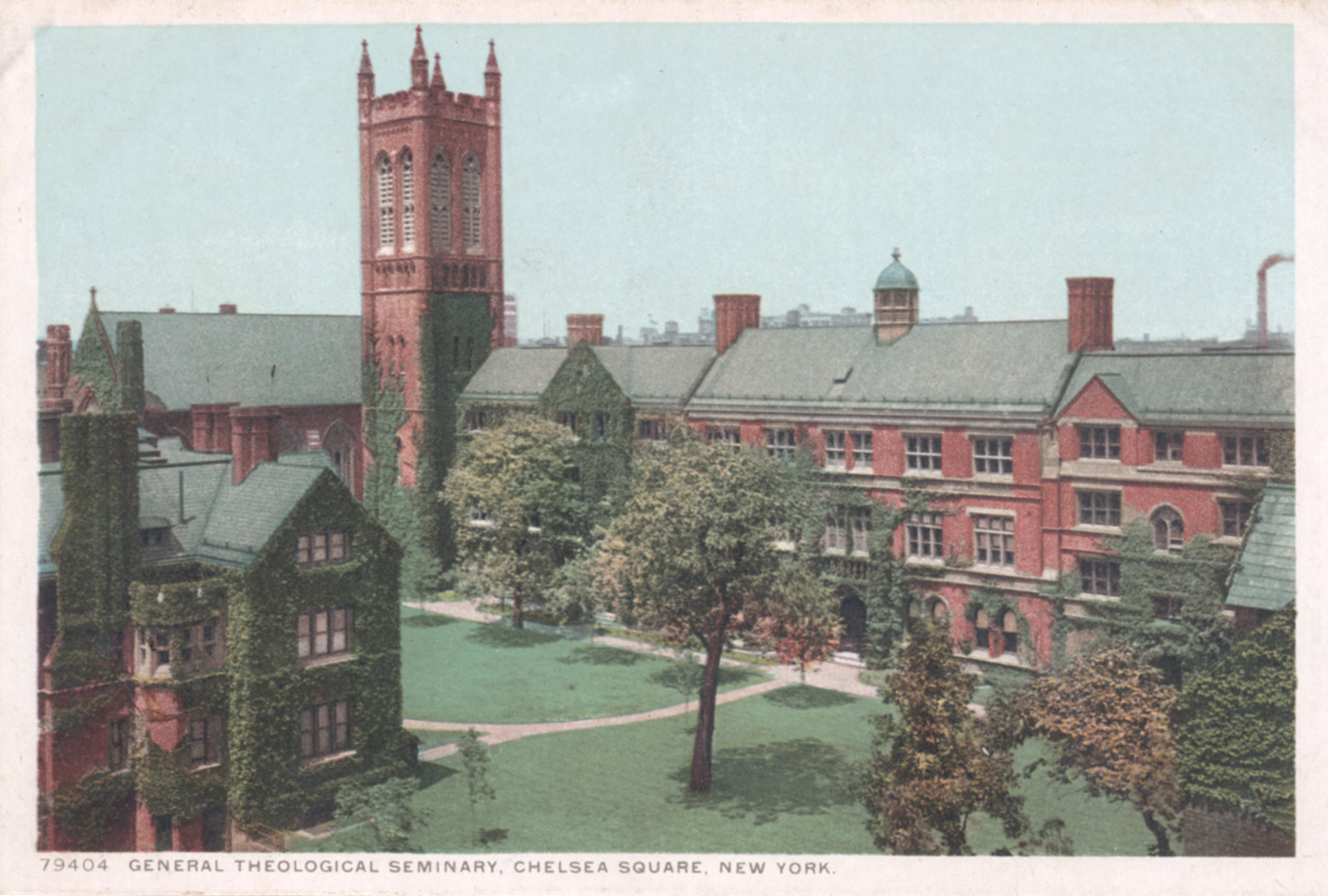
Eastern quad of Hoffman's Grand Design at The General Theological Seminary

=== 19th century ===
In 1878, Eugene Augustus Hoffman – said to be the richest clergyman in the world due to his extensive real estate holdings – was appointed dean. Under his tenure, the seminary saw tremendous growth, both in student body and facilities. Dean Hoffman's "grand design" was for the seminary's Chelsea campus to be built on an Oxford model, with neo-Gothic buildings facing onto a central quadrangle or Close. Likely Dean Hoffman's most influential addition to the seminary's campus was the Chapel of the Good Shepherd which was begun in 1886, completed two years later, and became known as the "Jewel of Chelsea Square." Its set of 15 tubular bells is the oldest extant in this country, with tubes by John Harrington of Coventry, England; original installation (1888) by Walter Durfee of Providence, Rhode Island; and a modern baton clavier (1983) by Royal Eijsbouts of Asten, Netherlands. The tower chime is played daily by members of the seminary's Guild of Chimers to call the community to worship. Architect Charles C. Haight designed and supervised construction of most of the buildings on Chelsea Square while Haight's father, Benjamin I. Haight, was the first priest at nearby St. Peter's Episcopal Church.

=== 20th century ===
Due to growing housing needs for married students, GTS acquired 422 West 20th Street, a residential building opposite the seminary's 20th Street gate in March 1957.

=== 21st century ===
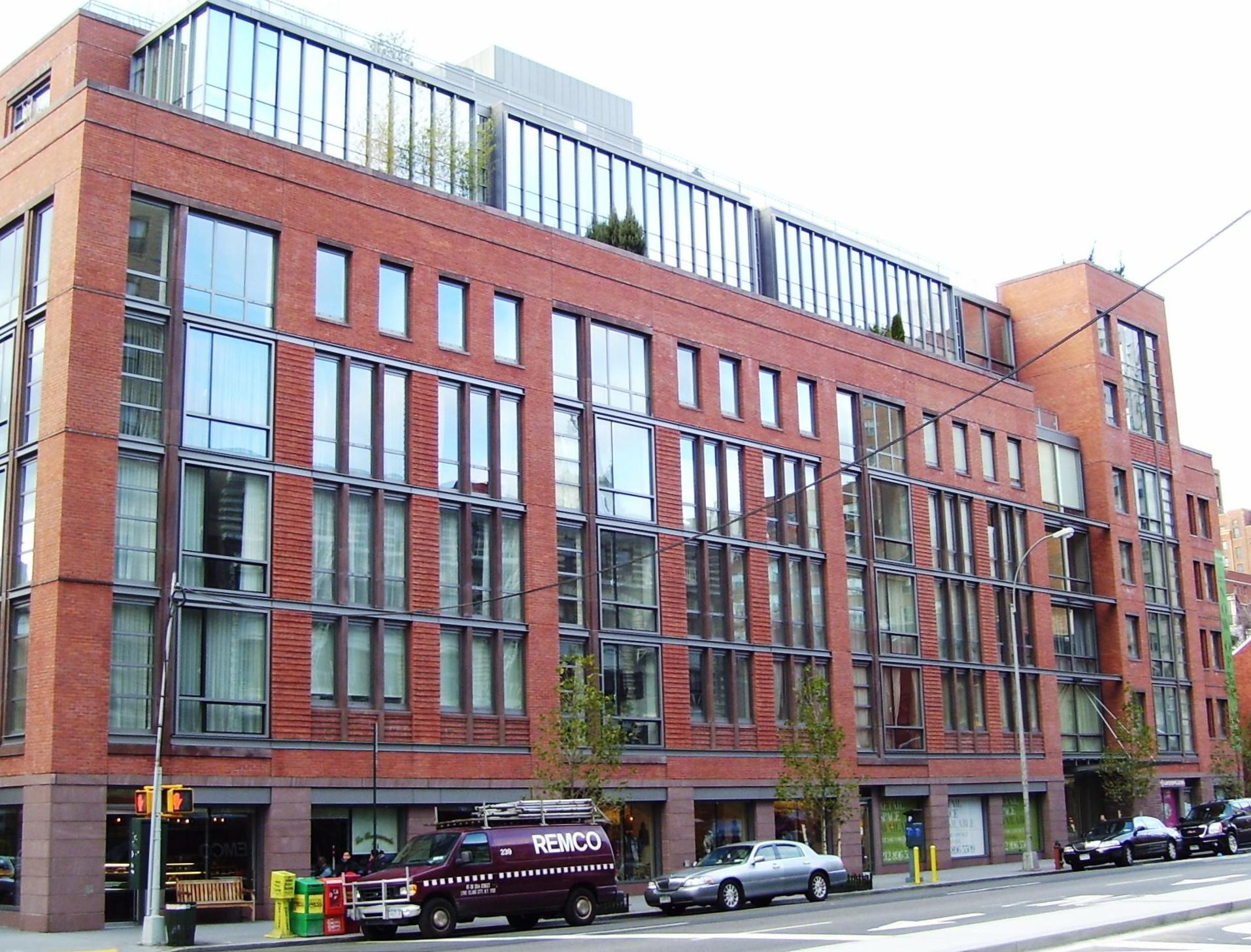
Chelsea Enclave, a residential condominium which replaced Sherrill Hall

A renovation and expansion of the seminary's buildings facing 10th Avenue was completed in 2007, when the Desmond Tutu Center opened. Named for Desmond Tutu, former visiting professor at GTS and retired archbishop of the Church of the Province of Southern Africa, the Tutu Center operates primarily as a hotel and conference center.

In 2007 the seminary engaged in an effort to reduce its carbon footprint, along with general operating costs, by converting many of its buildings to geothermal heating and cooling.

Also in 2007, the seminary, in need of funds, sold Sherrill Hall, a 1960s building along 9th Ave, to the Brodsky Organization for the construction of a residential condominium building. The Chelsea Enclave was completed in 2010 and contains 53 residential units as well as retail space, an underground parking garage, and the seminary's new Keller Library. The seminary's main entrance is now located on 21st Street between 9th and 10th Avenues.

Still facing financial difficulties, General Theological Seminary engaged in its Plan to Choose Life, a strategic initiative which necessitates the sale of several properties: 422 West 20th Street, the Chelsea 2,3,4 building, and the West Building. Assets from the sales were expected to eliminate the seminary's debt, rebuild its depleted endowment, and restore it to financial solvency.

==== 2014 unionization ====
In September 2014, eight of the seminary's ten full-time faculty announced their intention to unionize and their intention to absent themselves from teaching and worship, alleging harassment and bullying behavior from Dean Kurt Dunkle. In a letter to the Board of Trustees on September 17, the eight faculty alleged that Dunkle had repeatedly made racist, sexist, and homophobic remarks; made unprofessional comments about faculty members: compromised the confidentiality of student records; and responded to staff who complained of his behavior by threatening their jobs.

The protesting faculty warned that unless the Board agreed to meet to discuss the allegations, the eight would be obliged to absent themselves from teaching, meetings, and worship. In response, the Board of Trustees of the seminary treated the letter as a mass resignation, which it accepted on September 29. The faculty contested this characterization, noting that no resignations were tendered, and published the details of their grievances online, including the original September 17 letter.

Citing the controversy roiling the seminary, a previously arranged series of lectures by Stanley Hauerwas were canceled when he declined to attend. Around the same time an online petition was established supporting the faculty, with hundreds of co-signers including theologians from all over the country who pledged not to speak at GTS until the terminated faculty were reinstated.

==== 2020s ====
During the COVID-19 pandemic, like most other institutions of higher learning, GTS pivoted to virtual learning for the first time in its history. In 2021, the Board of Trustees authorized the seminary to launch a fully hybrid MDiv program, which welcomed its first cohort of students in 2022, and in 2023 replaced the residential program entirely.

At the same time, under the leadership of Acting Dean and President Michael W. DeLashmutt, the Seminary Board entered into a formal process, aimed at assessing the Seminary's long-term financial and operational model. In 2022, a formal affiliation agreement was made between General Theological Seminary and Virginia Theological Seminary. While remaining separate institutions, the two seminaries now share a common leadership structure and support services. Although the affiliation was not characterized as a merger, 32 out of 40 members of the joint GTS/VTS board were from VTS, and the VTS president became the GTS president.

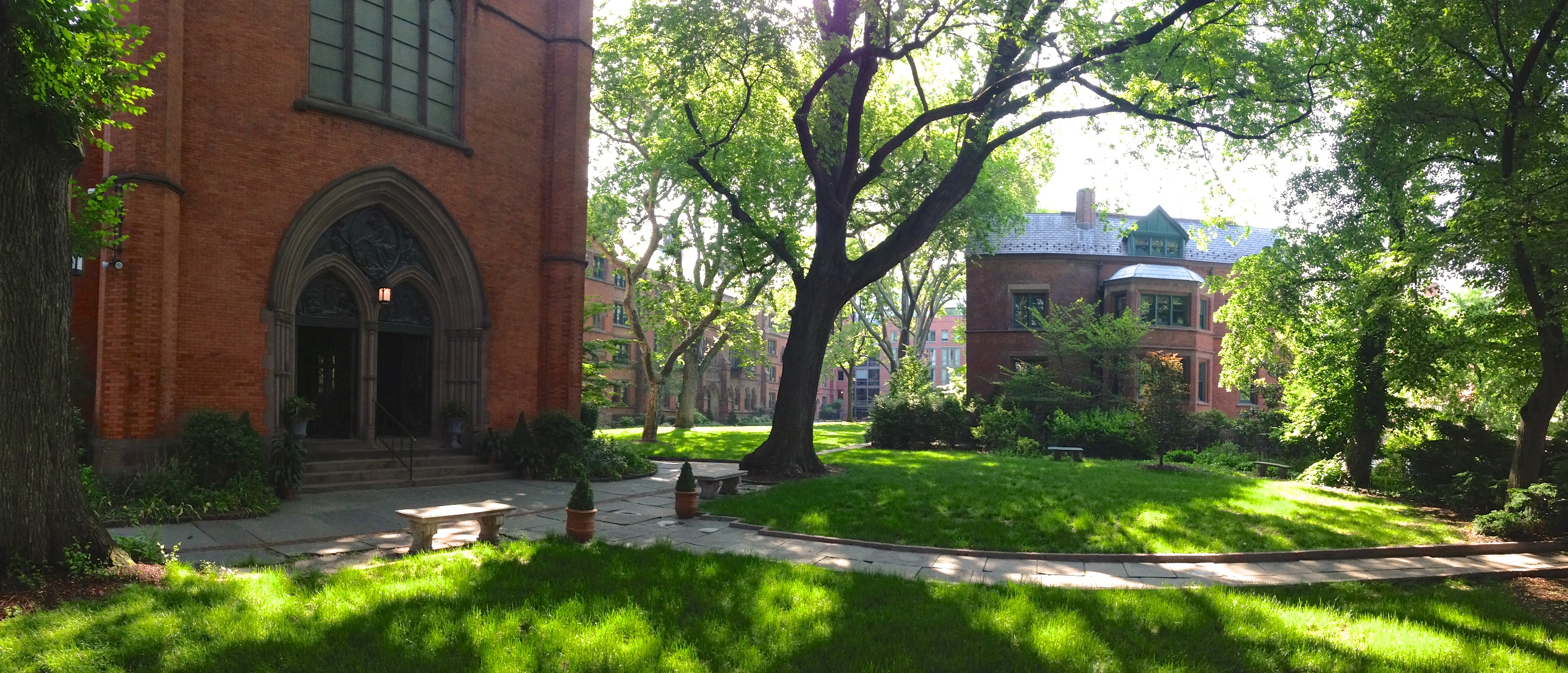
The interior "Close" of The General Theological Seminary in the summer

On September 6, 2024, Vanderbilt University entered into a lease agreement to occupy the seminary campus pending approval from the government authorities. Vanderbilt made it clear that General Theological Seminary would continue to occupy some space on the Chelsea campus, but would remain a separate entity. The lease was finalized in 2025.

GTS had previously sought to lease the campus to a Catholic-affiliated music school, but dropped the plan following opposition from local bishops, who expressed concern about "the lack of full acceptance of the LGBTQ stance of [the music school's] founders."

== Academics ==
The seminary has been accredited by the Association of Theological Schools in the United States and Canada since 1938. As of 2024, GTS offered a hybrid Master of Divinity program, which prepares persons for ordination, primarily in the Episcopal Church.

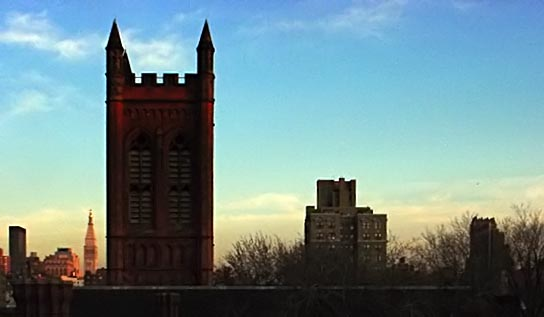
The chapel tower viewed from the Clement Clarke Moore Building

Since 1880, the General Theological Seminary has hosted the annual Paddock Lectures which were founded by benefactor George A. Jarvis and named in honor of Benjamin Henry Paddock who was a member of the Class of 1852 and later Bishop of Massachusetts. The lectures have featured leading theologians including Francis Joseph Hall, Diogenes Allen, William Temple, and Rowan Williams.

== Library ==
The library of the General Theological Seminary has been known as the St. Mark's Library since the 1960s. In 2011, the library moved into a new facility on the east side of the Close, on the site of the former Sherrill Hall. In October 2011, the building was dedicated as the Christoph Keller, Jr. Library, to honor the tenth Bishop of Arkansas.

According to Niels Henry Sonne, "The Library of The General Theological Seminary is a magnificent treasury of books, manuscripts, records and source materials for the study of the life and thought of Christianity." The library's first donation was by John Pintard in 1820 and, within a year, the library had grown to over 2,500 volumes. J. H. Feltus was the first librarian and, in 1834, the Friends of the Library association was formed and their endowment is still productive today. Under the direction of Eugene Augustus Hoffman, who became dean in 1879, the library was classified and catalogued using modern systems and Hobart Hall was built to house the collection. Hoffman also bought the Walter A. Copinger Collection of Latin Bibles and made other significant purchases.

The library had a collection of ancient Bibles and English Bibles. The Ancient Bible Collection included a Hebrew Bible from 1264, in which the comment was so written as to form decorative pictures. It also included three tenth-century Gospels, one decorated with colored miniatures, and a complete Latin Bible from about 1250. In 2024, GTS announced that it would move 6,500 rare books and 13 archival collections from the GTS Keller Library (which is closed for most of the year) to the VTS campus library (which is more convenient for scholars).

GTS owned a Gutenberg Bible from 1898 to 1978, when it sold the book for $2.2 million to the Württembergische Landesbibliothek in Stuttgart, Germany. One of the pages of this copy was found to have been forged and was replaced with another page from another incomplete Gutenberg Bible, making this the first incomplete Gutenberg Bible to be made whole again.

== Campus ==
Located on the west side of Manhattan in New York City, the General Theological Seminary sits in the heart of Chelsea, a largely residential area with a large gay population that is known as a center of the New York art world, with over 200 galleries in the neighborhood. Chelsea Square, the block between 9th and 10th Avenues and 20th and 21st Streets on which the seminary sits, is at the center of the Chelsea Historic District, which is listed on the National Register of Historic Places. The seminary is frequently noted for the beauty of the gardens on its campus, called the Close, an English term used to refer to a private piece of enclosed property and often associated with cathedrals. The seminary's Close is characterized by a row of neo-Gothic buildings along 21st Street and tree-shaded lawns uncharacteristic of its urban setting.

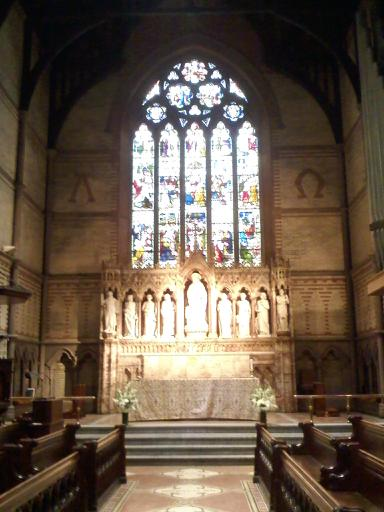
The interior of the Chapel of the Good Shepherd

== Worship ==
Worship is at the center of seminary life and the community gathers several times throughout the day for worship in the centrally located Chapel of the Good Shepherd.

== People ==
Because it has formed many of the church's clergy, GTS has maintained a considerable influence on the life of the church.

Notable former professors include J. Robert Wright the St. Mark's in the Bowery Professor of Ecclesiastical History and David Hurd the Professor of Church Music and Organist of the Chapel of the Good Shepherd.

Notable alumni include:

- James Lloyd Breck, a co-founder of Nashotah House and the founder of Seabury Divinity School
- Jeannette Piccard, one of the "Philadelphia Eleven" who were the first women to be ordained in the Episcopal Church
- Gene Robinson, ninth Bishop of New Hampshire and first openly gay bishop in the Episcopal Church
- Frank T. Griswold, 25th Presiding Bishop of the Episcopal Church from 1998 to 2006.
- Ferguson Glen, a fictitious priest and main character in the novel Thin Blue Smoke, by Doug Worgul.

Many other notable figures, including a number of bishops, have graduated from the seminary.

== In popular culture ==
Because of its proximity to film studios in New York City and its collection of neo-Gothic buildings, GTS has appeared in multiple television shows to portray a number of schools and universities. Only a block from the Chelsea Piers, where Law & Order, Law & Order: Criminal Intent were filmed and where Law & Order: SVU and The Blacklist are currently filmed, the seminary's Close has frequently appeared in those shows as a stand-in for several schools whose campuses are not as accessible and most frequently as the fictitious Hudson University.

== Gallery ==
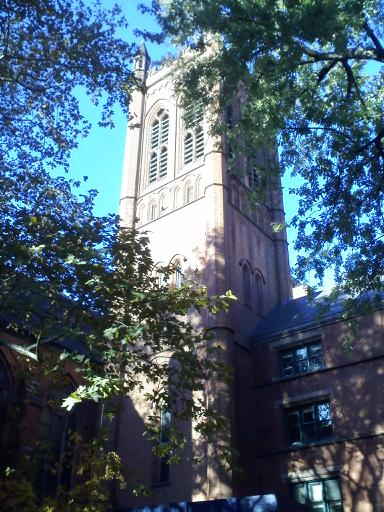
Chapel tower

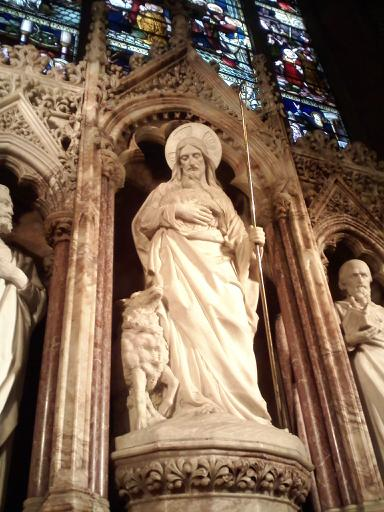
Statue of Christ the Good Shepherd in the chapel

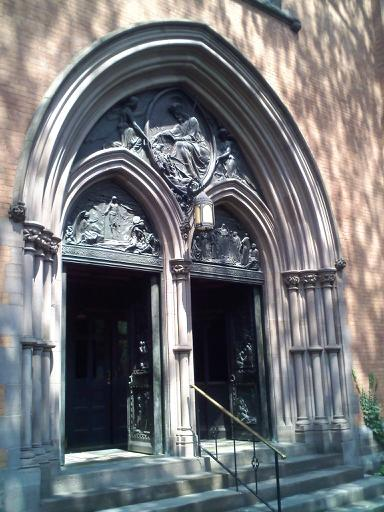
Doors of The Chapel of the Good Shepherd

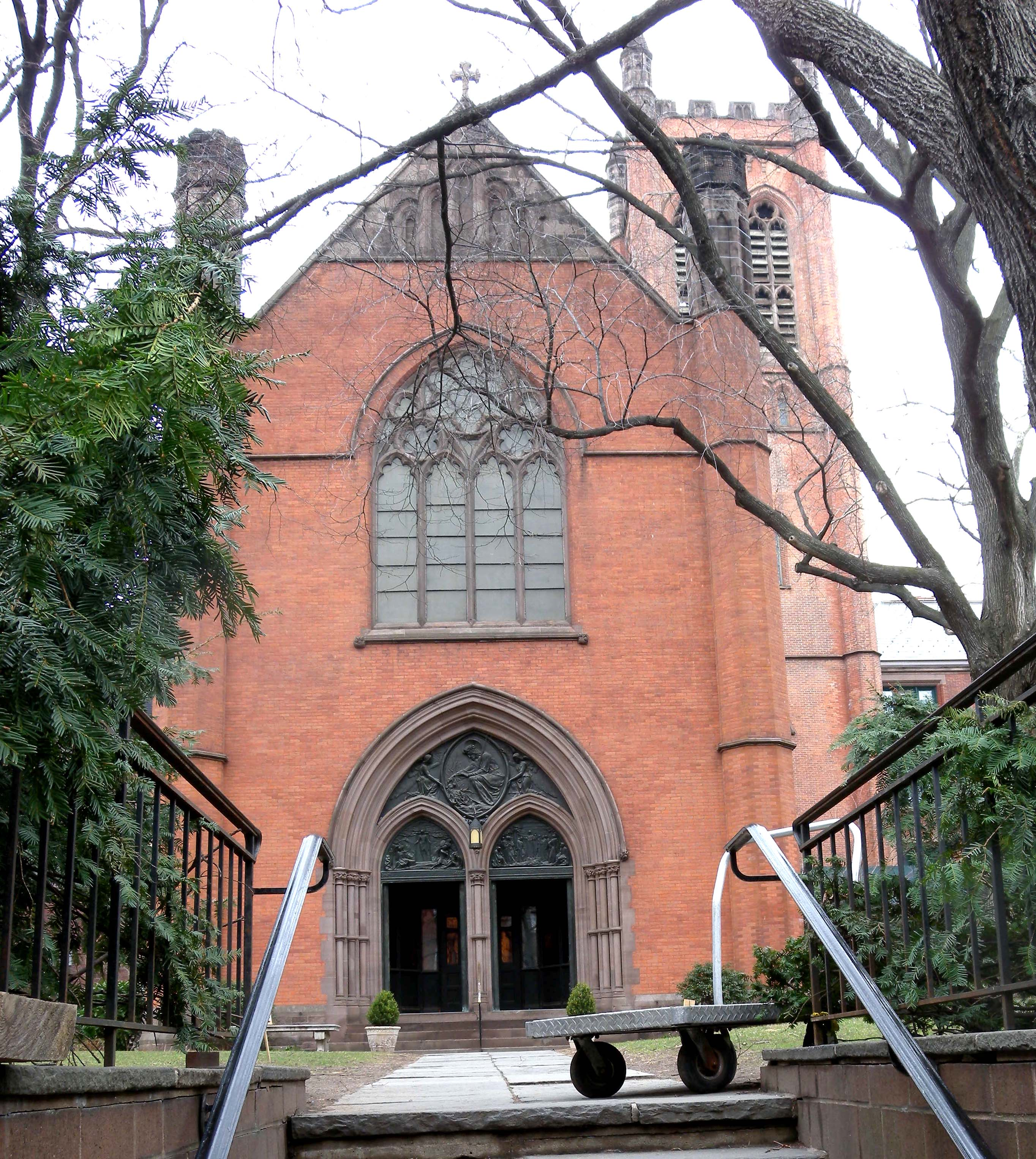
The Chapel of the Good Shepherd from 20th Street

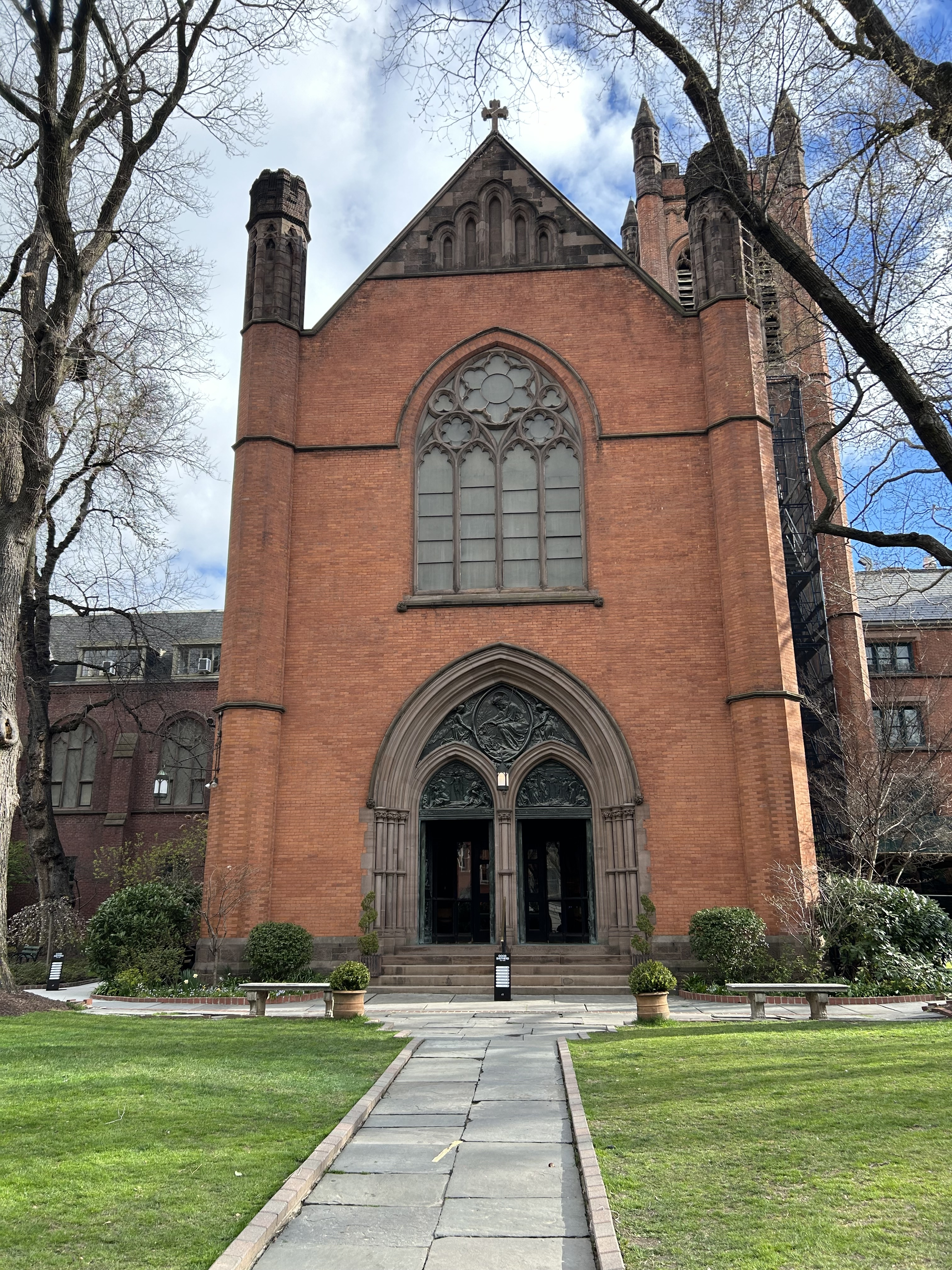
General Theological Seminary Chapel of the Good Shepherd

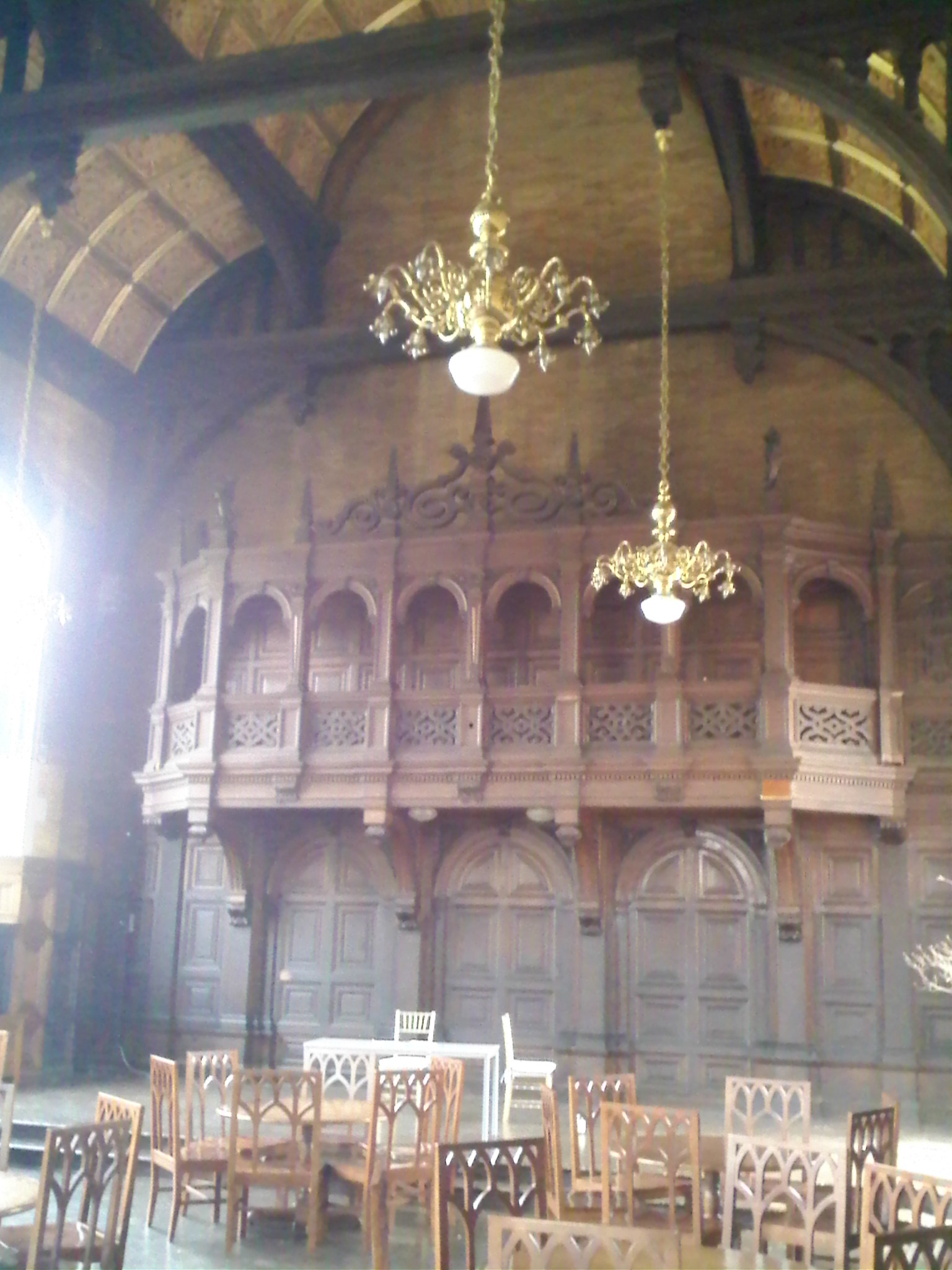
Interior of the Hoffman Refectory

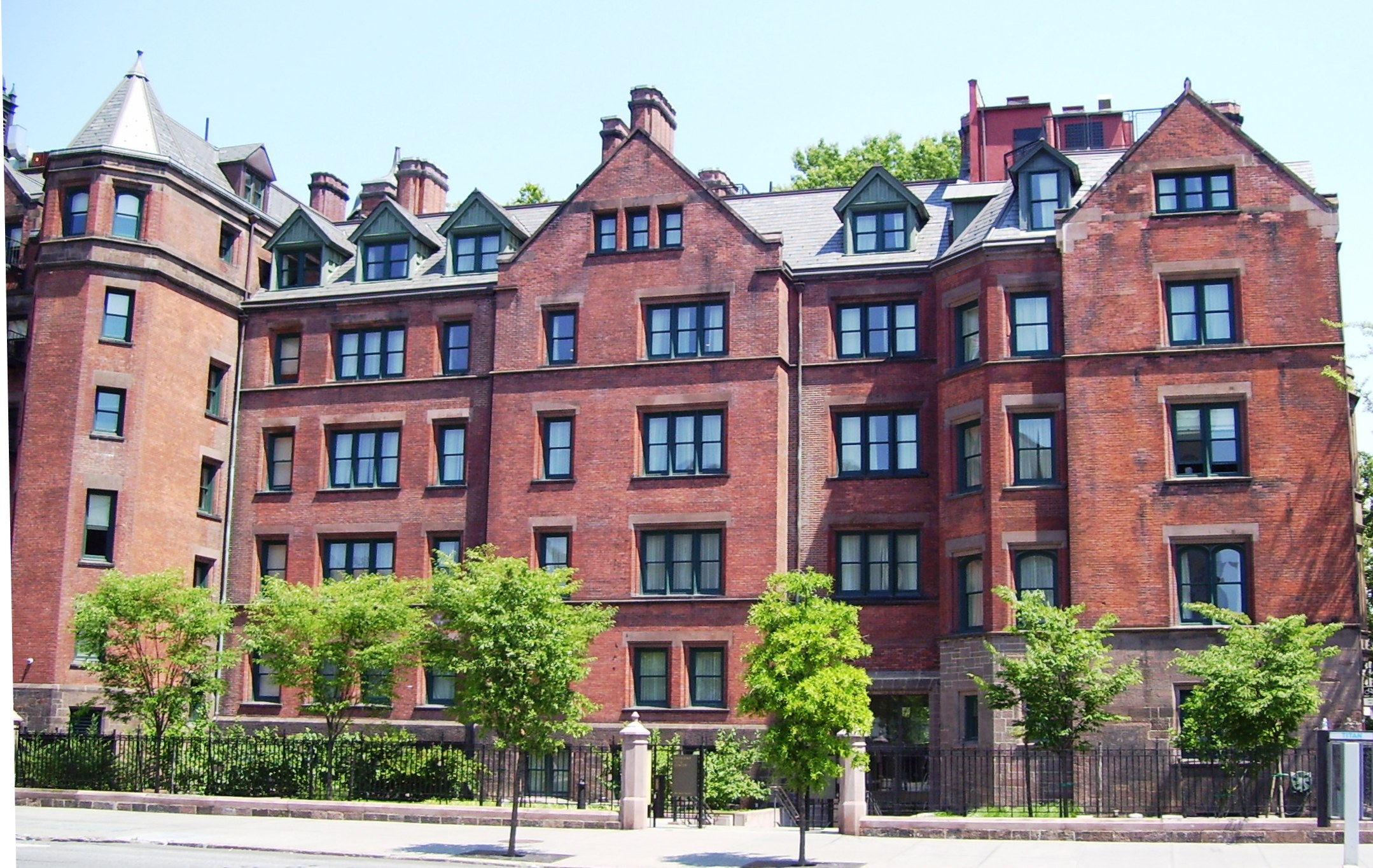
The Desmond Tutu Center on 10th Avenue

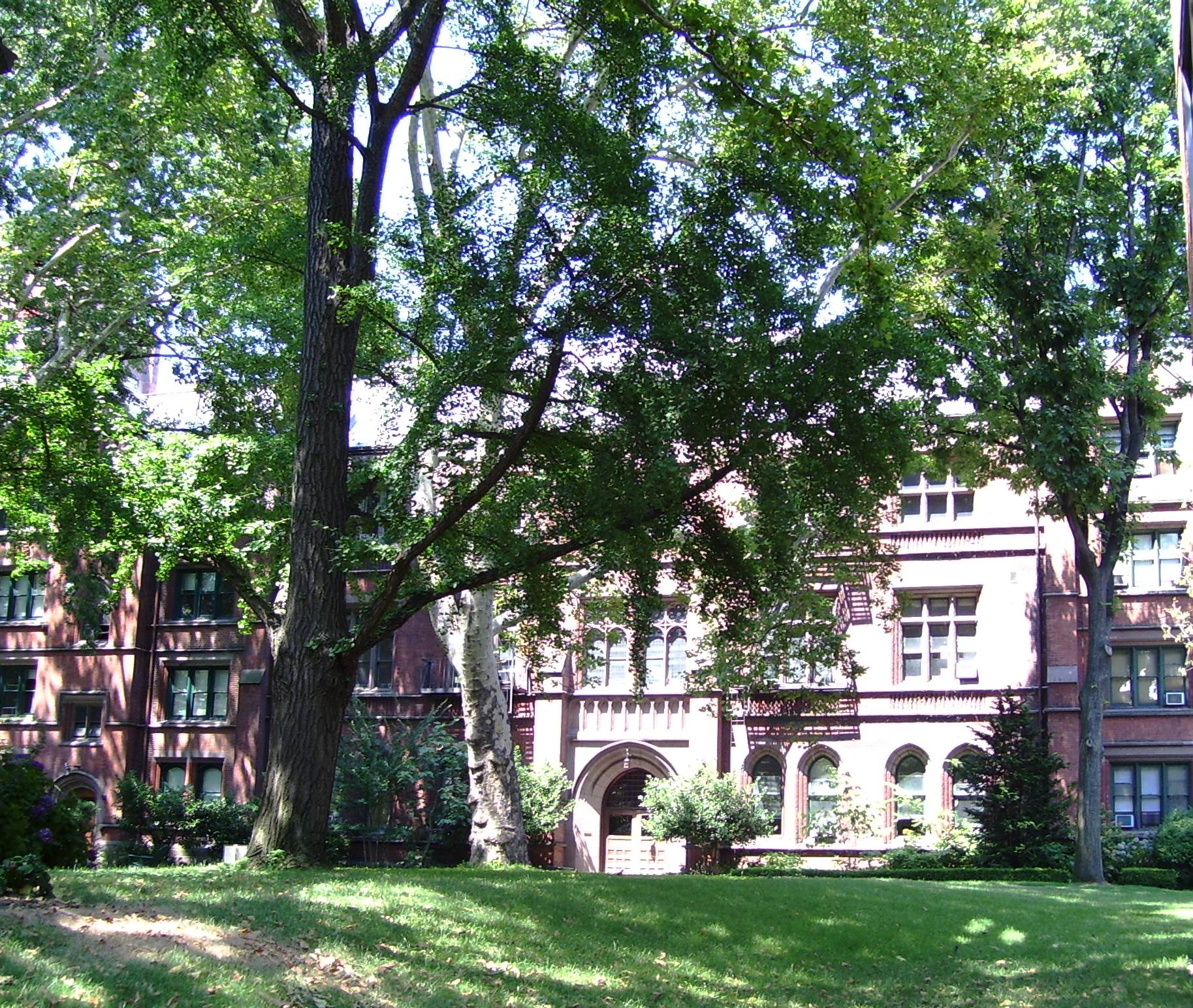
The east end of the Close viewed from 20th Street

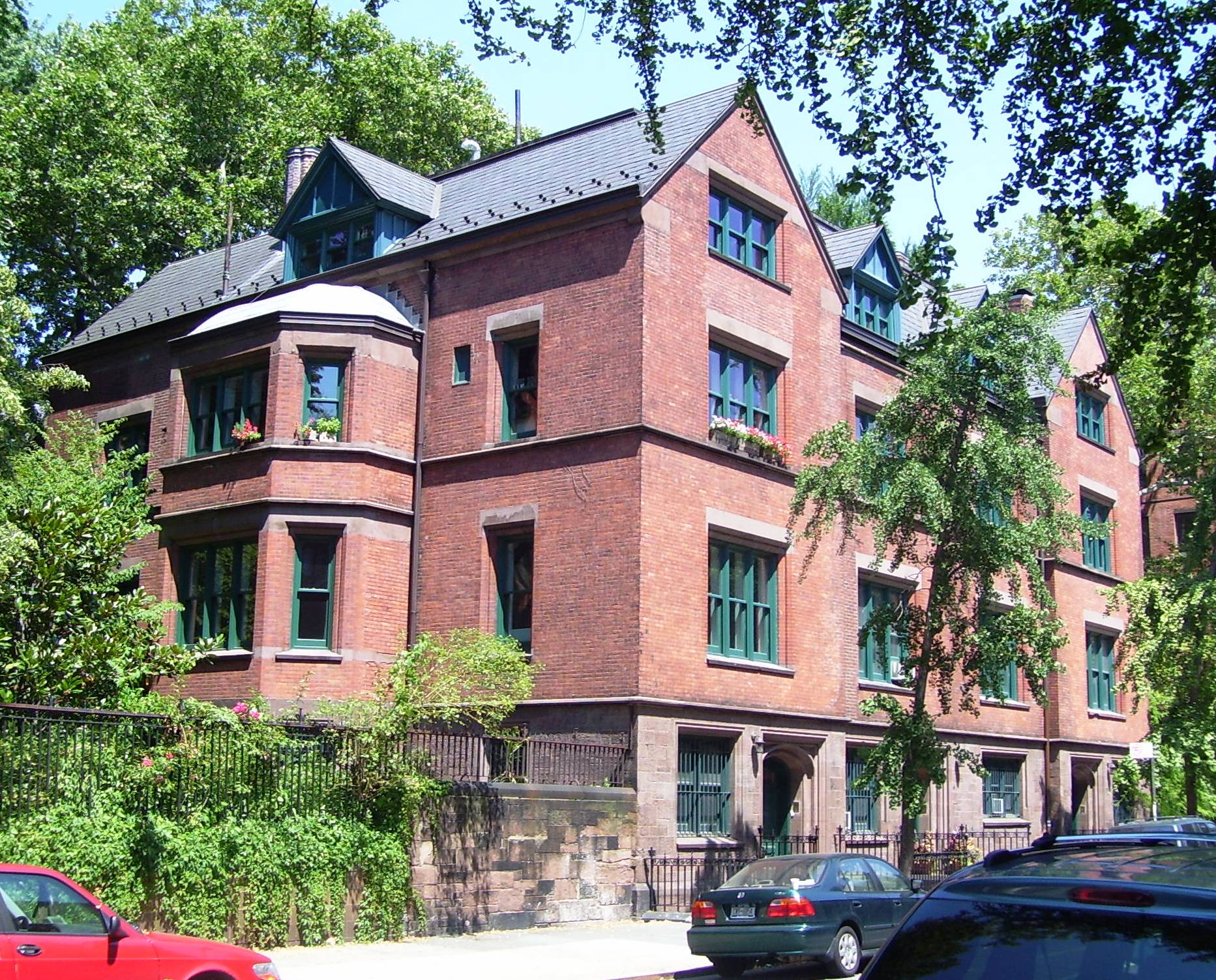
Chelsea 2,3,4 Building sold for development

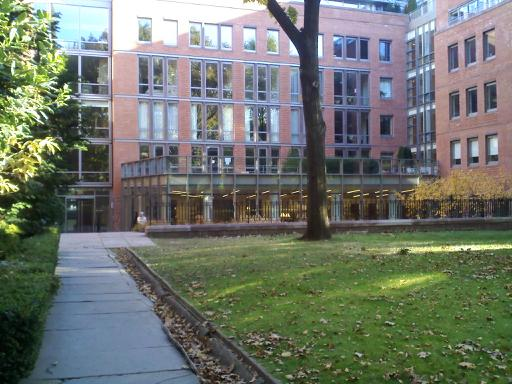
The Keller Library is on the ground floor of the Enclave building
